= Monarchies in Asia =

Countries in Asia which are monarchies

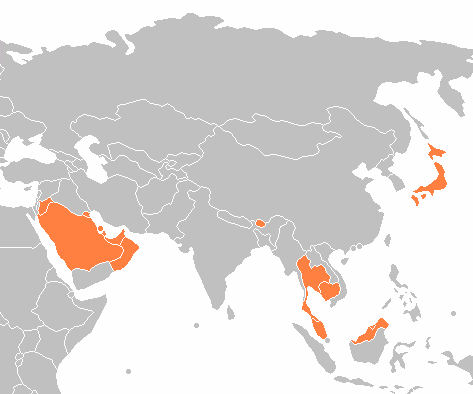
A map of monarchies in Asia (in orange).

There are several monarchies in Asia, while some states function as absolute monarchies where the king has complete authority over the state, others are constitutional monarchies where a monarch exercises authority in accordance with a constitution and is not alone in decision making.

== National monarchies ==
State	Type	Succession	Dynasty	Title	Monarch	Reigning since	First in line
Kingdom of Bahrain	Mixed	Hereditary	Khalifa	King	Hamad bin Isa Al Khalifa	6 Mar 1999 (as emir); 14 Feb 2002 (as king)	Heir apparent: Salman bin Hamad Al Khalifa, Crown Prince of Bahrain (eldest son)
Kingdom of Bhutan	Constitutional	Hereditary	Wangchuck	King	Jigme Khesar Namgyel Wangchuck	9 Dec 2006	Heir apparent: Jigme Namgyel Wangchuck, Crown Prince of Bhutan (eldest son)
Brunei Darussalam	Absolute	Hereditary	Bolkiah	Sultan	Hassanal Bolkiah	4 Oct 1967	Heir apparent: Al-Muhtadee Billah, Crown Prince of Brunei (eldest son)
Kingdom of Cambodia	Constitutional	Elective	Norodom	King	Norodom Sihamoni	14 Oct 2004	None; appointed by the Royal Council of the Throne within the royal family members
Japan	Constitutional	Hereditary	Yamato	Emperor	Naruhito	1 May 2019	heir apparent: Fumihito, Crown Prince of Japan (younger brother)
Hashemite Kingdom of Jordan	Constitutional	Hereditary	Hashemite	King	Abdullah II bin Al Hussein	7 Feb 1999	Heir apparent: Hussein, Crown Prince of Jordan (eldest son)
State of Kuwait	Mixed	Hereditary	Sabah	Emir	Mishal Al-Ahmad Al-Jaber Al-Sabah	16 Dec 2023	Heir presumptive: To be appointed (appointed by the reigning emir within the royal family members)
Malaysia	Constitutional	Elective	Temenggong	Yang di-Pertuan Agong	Ibrahim Ismail	31 January 2024	None; appointed by the Conference of Rulers every five years or after the king's death, abdication etc.
Sultanate of Oman	Absolute	Hereditary	Al Said	Sultan	Haitham bin Tariq	11 January 2020	Heir apparent: Theyazin bin Haitham, Crown Prince of Oman (eldest son)
State of Qatar	Mixed	Hereditary	Al Thani	Emir	Tamim bin Hamad Al Thani	25 June 2013	None; will be appointed by the reigning emir within the royal family members
Kingdom of Saudi Arabia	Absolute	Hereditary	Saud	King	Salman bin Abdul-Aziz Al Saud	23 January 2015	Heir apparent: Mohammed bin Salman, Crown Prince of Saudi Arabia (eldest son)
Kingdom of Thailand	Constitutional	Hereditary	Chakri	King	Vajiralongkorn (Rama X)	13 Oct 2016	Heir presumptive: Dipangkorn Rasmijoti (only legitimate son)
United Arab Emirates	Mixed	Elective	Al Nahyan	President	Mohamed bin Zayed Al Nahyan	14 May 2022	None; appointed by the seven emirs of UAE (normally the Emir of Abu Dhabi is always appointed as president, while the Emir of Dubai is always appointed as Prime Minister

== Constituent monarchies ==
=== United Arab Emirates (UAE) ===
The United Arab Emirates is a federal presidential semi-constitutional monarchy consisting of 7 emirates, each ruled by absolute monarchs. The President, Vice President and Prime Minister are elected by the Federal Supreme Council, which consists of the rulers of the seven emirates. However, in practice, the office of President is traditionally held by the Ruler of Abu Dhabi, while the offices of Vice President and Prime Minister are held by the Ruler of Dubai. The seven emirates of the UAE are:

- Emirate of Abu Dhabi
- Emirate of Ajman
- Emirate of Dubai
- Emirate of Fujairah
- Emirate of Ras al-Khaimah
- Emirate of Sharjah
- Emirate of Umm al-Quwain

==== Gallery ====
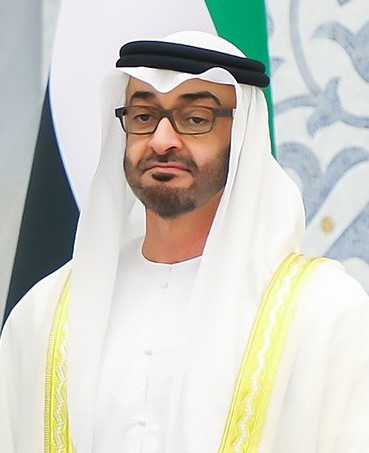
Sheikh Mohamed bin Zayed, President of the UAE and Ruler of Abu Dhabi

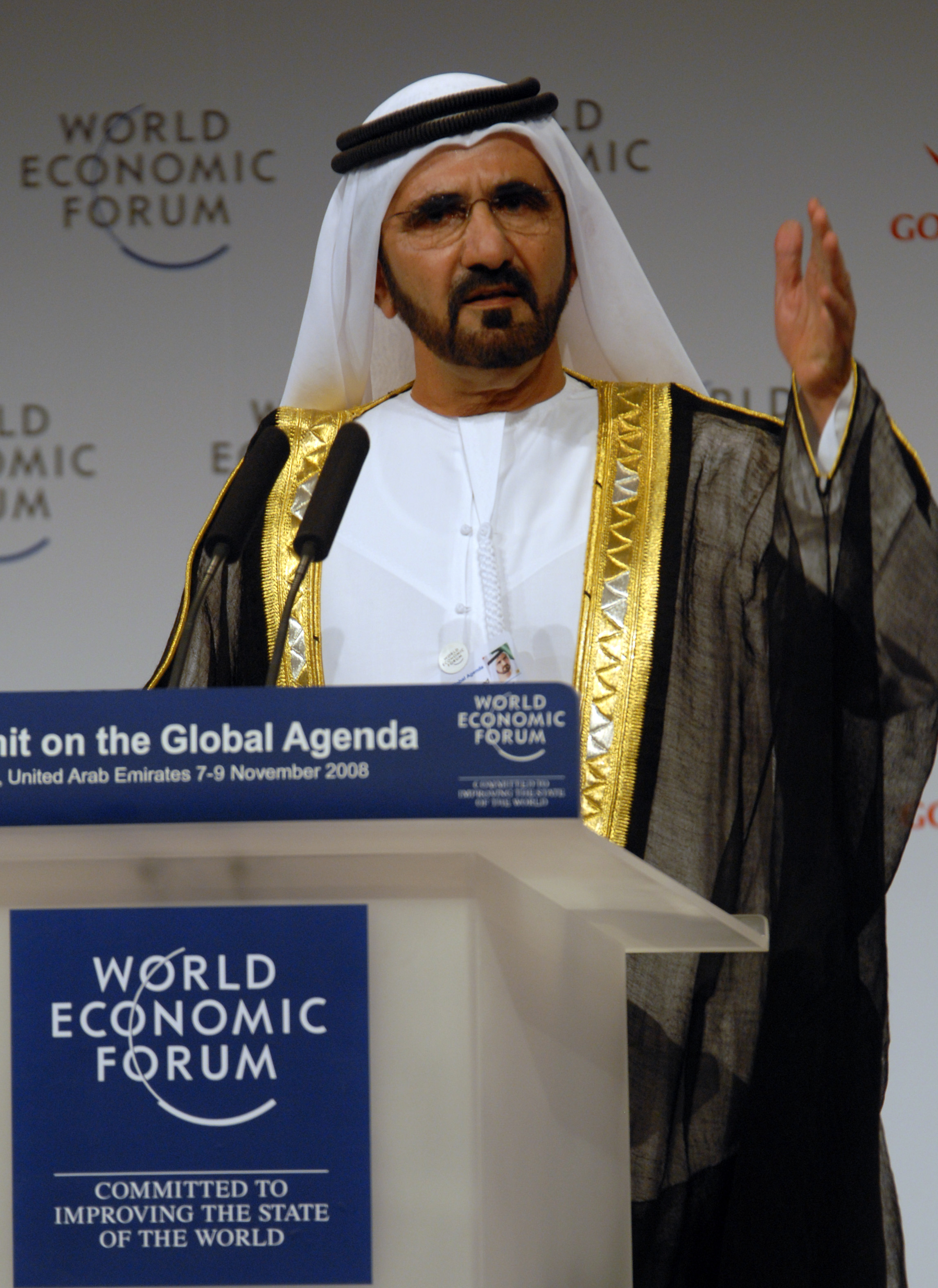
Sheikh Mohammed bin Rashid, Vice President and Prime Minister of the UAE and Ruler of Dubai

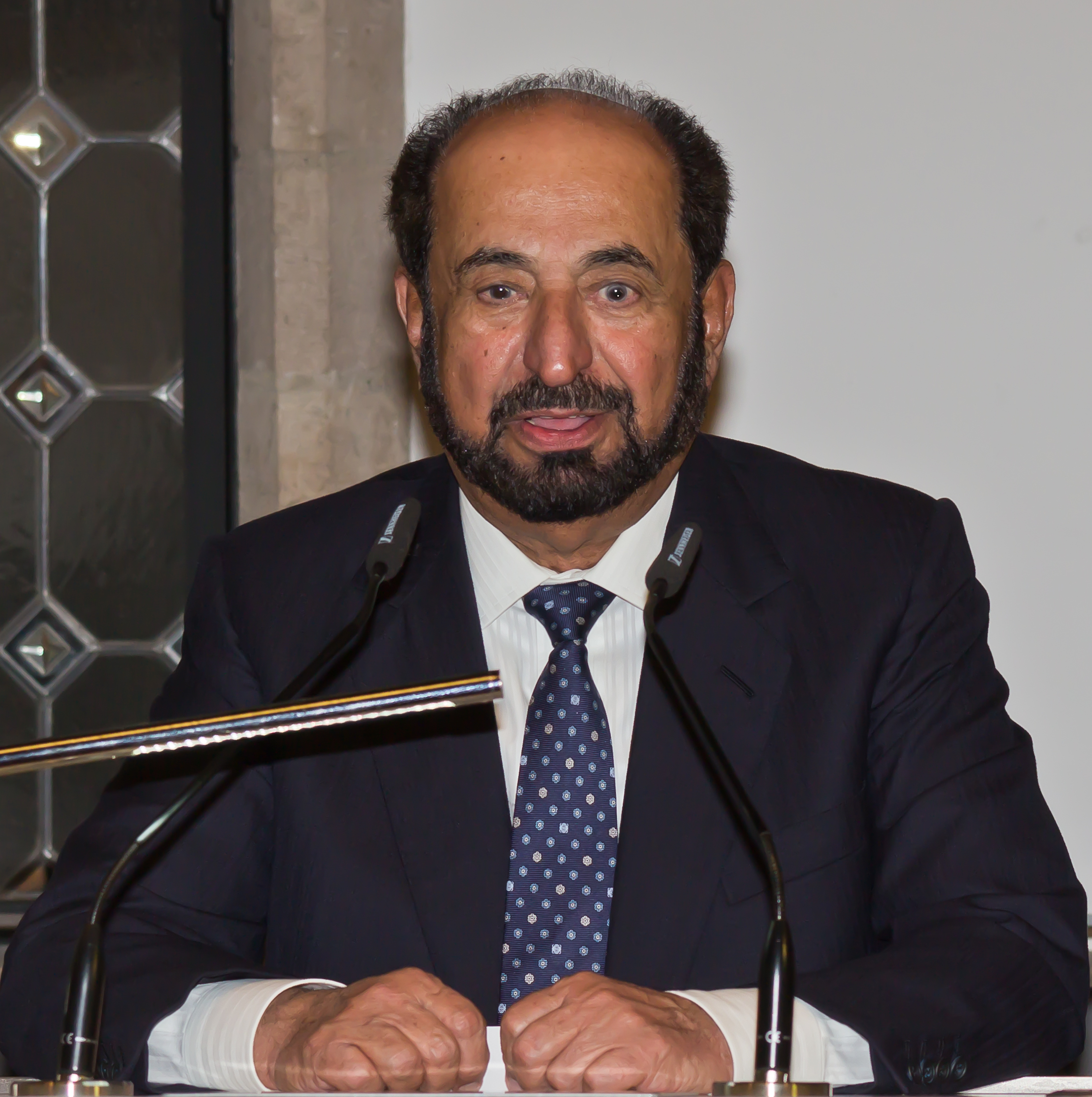
Sheikh Sultan bin Muhammad, Ruler of Sharjah

=== Malaysia ===
Malaysia is a federal constitutional monarchy consisting of 13 states and 3 federal territories. Among the 13 states, 9 are ruled by Malay rulers, who collectively form the Conference of Rulers to elect the Yang di-Pertuan Agong (King) and Deputy Yang di-Pertuan Agong (Deputy King) for a five-year term via secret ballot. The position has to date, been de facto rotated through the state rulers, originally based on seniority. The nine Malay States are the;

- State of Negeri Sembilan
- State of Perlis
- State of Selangor
- State of Terengganu
- State of Kedah
- State of Kelantan
- State of Pahang
- State of Johor
- State of Perak

Remark: The monarchy of Negeri Sembilan is itself elective.

==== Gallery ====
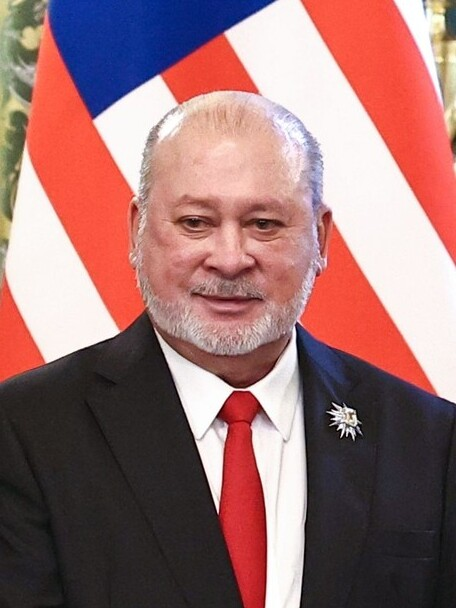
Sultan Ibrahim, King of Malaysia and Sultan of Johor

Sultan Nazrin, Deputy King of Malaysia and Sultan of Perak

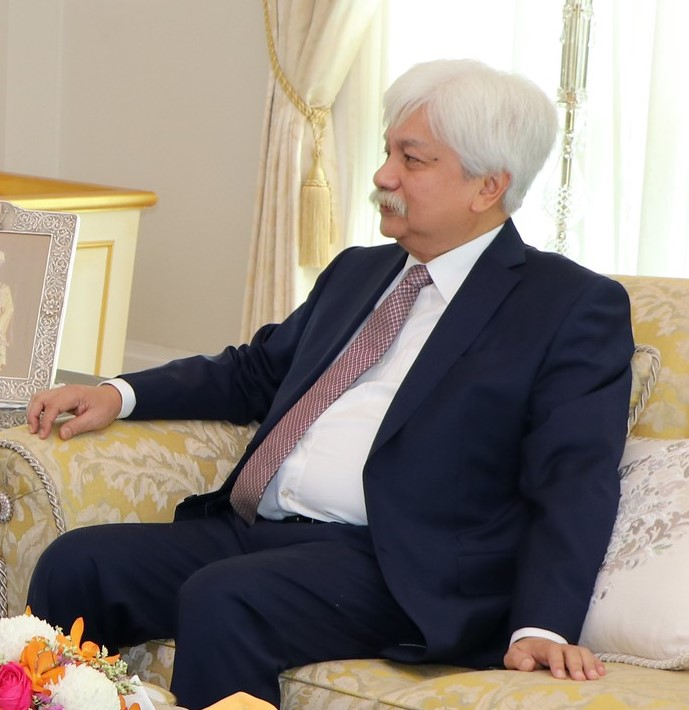
Tuanku Muhriz, Yang di-Pertuan Besar of Negeri Sembilan

== Other subnational ==
=== India and Pakistan ===
The British ruled Indian Empire became independent from British rule in 1947 and became the Dominion of India and the Dominion of Pakistan and in 1950 India became the Republic of India, in 1956 Pakistan became the Islamic Republic of Pakistan, and in 1971 the province of East Pakistan separated from Pakistan to become Bangladesh. Princely states were only in the present-day countries of India and Pakistan, and not Bangladesh. The princely states who were vassal states of the British, had a certain degree of power and autonomy during the British Raj. The princely states had integrated into the newly independent India and Pakistan between 1947 and 1975 (the majority of states ascended into India or Pakistan in 1948) and the former monarchs of the princely states who joined before 1971 in India and before 1972 in Pakistan became titular rulers that received a privy purse and initially retained their statuses, privileges, and autonomy. During this time, the former princely states in India were merged into unions, each of which was headed by a former ruling prince with the title of Rajpramukh (ruling chief), equivalent to a state governor.

In 1956, the position of Rajpramukh was abolished and the federations dissolved, the former principalities becoming part of Indian states. The states which acceded to Pakistan retained their status until the promulgation of a new constitution in 1956, when most became part of the province of West Pakistan; a few of the former states retained their autonomy until 1969 when they were fully integrated into Pakistan. The Indian Government formally derecognised the princely families in 1971, followed by the Pakistani Government in 1972, in which their titles, autonomy, and privy purses were taken away. Presently the rulers of the former princely states are pretenders who carry out ceremonial roles.

==== List of Princely States ====
Name	Capital	Salute type	Existed	Location/ Successor state
Ajaigarh State	Ajaygarh (Ajaigarh)	11-gun salute state	1765–1949	India
Akkalkot State	Ak(k)alkot	non-salute state	1708–1948	India
Alipura State		non-salute state	1757–1950	India
Alirajpur State	(Ali)Rajpur	11-gun salute state	1437–1948	India
Alwar State		15-gun salute state	1296–1949	India
Amb (Tanawal)	Darband/ Summer capital: Shergarh	non-salute state	18th century–1969	Pakistan
Ambliara State		non-salute state	1619–1943	India
Athgarh		non-salute state	1178–1949	India
Athmallik State		non-salute state	1874–1948	India
Aundh State	Aundh (District - Satara)	non-salute state	1699–1948	India
Babariawad		non-salute state		India
Baghal State		non-salute state	c.1643–1948	India
Baghat		non-salute state	c.1500–1948	India
Bahawalpur (princely state)	Bahawalpur	17-gun salute state	1802–1955	Pakistan
Balasinor State		9-gun salute state	1758–1948	India
Ballabhgarh		non-salute, annexed by the British Raj	1710–1867	India
Bamra		non-salute state	1545–1948	India
Banganapalle State		9-gun salute state	1665–1948	India
Bansda State		9-gun salute state	1781–1948	India
Banswara State		15-gun salute state	1527–1949	India
Bantva Manavadar		non-salute state	1733–1947	India
Baoni State		11-gun salute state	1784–1948	India
Baraundha		9-gun salute state	1549–1950	India
Baria State		9-gun salute state	1524–1948	India
Baroda State	Baroda	21-gun salute state	1721–1949	India
Barwani State	Barwani (Sidhanagar c.1640)	11-gun salute state	836–1948	India
Bashahr		non-salute state	1412–1948	India
Basoda State		non-salute state	1753–1947	India
Bastar state		non-salute state	1324–1948	India
Baudh State		non-salute state	1874–1948	India
Beja State		non-salute state	18th century–1948	India
Benares State		13-gun salute state	18th century–1948	India
Beri State		non-salute state	c.1750–1950	India
Bhaisunda		non-salute state	1812–1948	India
Bhajji State		non-salute state	late 18th century–1948	India
Bharatpur State		17-gun salute state	17th century–1947	India
Bhavnagar State		13-gun salute state	1723–1948	India
Bhopal State	Bhopal	19-gun salute state	1707–1949	India
Bhor State		9-gun salute state	1697–1948	India
Bijawar State		11-gun salute state	1765–1950	India
Bikaner State		17-gun salute state	1465–1947	India
Bonai		non-salute state	12th century–1948	India
Bundi State		17-gun salute state	1342–1949	India
Cambay State		11-gun salute state	1730–1948	India
Nawab of the Carnatic		non-salute, annexed by the British Raj	c.1690–1801	India
Chamba State	Chamba	11-gun salute state	c.550–1948	India
Changbhakar (Chang Bhakar)		non-salute state	c.1790–1948	India
Charkhari State		11-gun salute state	1765–1950	India
Chaube Jagirs		non-salute state	1812–1948	India
Chhatarpur State		11-gun salute state	1785–1950	India
Chhota Udaipur State		9-gun salute state	1743–1948	India
Chhuikhadan State		non-salute state	1750–1948	India
Chitral (princely state)	Chitral	11-gun salute state	1560–1969	Pakistan
Chota Nagpur States		non-salute state	12th century–1948	India
Chuda		non-salute state		India
Cooch Behar State		13-gun salute state	1586–1949	India
Cutch State		17-gun salute state	1147–1948	India
Danta State		9-gun salute state	1061–1948	India
Darkoti		non-salute state	11th century–1948	India
Daspalla State		non-salute state	1498–1948	India
Datarpur		non-salute, annexed by the British Raj	c.1550–1849	India
Datia State		15-gun salute state	1626–1950	India
Dewas State		15-gun salute state	1728–1948	India
Dhami		non-salute state	1815–1948	India
Dhar State	Dhar (Dharanagar 1732 -...., Multhan 1728–1732)	15-gun salute state	1730–1947	India
Dharampur State	Dharampur, formerly Mandvegan	9-gun salute state	1262–1948	India
Dhenkanal State		non-salute state	1529–1948	India
Dholpur State		15-gun salute state	c.700–1949	India
Dhrangadhra State (Kuwa, Halwad(-Dhrangadhra))	Dhrangadhra	13-gun salute state	1742–1948	India
Dhrol State		9-gun salute state	1595–1948	India
Dhurwai State		non-salute state	1690–1950	India
D(h)ir	Dir (or Dhir)	non-salute state	19th century–1969	Pakistan
Dungarpur State		15-gun salute state	1197–1947	India
Faridkot State		11-gun salute state	1803–1947	India
Gangpur State		non-salute state	1821–1948	India
Garhwal Kingdom	Various	11-gun salute state	888–1949	India
Gaurihar State		non-salute state	1807–1950	India
Gondal State		11-gun salute state	1634–1949	India
Guler State		non-salute, annexed by the British Raj	1415–1813	India
Gwalior State	Gwalior/Laskar	21-gun salute state	1761–1948	India
Hasht-Bhaiya		non-salute state	1690–1948	India
Hindol State		non-salute state	1554–1948	India
Hunza (princely state)	Baltit	non-salute state	15th century–1974	Pakistan
Hyderabad State	Haydarabad (or Hyderabad)	21-gun salute state	1803–1948	India
Idar State		15-gun salute state	c.1257–1948	India
Indore State		19-gun salute state	1818–1948	India
Jafarabad State		non-salute state	c.1650–1948	India
Jaipur State	Jaipur (Jayapura)	17-gun salute state	1128–1949	India
Jaisalmer State	Jaisalmir (or Jaisalmer)	15-gun salute state	1156–1947	India
Jaitpur State		non-salute, annexed by the British Raj	1731–1840	India
Jalaun State		non-salute, annexed by the British Raj	1806–1840	India
Jambughoda State		non-salute state	late 14th century–1948	India
Jamkhandi State		non-salute state	1811–1948	India
Jammu and Kashmir (princely state)		21-gun salute state	1846–1952	India
Jando(o)l (Jandul)	Barwa	non-salute state	c. 1830–1948	Pakistan
Janjira State		11-gun salute state	1489–1948	India
Jaoli principality		non-salute, annexed by Maratha Empire	17th century	India
Jaora State		13-gun salute state	1808–1948	India
Jashpur State		non-salute state	18th century–1948	India
Jaso State		non-salute state	1732–1948	India
Jasrota		non-salute state		India
Jaswan State		non-salute, annexed by the British Raj	1170–1849	India
Jath State		non-salute state	1686–1948	India
Jawhar State		9-gun salute state	1343–1947	India
Jesar		non-salute state		India
Jhabua State		11-gun salute state	1584–1948	India
Jhalawar State		13-gun salute state	1838–1949	India
Jhansi State		non-salute, annexed by the British Raj	1804–1858	India
Jigni State		non-salute state	1730–1950	India
Jind State		13-gun salute state	1763–1948	India
Jobat State		non-salute state	15th century–1948	India
Jodhpur State (Marwar)	Jodhpur	17-gun salute state	1250–1949	India
Junagadh State	Junagadh	13-gun salute state	1730–1948	India
Kahlur		11-gun salute state	697–1948	India
Kalahandi State		9-gun salute state	1760–1947	India
Kalat	Kalat	19-gun salute state	1666–1955	Pakistan
Kalsia		non-salute state	1006–1949	India
Kamta-Rajaula State		non-salute state	1812–1948	India
Kangra State		non-salute, annexed by the British Raj	11th century–1846	India
Kanker State	Kanker	non-salute state	up to 1947	India
Kapshi		non-salute state	mid 17th century–1956	India
Kapurthala State		13-gun salute state	1772–1947	India
Karauli State		17-gun salute state	1348–1949	India
Kawardha State		non-salute state	1751–1948	India
Keonjhar State		non-salute state	12th century–1948	India
Keonthal		non-salute state	late 18th century–1948	India
Khairagarh State		non-salute state	1833–1948	India
Khairpur (princely state)	Khayrpur (Khairpur)	15-gun salute state	1775–1955	Pakistan
Khandpara State		non-salute state	c.1599–1948	India
Khaniadhana State		non-salute state	1724–1948	India
Kharan (princely state)	Kharan	non-salute state	1697–1955	Pakistan
Kharsawan State		non-salute state	1650–1948	India
Khayrpur (princely state)		non-salute state	1775–1955	Pakistan
Khilchipur State		9-gun salute state	1544–1948	India
Kishangarh State		non-salute state	1611–1948	India
Kochin = Cochi(n)	Kochi (Kochin)	17-gun salute state	12th century–1947	India
Kolhapur State		19-gun salute state	1707–1949	India
Koriya		non-salute state	16th century–1948	India
Kota State		17-gun salute state	17th century–1949	India
Kotharia, Rajasthan		non-salute state	c.1527–20th century	India
Kotharia, Rajkot		non-salute state	c.1733–20th century	India
Kothi State		non-salute state	18th century–1950	India
Kulpahar		non-salute, annexed by the British Raj	1700–1858	India
Kumharsain		non-salute state	15th–1947	India
Kurundvad Junior		non-salute state	1733–1948	India
Kurundvad Senior		non-salute state	1733–1948	India
Kuthar		non-salute state	17th–19th century	India
Kutlehar State		non-salute, annexed by the British Raj	750–1810	India
Lakhtar		non-salute state	1604–1947	India
Las Bela (princely state)	Bela	non-salute state	1742–1955	Pakistan
Lathi State		non-salute state	1340–1948	India
Lawa Thikana		non-salute state	1772–1947	India
Limbda State		non-salute state	1780–1948	India
Limbdi State		9-gun salute state	c.1500–1947	India
Loharu State		9-gun salute state	1806–1947	India
Lunavada State		9-gun salute state	1434–1948	India
Vallavpur		?13 -salute state	1434–1949	India
Maihar State		9-gun salute state	1778–1948	India
Makrai State		non-salute state	1663–1948	India
Makran (princely state)	Turbat	non-salute state	18th century–1955	Pakistan
Malerkotla State		11-gun salute state	1657–1948	India
Malpur State	Malpur	non-salute state	1466–1943	India
Mandi State	Mandi	11-gun salute state	1290–1948	India
Manipur	Imphal (Bishenpur 1775–1796)	11-gun salute state	1110–1949	India
Mayurbhanj State		9-gun salute state	late 17th century–1949	India
Miraj Junior		non-salute state	1820–1948	India
Miraj Senior		non-salute state	1820–1948	India
Mohammadgarh State		non-salute state	1842–1947	India
Mohanpur State	Mohanpur	non-salute state	c.1227–1948	India
Morvi State		11-gun salute state	1698–1948	India
Mudhol State		9-gun salute state	1465–1948	India
Muli State		non-salute state		India
Mundru		non-salute, annexed by the Jaipur State	1621–c.1818	India
Mysore (Mahisur)	Bangalore (to 1831 Mysore [Mahisur]), Srirangapatna	21-gun salute state	1399–1950	India
Nabha State		13-gun salute state	1763–1947	India
Nagar (princely state)	Nagar	non-salute state	14th century–1974	Pakistan
Nagod(h)	Nagodh (Nagod)	9-gun salute state	1344–1950	India
Nandgaon State		non-salute state	1833–1948	India
Narsinghgarh State		11-gun salute state	1681–1948	India
Narsinghpur State		non-salute state	1292–1948	India
Nasvadi		non-salute state		India
Nawanagar State	Jamnagar	13-gun salute state	1540–1948	India
Nayagarh State		non-salute state	c.1500–1948	India
Nazargunj		non-salute state	1899–20th century	India
Nilgiri State		non-salute state	1125–1949	India
Orchha State		15-gun salute state	c.1501–1950	India
Orissa Tributary States		non-salute state	12th century–1948	India
Oudh State		non-salute, annexed by the British Raj	1732–1858	India
Pahra		non-salute state	1812–1948	India
Pal Lahara State		non-salute state	11th century–1948	India
Palanpur State		non-salute state	1370–1948	India
Paldeo		non-salute state	1812–1948	India
Palitana State		9-gun salute state	1194–1948	India
Panna State		11-gun salute state	1731–1950	India
Patdi State	Patdi	non-salute state	1741–1947	India
Patan, Rajasthan		non-salute state	12th–20th century	India
Pataudi State		non-salute state	1804–1947	India
Pathari State		non-salute state	1794–1948	India
Patiala State		17-gun salute state	1627–1948	India
Patna (princely state)		9-gun salute state	1191–1948	India
Pethapur State		non-salute state	13th century–1940	India
Phaltan State		non-salute state	1284–1948	India
Phulra(h)	Phulra(h)	non-salute state	1828–1950	Pakistan
Piploda State		non-salute state	1547–1948	India
Porbandar State		13-gun salute state	1193–1948	India
Pratapgarh State	Pratapgarh (Partabgarh)	15-gun salute state	1425–1949	India
Pudukkottai state		17-gun salute state	1680–1948	India
Punial State		non-salute state	up to 1974	Pakistan
Radhanpur State		11-gun salute state	1753–1948	India
Raigarh State		non-salute state	1625–1947	India
Rairakhol State		non-salute state	12th century–1948	India
Rajgarh State		11-gun salute state	late 15th century–1948	India
Rajgarh State		9-gun salute state	late 12th century–1948	India
Rajkot State		9-gun salute state	1620–1948	India
Rajpipla State		13-gun salute state	1340–1948	India
Rajpur, Baroda		non-salute state		India
Ramdurg State		non-salute state	1742–1948	India
Rampur State	Rampur	15-gun salute state	1774–1949	India
Ranasan State		non-salute state	17th century–1943	India
Ranpur State		non-salute state	17th century–1948	India
Ratlam State		13-gun salute state	1652–1948	India
Rewa (princely state)		17-gun salute state	c.1790–1948	India
Sachin State		9-gun salute state	1791–1948	India
S(h)ailana	Shailana (Sailana)	11-gun salute state	1736–1948	India
Sakti State		non-salute state	up to 1948	India
Sambalpur State		non-salute, annexed by the British Raj	1493–1848	India
Samthar State		11-gun salute state	1760–1950	India
Sandur State		non-salute state	1713–1949	India
Sangli State		9-gun salute state	1782–1948	India
Sant State		9-gun salute state	1255–1948	India
Saraikela State		non-salute state	1620–1948	India
Sarangarh State		non-salute state	up to 1948	India
Sardargarh Bantva		non-salute state	1733–1947	India
Savanur State		non-salute state	1672–1948	India
Sawantwadi State		9-gun salute state	1627–1948	India
Shahpura State		9-gun salute state	1629–1949	India
Siba State		non-salute, annexed by the British Raj	1450–1849	India
Sirmur State	Sirmür	11-gun salute state	1095–1948	India
Sirohi State		15-gun salute state	1405–1949	India
Sitamau State		11-gun salute state	1701–1948	India
Sohawal State		non-salute state	1550–1950	India
Somna State		non-salute state	19th century–1949	India
Sonepur State		9-gun salute state	1556–1948	India
Suket State	Sundar Nagar	11-gun salute state	765–1948	India
Surgana State		non-salute state	late 18th century–1948	India
Surguja State		non-salute state	1543–1948	India
Swat	Saidu Sharif	non-salute state	1858–1969	Pakistan
Talcher State		non-salute state	12th century–1948	India
Taraon State		non-salute state	1812–1948	India
Thanjavur Maratha kingdom		non-salute, annexed by the British Raj	1674–1855	India
Tigiria State		non-salute state	16th century–1948	India
Tonk State		non-salute state	1806–1949	India
Torawati		non-salute state	12th–20th century	India
Tori Fatehpur		non-salute state	1690–1950	India
Travancore	Tiruvidamkodu/Tiruvankur/Travancore) (Padmanabhapuram to 1795)	19-gun salute state	1729–1949	India
Tripura (princely state) (Hill Tipperah)	Agartala	13-gun salute state	1809–1949	India
Tulsipur State		non-salute, annexed by the British Raj	16th century–1859	India
Udaipur State (Mewar)	Udaipur	19-gun salute state	734–1949	India
Udaipur State, Chhattisgarh		non-salute state	1818–1948	India
Vala State		non-salute state	1740–1948	India
Varsoda		non-salute state	c.745–1947	India
Vijaynagar State	Vijayanagar (previously Ghodasar)	non-salute state	1577–1948	India
Vallbhapur State		non-salute state	16th century–1948	India
Wadagam State	Wadagam	non-salute state	18th century–1948	India
Wadhwan State	Wadhwan	9-gun salute state	1630–1948	India
Wankaner State (Vankaner)		11-gun salute state	1605–1948	India
Yasin State	Yasin	non-salute state	c1640–c1972	Pakistan

=== Indonesia ===
Indonesia is a republic, however several provinces or regencies preserves their own monarchy, although only Special Region of Yogyakarta retains actual administrative authority, the rest only holds cultural significance.

Administrative Monarchies (with actual administrative authority)

- Sultanate of Yogyakarta, Special Region of Yogyakarta
- Pakualaman, a princely state within Special Region of Yogyakarta

Ceremonial Monarchies (cultural, symbolic or historical significance only)

- Mangkualaman, it was divided out of the historical holdings of the royal family of Pakualaman on 23 August 2021 as a proposed settlement between royal claimants with KGPAA Mangku Alam Al-Haj Maulana Abdullah Khalifatullah Al-Jawi as head of the principality. The settlement is based on the historic restoration of the Merdiko Praja Mangkualaman Principality, which was established on March 7, 1822, by the Dutch East Indies colonial government.
- Surakarta Sunanate, Surakarta, Central Java
- Mangkunegaran, a princely state in Surakarta, Central Java
- Keraton Kasepuhan, Cirebon, West Java
- Keraton Kanoman, Cirebon, West Java
- Keraton Keprabonan, Cirebon, West Java
- Keraton Kacirebonan, Cirebon, West Java
- Sultanate of Riau-Lingga, Riau Islands
- Sultanate of Siak Sri Indrapura, Riau
- Sultanate of Deli, Medan, North Sumatra
- Pontianak Sultanate, Pontianak, West Kalimantan
- Sultanate of Banjar, Banjarmasin, South Kalimantan
- Kutai Sultanate, Kutai Kartanegara, East Kalimantan
- Bima Sultanate, Bima, Sumbawa Island, West Nusa Tenggara
- Ternate Sultanate, North Maluku

=== Philippines ===
Although the Philippines is a republic, the Southern Philippines have retained their monarchical traditions and are protected under the Indigenous Peoples' Rights Act of 1997.

- Sultanate of Sulu
- Sultanate of Maguindanao
- Confederate States of Lanao

== See also ==
- List of current monarchs
- Monarchies in Europe
- Monarchies in Africa
- Monarchies in the Americas
- Monarchies in Oceania
