= Central India Agency =

Agency of princely states in India

Coordinates: 26.22°N 78.17°E

- 1854–1947
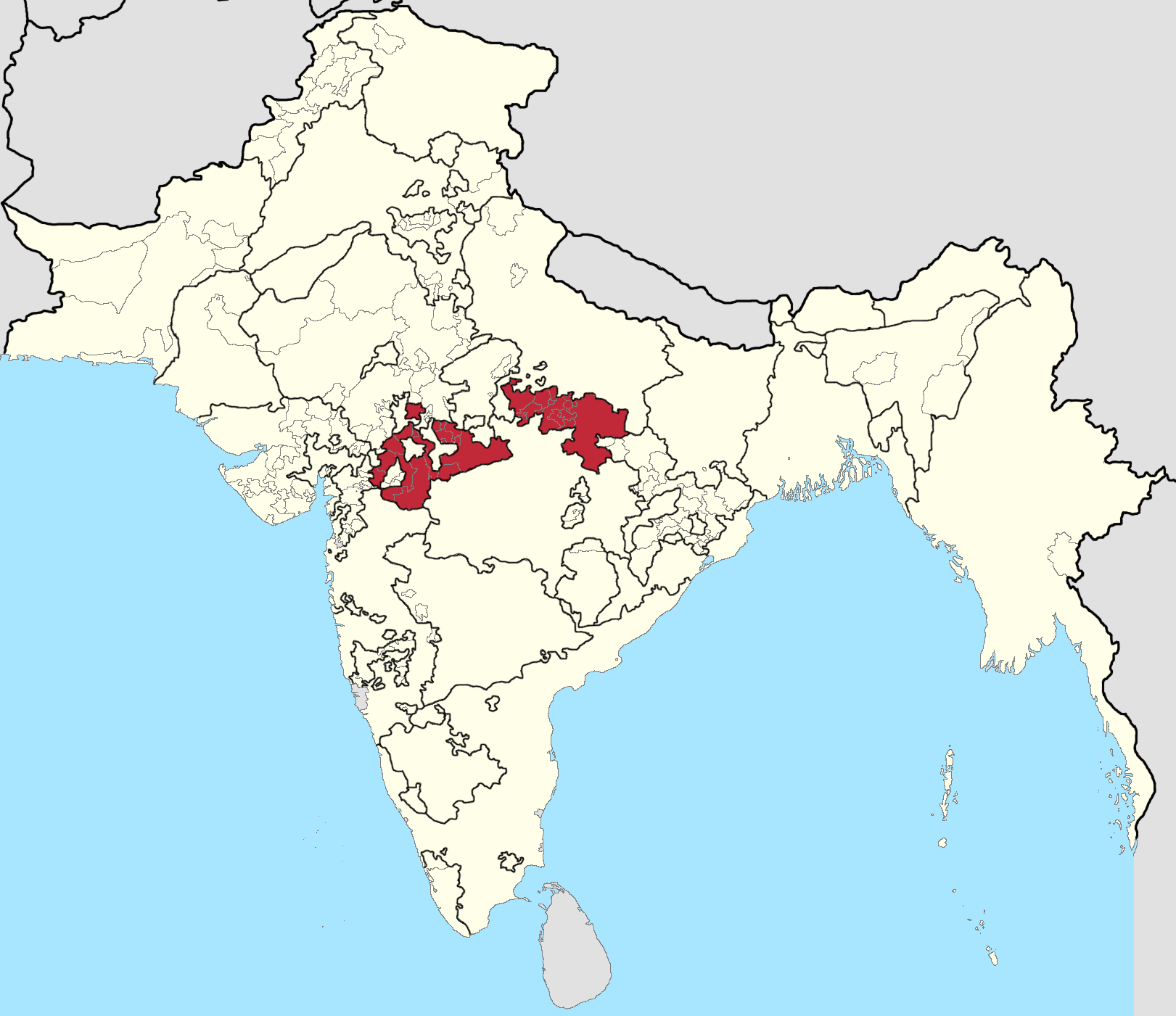
- The Central India Agency in the Indian Empire in 1942

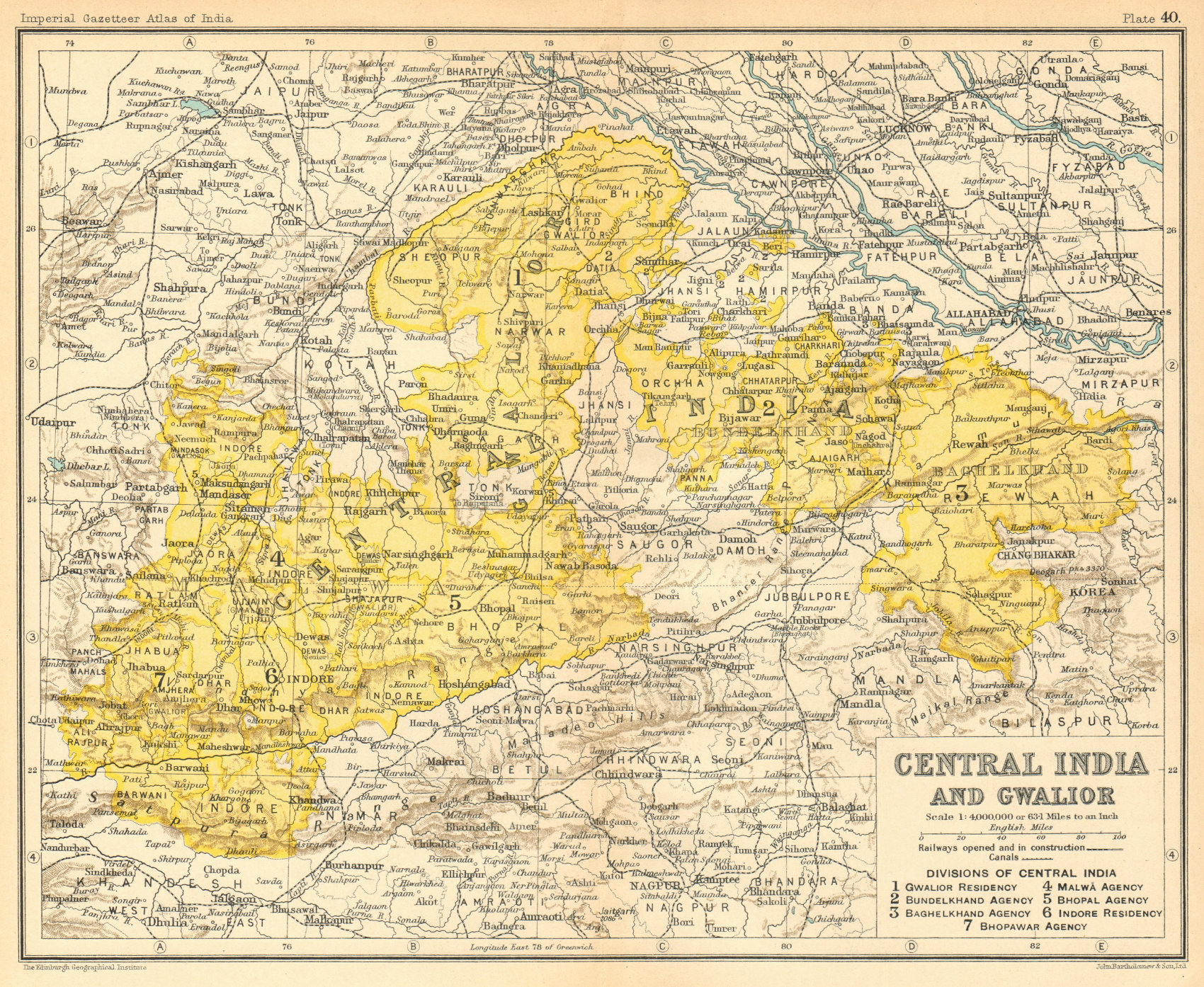
- Detailed map of Central India Agency in 1909 before separation of Gwalior Residency
- Capital: Indore
- States under AGG for Central India: Indore State; Bhopal State; Rewah State; Ratlam State; Sailana State; Other 85 states
- Government: Indirect imperial rule over a group of hereditary monarchies
- Agent to the Governor-General
  - 1854–1857 (first): Sir Robert Hamilton
- History
  - Merger of previous political offices: 1854
  - Accession to the Indian Union: 1947

Area
- 1901: 200,452 km^{2} (77,395 sq mi)

Population
  - 1901: 9,261,907
Preceded by
Malwa
Succeeded by
Gwalior Residency
Malwa Union
Bhopal State
Baghelkhand and Bundelkhand States Union
- This article incorporates text from a publication now in the public domain: Chisholm, Hugh, ed. (1911). "Central India". Encyclopædia Britannica (11th ed.). Cambridge University Press.

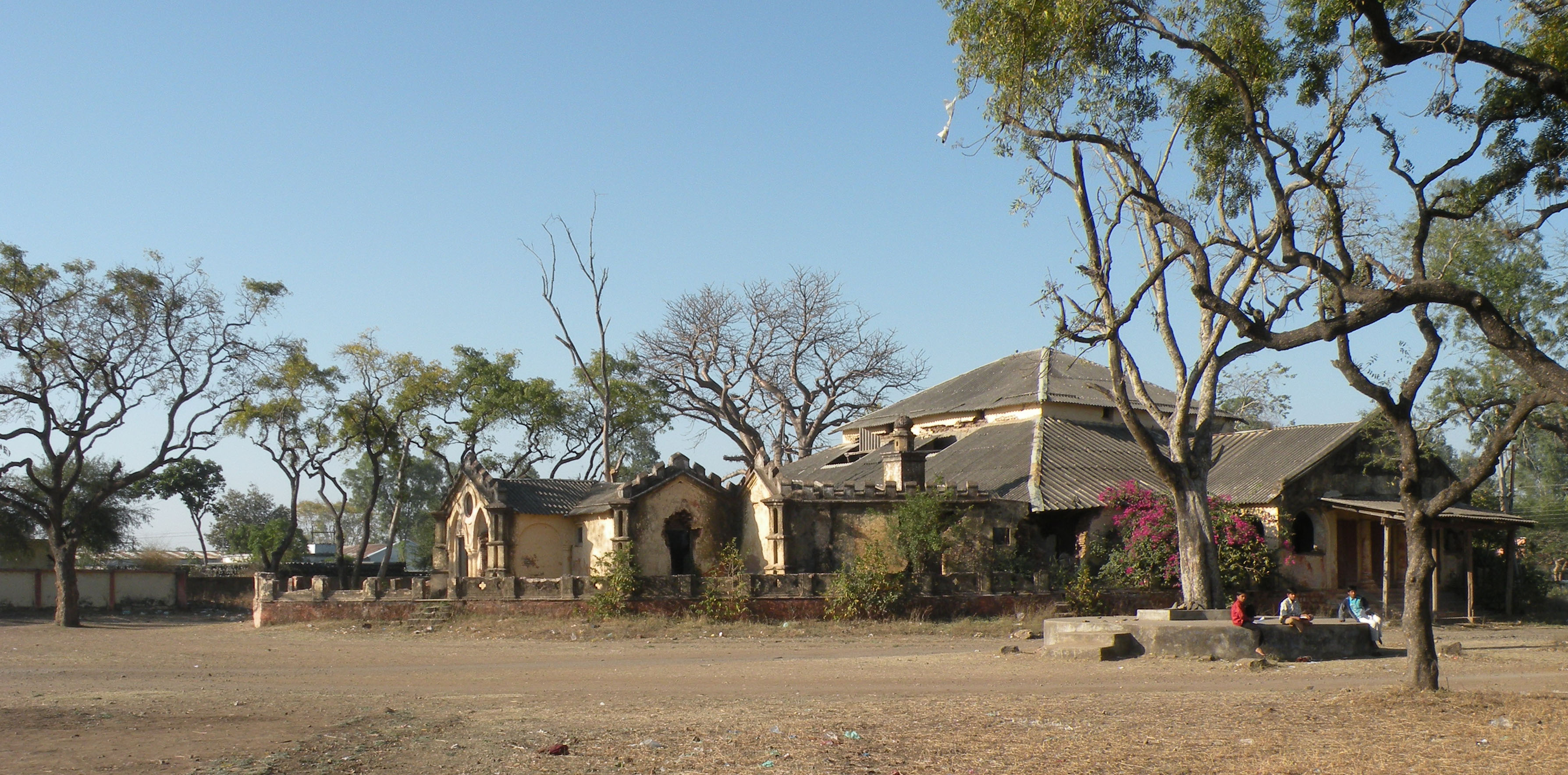
View of the Agency House in Dhar State, one of the former centres southwest. Lalitpur District, part of the United Provinces, split the Central India Agency into eastern and western portions.

The Central India Agency was created in 1854, by amalgamating the Western Malwa Agency with other smaller political offices which formerly reported to the Governor-General of India. The agency was overseen by a political agent who maintained relations of the Government of India with the princely states and influence over them on behalf of the Governor-General. The headquarters of the agent were at Indore.

== List of Divisions and Princely States/districts of Agency ==
=== Bundelkhand Agency ===
The Bundelkhand Agency was bounded by Bagelkhand to the east, the United Provinces to the north, Lalitpur District to the west, and the Central Provinces to the south. Bagelkhand Agency was separated from Bundelkhand in 1871. In 1900 it included 9 states, the most important of which were Orchha, Panna, Samthar, Charkhari, Chhatarpur, Datia, Bijawar and Ajaigarh. The agency also included 13 estates and the pargana of Alampur, the latter belonging to Indore State.

In 1931, all of the states under the Baghelkhand Agency apart from Rewa were transferred back to Bundelkhand.

Salute states, by precedence:

- Datia, title Maharaja, Hereditary salute of 15-guns
- Orchha, title Maharaja or Raja (from 1882, Saramad-i-Rajha-i-Bundelkhand Maharaja), Hereditary salute of 15-guns
- Ajaigarh, title Maharaja, Hereditary salute of 11-guns
- Baoni, title Nawab, Hereditary salute of 11-guns
- Bijawar, title Maharaja, Hereditary salute of 11-guns
- Charkhari, title Maharaja, Hereditary salute of 11-guns
- Panna, title Maharaja, Hereditary salute of 11-guns
- Samthar, title Raja, Hereditary salute of 11-guns

Non-salute states, alphabetically:

- Alipura, title Rao
- Beri (Beri-Bundelkhand), title Rao/Raja (originally Dewan)
- Bihat
- Chhatarpur, title Maharaja or Raja
- Garrauli
- Gaurihar, title Sardar Sawai; from 1859, Rao
- Jigni, title Rao
- Lugasi
- Naigawan Rebai
- Sarila, title Raja

Jagirs :

- Banka-Pahari
- Bijna
- Bilheri jagir, ?under Chhatarpur, guaranteed by the British
- Dhurwai
- Tori Fatehpur (one of the Hasht-Bhaiya jagirs)

Former princely States that were annexed or seized by the British :

- Banpur, seized in 1857, had been claimed by Gwalior State
- Bijeraghogarh, seized
- Chirgaon (one of the Hasht Bhaiya jagirs), seized
- Jalaun, annexed in 1840
- Jaitpur, annexed in 1849
- Jhansi, annexed in 1853
- Khaddi, annexed
- Purwa (one of the Chaube Jagirs), seized
- Tiroha, seized
- Shahgarh, seized in 1857

=== Bagelkhand Agency ===
Bagelkhand Agency, the easternmost charge, was established in March 1871, when it was separated from Bundelkhand agency. In 1900, it covered the area of twelve states, including :

Salute states, by precedence :

- Rewa, the largest state in Bagelkhand, title Maharaja, Hereditary salute of 17-guns
- Baraundha, title Raja, Hereditary salute of 9-guns
- Maihar, title Raja, Hereditary salute of 9-guns

Non-salute states (alphabetically) :

- Bhaisaunda
- Jaso
- Kamta-Rajaula
- Kothi
- Nagode
- Pahra
- Paldeo
- Sohawal
- Taraon

Zamindari Estates (alphabetically) :

- Sohagpur
- Shahpur
- Jaitpur
- Singrauli, also Nifs Singrauli (a mu'amaladari of 700 villages in Rewah) to distinguish it from a smaller zamindari in Singrauli Mirzapur District, North-Western Provinces in what is now eastern UP.)
- Amarkantak
- Nigwani
- Anupur
- Baikunthpur
- Chandiya
- Dhangawan
- Singbana

In 1931, all of the states but Rewa were transferred back to Bundelkhand, and in 1933 Rewa was transferred to the Indore Residency.

=== Gwalior Residency ===
Gwalior Residency was placed under the Central India Agency in 1854, and separated from it in 1911. Gwalior Residency included the following, among other smaller states, plus Chhabra pargana (district) of Tonk State:

Salute states:

- Gwalior, title Maharaja Scindia; Hereditary salute of 21-guns.
- Rampur, title Nawab; Hereditary salute of 15-guns
- Benares (Ramnagar), title Maharaja; Hereditary salute of 13-guns (15-guns local)

Non-salute states:

- Bhadaura
- Garha
- Khaniadhana
- Raghogarh
- Paron
- Umri

Lesser estates (under Thakurs or diwans):

- Agra Barkhera
- Kathaun
- Khiaoda
- Sangul Wardha
- Sirsi

=== Bhopal Agency ===
Bhopal Agency, 11,653 sq mi (30,180 km^{2}), which included the following :

Salute states, by precedence :

- Bhopal, title Nawab, Hereditary salute of 19-guns (21-guns local)
- Dewas Junior and Dewas Senior, title Maharaja, Hereditary salutes of 15-guns (transferred to Malwa Agency in 1907, and to Bhopal Agency in 1933)
- Narsinghgarh, title Raja, Hereditary salute of 11-guns
- Rajgarh, title Raja, Hereditary salute of 11-guns
- Khilchipur, title Raja, Hereditary salute of 9-guns

Non-salute states, alphabetically :

- Basoda
- Kurwai (Korwai)
- Makrai (transferred to Bhopal Agency in 1933 from the Central Provinces and Berar)
- Maksudangarh
- Muhammadgarh
- Pathari

=== Indore Residency ===
Indore Residency included most of Indore (Holkar) and after 1933 also Rewa State, the largest state from the Baghelkhand Agency.

=== Malwa Agency ===
Malwa Agency, 8,919 sq mi (23,100 km^{2}), which included parts of Gwalior, Indore and Tonk states and the states of:

Salute states, by precedence :

- Ratlam State, title Maharaja Bahadur, Hereditary salute of 13-guns (15-guns local)
- Jaora State, title Nawab, Hereditary salute of 13-guns
- Sailana State, title Raja Bahadur, Hereditary salute of 11-guns
- Jhabua State, title Raja, Hereditary salute of 11-guns
- Sitamau State, title Raja, Hereditary salute of 11-guns

Non-salute states :

- Piploda State

Estates :

- Panth-Piploda .

In 1925, the Malwa Agency was amalgamated with Bhopawar Agency.

=== Bhopawar Agency ===
Bhopawar Agency included the princely states of Malwa region: It also included territories of Gwalior and Indore States. In 1927 the agency was renamed the Southern States Agency, later the Southern States and Malwa Agency, and after 1934 Malwa Agency.

Salute states, by precedence :

- Dhar, title Maharaja, Hereditary salute of 15-guns

The following were the jagirs (estates), ruled by the Bhilala tribes, that were under the Suzerainty of Dhar State.:

1. Kali-Baori
2. Nimkhera (alias Tirla)
3. Rajgadh
- Alirajpur, title Raja, Hereditary salute of 11-guns, including the extinct State of Phulmaal which was incorporated into it earlier as well as Fiefs (Jagirs) of .
- Barwani, title Maharana, Hereditary salute of 11-guns
- Jhabua, title Raja, Hereditary salute of 11-guns

Estates :

- Jobat
- Kathiwara
- Mathwar
- Ratanmal
- Bakhatgarh
- Dotria
- Kachhi-Baroda
- Multhan

Discontinued :

- Amjhera, title Rao
- Chhadawad, title Rao

Jagirs (incomplete) :

- Jamnia, title Raja
- Kali-Baori
- Nimkhera
- Ondhwa
- Rajgadh
- Sondhwa

== Post-independence ==
Upon the British withdrawal from India in 1947, the rulers of the princely states in this area all chose to accede to the new Union of India. The eastern portion of Central India Agency, including Bagelkhand and Bundelkhand agencies, became the new state Vindhya Pradesh. The western portion, including Bhopal, Malwa, and Bhopawar agencies and the Gwalior and Indore residencies, became the new state of Madhya Bharat. Bhopal became a separate state. Makrai was transferred to Madhya Pradesh, which had been created from the former Central Provinces and Berar in 1950. In 1956, the states of Vindhya Pradesh, Madhya Bharat, and Bhopal were merged into Madhya Pradesh. Later another state, Chhattisgarh, was formed from the area that was formerly Madhya Pradesh.

== See also ==
- List of princely states of British India (alphabetical)
- List of Maratha dynasties and states
- List of Rajput dynasties and states
- Rajputana
