= Bundelkhand Agency =

Political agency in British India (1811–1948)

Coordinates: 25.05°N 79.43°E

- Agency of British India
- 1811–1948
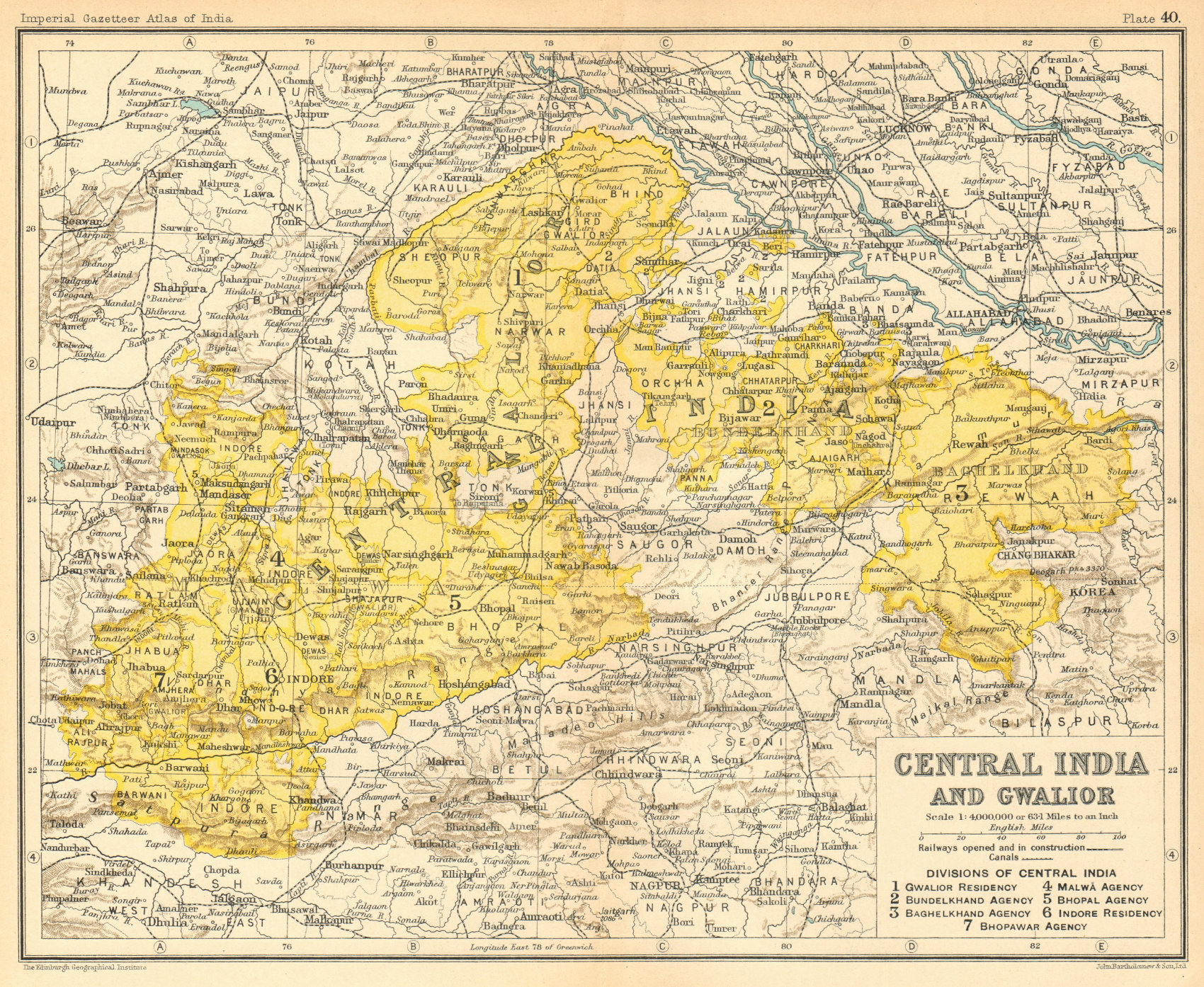
- Map of the Central India Agency with the Bundelkhand Agency in the eastern part
- Area
  - 1901: 25,510 km^{2} (9,850 sq mi)
- Population
  - 1901: 1,308,326
- History
  - Established: 1811
  - Independence of India: 1948
Succeeded by
India
- This article incorporates text from a publication now in the public domain: Chisholm, Hugh, ed. (1911). "Bundelkhand". Encyclopædia Britannica (11th ed.). Cambridge University Press.

The Bundelkhand Agency was a political agency of the British Raj, managing the relations of the British government with the protected princely states of the Bundelkhand region.

== History ==
=== Historical background ===
The Marathas ceded parts of Bundelkhand, which were later called later British Bundelkhand, to the British in the 1802 Treaty of Bassein. After 1802, many of the local rulers were granted sanads (leases) by the British, which entitled them to the lands they controlled at the death of Ali Bahadur, in return for the rulers signing a written bond of allegiance (ikrarnama) to the British. A political officer attached to the British forces in Bundelkhand supervised British relations with the sanad states. In 1806 British protection was promised to the Maratha ruler of Jhansi, and in 1817 the British recognized his hereditary rights to Jhansi state. In 1818 the Peshwa in Pune ceded all his rights over Bundelkhand to the British at the conclusion of the Third Anglo-Maratha War.

=== Creation of the agency ===
The sanad states were organized into the Bundelkhand Agency in 1811, when a political agent to the Governor-General of India was appointed and headquartered at Banda. In 1818 the headquarters were moved to Kalpi, in 1824 to Hamirpur, and in 1832 back to Banda. The political agent was placed under the authority of the Lieutenant-Governor of the North-Western Provinces, headquartered in Agra, in 1835. In 1849 authority over the Bundelkhand Agency was placed briefly under the Commissioner for the Saugor and Nerbudda Territories, who appointed a political assistant based at Jhansi. Shortly thereafter, authority over Bundelkhand was placed under the Resident at Gwalior, and the headquarters of the political assistant was moved to Nowgong, which remained until 1947. In 1853 the Raja of Jhansi died childless, and his territory was annexed to British Bundelkhand. The Jhansi State and the Jalaun and Chanderi districts were then formed into a superintendency. In 1854 Bundelkhand Agency was placed under the authority of the newly created Central India Agency, headquartered at Indore.

The widow of the Raja of Jhansi, Rani Lakshmi Bai, protested the annexation because she was not allowed to adopt an heir, and because the slaughter of cattle was permitted in the Jhansi territory. The Revolt of 1857 found Jhansi ripe for rebellion. In June a few men of the 12th native infantry seized the fort containing the treasure and magazine, and massacred the European officers of the garrison. The Rani put herself at the head of the rebels, and they captured several of the neighboring British districts and princely states allied to the British. She died bravely in battle in Gwalior in 1858. It was not till November 1858 that Jhansi was brought under British control.

After the revolt, Jhansi was given to the Maharaja of Gwalior, but came under British rule in 1886 when it was swapped for Gwalior fort. In 1865 the political assistant was replaced with a political agent. The eastern portion of the Agency was detached to form Bagelkhand Agency in 1871. The state of Khaniadhana was transferred to the authority of the Gwalior Resident in 1888, and in 1896 Baraundha, Jaso, and the Chaube Jagirs were transferred to Bagelkhand. In 1901 there were 9 states, 13 estates, and the pargana of Alampur belonging to Indore State, with a total area of 9,851 sq mi (25,510 km^{2}) and a total population of 1,308,326 in 1901. The most important of the states were Orchha, Panna, Samthar, Charkhari, Chhatarpur, Datia, Bijawar and Ajaigarh State. Deforestation accelerated during British rule. The population of the agency decreased 13% between 1891 and 1901 due to the effects of famine. In 1931 Bagelkhand Agency, with the exception of the state of Rewa State, was merged into the Bundelkhand Agency.

== Princely States ==
The Bundelkhand Agency was bounded by Bagelkand to the east, the United Provinces to the north, Lalitpur District to the west, and the Central Provinces to the south. The Bagelkhand Agency was separated from Bundelkhand in 1871. In 1900 it included 9 states, 13 estates and the pargana of Alampur belonging to Indore State. In 1931, all of the Baghelkhand Agency states were transferred back to Bundelkhand, except Rewa (title Maharaja, Hereditary salute of 15-guns)), which was placed under the authority of the Indore Residency.

Salute states, by precedence :

- Datia, title Maharaja, Hereditary salute of 15-guns
- Orchha, title (Maha)raja (from 1882, Saramad-i-Rajha-i-Bundelkhand Maharaja), Hereditary salute of 15-guns
- Ajaigarh, title Maharaja, Hereditary salute of 11-guns
- Baoni, title Nawab, Hereditary salute of 11-guns
- Bijawar, title Maharaja, Hereditary salute of 11-guns
- Charkhari, title Maharaja, Hereditary salute of 11-guns
- Panna, title Maharaja, Hereditary salute of 11-guns
- Samthar, title Raja, Hereditary salute of 11-guns

Non-salute states :

- Alipura, title Rao
- Beri (Beri-Bundelkhand), title Rao/Raja (originally Dewan)
- Bihat
- Chhatarpur, title (Maha)Raja
- Garrauli
- Gaurihar, title Sardar Sawai; from 1859, Rao
- Jigni, title Rao
- Lugasi
- Naigaon Rebai State
- Sarila, title Raja

Jagirs :

- Banka-Pahari
- Bijna
- Bilheri jagir, under Chhatarpur, guaranteed by the British
- Dhurwai, Raja Yadvendra Singh Judeo
- Tori Fatehpur (one of the Hasht-Bhaiya jagirs)
- Hansari title Raja
- Katera, Raja Bahadur Sardar Singh Bundela

== Former princely States that were annexed or seized ==
- Jalaun, annexed in 1840
- Jhansi, annexed in 1853
- Jaitpur, annexed in 1849
- Khaddi, annexed
- Chirgaon (one of the Hasht Bhaiya jagirs), seized
- Purwa (one of the Chaube Jagirs), seized
- Bijeraghogarh, seized
- Tiroha, seized
- Shahgarh, seized in 1857
- Banpur, seized in 1857, had been claimed by Gwalior State but the claim was refused. Finally in 1860 it was ceded to Gwalior by means of a treaty in which part of the territory went to Jhansi.

== See also ==
- Bundela
- Central India Agency
