= Bhandaria (disambiguation) =

Bhandaria is a town in Pirojpur District of Bangladesh.

Bhandaria may also refer to:

== Bangladesh ==
- Bhandaria Government College, a state university in the above town
- Bhandaria Upazila (Bengali: ভাণ্ডারিয়া ), an Upazila of Pirojpur District, Division of Barisal

== India ==
- Bhandaria, Bhavnagar, a village in Bhavnagar Taluka of Bhavnagar district, Gujarat
- Bhandaria State, a former Kamliya Ahir princely state with seat in the above town
- Bhandaria, Garhwa (Hindi: भंडरिया), a taluka (administrative block) of Garhwa district, Jharkhand

== See also ==
- Bandāra
