= Saroj Kumari Gaurihar =

Indian writer and politician (1929–2022)

- Born: Saroj Kumari; 1929; Agra, United Provinces, British India
- Died: 28 August 2022 (aged 93); Agra, Uttar Pradesh, India
- Education: MA, LLB
- Occupations: Writer, Politician
- Notable work: Anand Chhalia; Mandvi Ek Vismrita
- Title: Member of Legislative Assembly from Chandla
- Term: 1967—1972
- Movement: Quit India Movement (1943)

Rani Saroj Kumari Gaurihar (1929 – 28 August 2022) was an Indian writer, politician and freedom fighter. She hailed from the former princely state of Gaurihar. She served as a Member of the Madhya Pradesh Legislative Assembly representing the Chandla Assembly constituency from 1967 to 1972. She participated in India's movement of freedom struggle and was jailed once during the freedom movement. She died on 28 August 2022, at the age of 93. She was the last Rajmata and last queen of Gaurihar State. Her notable works include Anand Chhalia and Mandvi Ek Vismrita, both poetry collections.

== Early life and education ==
Gaurihar was born in 1929 to Jagan Prasad Rawat and Satyavati Rawat in Kacheri Ghat locality of Agra, Uttar Pradesh. She completed her education with an MA and LLB.

== Career ==
In 1968, Gaurihar was the President of the All India Braj Sahitya Parishad. She was elected as an MLA from Chandla Assembly constituency, where she held her legislator post from 1967 to 1972. He also made a lot of efforts to develop the area during her tenure as an MLA.

Her parents were freedom fighters. She participated in the Quit India Movement in 1942. She was imprisoned for a year in 1943, along with her parents. Saroj Kumari was chairperson of Nagari Pracharni in Agra.

As a litterateur, she published a series of books through the Udayan Sharma Foundation Trust. She composed poetic works like Anand Chhalia and Mandvi Ek Vismrita.

== Personal life and death ==
Gaurihar was married to Raja Pratap Singh Bhudev of Gaurihar, a small princely state of Bundelkhand. Her father Jagan Prasad Rawat was a freedom fighter who later served as a minister in the Uttar Pradesh government.

Gaurihar died in Agra on 28 August 2022, at the age of 93. The Chief Minister Of Madhya Pradesh, Shivraj Singh Chauhan, conveyed his condolences and said, "Rani Saroj did yeoman service in the field of literature for a long time by remaining associated with a standard magazine like "Mamuliya" and Bundeli literature, which is inspiring". BJP MLA and Minister Vishwas Sarang also expressed his condolences on her death. The Union Minister of State for Law and Justice, Prof. S. P. Singh Baghel, Cabinet Minister Baby Rani Maurya and MLA Purshottam Khandelwal reached her home to pay her tribute.
