= Gourihar =

Town in Madhya Pradesh, India

Gaurihar
- Town
- Location in Madhya Pradesh, India
- Coordinates: 25.26°N 80.19°E
- Country: India
- State: Madhya Pradesh
- District: Chhatarpur
- Postal code: 471405
- Vehicle registration: MP-16

Gaurihar is a town and a tehsil of Chhatarpur district of Madhya Pradesh. It is located in the Bundelkhand region of Madhya Pradesh and is adjacent to Uttar Pradesh.

== History ==
This family is descended from Raja Ram Tiwari, who was governor of a fort in the service of Guman Singh, ancestor of the Maharajas of Ajaigarh. During the anarchy of the times, Raja Ram rebelled and for a short while held the fort successfully against Ali Bahadur I Gaurihar was Kanykubj Brahmin of Jhujautiya division Tiwari ruling state. Gaurihar state was founded in 1807 after a split from Ajaigarh State. Pratap Singh Judev signed the accession to the Indian Union on 1 January 1950. Maharaja Pratap Singh Judev was the last ruler of Gaurihar state.

== Geography ==
Gaurihar is located on 25.26°N 80.19°E, It has an average elevation of 508 metres (1669 feet). It's 90 km away from Chhatarpur.

== Demographics ==
As of the Census of India 2011 Gaurihar town has population of 5,128 of which 2,623 are males while 2 505 are females. A total of 1,094 families reside in the town. The average sex ratio of Gaurihar village is 955. In Gaurihar, male literacy stands at 84.87% while the female literacy rate was 66.74%.

== See also ==
- Gaurihar State
- Chhatarpur District
