= Jaitpur, Kulpahar =

Jaitpur
- Village
- Location in Uttar Pradesh, India Jaitpur (India)
- Coordinates: 25°16′52″N 79°30′45″E
- Country: India
- State: Uttar Pradesh
- District: Mahoba district
- Subdistrict: Kulpahar

Government
  - Body: Gram panchayat

Languages
  - Official: Hindi
- Time zone: UTC+5:30 (IST)
- Vehicle registration: UP
- Website: up.gov.in

Jaitpur is a village in Kulpahar sub-district of Uttar Pradesh. It lies at a distance of 10 km from Kulpahar on Kulpahar-Nowgong Highway. The famous Belasagar lake is situated in this village.

== History ==
Jaitpur was the former capital of Jaitpur State, one of the former princely states in the British Empire in India. There were two forts in the area. In Jaitpur Bajirao peshwa defeated mughal general Muhaamad Khan Bangash In 1729.
