= Bhandaria Government College =

Coordinates: 22.4867°N 90.0653°E

- Other name: BGC
- Motto: Truth Affection Modesty
- Type: University college
- Established: 1970
- Principal: Agriculturist Prf Mahbub Alam
- Location: Bhandaria, Pirojpur, Bangladesh
- Campus: College Road, Bhandaria
- Website: www.bhandariagovtcollege.com

Bhandaria Government College (Bengali: ভান্ডারিয়া সরকারি কলেজ '), located in Bhandaria, is one of renowned college of southern Bangladesh. It is a university level college where students besides class 12, they can attend into bachelor courses as well. The college has a hostel for boys just beside the college campus. It has nearly 600 students studying in intermediate level and another 200 are attending in honours courses under National University.

== Department ==
The college was upgraded to a University College in 2016.

Honours (pass) courses :

1.[Business Management]

3.[Political Sciences]

5. Business Studies along with Intermediate level on Science, Arts and Commerce.

== History ==
The college was established in 1970 and was declared governmental institution at 1985. n 17 acres of land. The college was nationalized in 1986.

== See also ==
•Brojomohun College
