= Naigaon Rebai State =

- 1807–1949
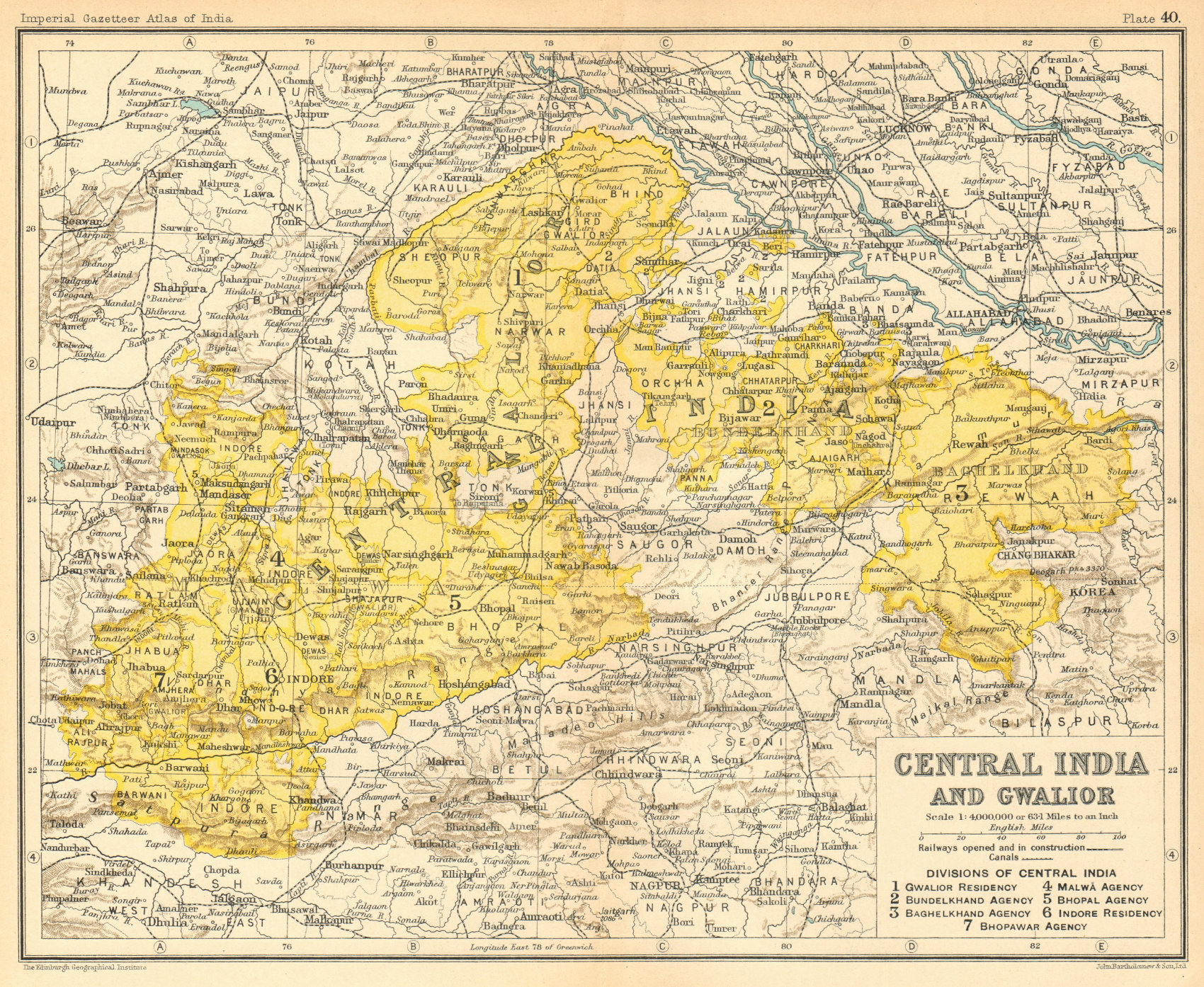
- Rebai in the Imperial Gazetteer of India
- Status: Princely state
- Capital: Naigaon Rebai
- Common languages: Hindi
- Raja
  - 1807-1808: Lakshman Singh
  - 1935-1947: Ratan Singh
- History
  - Established: 1807
  - Acceded to India: 1949

Area
  - Total: 31 km^{2} (12 sq mi)
- Currency: Indian Rupee
Succeeded by
Dominion of India

The Naigaon-Rebai or Naigawan-Rebai was one of the princely states of India during the period of the British Raj. Naigaon Rebai was ruled by Ahirs who formed the ruling dynasty of the state

== Origin and History ==
The state was founded in 1807 by Lakshman Singh. He was a chieftain who rebelled against British. When the British took control of Bundelkhand, they asked the rebel chieftains to surrender and put a condition of giving jagirdari in return. He then obtained a charter (sanad) of villages from the British Raj. He made Naigawan Rebai as the centre of the jagir. He died in 1808 and was succeeded by his son Jagat Singh.

=== Jagat Singh ===
Jagat Singh became chief of state in 1808 and was crowned with title of "Sawai". In 1850 it was held that Lakshman Singh's tenure was for life only, and that the holding should have been resumed on his death. Jagat Singh was, however, allowed to continue in possession and in 1862 this ruling was reversed and the jagirdar received an adoption sanad.

He remained in power till he died in 1867. After that Larai Dulhaiya became the holder of state, she was widow of Jagat Singh, who succeeded in 1867.

=== Larai Dulhaiya ===
Larai Dulhaiya succeeded in 1867 with the sanction of Government, though no woman had before held the position of ruling chief in Bundelkhand. She had 6 cavalry, 51 foot soldiers and 1 cannon.

In 1893 Larai Dulhaiya adopted Viswanath Singh, who was born in 1881 to a distant relative of the Naigawan Rebai Raj family : the adoption was sanctioned by the British Government and his right of succession to Larai Dulhaiya was recognised.

=== Vishwanath Singh ===
Vishwanath Singh succeeded Larai Dulhaiya in 1908. He was granted administrative power on 8 March 1909. Vishwanath Singh expanded the Jagirdari, Now the area of state (jagir) was about 12-25 square miles, which included more than 12 villages and the revenue was Rs. 17,000. Vishwanath Singh married three times, all the three marriages being with the daughters of the same family in Sarila. He died on 1 June 1935 and was succeeded by his adopted son Ratan Singh, who was born on 16 February 1913.

=== Ratan Singh ===
Ratan Singh was most probably the last Jagirdar of Naigawan Rebai state. After the Independence, princely state was merged with Republic of India in 1949.

== See also ==
- Bhandariya
- Satanones
- Kovaya
