= Hansari =

Village in Uttar Pradesh, India

- Town
- Location in Uttar Pradesh Location in India
- Coordinates: 25.4128°N 78.5672°E
- Country: India
- State: Uttar Pradesh
- District: Jhansi
- Block: Babina
- Established: 1779

Population (2001)
  - Total: 15,128
- Time zone: UTC+5:30 (IST)

Hansari was a village of Babina Block in Jhansi district, now evolved as a suburb of Jhansi District, Uttar Pradesh, India.

== Demographics ==
As of 2001 India census, the town had a population of 15,128 of which 8,102 were males while 7,026 were females as per report released by Census India 2001.

The town had an average literacy rate of 59.66%; with male literacy of 37.48% and female literacy of 21.97%. 16.05% of the population was under 6 years of age.

== History ==
Hansari constituted a substantial jagir, comprising fifty villages within India during the British Raj, and was administratively integrated into the Bundelkhand Agency of Central India. Governed by the Dauwanshi Bhatelas. Thakur clan of [[Yaduvanshi Aheer|Yaduvanshi]] Kshatriya. It constituted an inseparable part of the princely state of Orchha, ceded to the Bhatelas by the rulers of Orchha in 1779. In 1930, the British authorities conferred the honorific title of Raja upon the jagirdars of Hansari.

His Highness Raja Saheb Dada Narayan Singh, a distinguished scion of this familial lineage, was accorded the esteemed title of H.H. "Raja Saheb" by the British Raj . Throughout his political tenure, Dada Narayan Singh fostered significant affiliations with the former Indian Prime Minister, Indira Gandhi. Smt. Sudha Singh Ji was the only daughter of Narayan Singh. Raja Surendra Singh was the nephew who controlled the estate later on.

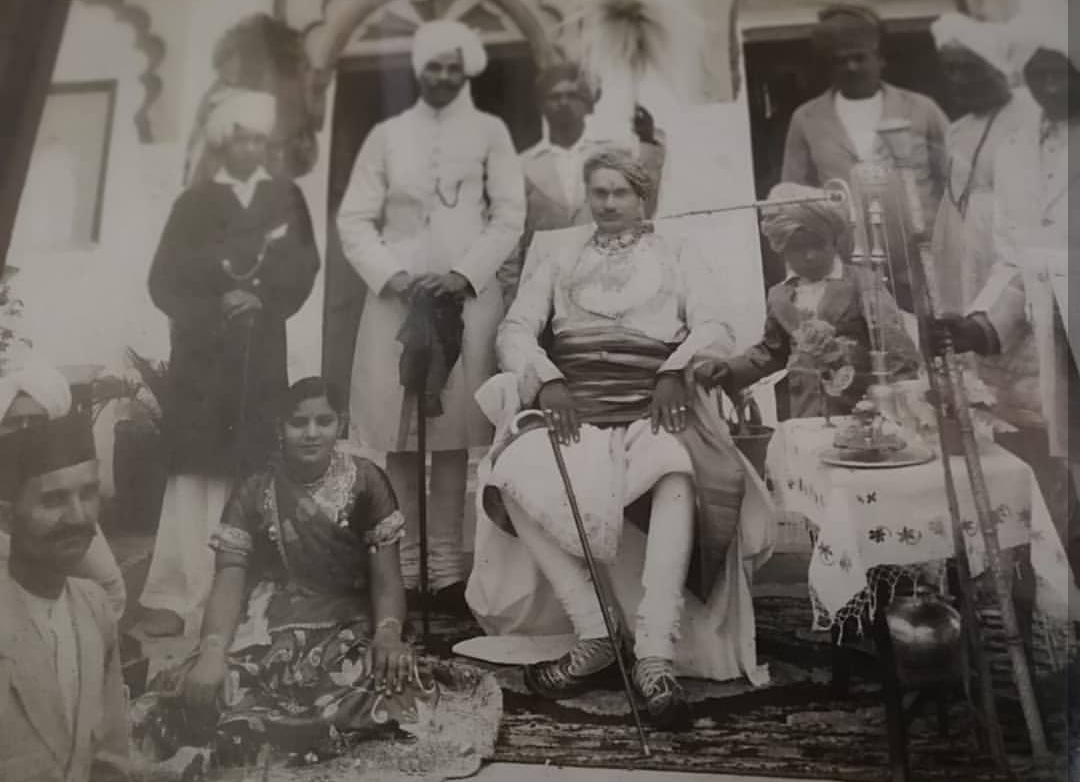
Raja Narayan Singh ji at durbar known as kacheri

== Utanga Hanuman Ji Temple ==
Uttanga Hanuman Ji Temple is an ancient temple Of Hanuman Ji in Hansari, Uttangha Wale Hanuman ji is regarded as the guardian Of Jagirdars Of Hansari. Avadh kunwari devoted the land for the construction of temple and built the temple of lord Hanuman ji.

== Rulers ==
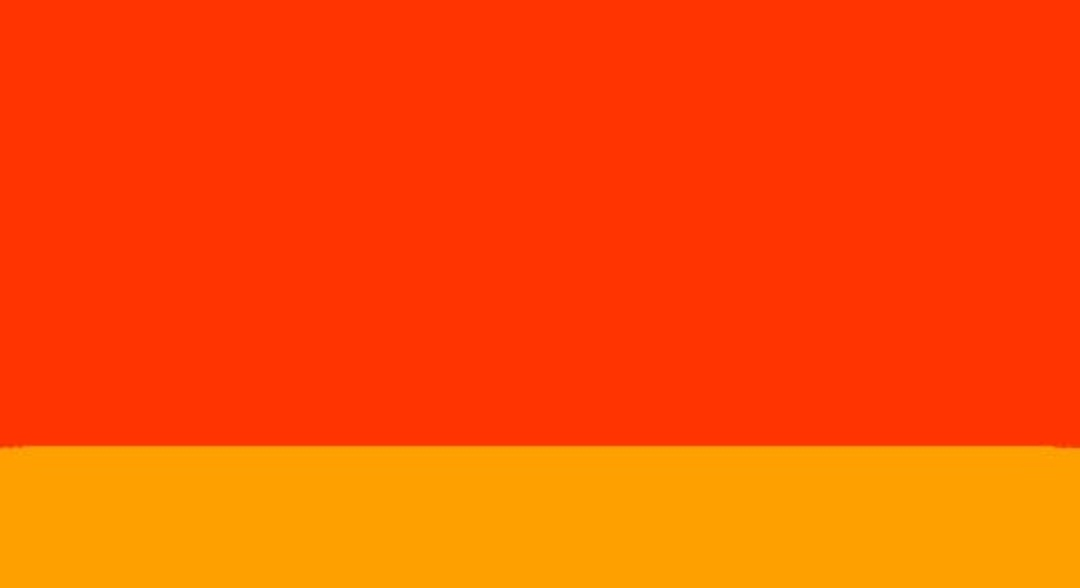
Flag of hansari jagir

- Kunwar Bhadur Singh (Diwan Of Orchha state, founder of Hansari Jagir) (1779-1791)
- Kunwar Ranjit Singh (1791-1821)
- Kunwar Raghvendra Singh (1821-1861)
- Kunwar Bar Singh (1861-1891)
- Kunwar Amar Singh (1891-1895)
- Kunwar Praan Singh (1895-1901)
- Kunwar Mazboot Singh (1901-1918)
- Kunwar Devi Singh (1918-1922)
- Kunwarani Avadh Bai (1922-1927)

In 1930, the British awarded the rulers of Hansari with the title of Raja

- Raja Narayan Singh (1927-1950)
1. Now its fully in control of indian government
