= Dewan =

Powerful government official in the context of Islamic history

Dewan (also known as diwan, sometimes spelled devan or divan) designated a powerful government official, minister, or ruler. A dewan was the head of a state institution of the same name (see Divan). Diwans belonged to the elite families in the history of Mughal and post-Mughal India and held high posts within the government.

== Etymology ==
The word is Persian in origin and was loaned into Arabic. The original meaning was "bundle (of written sheets)", hence "book", especially "book of accounts", and hence "office of accounts", "custom house", "council chamber". The meaning of the word, divan "long, cushioned seat" is due to such seats having been found along the walls in Middle Eastern council chambers. It is a common surname among Sikhs in Punjab.

== Council ==
The word first appears under the Caliphate of Omar I (A.D. 634–644). As the Caliphate state became more complicated, the term was extended over all the government bureaus.

The divan of the Sublime Porte was the council or Cabinet of the state. In the Ottoman Empire, it consisted of the usually (except in the Sultan's presence) presiding Grand Vizier and other viziers, and occasionally the Janissary Ağa.

In 19th-century Romania, the Ad hoc Divan was a body which played a role in the country's development towards independence from Ottoman rule.

In Malay (including Indonesian) and related languages (such as Javanese, Minangkabau, etc.), the borrowed word "dewan" is the standard word for council, as in the Dewan Perwakilan Rakyat (or Indonesia's Council of People's Representatives) and Dewan Undangan Negeri (State Legislative Assembly of Malaysia), Dewan Rakyat (House of Representatives of Malaysia), and Dewan Negara (Senate of Malaysia).

== South Asia ==
=== Mughal Empire ===
During the effective rule of Mughal India, the Dewan served as the chief revenue officer of a province.

Later, when most vassal states gained various degrees of self-determination, the finance — and/or chief minister and leader of many princely states (especially Muslim, but also many Hindu, including Baroda, Hyderabad, Mysore, Kochi, Travancore — referred to as Dalawa until 1811) became known as a dewan.

Exceptionally, a ruler was himself titled Dewan or a loftier variation, notably:

- in Beri-Bundelkhand
- in Dhurwai
- in Jaso (Jassu) and in Bandhora (which was split from the former c. 1750)
- in Khilchipur until 1873, then Rai Bahadur
- in Junagadh, where Shah Nawaz Bhutto was the prime minister of the former princely state.
- Diwan Sahib or Diwan Bahadur in Garrauli State

=== Maratha period ===
As a title used in various Early Modern Indian states, Diwan denoted the highest officials in the court after the king; the suffix -ji is added as a mark of respect in India. In the major Maratha states of Baroda (ruled by the Gaekwad), Gwalior (ruled by Scindias or Shinde), Indore (ruled by Holkar), and Nagpur (ruled by Bhonsle, but not from the Chhatrapati Shivaji family), the highest officer after the king was called the Diwan.

One of the examples – Shrimant Diwan/Rao Bahadur Atmaram Kulkarni, was the Diwan (Prime Minister) of Maratha Jamkhandi State. In the 19th century, the British Parliament established in British India a supreme court for revenue matters (non-criminal matters) named the "Sudder Dewanny Adawlut", which applied Hindu law.

=== Among Hindus and Sikhs of Punjab and Bengal ===
Dewan, Diwan, Divan, or Deo was the hereditary title borne by the Chief Minister of the Hindu Cooch State in the Bengal region.

Diwan also became a surname of high-caste Hindus or Sikhs in the Punjab region.

=== Chhattisgarhi Rajput-Brahmins ===
There is also a community with the surname Diwan found in Chhattisgarh, near the Bilaspur and Janjgir-Champa regions. This is a Brahmin-Rajput community descendant from Deo Brahmin-Rajputs who migrated from Purvanchal in Uttar Pradesh. The males in this community take the title Dhar (e.g., Mohan Dhar Diwan, a high-ranked member of Vishwa Hindu Parishad). They had a fight with the royal family of Ratanpur, defeated the king, and started ruling the Ratanpur estate.

=== Diwani in British India ===
After the Battle of Buxar, when Bengal was annexed by the East India Company in 1764, the Mughal Emperor granted the Company the Diwani (the right to collect revenue) in Bengal and Bihar in 1765. The term Diwani thus referred to British (fiscal) suzerainty over parts of India during the early British Raj.

=== Diwani in French India ===
In French India, one of its constituent colonies, Yanaon, had Zamindar and Diwan. They were active in its local and municipal administration during French rule. The Zamindar of Yanam was given a four-gun salute by French counterparts.

- Zamindar — Manion Canacaya
- Diwan — Bouloussou Soubramaniam Sastroulou
- Sovereignty — French Colonial Empire

=== Nepal ===
The document dated Bikram Samvat 1833 Bhadra Vadi 3 Roj 6 (i.e. Friday 2 August 1776), shows that Vamsharaj Pande and Swaroop Singh Karki had carried the title of Dewan (equivalent to Prime Minister) of the Kingdom of Nepal.
