= Jobat State =

Indian princely state

Coordinates: 22.42°N 74.57°E

Jobat State जोबत रियासत
- Princely State
- 15th century–1948
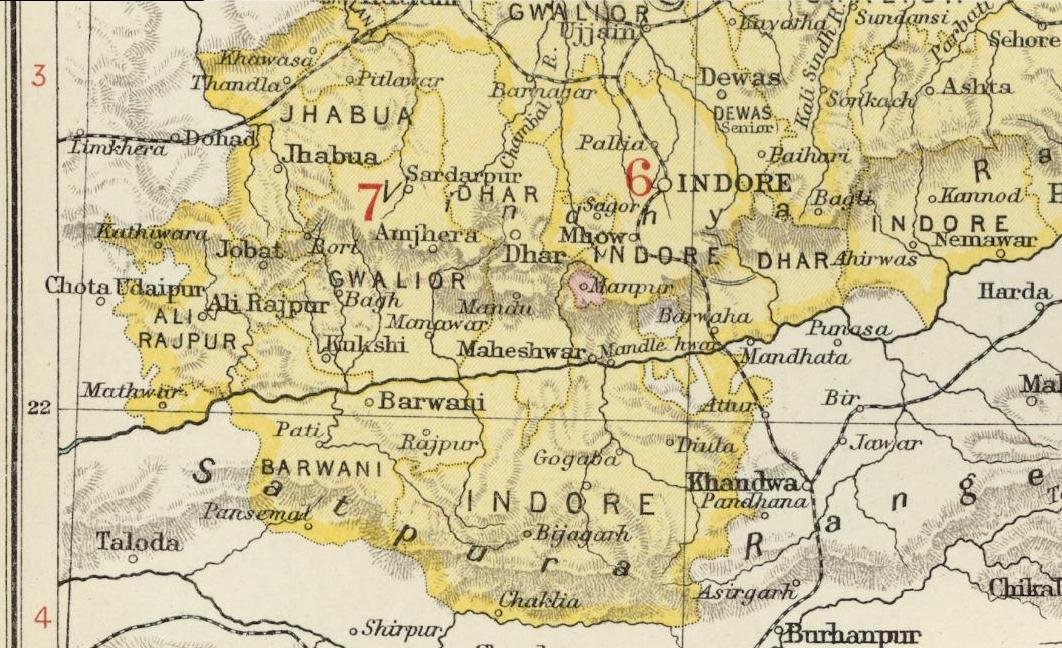
- Jobat State in the Imperial Gazetteer of India
- Area
  - 1901: 339 km^{2} (131 sq mi)
- Population
  - 1901: 9,443
- History
  - Established: 15th century
  - Accession to the Union of India: 1948
Succeeded by
India

Jobat State was a princely state in India during the British Raj. It was placed administratively under the Bhopawar Agency subdivision of the Central India Agency. The state covered an area of 339 square kilometres and had a population of 9.443 which produced an average revenue of Rs.21,000 in 1901.

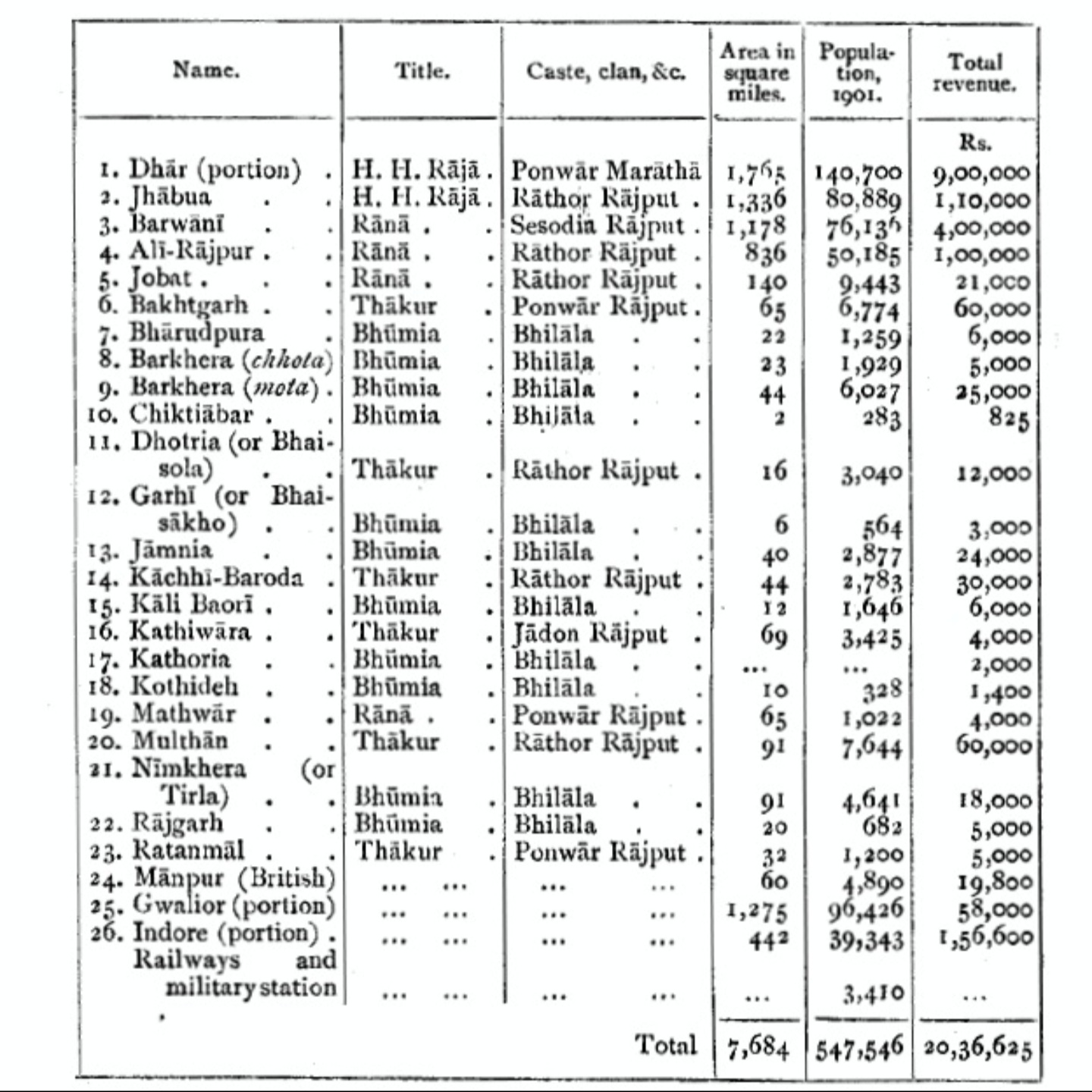
Jobat State and the Bhopawar Agency

== Ranas ==
- Rana Bahhram Dev
- Rana Keshavdas Dev
- Rana Loonkaran Dev
- 1864 – 1874 Ranjit Singh
- 1874 – 1897 Sarup Singh
- 1897 – Mar 1916 Indrajit Singh
- 18 Jun 1917 – 15 Aug 1947 Bhim Singh (b. 1917 – d. 1968)
