= Bihat State =

Bihat State was a princely state in India during the British Raj, controlled by the Bundelkhand Agency.

== Raos of Bihat State ==
The rulers of Bihat State were called Raos.

- Diwan Aparbal Singh, before 1807–1807
- Rao Bankat Rao, 1807–1828
- Rao Kamod Singh, 1828–1846
- Hardi Sah 1846–1859
- Govind Das 1859–1872
- Rao Mahum Singh 1872-after 1892

== See also ==
- Political integration of India
