= Nimkhera =

Nimkhera (or Neemkheda; Hindi नीमखेड़ा) was one of the petty princely states.

== History ==
Nimkhera was under administrative control of salute state Dhar, initially as a Bhumiate Zamindar estate, like Jamnia.

It covered 233 Square Kilometers km^{2}, comprising 91 villages, with a population at one point of 8,276, and a revenue of 18,000 Rupees in 1891.

Under the British Raj, it was part of the colonial Bhopawar Agency. The privy purse was fixed at 47,011 Rupees, it ceased to exist by accession to Madhya Pradesh

== Rulers ==
=== Bhumias ===
- Sheo Singh, Bhumia of Nimkhera,
- Bhima Singh, Bhumia of Nimkhera, son of the above
- Kanak Singh, adopted by the above, Bhumia of Nimkhera 1853/1864, in 1863, the British Government sanctioned the adoption of his cousin, Kunwar Dhario Singh; died childless in 1864
- Dhario Singh, Bhumia of Nimkhera 1864/1894, born 1861, adopted by his cousin above, whom he succeeded

=== Thakurs ===
- Thakur INDRAJIT Singh, (first) Thakur of Nimkhera 1894/1919, son of the above last Bhumia
- Thakur DAULAT Singh, Thakur of Nimkhera 1919/1922, born 1889, succeeded 26 October 1918, succeeded his above brother
- Thakur Saheb GANGA Singh, Thakur of Nimkhera 1922/- , born 1911 and succeeded 27 March 1922, 27th in descent from Rao Bawalji; last actual ruler

The line is nominally continued :

- Thakur Saheb Surendra Singh, Thakur of Nimkhera, son of the above

== See also ==
- Neemkheda Stadium, a cricket ground in Jabalpur, Madhya Pradesh
