= Garrauli State =

Coordinates: 24.766°N 79.208°E

Garrouli; Hindi Name गर्रौली) is a fort and former princely state in present Madhya Pradesh, central India.

== History ==
Garrauli became a princely state in 1812, when a sanad (feudal deed) from the British Government was granted to its first Diwan Bahadur, Gopal Singh, second son of Thakur Bhagwant Singh of Mahewa.

The state maintained a military force of 2 cavalry, 56 infantry and 4 guns. The founder and his succeeding descendants bore the style Diwan Sahib or Diwan Bahadur.

Garrauli was a non-salute state, in the charge of the colonial Bundelkhand Agency. It had a population of 5,231 in 1901, a revenue of 25,000 Rupees and surface of 101 km2. It ceased to exist de facto when the states were seized in 1947, and formally on 3 March 1948 by accession to India. The privy purse was fixed at 34,000 Rupees.

== Rulers ==
- Gopal Singh, 1st Diwan Sahib of Garrauli 1812 – death 1830.
- Parichhat Singh, son of the above, 2nd Diwan Sahib of Garrauli 1831, created Diwan Bahadur 17.10.1844, died 1884
- Chandrabhan Singh, born 2 April 1883, son of the son of the above, 3rd Diwan Sahib of Garrauli 19 October 1884; Honorable Captain of Chhatrasal Infantry (Panna) 1925; died 20 November 1946
- Raghuraj Singh, son of the above, born 16 January 1910, 4th Diwan Sahib of Garrauli 1946
- Raja RAVINDRA SINGH, 5th Diwan Sahib of Garrauli since 17 September 1964, born 19 February 1957.
