= Jaitpur State =

Historic Indian princely state

Coordinates: 25°16′52″N 79°30′45″E

Jaitpur State जैतपुर रियासत
- Princely State of British India
- 1731–1849
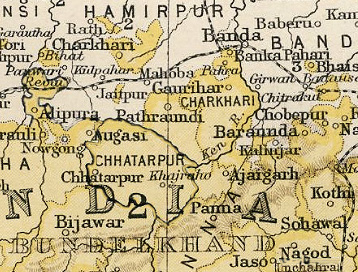
- Jaitpur State in the Imperial Gazetteer of India
- Capital: Jaitpur
- History
  - Established as division of Panna State: 1731
  - Annexed by the British Raj: 1849
Succeeded by
Presidencies and provinces of British India
- Today part of: Uttar Pradesh, India

Jaitpur State was a princely state in the Bundelkhand region. It was centered on Jaitpur, in present-day Mahoba district, Uttar Pradesh, which was the capital of the state. There were two forts in the area.

The last Raja died without issue and Jaitpur State was subsequently annexed by the British Raj.

== History ==
Jaitpur state was founded in 1731 by Jagat Rai, son of the famous Bundela Rajput leader Chhatrasal, as a division of Panna State. In 1765, Ajaigarh State was separated from Jaitpur. Following the British occupation of Central India Jaitpur became a British protectorate in 1807.

=== Maratha Conquest ===
In the year 5 May 1746 Maratha generals Malhar Rao Holkar and Jayappa Scindia besieged Jaitpur and Conquered it and appointed Laxman Shankar a treaty was concluded between Peshwa and Jagatraj Bundela.

When Khet Singh, the state's last ruler, died without issue in 1849, the principality was annexed by the British.

=== Rulers ===
The rulers of Jaitpur State bore the title 'Raja'.

==== Rajas ====
- 1731 – 1758 Jagat Raj
- 1758 – 1765 keerat singh
- 1765 – .... Gajraj
- .... – 1812 kesri raj
- 1812 – 1842 Parichat Singh
- 1842 – 1849 Khet Singh (d. 1849)

== See also ==
- Doctrine of Lapse
- Panna State
