= Dhurwai State =

Indian princely state (1690–1950)

Dhurwai Estate(jagir) Dhurwai State
- Princely Estate (Jagir) until 1800. Princely State during the British Raj
- 1690–1950
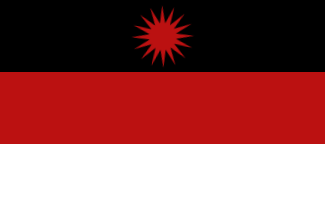
- Flag

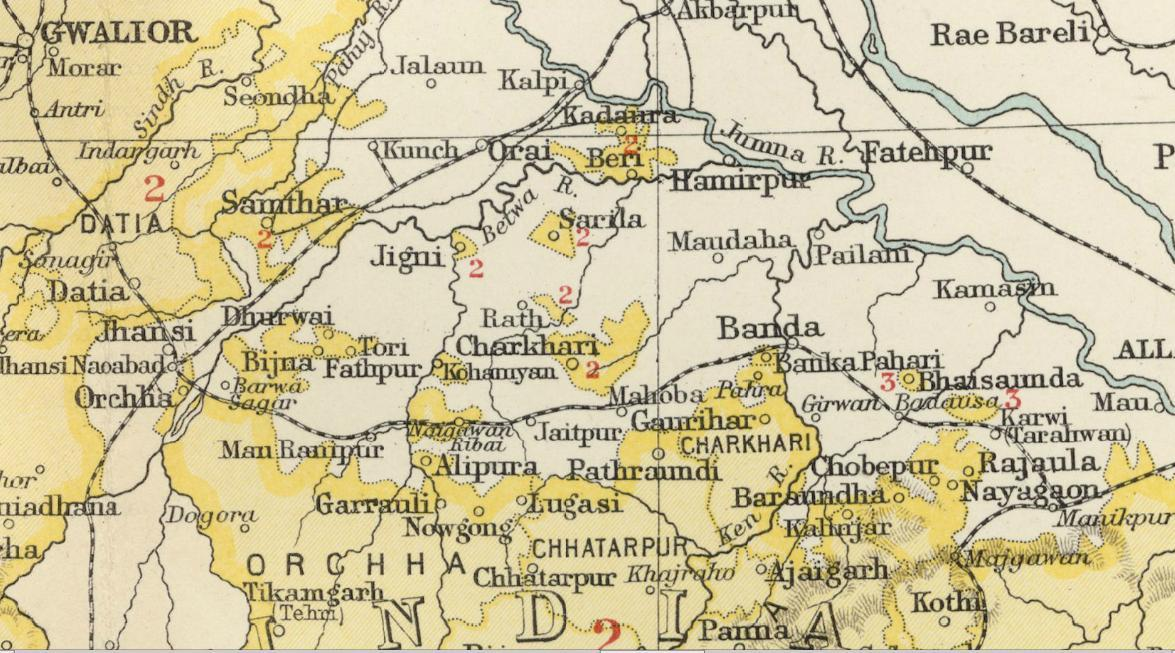
- Dhurwai State in the Imperial Gazetteer of India
- Capital: Dhurwai 25°19′N 79°03′E
- Area
  - 1941: 47 km^{2} (18 sq mi)
- Population
  - 1941: 2,423
- History
  - Established: 1690
  - Independence of India: 1950
Succeeded by
India

Dhurwai was a princely state in India during the British Raj. It was one of the Hasht-Bhaiya Jagirs, under the Bundelkhand Agency of British India. Its capital was the town of Dhurwai, with a population of 777 in 1901. Today it is part of Jhansi District, in the state of Uttar Pradesh. Dhurwai was administered by the native ruler, who was addressed as Indian Prince by the British authorities.

== History ==
Dhurwai State was founded in the Bundelkhand region in 1812 by a descendant of the royal family of Orchha Diwan Rai Singh of Baragaon near Jhansi. He had 8 sons who were granted Jagirs, including Dhurwai, Bijna, and Tori Fatehpur.

The state was located on the eastern part of Jhansi Province, bounded by the British United Provinces of Agra and Oudh on all sides except on the east where it shared a border with the states of Bijna and Tori Fatehpur. In 1823 Diwan Budh Singh was granted a sanad by the British authorities. About a century later the Diwan of Dhurwai was one of the original constituents of the Chamber of Princes, an institution established in 1920. After Indian independence, on 1 January 1950, Dhurwai acceded to the Indian Union and was merged into the Indian state of Vindhya Pradesh with the other Hasht-Bhaiya Jagirs.

== Rulers ==
- Diwan Maan Singh Judeo
- Diwan Jai Singh Judeo
- Maharaja Budh Singh Judeo
- Maharaja Nahar singh judeo
- Maharaja Rajnor singh judeo (B. 1833 - d. 1910)
- Maharaja Jugal Prasad Singh Judeo (b. 1896 - d. 1941)
- Maharaja Keshvendra Singh Judeo (b.1926 - d.2004)
- Maharaja Yadvendra Singh Judeo (b. 1961)

== See also ==
- Bundelkhand Agency
- Political integration of India
