= Hasht-Bhaiya =

Cluster of jagirs (feudal estates) in central British India (1690–1948)

Coordinates: 25°30′N 79°00′E

- Jagir States
- 1690–1948
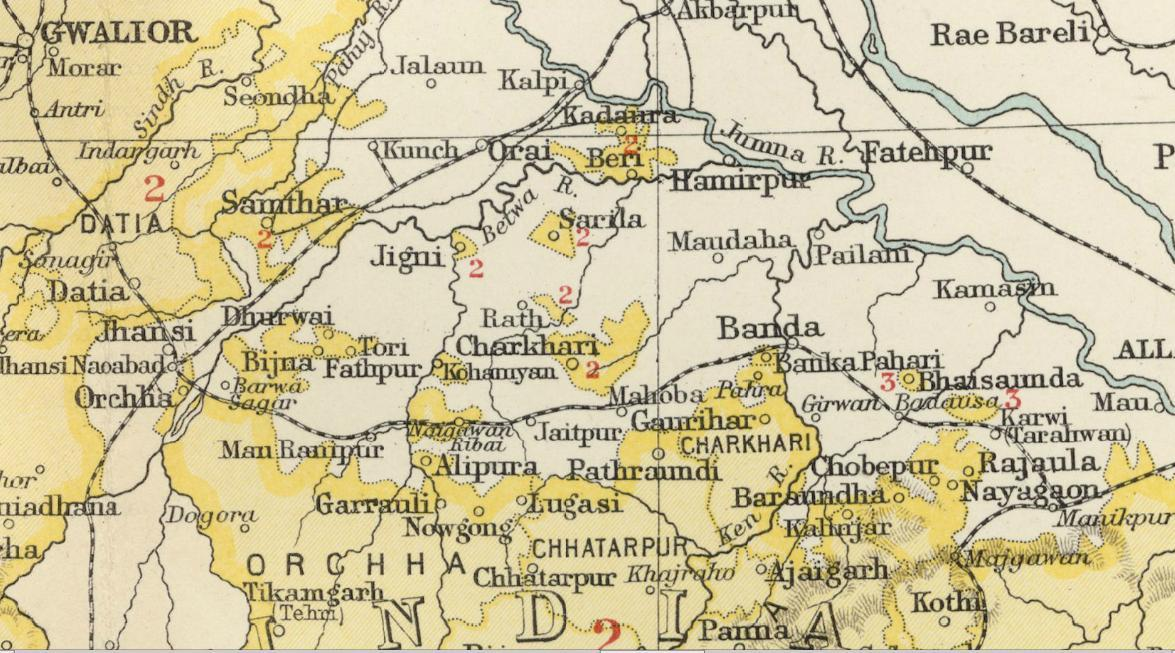
- The area of the Hasht-Bhaiya Jagirs in the Imperial Gazetteer of India
- Area
  - 1901: 223 km^{2} (86 sq mi)
- Population
  - 1901: 11,529
- History
  - Established: 1690
  - Accession to the Union of India: 1948
Succeeded by
India

The Hasht-Bhaiya (Hindi: आठभैया, romanized: ath bhaiya, lit. 'Eight Brothers') (e)states were a group of jagirs (small feudatory estates, formally ranking below a proper princely state) of Central India during the period of the British Raj.

They belonged to the Bundelkhand Agency and all of them had been originally part of the princely state of Orchha. The Hasht-Bhaiya Jagirs were British protectorates between 1823 and 1947. Their last jagirdars (rulers) joined the Indian Union in 1948.

== History ==
=== Early history ===
Towards 1690 Udot Singh, the Maharaja of Orchha, gave to his brother, Diwan Rai Singh, the jagir of Baragaon near Jhansi.

After Rai Singh's death, the jagir went to his sons and it was divided into eight parts (hasht) among the brothers (bhaya) in order to form the following estates:

- Kari (extinct)
- Pasari (extinct)
- Tarauli (extinct)
- Banka-Pahari 13 km^{2}, pop. 1056 in 1901
- Bijna 70 km^{2}, pop. 1578 in 1901
- Chirgaon (annexed by the British in 1841)
- Dhurwai 47 km^{2}, pop. 1826 in 1901
- Tori-Fatehpur 93 km^{2}, pop. 7099 in 1901

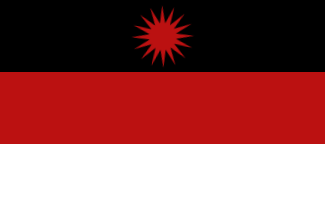
Dhurwai flag. Dhurwai was one of the last Hasht-Bhaiya Jagirs.

Three jagirs were merged into the others, owing to lack of issue, a fourth would later be annexed by the British.

In the 18th century the dismemberment of Orchha State by the Marathas and the formation of Jhansi State brought about disputes regarding the sovereignty and control of the remaining five Hasht-Bhaiya estates.

=== British rule ===
In 1818 the British established their rule and in 1821 a settlement was reached by which the five jagirs would remain under direct dependence of the British Raj. The British decided that the tribute levied by Jhansi should be paid through the Hasht-Bhaiya jagirs and that their rulers would keep and respect the traditional protocol towards the Maharaja of Orchha as head of the ruling families of the jagirs. The jagirdars were granted sanads in 1821 and 1823.

In 1841, following the rebellion of Jagirdar Bakht Singh, the British authorities took possession of Chirgaon jagir, invoking the Doctrine of lapse. After this, only four of the original eight principalities remained.

== See also ==
- Doctrine of lapse
- Vindhya Pradesh
