= Piploda State =

Coordinates: 23°36′N 74°57′E

- Princely State
- 1547–1948
- Area
  - 1901: 155 km^{2} (60 sq mi)
- Population
  - 1901: 11,441
- History
  - Established: 1547
  - Independence of India: 1948
| Succeeded by |
| India |

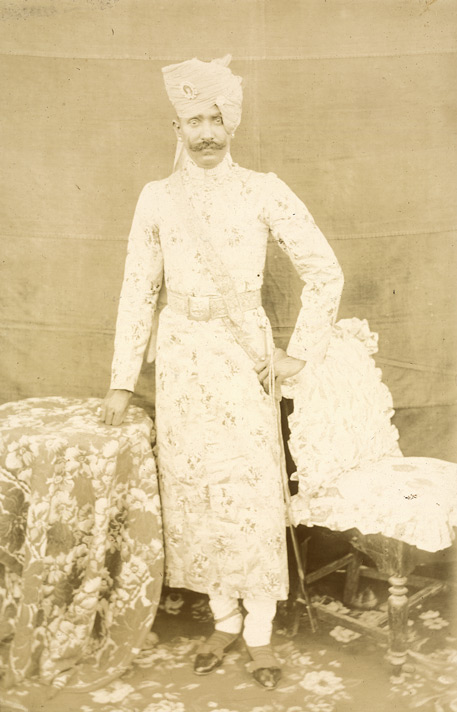
Kesri Singh, ruler of Piploda State from 1888 to 1919

Piploda State was an estate in India at the time of the British Raj. It belonged to the Malwa Agency, part of the Central India Agency. The state was initially a tributary of Jaora State. In 1924 Piploda became an independent non-gun salute state through British mediation.

== History ==
One of the ancestors called Kaluji migrated to Malwa and captured the fort of Sabalgarh in 1285. The Sixth son of Kaluji who was called Shardul Singh extended his domains and founded the village of Piploda. During the rise of the Marathas in Malwa, Piploda was reduced to a great extent and fell under Jaora State during British rule. Piploda became a separate state in 1924 due to the mismanagement of the Jaora nawabs who had a debt of 16 lakhs and couldn't pay back to the British. Piploda state was thus under direct rule of the British empire. The state had 28 villages, a population of 11,441 (1901) and a revenue of Rs.95,000 (1901). The last ruler acceded to the Government of India on 15 June 1948, and Piploda became part of Ratlam District of Madhya Bharat state.

=== Thakurs ===
- .... - .... Sadal Singh
- 1820 - 18.. Prithvi Singh
- 18.. - 18.. Umed Sigh
- 18.. - 12 Nov 1863 Onkar Singh (d. 1863)
- 30 Nov 1863 – 26 Oct 1888 Dulai Singh (b. 1852 - d. 1888)
- 8 Nov 1888 - 4 Nov 1919 Kesri Singh (b. 1872 - d. 1919)
- 5 Nov 1919 - 1936 Mangal Singh (b. 1893 - d. 1936)
- 1936 - 15 Jun 1948 Raghuraj Singh

== See also ==
- List of Rajput dynasties and states
- Malwa Agency
