= Udayan Sharma =

Indian journalist and author (1949–2001)

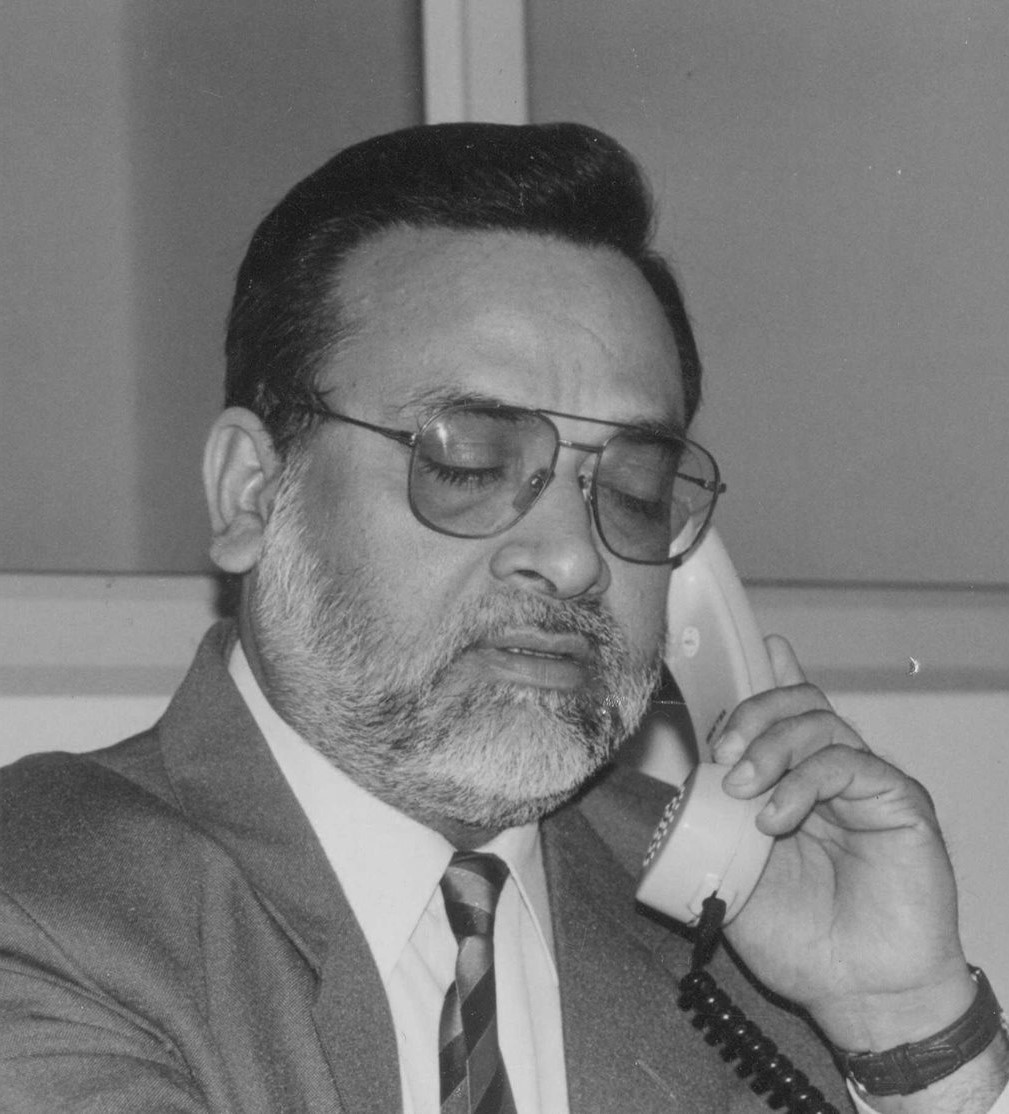
- Born: 11 July 1949; Agra, India
- Died: 21 April 2001 (aged 51); New Delhi, India
- Education: Agra University
- Occupation: Journalist
- Spouse: Neelima Sharma
- Children: 2

Udayan Sharma (11 July 1949 – 23 April 2001) was an Indian author and journalist known for his investigative reporting. He worked for more than a decade in the field, covering topics such as politics, social issues, and business.

== Early life and education ==
Udayan Sharma was born into a family of freedom fighters in Agra. His father, Pandit Sreeram Sharma, was a lawyer, a veteran freedom fighter, and the founder editor of Vishal Bharat. At the time of his birth, both his parents and sisters were in jail. Their ancestral home in Agra was known as Bomb Ghar, and his father's name was closely associated with the Kakori conspiracy. Mahatma Gandhi had visited Udayan's father at the USAINI farms near Firozabad.

He named himself Udayan. He was admitted directly to class 7, completed his entire education in Agra, and pursued his MA from Agra University.

== Personal life ==
Udayan Sharma was married to Neelima Sharma, and they lived together in Noida, Uttar Pradesh. The couple had two sons: Kartikeya and Kanishka Sharma.

== Career ==
Udayan Sharma was not just a journalist but also an activist. Under the guidance of Dr. Dharamvir Bharti, he learned the basics of journalism through Dharamyog. He published 'Ravivar' in 1977. He reported on communal riots, and some of his reports were translated into and published in English.

He unsuccessfully contested two Lok Sabha elections. First time in Lok Dal's ticket from Agra and later on Congress's ticket from Bhind. However, he eventually grew disenchanted with politics (especially after the death of Rajiv Gandhi, with whom he was close) and returned to journalism. In his final years, he was the Coordinating Editor of North India's largest Hindi newspaper group, Amar Ujala. The journalism he began with MJ Akbar and SP Singh in 1977 from Mumbai ended in Delhi in 2001.

== Death ==
Udayan died in Delhi on 23 April 2001. His funeral was held on 24 April 2001, at Nigambodh Ghat, and was attended by former Prime Minister Chandra Shekhar, Former Delhi Chief Minister Sheila Dikshit, and Sushma Swaraj. In accordance with his last wishes, Udayan's family and friends immersed his ashes in the sacred river Ganga.

== Bibliography ==
His life's work included three books and numerous articles.

Some of his compiled articles were published under the below titles:

- Hinsa ka Lawa
- Dahshat
- Phir Padna Ise
- Kissa Kashmir ka
- Janata Party Kaise Tuti
- UDAYAN
- Sampradaiyita
