= Jigni State =

Princely state

Coordinates: 25°45′N 79°25′E

Jigni State जिगनी रियासत
- Princely State of British India
- 1730–1950
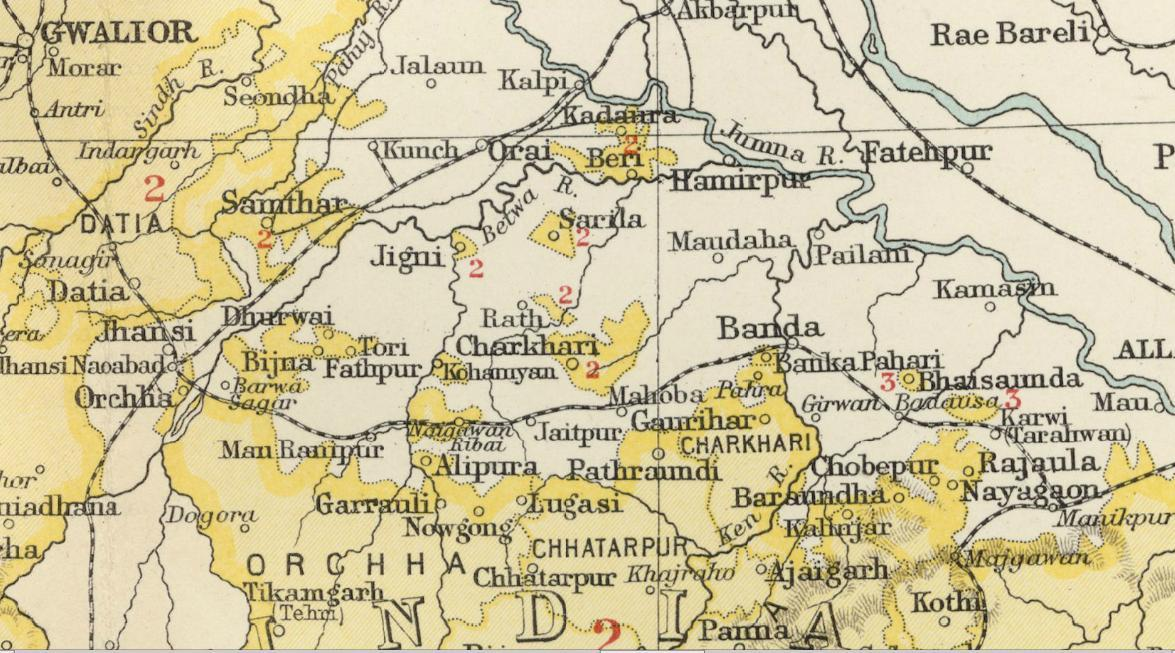
- Jigni State in the Imperial Gazetteer of India
- Area
  - 1901: 57 km^{2} (22 sq mi)
- Population
  - 1901: 3,838
- History
  - Established: 1730
  - Accession to India: 1950
Succeeded by
India
- Today part of: Hamirpur district, Uttar Pradesh, India

Jigni State was a princely state of the Bundelkhand Agency of the British Raj. It was a small Sanad state of about 82.87 km^{2} with a population of 4,297 inhabitants in 1901. The state was surrounded by the Hamirpur and Jhansi districts of the United Provinces.

Its capital was at Jigni, also known as Jigini. It is a small town —1,770 inhabitants in 1901— located near the confluence of the Dhasan and the Betwa River in present-day Rath tehsil of Hamirpur district, Uttar Pradesh.

== History ==
Jigni State was founded as a jagir in 1730 by Rao Padam Singh, a Rajput of the Bundela clan. He was a son of Chhatrasal, the founder of Panna State. Originally the jagir had been larger, but its size was much reduced during the Maratha invasion in the last half of the eighteenth century.

Jigni became a British protectorate in 1810 under the rule of Pirthi Singh. Rao Bhupendra Vijai Singh, the last ruler of Jigni State signed the instrument of accession to India in 1947, the state becoming part of the Indian Union on 1 January 1950.

=== Rulers ===
The ruling family were members of the Bundela clan of Rajputs. The rulers used the title of Rao.

==== Title Rao ====
1730–1790	Padam Singh	(d. 1790)
1790–1806	Lakshman Singh I
1806–1830	Pirthi Singh	(d. 1830)
1830–1870	Bhopal Singh	(b. 1830 – d. 1870)
1870–1892	Lakshman Singh II	(b. 1860 – d. 1892)
1892–1925	Bhanu Pratap Singh	(b. 1878 – d. 1925)
1925–1934	Arimardan Singh	(b. 1903 – d. 1941)
1934 – 15 August 1947	Bhupendra Vijai Singh

== See also ==
- Political integration of India
- Vindhya Pradesh
