= Tori Fatehpur =

Princely state in India (?-1950)

Coordinates: 25°27′N 79°08′E

- Princely Estate (Jagir)
- 1690–1950
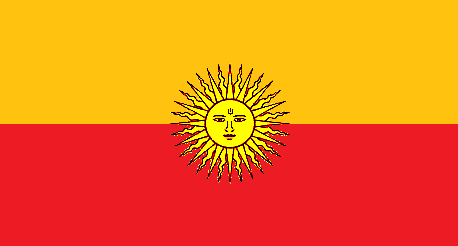
- Flag

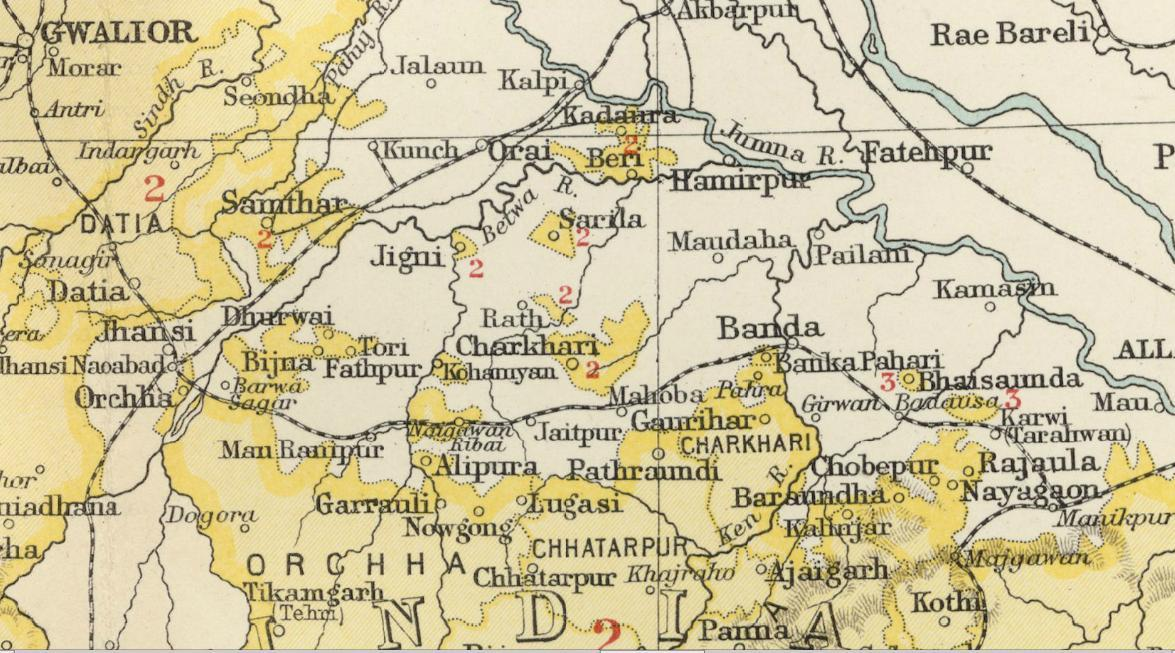
- Tori Fatehpur State in the Imperial Gazetteer of India
- Area
  - 1901: 93 km^{2} (36 sq mi)
- Population
  - 1901: 7,099
- History
  - Established: 1690
  - Independence of India: 1950
Succeeded by
India

Tori Fatehpur (Hindi: टोडी फतेहपुर or टोडी फ़तेहपुर), also known as Tori, was a princely state in India during the British Raj. It was one of the Hasht-Bhaiya Jagirs, under the Bundelkhand Agency of British India. Today it is part of Jhansi District in the state of Uttar Pradesh.

== History ==
Tori Fatehpur State was founded in the Bundelkhand region in 1812 by a descendant of the royal family of Orchha Diwan Rai Singh of Baragaon near Jhansi. He had eight sons who were granted Jagirs, including Dhurwai, Bijna, and Tori Fatehpur.

Tori Fatehpur is on a hill near Gursarai, about 100 km from Jhansi. The fort on the hill is more than 300 years old.

A part royal family started living in a town near Jhansi in the late 1880s after a massive drought and adapted a name "Biswari" for survival. After drought state lost all of its trade and other sources of fortune which resulted in downfall of state.

After Indian independence, on 1 January 1950, Tori Fatehpur acceded to the Republic of India and was merged into the Indian state of Vindhya Pradesh.

== See also ==
- Bundelkhand Agency
- Political integration of India
