= Bijawar State =

Princely state of colonial India

Coordinates: 24.63°N 79.5°E

- Princely State
- 1765–1950
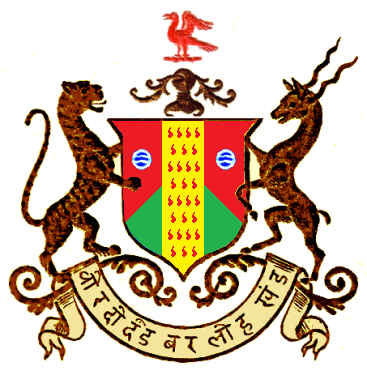
- Coat of arms

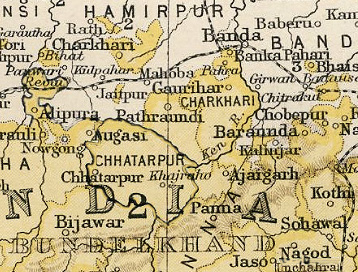
- Bijawar State in the Imperial Gazetteer of India
- Area
  - 1901: 2,520 km^{2} (970 sq mi)
- Population
  - 1901: 110,500
- History
  - Established: 1765
  - Independence of India: 1950
Succeeded by
India
- This article incorporates text from a publication now in the public domain: Chisholm, Hugh, ed. (1911). "Bijawar". Encyclopædia Britannica. Vol. 3 (11th ed.). Cambridge University Press. p. 928.

Bijawar State was a princely state of colonial India, located in modern Chhatarpur district of Madhya Pradesh.

The native state of Bijawar covered an area of 2520 km^{2} (973 sq. m.) in the Bundelkhand Agency. Forests covered nearly half the total area of the state, which was believed to be rich in minerals, but lack of transport facilities had hindered the development of its resources.

== History ==
The state takes its name from the chief town, Bijawar, which was founded by Bijai Singh, one of the Gond chiefs of Garha Mandla, in the 17th century. The first ruler of the state was Bir Singh Deo (1765–93). It was conquered in the 18th century by Chhatarsal, the founder of Panna, by whose descendants it is still held.

Bijawar became a British protectorate on 27 March 1811, and the rule of the territory was confirmed to Ratan Singh in 1811 by the British government for the usual deed of allegiance. In 1857 Bham Pratap Singh rendered signal services to the British during the Revolt of 1857, being rewarded with certain privileges and a hereditary salute of eleven guns. In 1866 he received the title of Maharaja, and the prefix Sawai in 1877. Bhan Pratap was succeeded on his death in 1899 by his adopted son, Sanwant Singh, a son of the Maharaja of Orchha.

The state acceded to India on 1 January 1950, and became part of the state of Vindhya Pradesh, which was merged into Madhya Pradesh on 1 November 1956.

== Rulers ==
The rulers of the state belonged to the Bundela dynasty.

=== Rajas ===
- 1765–1793: Bir Singh Deo
- 1793–1802: Himmat Bahadur (usurper)
- 1802–1810: Keshri Singh
- 1811–1833: Ratan Singh
- 1833–1847: Lakshman Singh
- 1847–1877: Bham Pratap Singh

=== Sawai Maharajas ===
- 1877–1899: Bham Pratap Singh
- 1900–1940: Savant Singh
- 1940–1947: Govind Singh

=== Titular Maharaja ===
- 1947–1983: Govind Singh
- 1983–present: Jai Singh ju dev

== See also ==
- Panna State
- Political integration of India
- Bijawar-Panna Plateau
