= Bhandaria, Bangladesh =

Bhandaria ভাণ্ডারিয়া
- Town
- Nickname: ভাণ্ডারিয়া
- Location in Bangladesh
- Coordinates: 22°29.3′N 90°4.4′E
- Country: Bangladesh
- Division: Barisal Division
- District: Pirojpur District

Area
  - Total: 63.15 sq mi (163.56 km^{2})

Population (1991)
  - Total: 145,233
- Time zone: UTC+6 (Bangladesh Time)

Bhandaria is a small town in Pirojpur District in Barisal Division of southwestern Bangladesh.
