= Bhandaria, Bhavnagar =

Former Princely state

Bhandaria was formerly Princely state ruled by Ahirs.

== History ==
Bhandaria was a small Princely state Ruled by Kamalia Ahirs chieftains.

== Village ==
Modern Bhandaria, in Bhavnagar Taluka of Bhavnagar district, is situated on Maleshri or Maleshvari river.

== Places of interest ==
Bhandaria is known for its stone, a kind of laterite. A very fine bridge of this stone has been built across the Maleshvari river at Bhandaria itself, which is on the high road from Bhavnagar to Mahuva.

The neighbouring hills, a branch of the Khokhara range, are called the Malnath hills, after a temple which lies in one of their gorges, and which is called the Malnath Mahadev. This temple has a fine kund or reservoir of water close to it. The names of the principal hills near Bhandaria are the Kalvira, the Rojmal, the Bhinmal, the Kan-phata, and the Kurma.

== External links and Sources ==
- Imperial Gazetteer on DSAL.UChicago.edu

This article incorporates text from a publication now in the public domain: Gazetteer of the Bombay Presidency: Kathiawar. Vol. VIII. Printed at the Government Central Press, Bombay. 1884. p. 382.
