= Gaurihar State =

Coordinates: 25°17′44″N 80°10′29″E

- Princely State
- 1807–1950
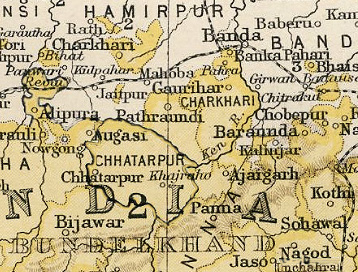
- Gaurihar State in the Imperial Gazetteer of India
- Area
  - 1901: 184 km^{2} (71 sq mi)
- Population
  - 1901: 7,760
- History
  - Established: 1807
  - Accession to the Indian Union: 1950
Succeeded by
India
- Today part of: India
- Malleson, G. B.: An historical sketch of the native states of India, London 1875, Reprint Delhi 1984

Gaurihar State was a princely state in India, ruling a territory that is now in Madhya Pradesh.

== History ==
This family is descended from Raja Ram Tiwari, who was Governor of a fort in the service of Guman Singh, ancestor of the Maharajas of Ajaigarh. During the anarchy of the times, Raja Ram rebelled and for a short while held the fort successfully against Ali Bahadur I Gaurihar was Kanykubj Brahmin of Jhujautiya division Tiwari ruling state. Gaurihar state was founded in 1807 after a split from Ajaigarh State, and Pratap Singh Judev signed the accession to the Indian Union on 1 January 1950. Maharaja Pratap Singh Judev was the last ruler of Gaurihar state.

=== Rulers ===
The rulers bore the title 'Sardar Sawai' and from 1859 the title 'Rao'.

- 1807 – 1846 Raja Ram (d. 1846)
- 1846 – 1877 Rajdhar Rudra Pratap (b. 1811 – d. 18..)
- 1880 – 14 November 1887 Gajadhar Prasad (d. 1887)
- 1888 – 1904 Shamle Prasad (b. 1859 – d. 1904)
- 1904 – 1932 Pratipal (Prithvipal) Singh (b. 1886 – d. 19..)
- 1932 – 1944 Avadhendra Pratap Singh (b. 1902 – d. 19..)
- 1944 – 1959 Pratap Singh Judev (b.1923 d.1959)
- 1959 – 1972 Chandrabhan Singh Judev (b.1925 d. 2012)

== See also ==
- Gourihar
