= Baragaon, Jhansi =

Baragaon
- Town
- Location in Uttar Pradesh, India Baragaon (India)
- Coordinates: 25.4833°N 78.7167°E
- Country: India
- State: Uttar Pradesh
- District: Jhansi
- Elevation: 210 m (690 ft)

Population (2001)
  - Total: 8,039

Languages
  - Official: Hindi
- Time zone: UTC+5:30 (IST)
- PIN: 284121
- Telephone code: 05172750522
- Vehicle registration: UP
- Website: up.gov.in

Baragaon is a town and a nagar panchayat in Jhansi district in the state of Uttar Pradesh, India.

== Geography ==
Baragaon is located at 25.4833°N 78.7167°E. It has an average elevation of 210 metres (692 feet).

== Demographics ==
As of 2001 India census, Baragaon had a population of 8,039. Males constitute 54% of the population and females 46%. Baragaon has an average literacy rate of 62%, higher than the national average of 59.5%; with 65% of the males and 35% of females literate. 16% of the population is under 6 years of age. The newly elected Chairman of Baragaon is Mr Dayaram Kushwaha son of Shri Jagannath kushwaha purv Pradhan since 1 December 2017. He succeed Mr Kalka Prasad Kushwaha.
