= Ajaigarh State =

Former Bundela Rajput Ruled Indian State

Coordinates: 24°54′N 80°16′E

- Vassal state of Maratha Confederacy (1800 - 1809); Princely state of British India
- 1765–1950
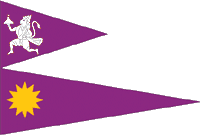
- Flag

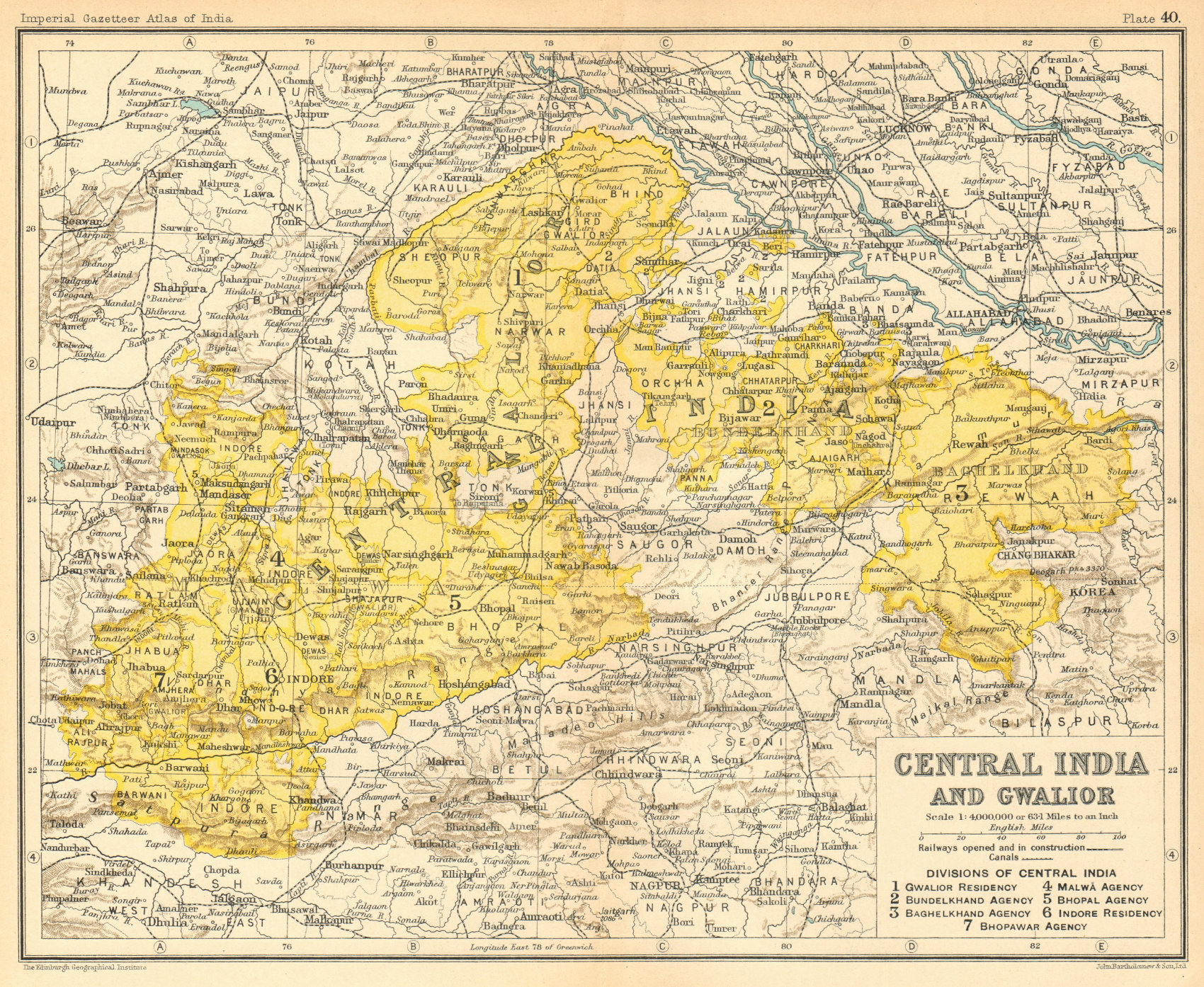
- Ajaigarh State in the Imperial Gazetteer of India
- History
  - Established: 1765
  - Dissolved into India: 1950
Succeeded by
India

Ajaigarh State was a princely state in Bundelkhand, Central India, during the British Raj. It was founded around 1765 CE by Raja Guman Singh, a chieftain of the Bundela Rajput clan and a relative of the ruling family of Panna State. He established the state by fortifying the hilltop settlement of Ajaigarh following the fragmentation of Mughal authority in the region. The rulers of Ajaigarh initially bore the title Raja, which was later elevated to Sawai Maharaja during the British era.

The state was part of the Bundelkhand Agency under the Central India Agency, and acceded to the Union of India in 1948. Ajaigarh is known for the imposing Ajaigarh Fort, which served as the political and military center of the state.

== History of Ajaigarh State ==
Ajaigarh State was a princely state in the Bundelkhand region of Central India, founded in the mid-18th century by Raja Guman Singh, a Bundela Rajput noble from the Orchha royal family. Established around 1765 CE, Ajaigarh emerged during a time of political instability in India following the decline of the Mughal Empire. Taking advantage of the power vacuum, Guman Singh captured a strategic hill in present-day Panna district and fortified it, laying the foundation of the Ajaigarh Fort, which became the capital and symbol of the state.

=== Founding and Early Rule ===
Raja Guman Singh was a skilled warrior and administrator. As a Bundela, he belonged to a Rajput lineage that had earlier founded prominent states such as Orchha and Panna. His rule focused on establishing law and order, consolidating territories, and promoting Hindu religious institutions. Temples, stepwells, and tanks were built or restored under his supervision, and he implemented a traditional administrative framework grounded in Rajput values.

After Guman Singh’s death in 1792, his son Raja Bakht Singh succeeded him. His reign witnessed political turmoil, including a brief deposition. However, in 1807, he was reinstated to the throne with British East India Company support. In 1809, Ajaigarh entered into a treaty of protection with the Company, becoming a princely state under the Bundelkhand Agency of the Central India Agency. This granted the state internal autonomy, while the British handled foreign affairs and military matters.

=== Development and Administration ===
During the 19th century, the rulers of Ajaigarh focused on economic development and social stability. Agriculture was promoted through land reclamation and irrigation, while artisans and craftspeople were encouraged to settle in the state. Traditional crafts such as weaving, stone carving, and metalwork flourished.

Ajaigarh also emerged as a minor cultural hub. Sanskrit education and Bundeli literature were patronized by the court. The fort expanded with the construction of palaces, temples, and granaries. Several inscriptions within the fort date back to the Chandela period, highlighting a historical continuity in the region.

=== Reign of Sawai Maharaja Ranjor Singh ===
One of the most notable rulers was HH Sawai Maharaja Sir Ranjor Singh Sahib Bahadur (reigned 1859–1919). His long reign was marked by administrative reforms and modernization. He introduced tax reforms to benefit peasants, established schools and dispensaries, and built administrative offices. His loyalty to the British Crown during the Indian Rebellion of 1857 earned him the titles of K.C.I.E. (Knight Commander of the Indian Empire) and C.S.I. (Companion of the Star of India).

=== 20th Century and Modernization ===
The early 20th century saw slow but steady modernization. Roads were improved, limited electrification reached the capital area, and administrative procedures were streamlined. Educational awareness increased, and the state maintained a small security force. Royal guesthouses were constructed, and Ajaigarh’s economy benefited from its proximity to key trade routes in Bundelkhand.

HH Sawai Maharajas Bhopal Singh and Punya Pratap Singh continued these efforts, maintaining ceremonial traditions and cooperating with British authorities.

=== Accession to India ===
Following India's independence in 1947, princely states were given the option to accede to the Indian Union. Sawai Maharaja Punya Pratap Singh signed the Instrument of Accession in 1948, integrating Ajaigarh into India. Initially merged with Vindhya Pradesh, the state was later integrated into Madhya Pradesh after the States Reorganisation Act, 1956.

=== Legacy ===
Although princely titles were abolished in 1971 by the Government of India, the royal family of Ajaigarh still retains cultural significance in the region. The current titular head is HH Sawai Maharaja Ajay Raj Singh Sahib Bahadur.

The Ajaigarh Fort remains a prominent heritage site, symbolizing the administrative history and cultural legacy of the once-thriving Bundela state.

== See also ==
- Ajaigarh Fort
- Bundelkhand Agency
- Panna State
- Orchha State
- Bundela Rajputs

== List of Rulers ==
The rulers of Ajaigarh belonged to the Bundela Rajput dynasty:

- Maharaja Chhatrasal (1675-1731)
- Raja Guman Singh (1765–1792) - Founder Ruler of the state
- Raja Bakht Singh (1792–1793) - Removed by Nawab Ali Bahadur I
- Nawab Ali Bahadur I (1793-1802)
- Nawab Shamsher Bahadur II (1802-1804)
- Raja Bakht Singh (2nd region)(1807-1837)
- Raja Madho Singh (1837–1849)
- Raja Mahipat Singh (1849–1853)
- Raja Vijay Singh (1853–1855)
- HH Sawai Maharaja Sir Ranjor Singh Sahib Bahadur, K.C.I.E., C.S.I. (1859–1919)
- HH Sawai Maharaja Bhopal Singh Sahib Bahadur (1919–1942)
- HH Sawai Maharaja Punya Pratap Singh Sahib Bahadur (1942–1958)
- HH Sawai Maharaja Devendra Vijaya Singh Sahib Bahadur (1958–1984)
- HH Sawai Maharaja Ajay Raj Singh Sahib Bahadur (1984–present, titular)

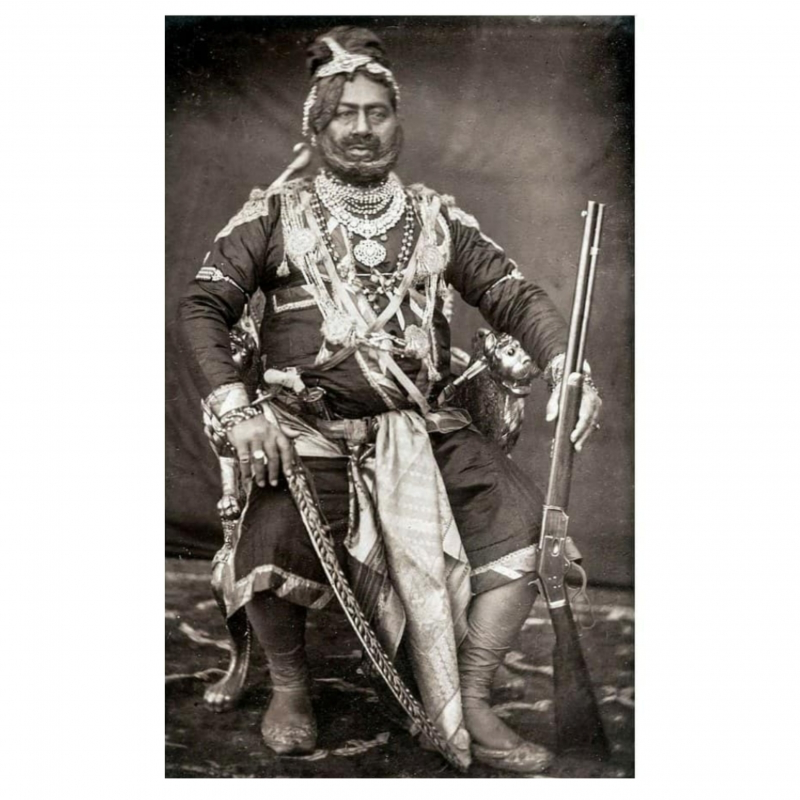
Photo of Ranjore Singh
