= Flags of Indian princely states =

This is a list of flags used by Princely states during British rule in India:

== Baluchistan ==
Flag	Duration	Use	Description
		Flag of the Khanate of Kalat	
		Flag of the State of Kharan	
		Flag of the State of Las Bela	
		Flag of the State of Makran	

== Central Provinces and Central India States ==
Flag	Duration	Use	Description
		Flag of the Ajaigarh State	
		Flag of the Alirajpur State	
		Flag of Chhatarpur State	A horizontal blue-white bicolour flag.
		Flag of Barwani State	
		Flag of the Bhaisunda State	
		Flag of the Bhopal State	A horizontal black-white-green tricolour flag.
		Flag of Dewas State (Senior Branch)	A red flag featuring Hindu god Hanuman.
		Flag of Dewas State (Junior Branch)	A red non-rectangular flag featuring Hindu god Hanuman.
		Flag of the Dhar State	
		Flag of the Gwalior State	
	1818–1950	Flag of Indore State	
	1732–1818	Flag of Indore State	
	1895–1947	Flag of the Jaora State	
	c.1865–1895	Flag of the Jaora State	
		Flag of Jhabua State	
		Flag of Khilchipur State	
		Flag of the Kurwai State	A horizontal green-black-yellow tricolour flag.
		Flag of the Nagod State	
		Flag of the Narsinghgarh State	
		Flag of the Orchha State	
		Flag of the Panna State	
		Flag of the Rajgarh State	
		Flag of the Ratlam State	
	?-1947	Flag of the Rewa State	
	19th century	Flag of the Rewa State	
		Flag of the Sitamau State	
		Flag of the Sohawal State	

== Deccan States ==
Flag	Duration	Use	Description
		Flag of the Akkalkot State	A red field.
		Flag of the Aundh State	A brownish field.
		Flag of the Bhor State	
		Flag of the Janjira State	
		Flag of the Jath State	
		Flag of the Jawhar State	
		Flag of the Kapshi Jagir	
		Flag of the Kolhapur State	
		Flag of the Kurundvad Junior	An orange field
		Flag of the Kurundvad Senior	A red field.
		Flag of the Nagpur kingdom	
		Flag of the Phaltan State	A horizontal orange-green bicolour.
		Flag of the Sangli State	
		Flag of the Surgana State	
		Flag of Jamkhandi State	A brown field with the coat of arms of the Jamkhandi State in the centre.
		Flag of the Mudhol State	
		Flag of the Ramdurg State	
		Flag of Sandur State	

== Eastern States ==
Flag	Duration	Use	Description
		Flag of Kharsawan State	
		Flag of Saraikela State	
		Flag of Bastar state	The flag of the Principality of Bastar is of two vertical parts, blue and white. On the dividing line the trident of Shiva is placed in the inverted colors. In the canton there is a crescent moon facing the fly.
		Flag of Chhuikhadan State	A plain purple flag in the shape of a right-angled triangle.
		Flag of Jashpur State	
		Flag of Kanker State	An orange flag featuring Hindu god Hanuman as well as a crescent.
		Flag of Kawardha State	
		Flag of Khairagarh State	
		Flag of Koriya State	
		Flag of Nandgaon State	
		Flag of Raigarh State	
		Flag of Sarangarh State	
		Flag of Surguja State	
		Flag of Udaipur State	
	1891–1907	Flag of the Kingdom of Manipur	
		Flag of the Baramba State	
		Flag of the Baudh State	
		Flag of Daspalla State	
		Flag of the Dhenkanal State	
		Flag of the Kingdom of Jeypore	
		Flag of Kalahandi State	
		Flag of the Keonjhar State	
		Flag of the Khandpara State	
		Flag of Mayurbhanj State	
		Flag of the Pal Lahara State	
		Flag of the Paralakhemundi Estate	
		Flag of the Talcher State	
		Flag of Cooch Behar State	
		Flag of Twipra Kingdom	unofficial flag

== Gujarat ==
Flag	Duration	Use	Description
		Flag of Ambliara State	
		Flag of Balasinor State	
		Flag of Bansda State	A horizontal red-yellow bicolour flag.
		Flag of Bantva Manavadar	
		Flag of Baria State	
	?-1874	Flag of Baroda State	
	1874–1936	Flag of Baroda State	
	1936–1949	Flag of Baroda State	
	?-1947	Flag of Bhavnagar State	
	?-1947	Flag of Cambay State	
		Flag of Chhota Udaipur State	
		Flag of Cutch State	
		Flag of Danta State	
		Flag of Dharampur State	
		Flag of Dhrangadhra State	
		Flag of Dhrol State	
		Flag of Idar State	
		Flag of Jambughoda State	
		Flag of Jasdan State	
	1948	Flag of Junagadh State	
		Flag of Lunavada State	
		Flag of Malpur State	
		Flag of Makaji Meghpar	
		Flag of Makaji Meghpar	
		Flag of Mansa State	
		Flag of Mohanpur State	
		Flag of Morvi State	
		Flag of Nawanagar State	
		Flag of Palanpur State	A horizontal green-yellow-red tricolour flag.
	?–1948	Flag of the Kingdom of Porbandar	A yellow-orange flag with a purple border with the draw of a red swallowtailed flag inside.
		Flag of Rajkot State	
		Flag of Rajpipla State	
		Flag of Rajpara State	
		Flag of Ranasan State	
		Flag of Sachin State	
		Flag of Sant State	
		Flag of Surat State	
		Flag of Vala State	
		Flag of Vav State	
		Flag of Vijaynagar State	
		Flag of Wadagam State	
		Flag of Wadhwan State	
		Flag of Wankaner State	

== Punjab States ==
Flag	Duration	Use	Description
	1803–1947	Flag of Loharu State	Green-yellow bicolour.
	1804–1948	Flag of Pataudi State	
		Flag of Chamba State	
		Flag of Dhami State	An orange field with a green canton.
		Flag of Bilaspur State	
		Flag of Kangra State	
		Flag of Kumarsain State	
		Flag of Kutlehar State	
		Flag of Mandi State	
		Flag of Suket State	
	1799–1849	Flag of the Sikh Empire (Nishan Sahib)	
	1799–1849	Flag of the Sikh Empire	
	1716–1799	Flag of The Sikh Confederacy	
		Flag of the Faridkot State	
		Flag of the Kapurthala State	
		Flag of Nabha State	
		Flag of the Patiala State	

== Jammu and Kashmir ==
Flag	Duration	Use	Description
	1846–1936	Flag of Jammu and Kashmir	
	1936–1953	Flag of Jammu and Kashmir	

== Madras States ==
Flag	Duration	Use	Description
	1700–1819	Flag of the Arakkal Kingdom	A white banner with a border of 22 red triangles.
	1545–1700	Flag of the Arakkal Kingdom	A red banner with a crescent and star.
	1799–1949	Flag of Kingdom of Cochin	
	1729–1949	Flag of the Kingdom of Travancore	Red flag with a dextrally-coiled silver conch shell (Turbinella pyrum) at its centre.
		Flag of Banganapalle State	
		Flag of the Pudukkottai state	A green field depicting a lion standing on rocks while holding a flag depicting Hanuman.

== Mysore ==
Flag	Duration	Use	Description
	1799–1950	Flag of the Kingdom of Mysore	Red and Brown coloured flag of the Kingdom of Mysore which ruled over most of Karnataka and at its zenith most of South India.

== Rajputana ==
Flag	Duration	Use	Description
	1775–1931	Flag of the Alwar State	
	1931–1948	Flag of the Alwar State	
	1880–1943	Flag of Bharatpur State	
	1943–1947	Flag of Bharatpur State	
		Flag of the Bikaner State	A horizontal red-orange bicolour flag.
		Flag of the Banswara State	
		Flag of Bundi State	A yellow field.
		Flag of the Dholpur State	A horizontal blue-yellow bicolour flag.
		Flag of the Jodhpur State	
		Flag of the Gaurati State	
		Flag of the Mewar State	
		Flag of the Dungarpur State	
	1877–1922	Flag of Jaipur State	
	1922–1946	Flag of Jaipur State	
	1699–1818	Flag of Jaipur State	
		Flag of the Jaisalmer State	
		Flag of the Jhalawar State	
		Flag of Jiliya Kingdom	
		Flag of the Karauli State	
		Flag of the Kishangarh State	A horizontal black-white-red tricolour flag. Not be confused with the flag of the German Empire.
		Flag of the Kota State	
		Flag of the Pratapgarh State	
		Flag of the Shahpura State	
		Flag of the Tonk State	
		Flag of the Sirohi State	

== Hyderabad ==
Flag	Duration	Use	Description
	1947–1948	Flag of The Hyderabad State	An orange flag with 6 black stripes and 4 white stripes. The script along the top reads Al Azmatulillah meaning "All greatness is for God". The bottom script reads Ya Uthman which translates to "Oh Osman". The writing in the middle reads "Nizam-ul-Mulk Asif Jah".
	1900–1947	Flag of The Hyderabad State	2 striped green and red flag with a white crescent and star
	1700–1900	Flag of The Hyderabad State	An orange triangular flag with a green crescent.

== United Provinces ==
Flag	Duration	Use	Description
		Flag of Garhwal Kingdom	A horizontal white-green bicolour flag.
		Flag of Kumaon Kingdom	
		Flag of Baoni State	A horizontal green-yellow-green tricolour flag.
		Flag of Benares State	
		Flag of Beri State	A horizontal red-yellow bicolour flag.
		Flag of Charkhari State	
		Flag of Dhurwai State	
		Flag of Rampur State	
		Flag of Sailana State	A plain red flag in the shape of a right-angled triangle.
		Flag of Tori Fatehpur	

== See also ==
- Flag of India
- List of Indian flags
- List of princely states of British India (alphabetical)
- List of princely states of British India (by region)
