= History of Idar =

Idar is a town in Sabarkantha district located in northern Gujarat, India. Recorded in epic history, this town was ruled by the Bhil tribe and descendants of Maitraka of Vallabhi, with its history traced back to the 7th century. The region was ruled by Rajput clans. Initially, Parihar Rajput refounded Idar and ruled until its chief died in the Second Battle of Tarain in 1192. It was then ruled by a Koli chieftain named Hathi Sora, who was succeeded by his son Samalio. The Rathod clan's prince, Sonangji, defeated the former ruler and assumed control, establishing the Rao dynasty that would govern the region for numerous generations. After numerous changes of fortune and many struggles with the Muslim rulers of Gujarat, the Rao rulers left Idar. In 1728, they were succeeded by the Rathod dynasty from Marwar. They ruled Idar State for generations and became part of the Mahi Kantha agency under British rulers. Following the independence of India in 1947, Idar became part of the Union of India and later the Republic of India.

== Legends ==
Idar is first known in tradition as Ilvadurg, the residence in the Dvapara Yuga, or third age according to many myths of Hinduism, of Elvan the Rakshasa, and his brother Vatapi. These demons who harassed and laid waste to the surrounding country were at last destroyed by the seer Agastya. The town is mentioned in Mahabharata and Bhavishottar Puran as 'Ilvadurg'. In the Kali Yuga, or present age, when Yudhishthira was ruling over Hastinapur at the end of the Kurukshetra War of Mahabharata, Veni Vachh Raj ruled in Idar. He owned a magic gold figure which gave him money for building the Idar fortress and reservoirs. Veni Vachh Raj's queen was a Nagputri, the daughter of one of the Snake Kings of the under world. After a period of contented coexistence, while seated in an oriental window in Idargadh, a funeral procession passed by, with mourners in tow. Inquiring about the nature of the procession, the Rani was informed that one of the individuals had died, prompting her to remark, "Let us depart from a place where lives are lost." Subsequently, both the Rani and the king journeyed to the hill of Taran Mata. They ventured into a crevice in the rock, near the present-day site of goddess worship, disappearing from sight forever. Then the land lay desolate for many years.

== Early history ==
The first clear tradition shows Idar in the possession of Bhils. When Vallabhi fell in 770, Pushpavati or Kamalavati, one of the queens of Maitraka king Shiladitya, was at the Arasur shrine of Amba Bhavani at Ambaji, fulfilling a vow, for the goddess had heard her prayer and she was with child. On her way back Pushpavati heard that Vallabhi had fallen and that she was a widow. Taking refuge in a mountain cave, she gave birth to a son, whom she named Gruhaditya or 'Goha', the Cave-born. Leaving the baby in the charge of a Brahman woman, and telling her to bring him up as one of her own sons but to marry him to a Rajput's daughter, she committed Sati by mounting the funeral pile. Idar was then in the hands of the Bhils, and the young Goha, leaving his Brahman mother, took to the woods with the Bhils, and, by his daring, won their hearts. One day the Bhils in sport choosing a king, the choice fell on Goha, and one 'of the children of the forest' cutting his finger rubbed the blood on Goha's forehead as the sovereign mark, tilak. Thus Goha, the son of Shiladitya, became lord of the forests and mountains of Idar. His descendants are said to have ruled for seven generations, till the Bhils tired of strangers, attacked and slew Nagaditya or Aparajita, the eighth prince of the line. His infant son Bappa Rawal, then only three years old, was saved to become, twelve years later (974), the founder of the Mewar dynasty. Then the city fell into ruins.

The Chinese pilgrim Xuanzang (640) mentions a place which he calls O-clia-li, the Chinese way of writing Vadali, a village nearby. British General Cunningham identified this place with Idar. He further noted that in the eleventh century Vadali or Vadari was the capital of a family of chiefs claiming descent from Raja Bhara Gupta, whom the General believed to be the same as the above-mentioned Bappa.

=== Parihar Rajput rule ===
Some time after, a band of Parihar Rajputs, from Mandovar in Marwar, binding the garland upon its gates, refounded Idar, and ruled there for several generations. In the time of one of these Parihar rulers, Amarsingh by name, the Raja of Kanauj, performing a sacrifice in honour of his daughter's marriage, sent letters of invitation to the neighbouring kings. Idar was then subject to Chittor, and Samarsinh Rawal of Chitor, invited by his brother-in-law Prithviraj to accompany him to the marriage, summoned his vassal Amarsingh to attend him. The Parihar chieftain, with his son and a body of five thousand horse, went to Chittor, and took part with Prithviraj Chauhan, king of Delhi, against the Ghurid Sultanate and was killed in the Battles of Tarain (1192). When the news reached Idar, many of the queens cast themselves from the steep cliff to the north of the town, still known as the 'Ranis' Leap' or 'Murder Hill'. Idar then fell into the hands of a Koli named Hathi Sora who was succeeded by his son Samalio.

== Rao rule (1257–1300) ==
Driven south by the Muslims, the Rathores, about the end of the twelfth century, under the guidance of Siyoji, the grandson of Jaychand of Kanauj, established themselves in the sandy deserts of Marwar. Siyoji's second son, Sonangji captured idar, repaired the court of Anhilwad Patan, whose sovereign, probably Bhim Dev II (1177-1215) of Chaulukya dynasty, assigned him the fief of Sametra in the district of Kadi. And not many years after the Rathods won for themselves the fort aud lands of Idar in 1257. The local story of this conquest is, that Samalio Sora by his tyranny roused his subjects' discontent. His chief adviser, a Nagar Brahmin, had a beautiful daughter, whom Samalio demanded in marriage. The father, not daring to refuse, begged half a year's delay. This was granted, and in the interval he paid a visit to Sametra, and after introducing himself to Sonangji, asked him if he was bold enough to take Idar. Sonangji agreed to try, and the Brahmin, returning home, declared that he was making preparations for the marriage and was assembling his relations. By twos and threes a hundred carriages, supposed to contain Brahmin women, brought to the minister's mansion the Rathod warriors and their leader. The minister at length gave out that all was ready, and asked Samalio and his relations to the feast. After the arrival of the bridegroom and his party, intoxicating drugs and liquor were freely served, and, on the minister's ordering his servants to bring the second course, the Rajputs rushed forward and surrounded the banquet hall. Samalio strove to cut his way through his enemies and regain the fortress, but, within a short distance of the gate of Idargadh, fell mortally wounded. When Sonangji came to the spot where he lay dying, Samalio, raising himself for the last time, made the royal mark on the victorious Rathod's brow, and with his dying breath begged that each Rathod Rao on mounting the royal cushion should be marked with the tilak by a Sora, who should draw the blood from his own right hand, and say 'May the kingdom of Samalio Sora flourish.' Spots on the ascent to Idargad, still pointed to as Samalio's blood stains, are marked by the Hindus with vermilion on Kali Chaudas and other days on which Hanuman is worshipped. After sonanji his son Rao emalji sat on the throne but died early, his descendants started a new lineage called Emaliya raos, given jagir of ahmednagar and vizapur Later, while his brother dhawalmalji sat on the throne after emlaji, Descendant of Sonangji when took charge of the lands of his ancestors in their last retreat at Polo, a Koli of Sarvan marked his forehead with blood in token of his unsurrendered title to Samalio's domains. For the next four generations the Idar territories remained unchanged. Then Ranmal, the fifth in descent from Sonangji, took from a Yadav family the country called the Bhagar between Idar and Mewar.

== Rao during Muslim rule (1300–1731) ==
=== During Delhi Sultanate ===
During this time Muslim power had spread over Gujarat, and Idar had been forced to acknowledge its supremacy. According to one account Muzaffar, one of Alauddin Khalji's general took Idar, and it seems probable that Idar was unable to avoid sharing in the general submission enforced by Alph Khan in the early years of the fourteenth century (1300–1317). Muhammad bin Tughluq, about forty years later, on entering Gujarat to quell a revolt, first turned his arms against the chiefs of the northeast frontier, and Idar was probably included in the settlement of the province, a work on which he spent the next three years (1347 - 1350). Under the weaker rulers that followed Tughluq, Idar would seem to have been left unmolested.

=== During Gujarat Sultanate ===
Near the close of the 13th century, Zafar Khan, later known as Muzaffar Shah I, founded Gujarat Sultanate. In 1393, the Idar chief refused to pay his tribute. The governor invaded his fort, and after a long siege, forciedthe garrison to surrender and extorted a large payment of money and jewels. Five years later (1398) Zafar Khan, determining to reduce Idar, besieged the fort and laid the country waste. While the garrison held out, news came of Timur's victory against Tughlaq dynasty of Delhi, and concluding a peace with Ranmal, Zafar Khan returned to Anhilwad Patan (1401). After three years, according to one account, he again marched to levy the tribute of Idar when the chief fled to Visalnagar leaving Zafar Khan to occupy his capital. If this account is correct the Idar chief must soon after have been restored, for, in the revolt that followed tho death of Muzaffar Shah (1411), two of the rebels, Moiduddin Firoz Khan the cousin, and Masti Khan the uncle of Sultan Ahmed Shah I who founded Ahmedabad, were aided by Ranmal the Idar chief, and took refuge in his fortress. Ahmad Shah I sending troops against the rebels forced them to flee to Nagor, and Rao Ranmal despairing of success made peace with the king by surrendering his horses, elephants, and other war materials (1414). About thirteen years later (1426), Ahmed Shah I again marched against Idar, defeated the force brought to meet him, and drove Rao Punja, the successor of Ranmal, to the hills. Idar was difficult to subdue, for, when his country was threatened, the chief could retire to his hills where he could not easily be followed. As a permanent check on his movements Ahmed Shah I, in 1427, built the fort of Ahmednagar, later known as Himmatnagar, on the banks of the Hathmati River. In the following year, on 29 February 1428, during a frontier foray, Rao Punja, repulsed and pursued by the Muslim cavalry, gallopped towards Idar, and, as he passed along a path at the edge of a ravine, his horse shied, and, falling into the chasm below, killed his rider. After Rao Punja's death, Ahmed Shah I marched on Idar and did not return till Punja's son Narandas had agreed to pay a yearly tribute of £300 (Rs. 3000). Next year Narandas failing to pay his tribute, Ahmed Shah again marched to Idar, and, on 14 November, stormed one of the chief forts in the province, probably Idargadh, and built in it a magnificent mosque.

In 1445 Muhammad Shah II, the son and successor of Ahmed Shah, marched against Rao Bhan, the brother and successor of Narandas, who by the Muslims is called Bir or Vir Rai. The Rao appears to have remained quiet during the reign of Mahmud Begada, as, from 1459 to 1513 no mention is made of any expedition against him. Rao Bhan left two sons, Surajmal and Bhim. Surajmal ruled for only eighteen months, leaving a son Raimalji, whose place was, in his minority, usurped by his uncle Bhim. In 1514 Rao Bhim defeated Ain-ul-mulk, governor of Patan, who on his way to Ahmedabad had turned aside to attack the Rao. Advancing with a great army he found Idar abandoned, and destroyed it. At this time Muzaffar Shah II was anxious to advance into Malwa, and, on receiving a large sum of money, made peace with the Rao. Rao Bhim, on his death, was succeeded by his son Bharmal, who soon after was deposed by Rana Sanga of Chittor, whose daughter was married to Raimal the son of Surajmal. In 1515 Bharmal sought the aid of Sultan Muzaffar, and he sending Nizam-ul-mulk, one of his chief officers, replaced Bharmal as ruler of Idar. Raimal did not despair, and two years after again appearing in Idar, defeated a Muhammadan officer Zehr-ul-mulk, the Jher Khan of Hindu tradition. Soon after this Raimal died, and Bharmal became the undisputed chief. But his capital remained in the hands of the Muslims. In 1519 in the presence of Mubariz-ul-mulk, governor of Idar, someone praised the bravery of Rana Sanga of Chittor. Mubariz, to show his contempt, ordered a dog to be tied to the gate of the Idar fort, and to be called Rana Sanga. Hearing of this insult, Rana Sanga marched against Idar. Mubariz having only 900 men retired to Ahmednagar, and Sanga taking Idar and marching against Ahmednagar defeated Mubariz and plundered the town. In the next year (December 1520) Sultan Muzaffar marched on Idar and again took it. During the Muslim occupation of their capital, the Raos are said to have lived at Sarvan, the village held by the descendants of Samalio Sora, formerly in Idar and later in Mewar. The Muslims do not seem to have held Idar for any length of time. Rao Bharmal again occupied his capital and was twice attacked by Bahadur Shah of Gujarat Sultanate in 1528 and in 1530. The second expedition seems to have reduced Rao Bharmal to obedience, as mention is made that in 1530 Bahadur led an army into Bayad and the kings of Idar and Dungarpur were present and served in his camp. Dying in 1543, Bharmal was succeeded by Punjaji. During Punjaji's time the power of the Gujarat Sultanate greatly declined, and, as he is never mentioned, the Idar chief probably left in almost complete independence. Afterwards in the reigns of the last Gujarat Sultanate kings (1540-1572), the Rao of Idar was freed from the demand of tribute on agreeing to serve with 2000 horse. Punjaji was succeeded by his son Narandas, a great ascetic, who lived only on grain that had first been eaten by cows.

=== During Mughal Empire ===
Later Ahmedabad fell to Mughal Empire. In 1573, Narandas took part in the revolt against Khan Aziz Koka, the Mughal governor of Gujarat. This revolt was checked by Akbar in person, and, in 1575 and again in 1576, expeditions were sent against Idar. In the last of these the Rao fled, and Idar fell into the Akbar's hands. Following his usual policy, Akbar, asking for no more than an admission of his supremacy, restored the Rao to his state and made him a commander of 2000 infantry and 500 cavalry. Rao Narandas was succeeded by Viramdev, a favourite hero with the bards. Viramdev left no son, and, in supersession of his elder brother Gopaldas, was succeeded by his brother Kalianmal. Going to Delhi, Gopaldas took service with the Emperor in the hope of being helped to regain Idar. At length, advancing at the head of an array, he took possession of Mandva, planning from there an advance on Idar. While at Mandva, Lai Mia, the Muslim landlord of that place, fell on him, and Gopaldas, with fifty-two Rajputs, was slain.

When he went to Delhi, Gopaldas left his family at the hamlet of a cowherd named Valo. On growing up Gopaldas' sons made the hamlet their headquarters, calling it Valasna after the cowherd, and gradually encroached on the country round till their lands included the estates of great and little Valasna. At the same time Kalianmal, the ruler of Idar, conquered from Mewar the districts of Panavda, Pahari, Javas, Jora, Pathia, Valecha and others that had been brought under Mewar in the reign of Viramdev. Kalianmal was succeeded by his son Rao Jagannath. During Kalianmal's rule two political parties had been formed, one including the proprietors of Vasai, Mondeti, and Kariadaru supported by tho chiefs of Poshina and Derol; and the other including Garibdas, the Rehvar Thakor of Ranasan, the chief Muslim Kasbatis of Idar, and Motichand Shah, proprietor of Vadali. In these times (about 1650) the Mughal governors of Gujarat began to levy the Idar tribute more regularly than before, and Vetal Bharot of Baroda was the Emperor's security for the Idar chiefs. This security became in time his creditor for so large an amount that the determined to get rid of him, and bringing a charge of fornication against him, drove him out of Idar. Upon this Vetal going to Delhi sought tho Emperor's help, promising to bring Idar into his hands. The Emperor ordered Murad Baksh, then Viceroy of Ahmedabad, (1654–1657), to help Vetal with 5000 horse. The Rao's agent at the court of Delhi sent word of the threatened danger. But on Vetal's assurance that the rumour was false, the Rao made no preparation. Soon after, Murad Baksh appeared, and, the Rao retiring to Pol, Idar was taken without a blow (1656). Placing a Muslim officer Syed Hatho in command, Prince Murad continued the Idar ministers in the management of affairs. Soon after, in his retreat at Pol, Rao Jagannath died.

His son Punja, then a minor, went to Delhi to receive investiture, but failing by the rivalry of the Jaipur king, fled in disguise and joined his mother at Udaipur. Helped by the Rana of Udaipur, Rao Punja, in 1658, won back Idar, where he lived, placing his Ranis and treasure at Sarvan. Poisoned after ruling for about six months, he was succeeded by his brother Arjundas, who while attacking Kanasan was slain by the Rehvars. On Arjundas' death, Rao Jagannath's brother Gopinath began plundering as far as Ahmedabad, and was bought off by Syed Hatho, the Muslim governor, by money payments. Pol Raos still levied from Idar. Syed Hatho was replaced by Kamal Khan, an indolent man whom Rao Gopinath drove out, and, regaining Idar, held it for five years (1664). Garibdas Rehvar, who was at the head of a party in Idar, fearing that Gopinath would take vengeance for Arjundas, brought an army from Ahmedabad to drive him out. The Rao fled to the hills and died for want of opium of which he was accustomed to take a pound and a quarter a day. The affairs of Idar now fell into the hands of Motichand Shah, proprietor of Vadali, and the proprietor of Vasai, Garibdas being the chief minister. In 1679 Karansingh, Gopinath's son, drove out tho Muslim garrison from Idar and regained possession of his capital. Shortly after, Muhammad Amin Khan and Muhammad Bahlol Khan retook Idar, the chief flying to Sarvan where he stayed till his death.

Karansingh had two sons, Chandaji or Chandrasing, and Madhavsing. Madhavsing took possession of Verabar, which his descendants held it until independence of India. For several years Idar remained in the hands of a Muslim garrison commanded by Muhammad Bahlol Khan. In 1696 Chandrasing began to make raids on the Idar territory, and in 1718 the proprietors of Vasai having driven out the Muslim garrison, brought him back to Idar. His soldiers getting clamorous for their pay he gave Sardarsingh of Valasna as security, and entrusting tho government to him retired from idar's throne and established himself in pol gave his son the throne of pol and left for kashi wirh his wife, on the way he went to his cousin to Chandana Jagir in sirohi state and died there and feudal lord of chandana named the village after him . Chandaji is ancestor of the present ruling family of Pol also called as raos of pol later established vijaynagar state. At Idar, after for a time ruling in Chandrasingh's name, Sardarsingh was raised to the chief ship; but afterwards quarrelling with the Kasbatis he had to retire to Valasna.

== Marwar dynasty rule (1731–1948) ==
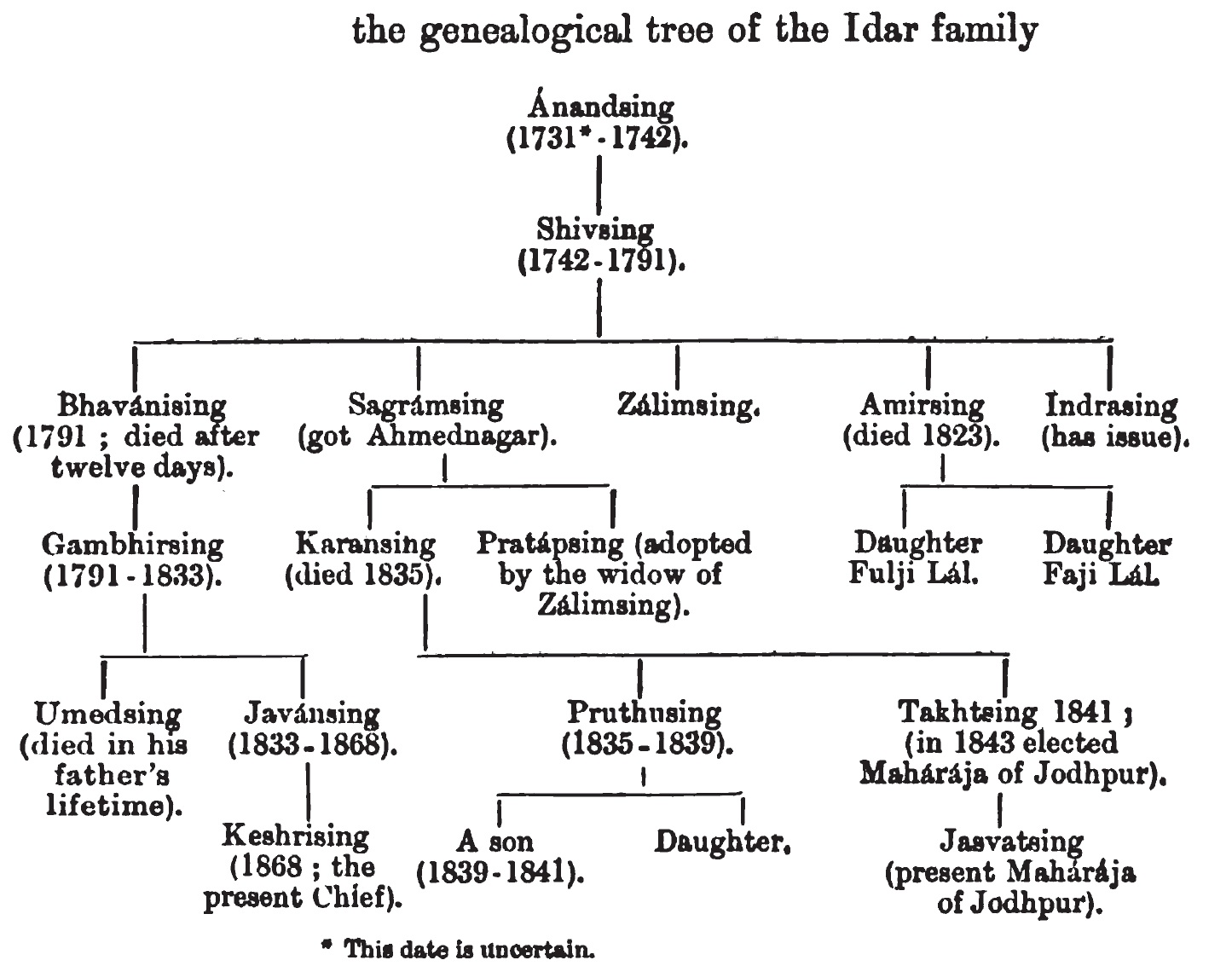
Genealogical tree of the current Idar State royal family, as of 1900

Bacha Pandit then ruled in Idar till in 1731 he was driven out by Maharajas Anandsinh and Raisinh, brothers of Maharaja Abhai Singh of Jodhpur. Of the succession of the Jodhpur chiefs of the Rathod clan two stories are told; one that they were called in by the Idar ministers; the other that they had been in revolt against their brother, the Maharaja Abhai Singh, Viceroy of Gujarat, and had been pacified by the grant of Idar.

In 1734 Jawan Mard Khan, one of the leading Gujarat Muslim nobles, marched on Idar. Anandsingh and Raisingh sought the aid of Malhar Rao Holkar and Ranoji Scindia, who were at this time in Malwa. The Maratha chiefs at once marched to their help, and Jawan Mard Khan, who found himself opposed to an overwhelming army, was forced to agree to pay a sum of £17,500 (Rs. 1,75,000). At tho close of the rainy season of 1738, Momin Khan (1738–1743) tho Governor of Gujarat came to Idar and levied tribute from the chiefs of Mohanpur and Ranasan. This tribute Anandsingh and Raisingh claimed as being within tho limits of their own territory. But tho dispute was amicably settled, Raisingh, at Momin Khan's request, remaining with him, and Momin Khan agreeing to pay his men's expenses. In 1741 Rangoji, the Maratha chief, induced Raisingh to leave Momin Khan and join his service, but Momin soon detached Raisingh from this alliance by conferring on him the districts of Modasa, Kankrej, Ahmednagar, Prantij, and Harsol. Next year (1742) the Rehvar Rajputs attacked and took Idar killing the chief Raja Anandsingh. On hearing of this, his brother Raisingh, taking leave from Momin Khan, went to Idar, attacked and drove out the Rehvars, and placing Anandsingh's son, Shivsingh, a boy of six years on the throne, himself acted as minister. Raisingh died in 1750 or 1751 or 1765.

During the Maratha and Mughal struggles which ended in the Maratha capture of Ahmedabad in 1757, Shivsing would seem to have sided with tho Mughals, and to have been, as a punishment, forced to give up Prantij, Bijapur, and his halves of Modasa, Bayad, and Harsol. About the year 1766 the Gaekwad army under Appa Saheb came to Idar and demanded from Shivsingh half of the territory of Idar as belonging to his uncle Raisingh who had died without heir. Shivsingh tried to avoid compliance, but was in the end compelled to write over a half share of the revenues of tho state. In 1778 the Peshwa's deputy at Ahmedabad, with the help of the brother of Surajmal, one of the Idar proprietors who had been put to death by the eldest son of Shivsingh, levied a tax in the Idar districts named ghanim ghoda vero or the robbers' cess. Thirteen years later Shivsingh died (1791) leaving five sons, Bhavanisingh, Sagramsingh, Zalimsingh, Amirsingh, and Indrasingh. His eldest son Bhavanising succeeded him, but dying after twelve days was succeeded by his son Gambhirsingh, then thirteen years old. Shortly after Gambhirsing's accession his uncles conspired to murder him, but the plot was found out and they were ordered to leave Idar. Sagramsingh retired to Ahmednagar, and Zalimsingh and Amirsingh for whom no provision had been made by their father took possession of the Bayad and Modasa sub-divisions. In 1795 the three brothers made a joint foray into the Idar districts, and Gambhirsingh, meeting them and being worsted, had to enter into agreements very disadvantageous to him. The brothers were allowed to keep not only tho two sub-divisions they had seized, but several other tracts including Davar, Arora, Viravada, Senol, Gabat, and the Sabarkantha tribute. These lands were taken possession of by Zalimsingh, on who so death his childless widow adopted a younger son of the Ahmednagar family. In 1801 the Koli chiefs of Gadvada were attacked and defeated by a Muslim force from Palanpur State. The chiefs applied to Gambhirsingh, but he was unable to give them any help. Next year the Gaekwad's revenue-collecting force came from Kathiawar, and encamping at Siddhpur, summoned Gambhirsingh to pay tribute arrears. Whilst at Siddhpur Gambhirsingh, by the promise of an increase in the tribute, induced the commander of the Gaekwad's force to help him in driving out the Muslims from Gadhvada. After some difficulty the tribute was settled at tho sum of £2400 (Rs. 24,000), and its name changed from tho robber-horse, ghanam ghoda, to the grass and grain, ghas–dana, cess. The Koli chiefs on their restoration to Gadhvada wrote over a third share of their revenues in Idar's favour. In 1804 the Thakor of Ghadhvada, a Rehvar chief, was murdered by his brother. Gambhirsingh helped the Thakor's son to avenge his father's death, and two-fifths of the produce of Ghadhvada were written over to Idar and afterwards assigned to Indrasingh. Gambhirsingh, in 1808, attacked Virahar, a cadet of the Pol family, also Temba a Koli village, and the villages of Navargam and Berna belonging to the Rana of Danta, from all of which he compelled the payment of tribute, khichdi. Rao Ratansingh of Pol was also obliged to enter into a similar security. Next year Gambhirsingh again sallied out and collected tribute from the Koli villages of Karcha, Samera, Dehgamri, Vangar, Vandeol, and Khuski, the last a Rajput possession. He subsequently spread his levies over the Rehvar estates of Sardoi, Mohanpur, Ranasan, and Rupal.

In 1823, Amirsingh of Bayad died leaving two daughters. Both Idar and Ahmednagar laid claim to his estates. In 1827 by the help of British Lieutenant-Colonel Ballantyne, an agreement was framed, by which Idar renounced all claim to Modasa and received two-thirds of Bayad, the remaining third going to Ahmednagar. This agreement was never carried out. One of the daughters died, and later Amirsingh's widow wrote over the estate to Gambhirsingh on condition of his effecting the marriage of her surviving daughter. The terms were not fulfilled and the daughter fled to Ahmednagar, in who so favour a precisely similar document had been executed by the mother. The daughter declined matrimony and with the help of the Ahmednagar chief continued to manage her estate. Gambhirsingh died in the midst of these discussions (1833) and the matter dropped. A few months before his death, Gambhirsing took advantage of British agent Erskine's being at Idar to make over his son to the care of the British Government. And a few years later (1837) the continued mismanagement of the Idar state and the helpless condition of the young prince induced the queen to demand help of the British Government. British Government agreed and shortly after, the Modasa and Bayad disputes were re-opened and referred by the Rani to Captain Outram. Meanwhile, the death of the Maharaja of Jodhpur, and the adoption of Takhtsing of Ahmednagar, put a stop to any further proceedings, as the Idar house claimed as the head of the family the whole of the Ahmednagar possessions. This claim the Maharaja of Jodhpur attempted to set aside. But it was finally decided by the Government of India on 14 April 1848, that Ahmednagar and its dependencies should revert to the elder or Idar branch, and that the two estates should, as they had before 1784, form one state under the Raja of Idar. It became part of Mahi Kantha Agency.

Of Gambhirsingh's two sons Umedsingh and Javansingh, the first died in his father's lifetime. Ghambhirsing was succeeded by Javansing. In 1861 Javansing entered into an agreement binding himself to prevent the smuggling of salt through his territory. Later he gained seat in Bombay Legislative Council and the reign was, in 1868, cut short by his death at the early age of thirty-eight. He was succeeded by his son Keshrisingh, during whose minority the affairs of the state are managed by the British Political Agent. Kesrisingh ruled until his death in 1901.

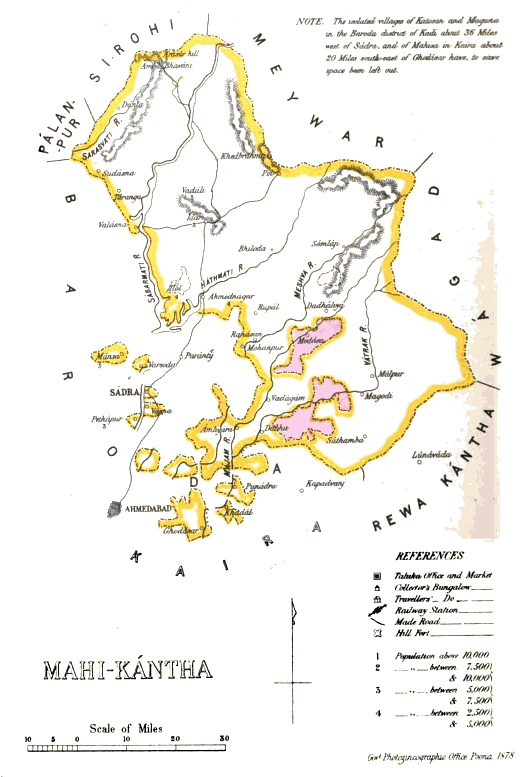
Idar in map of Mahi Kantha Agency, British India, 1878

=== 1901–1948 ===
After Interregnum from February–October 1901, his posthumous son of Sir Keshrisinhji "ruled" from his birth, eight months after his father's death, to his own death a month later. In January 1902, Pratap Singh succeeded him and ruled until May 1911. In 1924 it was made part of the Western India States Agency. It was transferred to the Rajputana Agency in the early 1940s. Daulat Singh succeeded Pratap Singh and ruled till 14 April 1931. Followed by Himmat Singh, who renamed Ahmednagar as Himmatnagar ruled until Independence of India on 15 August 1947. On 10 June 1948 Idar became part of the Indian Union. His descendants Daljit Singh and Rajendra Singh became titular kings of state.

== 1948 – Present ==
In 1949, erstwhile Idar State was dissolved and split between Sabarkantha and Mehsana districts which were at that point in Bombay State. Both of these districts became part of Gujarat when it was formed in 1960. Himatnagar became capital of Sabarkantha district eclipsing Idar. Idar continued as taluka (subdivision) of Sabarkantha district. Idar expanded significantly when some villages were relocated to Idar for construction of Dharoi Dam. Later when Aravalli district carved out of Sabarkantha in 2013, Modasa became capital of new district.
