= Daphlapur State =

Princely state of British India

Coordinates: 17°0′N 75°07′E

Daphlapur State डफळापूर संस्थान
- Princely State of British India
- 1686–1917
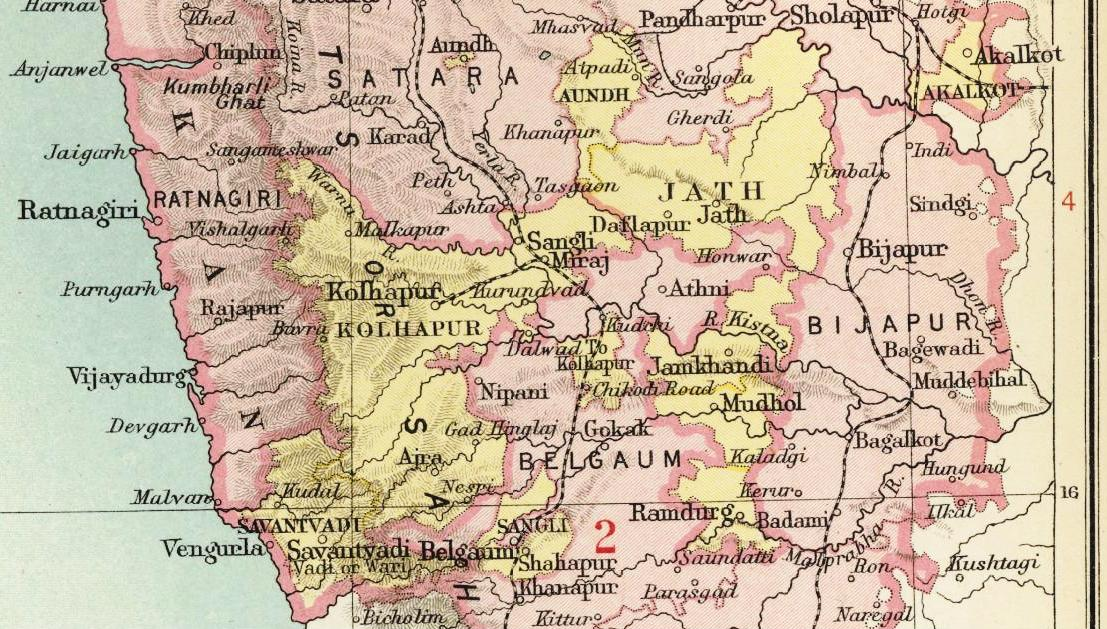
- Daphlapur State in the Imperial Gazetteer of India
- Area
  - 1881: 249 km^{2} (96 sq mi)
- Population
  - 1881: 6,006
- Government
  - Type: Jagir (until 1849); Princely state (from 1849)
- History
  - Established: 1686
  - Annexation by Jath State: 1917
Preceded by	Succeeded by
Maratha Empire	Jath State
- Today part of: Maharashtra, India

Daphalapur State, also spelled Dafalapur, was a Hindu petty princely state of British India. It was a former Maratha territory, one of the former Southern Maratha Jagirs (feudal estates).

Daphlapur State and neighbouring Jath State were the only two states belonging to the Bijapur Agency under the Bombay Presidency, which later would become part of the colonial Deccan States Agency.

The state had six villages with an area of only 249 square kilometres (96 sq mi) and a population of 6,006 inhabitants in 1881.

== History ==
The state was founded in 1680 as Daphlapur. Akalkot, Aundh, Bhor, Daphlapur, Jath, and Phaltan, which were Jagirs of Satara State, became tributaries to the British when Satara state was abolished in 1849. Following British rule in the area it came under the collector of Bijapur District, together with larger Jath State. The third widow of the last ruler, Ranibai Lakshmibai Saheb, died without succession and the dynasty line of the state became extinguished. Then Daphlapur ended up being annexed by Jath State on 27 January 1917. The Chavan (Daphales) of Jath were one of the oldest and high caste Maratha noble families of the Deccan. Initially the Chavans were the Patil of Daphalapur. This role of the Chavans has been confirmed by Grand Duff. The daphalapur state was founded by Satvaji Chavan allas Daphale in 1672. This state came into existence during the Maratha period and lasted up to the end of the British period. Satvaji was very ambitious. He was a great military general. He had a chequered career because he underwent various ups and downs and ultimately carved out an important Maratha state for his family near Bijapur. This fact itself indicates the great achievement of Satvaji Chavan. Satvaji Chavan, at the beginning of his career served Adilshahi and later joined the Maratha general Santaji Ghorpade

== Rulers ==
The rulers of the state belonged to the Dafle dynasty and bore the (rarely modest) title of Deshmukh.

On 27 January 1917, the state was incorporated into Jath, whose rulers (also styled Deshmukh) shared the same Dafle bloodline, owing to lack of succession and were awarded a Privy Purse of 49,924 Rupees. The joint state ceased to exist on 8 March 1948 by accession to Bombay state.

=== Deshmukhs ===
- 1680 – 1703 Satvaji Rao I (d. 1706)
- 1703 – 1704 Bovaji Rao (d. 1704)
- 1704 – 1748 Yesu Bai "Au Sahib" (female) (d. 1754)
- 1748 – 1759 Yeshwant Rao (d. 1759)
- 1759 – 1790 Amrit Rao I (d. 1790)
- 1790 – 1810 Khanji Rao (b. 17.. – d. 1810)
- 1810 – 1822 Renuka Bai (female) – Regent (d. 1822) (administrator from 1816)
- 1822 – December 1885 Satvaji Rao II (b. 1797 – d. 1885)
- 16 December 1885 – 13 January 1917 Rani Bai Saheb Daphlé (female) (b. 1834 – d. 1917)

== See also ==
- Maratha Empire
- List of Maratha dynasties and states
- List of princely states of British India (alphabetical)
