= Rehvar =

The Rehwar (also spelled Rahevar or Rehavar) are a clan of Rajputs belonging to the Parmar lineage. They trace their descent from the medieval Parmara rulers of Mount Abu and Chandravati. Following their dispersion from Mount Abu in the late 13th century, the clan migrated into northern Gujarat, establishing settlements across Banaskantha and the Mahi Kantha Agency (modern Sabarkantha and Banaskantha).

== Origin and lineage ==
The Rehwar Rajputs belong to the Agnivansha lineage and are an offshoot of the Parmar (Puwar) clan, tracing their origins to the Paramara rulers of Mount Abu and Chandravati.

=== Lineage and migration ===
According to regional chronicles, the clan traces its lineage to the Parmar rulers of Mount Abu. Following the displacement of the Parmars from Mount Abu and the Deora Chauhans in the late 13th century, branches of the clan migrated southward through Tharparkar into northern Gujarat, establishing estates across the Mahi Kantha Agency.

=== Clan name tradition ===
According to clan tradition:

- During the journey of Parmar bridegrooms (baraat) toward a proposed alliance with the Deoras, one groom remained behind to hunt, instructing the party to go ahead.
- While hunting, the clan deity (Kuldevi) reportedly commanded "Reh, Var!" ("Stay, Groom!"), warning him against proceeding.
- He stayed behind, escaping the ambush that killed the other Parmar princes.
- His descendants adopted the name Rehwar (derived from the words Reh-Var).

== Princely states and estates ==
During the period of the British Raj, the Rehwar Rajputs held jurisdictional authority over several princely states and non-jurisdictional talukas in northern Gujarat, primarily organized under the Mahi Kantha Agency within the Bombay Presidency.

=== Major princely states ===
- Mohanpur State (Sardoi): A princely state founded by Thakore Harisingh after receiving the Hathrol estate from Idar State. Rulers exercised civil and criminal judicial powers within the Mahi Kantha Agency.
- Ranasan State: Considered the senior branch of the clan in Mahi Kantha, Ranasan was a Fifth-Class non-salute princely state with its capital at Ranasan. The Thakores of Ranasan held administrative and judicial authority across their territory until its integration into India in 1947–1948.
- Vadagam State: Established by Thakore Keshavdasji, a younger son of Thakore Rajsinhji of Ranasan, Vadagam was situated along the Majham River. The state maintained local administration before being attached to Idar under the 1943 Attachment Scheme prior to Indian independence.
- Rupal State: A recognized jurisdictional taluka in the Mahi Kantha Agency, held by a Rehwar lineage descended from Ranasan, with its chief holding the hereditary title of Thakore.

=== Other estates and jagirs ===
In addition to the primary jurisdictional states, secondary estates, branch thikanas, and inam holdings were governed by Rehwar chieftains, including:

- Sardoi: An estate tied by lineage and succession to Mohanpur.
- Bolundra: A petty taluka held by Rehwar chiefs within the Mahi Kantha division.
- Mordungra: A landed estate under the administrative supervision of the regional agency.

All Rehwar-ruled states acceded to the Dominion of India following independence in August 1947, being initially integrated into Bombay State and subsequently into Gujarat upon the state's reorganization in 1960.

== History and military engagements ==
Historically settled in the frontier tracts of the Mahi Kantha Agency, the Rehwar Rajputs were involved in regional military and political developments in northern Gujarat.

=== Early settlements (pre-17th century) ===
- Taranga Hill (c. 1226): The Rehwars fortified Taranga Hill around 1226, holding it until conflict with the Gadhia Chauhan chieftain, Sartanji, led them to move into the plains.
- Founding of Mohanpur Taluka: Thakore Harisingh, brother of Kasamdas of Mohanpur, participated in campaigns on the border frontiers of Idar. In recognition of his service, the ruler of Idar granted him the tappa of Hathrol comprising 22 villages, establishing the Mohanpur estate.
- Regional engagements:
  - Mundasji Rehwar defeated the outlaw Chanpla Hobadia on the Idar frontier, receiving the hereditary estate (inam) of Jamla from Idar as a reward.

=== 17th century ===
- Incident with Dungarpur (c. 1650): After the preceding events a dispute concerning rank arose between Rao Jagannath of Idar and the Sisodia Rawal Punja of Dungarpur. On the border of the two states stands the temple of Shamlaji, where the two chiefs met. During the meeting the Rawal’s handkerchief fell to the ground. As the junior of the two, the Rao picked it up and handed it back. People, however, spread the story that the Rawal had forcibly made the Rao touch his feet. Thakur Mohandas (Rehwar) of Mohanpur, who was loyal to Idar and had rendered many important services to the Rao, became angry on learning of the alleged insult. He marched against Dungarpur, took the Rawal prisoner, and after the Rawal had touched the Rao’s feet, dismissed him with the ceremonial gift of honour (shiropav). The Rawal was seized while he was seated in worship, and the image before which he had been praying was brought to Mohanpur, where it is still installed.
- Defence of Ranasan: Acting as a Mughal patrol officer, Rao Arjundas sought to assert authority over the region and planned an offensive against the Ahmedabad districts. Returning from Ahmedabad, he enlisted the military support of the young royal heirs (kunwars) of Lunavada, Dungarpur, Banswara, and Devalia (Pratapgarh). The combined coalition turned their forces against Ranasan to crush Rehwar power and bring the territory under control. The Rehwar defenders met the assault head-on and decisively routed the invasion, slaying Rao Arjundas alongside the princes of Lunavada, Dungarpur, and Devalia—leaving only the prince of Banswara as the sole surviving leader to collect and cremate the bodies of his fallen allies.
- Expulsion of Rao Gopinath: When Arjundas's brother Rao Gopinath assumed control, Thakore Garibdas Rehwar of Ranasan secured Mughal military support from Ahmedabad, expelling Gopinath into the hills. Garibdas subsequently served as de facto administrator of Idar alongside Motichand Shah of Vadali.

=== 18th century ===
- Idar conflicts (1742–1748):
  - In 1742, Rehwar forces attacked the capital of Idar, during which the ruler, Raja Anand Singh, was killed.
  - Anand Singh's brother, Rai Singh, subsequently retook Idar and seized 24 villages belonging to Ranasan. Following sustained skirmishes, the seized villages were returned along with additional territorial concessions.
- Maratha involvement (1788–1789): Rehwar chieftains allied with the Rao of Pol and brought Gaekwad commander Apa Saheb into the region to counterbalance Idar.
- Conflicts with Ahmednagar and Modasa:
  - In 1795, when Thakore Hindusinghji of Sardoi claimed the Mohanpur succession, Maharaja Jamalsinghji of Ahmednagar besieged Mohanpur, but the garrison maintained defense.
  - In 1799, the Rehwar estates of Mohanpur, Sardoi, Ranasan, and Rupal formed an alliance to resist incursions by Jalam Sinh of Modasa.

=== 19th-century British administration ===
- Engagement at Rupal (1834): Thakore Fatehsinghji of Rupal resisted tribute demands from Baroda State. Following diplomatic contact with the British authorities, the taluka's status was confirmed under British political supervision.
- Boundary arbitrations: Succession and territorial disputes in Rupal (1843–1844), Ranasan (1850), and Vadagam were arbitrated by the British Political Agent at Sadra, establishing recognized boundaries and administrative ranks for the Rehwar estates.
