= Deccan States Agency =

Former political agency of India

Coordinates: 16°41′N 74°14′E

- 1933–1947
- Flag

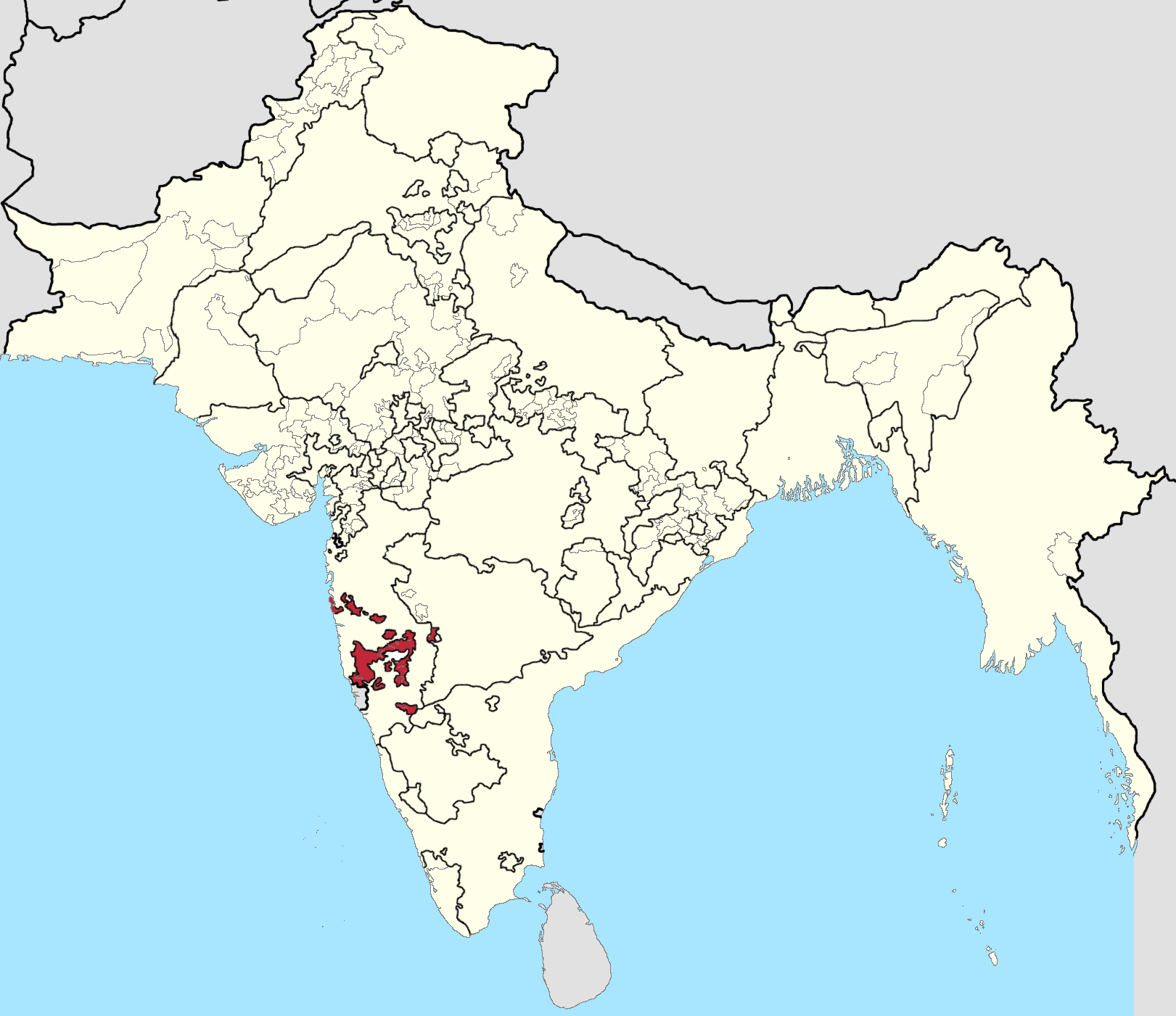
- The Deccan States Agency in the Indian Empire in 1942
- Capital: Kolhapur
- Religion: Hinduism
- States under AGG for Deccan States: Kolhapur State; Jath State; Bhor State; Other 3 salute states, 11 non-salute states and 1 estate
- Government: Indirect imperial rule over a group of hereditary monarchies
- Agent to the Governor-General
  - 1933 (first): J.C. Tate
- Historical era: Interwar period • World War II
  - Merger of Kolhapur Agency and four smaller agencies: 1933
  - Merger into Bombay following Independence of India: 1947
Preceded by	Succeeded by
Bengal Presidency	Bombay State
- "A collection of treaties, engagements, and sunnuds relating to India and neighbouring countries"

The Deccan States Agency, also known as the Deccan States Agency and Kolhapur Residency, was a political agency of India, managing the relations of the Government of India with a collection of princely states and jagirs (feudal 'vassal' estates) in western India.

== History ==
The agency was created in 1933 with the merger of the Kolhapur Agency (Kolhapur Residency), Poona Agency, Bijapur Agency, Dharwar Agency and Kolaba Agency.

It was composed of a number of princely states and jagirs in Western India, located in the present-day Indian states of Maharashtra and Karnataka, six of which were Salute states. The princely states included in the agency were under the suzerainty, but not the control, of the British authorities of the Bombay Presidency.

After Indian Independence in 1947, the states all acceded to the Dominion of India, and were integrated into the Indian state of Bombay. In 1956 the Kannada language speaking southern portion of Bombay state, which included the former states of the Southern Maratha Country, was transferred to Mysore State (later renamed Karnataka). Bombay State was divided into the new states of Maharashtra and Gujarat in 1960.

== Princely (e)states ==
=== States of the former Kolhapur Agency ===
Salute states, by precedence :

- Kolhapur, title Maharaja; Hereditary 19-guns salute
- Janjira, title Nawab; Hereditary 11-guns (13-guns local):
- Sangli, title Raja; Hereditary 9-guns (11-guns personal)
- Mudhol, title Raja; Hereditary 9-guns

Non-salute states, alphabetically :

- Akalkot, title Raja
- Aundh, title Pant Pratinidhi
- Jamkhandi, title Raja
- Kurundwad Junior, title Rao
- Kurundwad Senior, title Rao
- Miraj Junior, title Rao
- Miraj Senior, title Rao
- Phaltan, title Naik
- Ramdurg, title Raja

=== Jagirs of the former Kolhapur Agency ===
- Bavda estate
- Gajendragad (Gajendragarh)
- ? Nesri
- ? Himmat Bahadur
- Ichalkaranji estate
- Kagal Junior
- Kagal Senior
- Kapshi estate
- Latur estate
- Sar Lashkar Khardekar
- Torgal Jagir
- Vishalgad estate

=== States of the other former colonial agencies ===
Former Bijapur Agency, both non-salute :

- Daphlapur (Daflepur), title Deshmukh (1917 incorporated in Jath, below)
- Jath (Joth), title Raja (till 1936 Deshmukh)

Former Kolaba Agency:

- Sawantwadi (Savantwadi), title Raja Bahadur; Hereditary salute of 9-guns (11-guns local)

Former Dharwar Agency : non-salute :

- Savanur, title Nawab

Former Poona Agency :

- Bhor, title Raja, Hereditary salute of 9-guns

== See also ==
- List of Maratha dynasties and states
- Maratha Empire
