= Vakhtapur =

Vakhtapur or Vaktapur may refer to the following paces in Gujarat, western India :

- Vakhtapur (Mahi Kantha), a village and former princely state in Mahi Kantha
- Vakhtapur (Rewa Kantha), a village and former princely state in Rewa Kantha
- Vaktapur, a modern village in Vadnagar Taluka, Mehsana District, possibly identical to one of the above
