= Sardoi =

- Village
- Location in Gujarat, India
- Coordinates: 23°34′1.2″N 73°16′1.2″E
- Country: India
- State: Gujarat
- District: Aravalli
- Taluka: Modasa

Population (2011)
  - Total: 2,995

Languages
  - Official: Gujarati, Hindi
- Time zone: UTC+5:30 (IST)
- PIN: 383320
- Telephone code: 02774

Sardoi is a village in Modasa Taluka in the Aravalli district of Gujarat state in India. It is located 34.8 km from Himmatnagar and 93.6 km from Gandhinagar, the capital of Gujarat.

== Location ==
The nearby villages include Davli, which is approximately 4 km away, Sajapur-Tintisar, which is approximately 1 km away, Bolundra, which is approximately 6 km away, Gadhada, which is approximately 6 km away, and Rajendranagar, which is approximately 6 km away. Sardoi Village is bounded as follows:

North: Bhiloda Taluka,
East: Meghraj Taluka,
South: Dhansura Taluka,
West: Himmatnagar Taluka.

== Demographics ==
The total population of Sardoi village as per the last census is 3079, which includes 1550 males and 1529 females.

== History ==
Sardoi (historically recorded as Sirdoi in colonial-era documents) is associated with the Paramara (Parmar) dynasty, a Rajput lineage historically linked to regions such as Chandravati in present-day Rajasthan. Branches of this lineage are believed to have migrated into northern Gujarat during the medieval period.

The Gazetteer of the Bombay Presidency: Cutch, Pálanpur, and Mahi Kántha refers to the settlement as “Sirdoi” and documents the presence of Rehevar (Puwar) families of the Parmar dynasty in the area, who exercised authority as local chiefs or jagirdars.

During the early modern period, the region formed part of a network of minor Rajput-ruled estates. It was later incorporated into the Mahi Kantha Agency under the Bombay Presidency during British colonial administration.

Historical records indicate that Thakore Hindusinhji Pratapsinhji, a native of Sardoi, became the ruler of Mohanpur State in 1795. The state subsequently came under British administration and continued until its accession to the Union of India in 1948.

The historical development of Sardoi reflects broader patterns of Paramara expansion into Gujarat, in which lineage-based authority contributed to the establishment of multiple small states and estates governed by related Rajput clans.

== Places of interest ==
The village contains several religious sites, including temples dedicated to Chamunda Mataji"Chamunda Mataji Temple"., Harsiddhi Mataji"Harsiddhi Mataji Temple". and Ramji Temple"Ramji Temple". It also includes both Digambar and Shwetambar Jain temples "Shree Adinath Shwetambar Murtipujak Jain Derasar"., as well as a Gayatri Ashram"Gayatri Ashram Sardoi".

At the entrance of the village is the Bahucharmata Temple"Shri Bahuchar Mataji Mandir". Behind it is the Jagannath Bhagwan Temple located within Shandilya Ashram"Sri Jagannath Temple".
