= Banali =

Village in Maharashtra

- village
- Location in Maharashtra, India Banali (India)
- Coordinates: 17°8′38.07″N 75°12′52.35″E
- Country: India
- State: Maharashtra
- District: Sangli

Languages
  - Official: Marathi
- Time zone: UTC+5:30 (IST)
- PIN: 416404
- Telephone code: 02344
- Vehicle registration: MH-10

Banali is a village in the Jath taluka of Sangli District in Maharashtra, India. Situated 10 km north of Jath via Achakanhalli, the village has a temple to the Hindu goddess Banshankari, also known as Shakambhari.

The village had a population of 3212 of which 1655 were male and 1557 were female as per the 2011 census. There were 1746 workers in Banali, 949 males and 797 females.

In 2011, the literacy rate of Banali was 71.86% compared to 82.32% for Maharashtra as a whole.

The total area is 2254.00 hectares, or 22.54 square kilometers.

== See also ==
- Jath State in British India
