= Ramas =

Ramas may refer to:

- Ramas State, a town and former Makwana Koli princely state in Mahi Kantha, and a village in Gujarat
- Cristobal Ramas (born 1935), Filipino Olympic basketball player
- Kevin Ramas (born 1967), Filipino basketball player
- Samanta Roy Institute of Science and Technology, or the Ramas, a fundamentalist religious cult based in Shawano, Wisconsin
