= Dabha =

Dabha may refer to the following places in India :

- Dabha, Gujarat, a village on Sauarashtra peninsula
- Dabha State, a former princely state of Kathiawar with seat in the above town
- Dabha, Maharasthra, a village in Hingna taluka
