= Jath State =

Princely state in India, 1686 to 1948

Coordinates: 17°03′N 75°16′E

- 1686–1948
- Flag

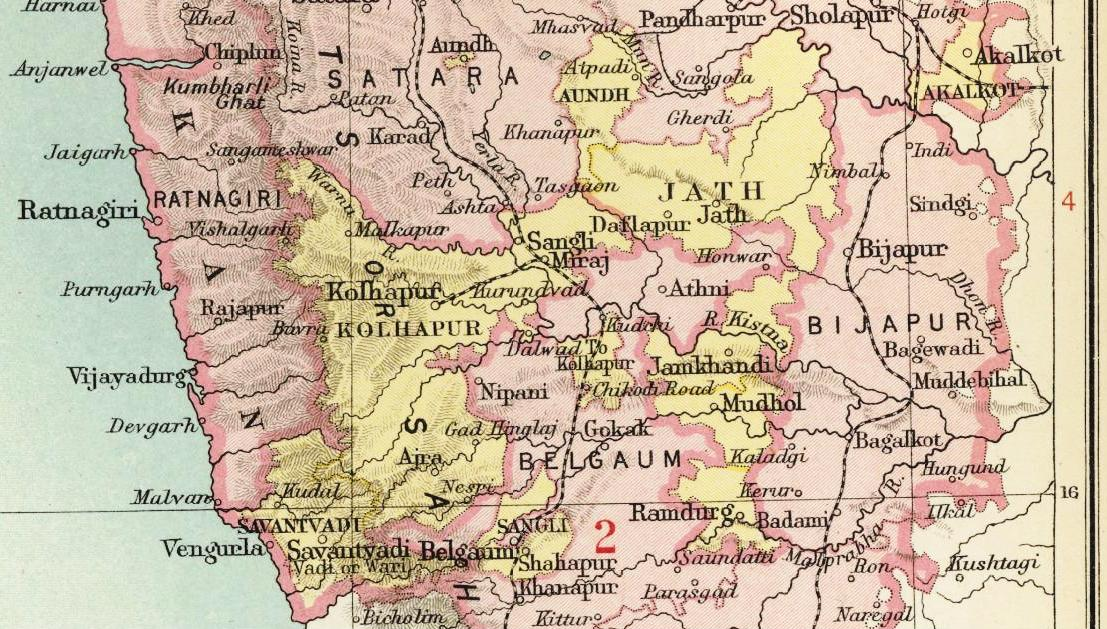
- Jath State in the Imperial Gazetteer of India
- Government: Jagir (until 1849); Princely state (from 1849)
- History
  - Established: 1686
  - Independence of India: 1948

Area
- 1931: 2,538 km^{2} (980 sq mi)

Population
  - 1931: 91,202
Preceded by	Succeeded by
Maratha Empire	India
- Today part of: Maharashtra, India

Jath State, was one of the non-salute Maratha princely states of Deccan States Agency, one of the former Southern Maratha Jagirs. Jath State and Daphlapur State were the only two states belonging to the Bijapur Agency under the Bombay Presidency, which later became part of the Deccan States Agency.

The state was founded in 1686 by the hereditary Patil (chief) of Daphlapur. Jath state (including Daphlapur) covered an area of 980 square miles (2,500 km^{2}), and had a population of 68,665 in 1901, while the population of Jath town itself was 5,414 in that year. The Raja was married to Princess Usharaje Gaekwad of Baroda who was the grand daughter of Maharaja Sayajirao Gaekwad.

== History ==
The Hindu ruling family of Jath State were Dafles of the Maratha Chavan clan, descendants of Lakhmajirao Yeldojirao Chavan, the Patil of Daphlapur. Lakhmajirao Yeldojirao Chavan entered the service of King Ali Adil Shah of Bijapur, and received a Desmukhi Watan of four Mahals in 1672. The Jagirs of Jath and Karajagi were conferred on his son in 1680. Emperor Aurangzeb confirmed these estates to the family in 1704. The male line failed four times during the state's history. Consequently, the state was either vested in widowed Ranis or ruled for them by regents for a total of seven decades.

Akalkot, Aundh, Bhor, Daphlapur, Jath, and Phaltan, which were Jagirs of Satara State, became tributaries to the British when Satara state was abolished in 1849.

Together with the small state of Daphlapur, Jath State formed the Bijapur Agency, under the collector of Bijapur District. Daphlapur had an area of only 249 km^{2} and was annexed by Jath State in the early 20th century owing to lack of succession.

In 1911, the state enjoyed a revenue estimated at £24,000 and paid a tribute to the British Raj of £700. Its flag was an orange rectangle with a four-pointed star in the upper left hand corner.

== Rulers of Jath ==
The rulers of Jath belonged to the Dafle dynasty. The last ruler Vijayasingh Rao Ram Rao took the title of 'Raja'.

=== Deshmukhs ===
- 1686 - 1706 Satvaji Rao (b. 16... - d. 1706)
- 1706 - 1754 Yesu Bai "Au Sahib" (b. ... - d. 1754)
- 1754 - 1759 Yeshwant Rao (b. ... - d. 1759)
- 1759 - 1790 Amrit Rao I (b. ... - d. 1790)
- 1790 - 1810 Khanji Rao (b. 17... - d. 1810)
- 1810 - 1822 Renuka Bai (b. ... - d. 1822)
- 1822 - Dec 1823 Sali Bai (b. ... - d. 1823)
- Dec 1823 - Aug 1835 Ram Rao I Narayan Rao "Aba Sahib Dafle" (b. ... - d. 1835)
- Aug 1835 - 29 Jul 1846 Bhagirathi Bai (b. ... - d. 1846)
- 29 Jul 1846 – 11 Jan 1892 Amrit Rao II "Rao Sahib Dafle" (b. 1835 - d. 1892)
- 13 Jan 1892 – 14 Aug 1928 Ram Rao II Amrit Rao "Aba Sahib Dafle" (b. 1886 - d. 1928)
- 14 Aug 1928 – 23 Jun 1936 Vijayasingh Rao Ram Rao "Baba Sahib Dafle" (b. 1909 - d. 1998)
- Anil Raje Dafle (d.2020)
- Indrajeet Raje Daphale
- Shardulraje Dafle (b.1980)

== See also ==
- Maratha
- Maratha Empire
- List of Maratha dynasties and states
- List of Indian princely states
