= Likhi =

Likhi may refer to:

Places

- The Likhi Range, in Georgia, Transcaucasia
- Likhi State, a former princely state in Mahi Kantha, Gujarat, western India
