= Idar =

Idar may refer to:

== People ==
- Idar Andersen (born 1999), Norwegian road racing cyclist
- Idar Kreutzer (born 1962), Norwegian businessperson
- Idar Kristiansen (1932–1985), Norwegian poet, novelist, short story writer and non-fiction writer
- Idar Lind (born 1954), Norwegian novelist, crime fiction writer, songwriter and playwright
- Idar Lysgård (born 1994), Norwegian football player
- Idar Mathiassen (born 1976), Norwegian football player
- Idar Norstrand (1915–1986), Norwegian civil servant and politician
- Idar D. Rimestad
- Idar Ulstein (1934–2012), Norwegian businessperson
- Idar of Circassia, Circassian ruler of the Caucasus
- Jovita Idar (1885–1946), American journalist and civil rights activist

== Places ==
- Idar, Gujarat, India
  - History of Idar
- Idar Forest, Germany
- Idar State, India
- Idar-Oberstein, Germany

== Other ==
- Battles of Idar
