= Hadol =

Hadol may refer to:

- Hadol, Vosges, a commune in the Grand Est region, France
- Hadol State, a village and former princely state in Mahi Kantha, Gujarat, India
- Paul Hadol (1835–1875), French illustrator and caricaturist
