= Gokalpura =

Gokalpura may refer to the following places in India :

- a village in Mahesana Taluka, in Mehsana District, Gujarat
- a village in Vadodara Taluka, in Vadodara district, Gujarat
- Gokalpura State, a village (perhaps identical to one of the above) and former princely state in Mahi Kantha, Gujarat
- a village in Loharu Tehsil, Haryana
