= Phaltan State =

Political entity in British India

Coordinates: 17°59′40″N 78°41′20″E

- 1284–1948
- Flag

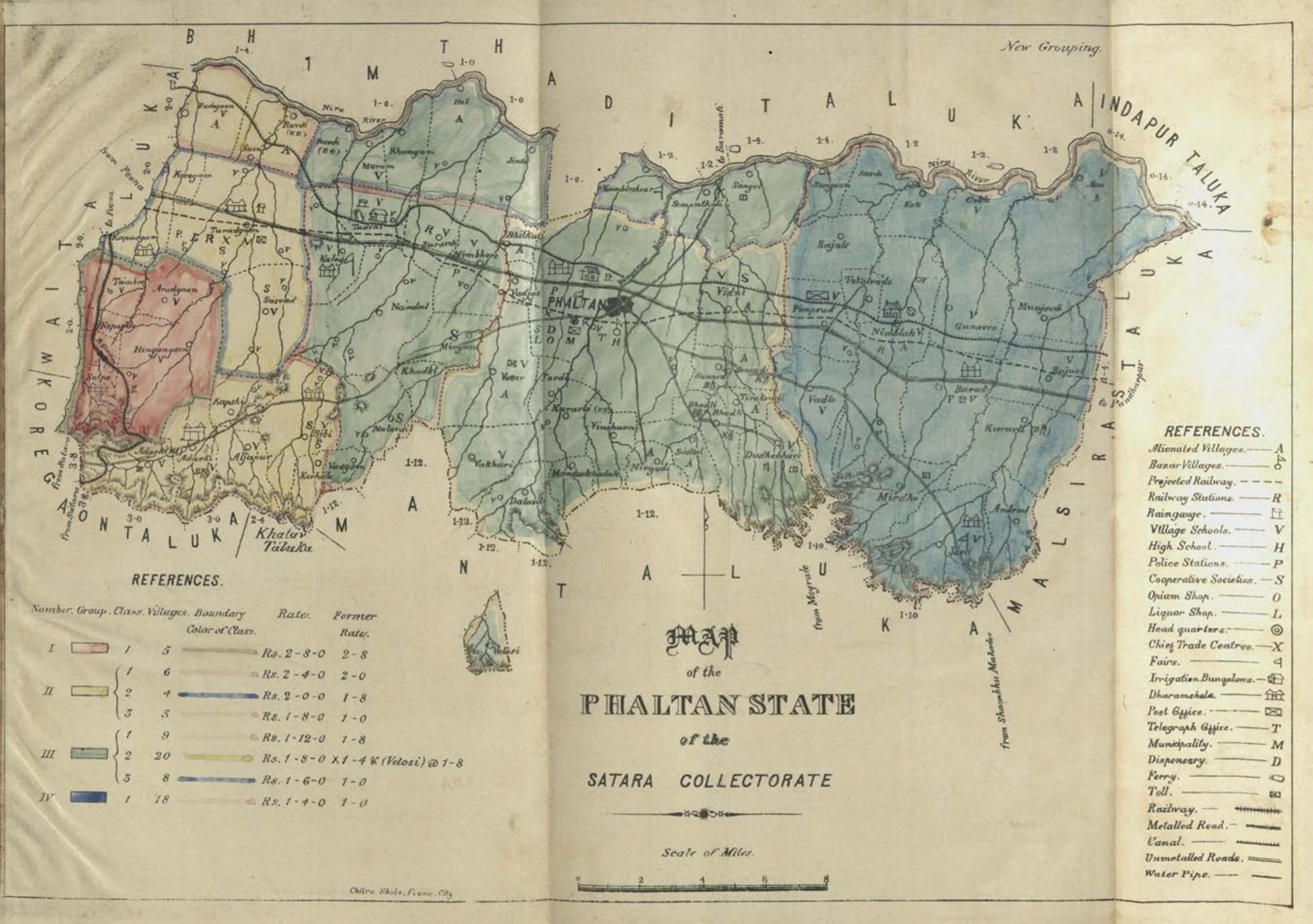
- Phaltan State, 1918
- Area
  - 1931: 1,028 km^{2} (397 sq mi)
- Population
  - 1931: 58,761
  - Type: Jagir (until 1849); Princely state (from 1849)
- History
  - Established: 1284
  - Independence of India: 1948
Preceded by	Succeeded by
Maratha Empire	India
- Today part of: Maharashtra, India

Phaltan State was one of the non-salute Maratha princely states of British India. It was ruled by the Nimbalkar clan of the Marathas. It was under the central division of the Bombay Presidency, under the states of the Kolhapur-Deccan Residency, Satara Agency, and later the Deccan States Agency. Its capital was Phaltan town, located in present-day Maharashtra.

It had been one of the Satara Jagirs, which included Bhor, Aundh, Phaltan, Jath, Daphlapur and Akalkot. Its Flag was a rectangular bicolor, orange over green.

== Geography ==
The state measured 397 square miles (1,028 km^{2}) in area. According to the 1901 census, the population showed a decrease of 31% in the decade at 45,739. The population of the town itself was 9,512 in that year.

== History ==
The Hindu ruling family was descended from Naik Nimbaji Parmar (1284–1291), whose descendants received a grant from a Delhi Sultanate emperor in the 14th century. The ruler had the title of Raja, or Naik Nimbalkar. The first wife, Sai Bai, of 17th century Maratha Emperor Shivaji, was from Phaltan. Major HH Raja Bahadur Shrimant Malojirao Mudhojirao Nanasaheb Naik Nimbalkar IV was the last Ruler of Phaltan.

Akalkot, Aundh, Bhor, Daphlapur, Jath, and Phaltan, which were Jagirs of Satara State, became tributaries to the British when Satara state was abolished in 1849.

In 1901, the state enjoyed revenue estimated at £13,000- and paid a tribute to the British Raj of £640. On June 19, 1947, Udaysinha Naik Nimbalkar Rajkumar, Prince of Phaltan, and his mother the Maharani of Phaltan were passengers on Pan Am Flight 121, crewed by Gene Roddenberry, which crashed in Syria. Phaltan acceded to the Dominion of India on 8 March 1948 and is currently a part of Maharashtra state.

== List of Rulers ==
- Nimbraj I Parmar, Naik 1284–1291
- Padakhala Jagdevrao Dharpatrao Nimbalkar, Naik 1291–1327
- Nimbraj II Nimbalkar, Naik 1327–1349
- Vanang Bhupal Nimbalkar, Naik 1349–1374
- Vanangpal Nimbalkar, Naik 1390–1394
- Vangoji I Nimbalkar, Naik 1394–1409
- Maloji I Nimbalkar, Naik 1409–1420
- Baji I Nimbalkar, Naik 1420–1445
- Powwarao Nimbalkar, Naik 1445–1470
- Baji II Nimbalkar, Naik 1470–1512
- Mudhoji I Nimbalkar, Naik 1512–1527
- Baji Dharrao Nimbalkar, Naik 1527–1560
- Maloji II Nimbalkar, Naik 1560–1570
- Vangoji II Jagpalrao Nimbalkar, Naik 1570–1630
- Mudhoji II Nimbalkar, Naik 1630–1644
- Bajaji Rao Naik Nimbalkar, Naik 1644–1676
- Vangoji III Nimbalkar, Naik 1676–1693
- Janoji Nimbalkar, Naik 1693–1748
- Mudhojirao III Nimbalkar, Naik 1748–1765
- Sayajirao Nimbalkar, Naik 1765–1774
- Maloji III Rao Nimbalkar, Naik 1774–1777
- Janojirao II Nimbalkar, Naik 1777–1827
- Bajaji II Rao Nimbalkar, Naik 1827–1841
- Mudhoji IV Rao Naik Nimbalkar, Raja Shrimant, 1841–1916 (longest-reigning monarch in Phaltan)
- Maloji IV Rao Mudhojirao Naik Nimbalkar, Raja Bahadur Shrimant 1916–1948, Head of the royal family 1948–1978.
- Pratapsinh Malojirao Naik Nimbalkar, Head of the royal family 1978-2006.
- Ramraje Pratapsinh Naik Nimbalkar 2006- till today.

== See also ==
- Maratha
- Maratha Empire
- List of Maratha dynasties and states
- List of Indian princely states
