= Wadagam State =

Historical administrative region in present-day Gujarat, India

Coordinates: 24°5′N 72°29′E

Wadagam State વડગામ
- Princely State of British India
- TBD–1948
- Flag
- Capital: Wadagam
- Area
  - 1931: 73 km^{2} (28 sq mi)
- Population
  - 1931: 3,938
- History
  - Established: TBD
  - Independence of India: 1948
Succeeded by
India
- Wadagam (Princely State)

The Vadagam State (Gujarati: વડગામ; Hindi: वड़ागाम) was a 5th Class princely state belonging to the Mahi Kantha Agency of the Bombay Presidency during the era of the British Raj. It had its capital in Wadagam Sabarkantha district of present-day Gujarat State. Wadagam State's last ruler signed the accession to join the Indian Union in 1948.

== History ==
Wadagam state was founded by Kumar Shri Keshavdasji Rajsinhji of Ranasan, a scion of the family of Ranasan and the former Raos of Chandravati.

== Rulers ==
The rulers of Wadagam State bore the title 'Thakur'.

- .... – .... Keshavdasji Rajsinhji
- .... – ....
- .... – .... Umedsinhji
- .... – .... Gulabsimhji Umedsinhji
- .... – ....
- .... – .... Rajsinhi
- .... – ....
- 9 Feb 1848 – .... Kesrisinhji Pahadji (b. 1821 – d. ....)
- 12 Feb 1920 – .... Gopalsinhji Kesrisinhji
- 14 Jan 1929 – 1947 Vakhatsimhji (b. 1918)

== See also ==
- List of Rajput dynasties and states
- Mahi Kantha Agency
