= Kadoli State =

Former princely state in India

Kadoli State was a former non-salute princely state of India centered on the present-day village of the same name in the Sabarkantha district of Gujarat in western India. The lesser princely state, comprising the village and a second one, belonged to Sabar Kantha thana, in Mahi Kantha. It was ruled by chieftains who were 'non-jurisdictional'. In 1901 it had a combined population of 931, yielding 3,781 Rupees state revenue (1903–4, mostly from land), paying two tributes: 513 Rupees to the Gaikwar Baroda State and 93 Rupees to Idar State.
