= Deloli =

Village in Gujarat, India

Deloli is a village in the Mahesana district of Gujarat, in western India.

== History ==
Deloli was a petty princely state comprising only the village in Mahi Kantha.

Deloli had a population of 800 in 1901, yielding a state revenue of about 3,095 rupees (which is about equal to 41.52 dollars) (1903–1904, nearly all from land), paying a tribute of 256 Rupees to the Gaikwar Baroda State.
