= Valasna State =

State of India

Flag of Valasna State

Valasana, India is known for its great history. situated on the banks Of The Sabarmati river.

There is two forts for rajparivar.

== History ==
The Fifth Class state and taluka in Mahi Kantha comprised ten villages, covering 21 square miles.

It had a combined population of 2,749 in 1901, yielding a state revenue of 5,953 Rupees (mostly from land), paying a tribute of 280 Rupees to the Gaekwar Baroda State.

== Rulers ==
Its rulers were styled Thakur

- 1812 - .... Nathu Singh
- c.1880 Man Singh (b. 1850 - d. ....)
- .... - 1926 Hamir Singh (b. 1881 - d. 1926)
- 1926 - 1947 Shiv Singh (b. 1910).
- Thakore Sahib Shri Badrinarayansinh
- Kunwar Sahib Shri Satyanarayansinh Rathore

== External links and Sources ==
- Imperial Gazetteer, on DSAL - Mahi Kantha
- WorldStatesmen - India - Princely States K-Z, with flag
