= Timba State =

Former princely state in Gujarat, India

Timba is a village and former petty princely state in Gujarat, western India.

== History ==
Timba was a Seventh Class taluka and princely state in Mahi Kantha, also comprising four more villages. Chieftains and part of the Gadhwara thana.

It had a combined population of 1,675 in 1901, yielding a state revenue of 935 Rupees (1903–4, mostly from land) and paying 50 Rupees tribute to timba State.
