= Dedhrota =

Village in Gujarat, India

Dedhrota State
- Princely State
- late 18th century–1948
  - Type: Jurisdictional
- History
  - Established: late 18th century
  - Accession to the Indian Union: 1948
- Today part of: India

The Dedhrota is a village and a former princely state in Gujarat, India.

== History ==
Dedhrota was a sixth class jurisdictional princely state in the Sabar Kantha Thana in Mahi Kantha Agency ruled by jhala rajputs. It consisted of villages and a population of 725. Its annual revenue was Rs. 2,203 (equivalent to ₹958,686 in 2023) and it was a tributary to the Baroda State. It covered an area of 10 square miles (26 km^{2}).

=== Rulers ===
The rulers of Dedhrota bore the title of Thakur or Thakore.

- Thakur Shri Punjsinh (b. 1850)
- Thakur Shri Nathusinh Punjsinh
- Thakur Shri Daulatsinh Nathusinh (b. 1895, succeeded 1913)
- Thakur Shri Pratapsinh Daulatsinh (b. 1916, succeeded 1921, invested with power 1936)
- Thakur Shri Kishorsinh Daulatsinh (b. 1920)
- Thakur Shri Vikramsinh kishorsinh (b.1961)
