= Kapshi Jagir =

Coordinates: 16°20′03″N 74°17′10″E

Kapshi Estate
- Jagir
- Mid-17th century–1956
- Population
  - 1901: 3,414
- History
  - Established: Mid-17th century
  - Independence of India: 1956
Succeeded by
India

Kapshi Estate was a jagir in India during the British Raj. It was under the Kolhapur-Dekkan Residency in the Bombay Presidency, and later the Deccan States Agency.

The vassal state of Kapshi was located 62 kilometres (39 mi) south of Kolhapur. It had a population of 3,414 in 1901.

== History ==
The father of the founder of the estate was Shrimant Senapati Malojirao Ghorpade, who died in the battle of Sangmeshwar against the Mughals. A general of the Maratha army, he was granted the title 'Senapati', a hereditary title of nobility used in the Maratha Empire, and became the first ruler of Kapshi in the second half of the 17th century.

== See also ==
- Kolhapur State
- List of Indian princely states
