= Ghorasar =

Town in Ahmedabad district, Gujarat, India

Coordinates: 22°54′N 72°50′E

Ghorasar is a town in the Ahmedabad district of Gujarat, India.

== History ==
Ghorasar was a Fourth Class princely state and taluka, comprising fourteen more villages, covering sixteen square miles in Mahi Kantha.

It had a combined population of 6,291 in 1901, yielding a state revenue of 23,415 Rupees (just over half from land), paying tributes of 3,501 Rupees to the Gaikwar Baroda State and 488 Rupees to Kaira.

On 10 July 1943, Ghorasar ceased to exist, being among the princely states merging under the 'Attachment Scheme' into the Gaekwar Baroda State, following its fate into independent India's Bombay State and after its split from Gujarat.

== Sources and external links ==
General

- Imperial Gazetteer on DSAL - Mahi Kantha

Specific
