= Mudhol State =

Princely state of India (1398–1948)

Coordinates: 16°19′50″N 75°19′20″E

Mudhol State ಮುಧೋಳ ಸಂಸ್ಥಾನ
- Princely State of British India
- 1398–1948
- Flag

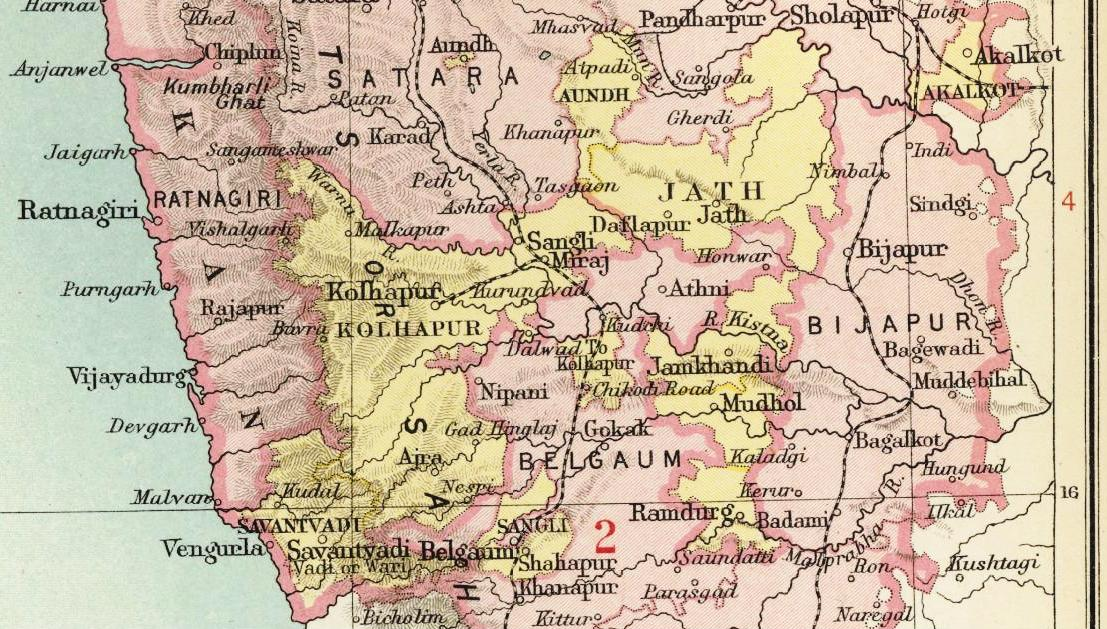
- Mudhol State in the Imperial Gazetteer of India
- Capital: Mudhol
- Area
  - 1931: 508 km^{2} (196 sq mi)
- Population
  - 1931: 936,218
- History
  - Established: 1398
  - Independence of India: 1948
Preceded by	Succeeded by
Maratha Empire	India
- Today part of: Karnataka, India
- Official language: Kannada

Mudhol State was a princely state during the British Raj. The rulers were from the Ghorpade Dynasty of the Marathas. It was one of the former states of the Southern Maratha Country and its capital was the city of Mudhol in present-day Bagalkote District of Karnataka State in India. The last ruler was HH Shrimant Raja Bhairavsinhrao Malojirao Ghorpade II. Mudhol acceded to the Dominion of India on 8 March 1948, and is currently a part of Karnataka state.

Covering an area of 508 km^{2} (196 sq mi), Mudhol State enjoyed revenue estimated at £20,000 in 1901. According to the 1901 census, the population was 63,001, with the population of the town itself at 8,359 in that year.

== History ==
The Mudhol jagir (estate) was founded ca 1400. Ruled by the Maratha Ghorpade Dynasty. In 1670, Mudhol estate became a state. It became a British protectorate in 1819. The state flag, called 'Bavuta', was a triangular tricolour of horizontal bands, in order from the top: white, black and green. All colour bands came to the point in the fly. Mudhol State was one of the 9-gun salute states of British India, under the summit of Niranjan.

Mudhol State's last king, HH Shrimant Raja Bhairavsinhrao Malojirao Ghorpade II, born 15 October 1929 and succeeded to the throne on 9 November 1937, was the 23rd Raja of Mudhol. He signed the accession to join the Indian Union on 8 March 1948. He died in 1984 in a car accident.

== Royal Titles ==
Role	Royal Title
The Ruling Prince	Raja Shrimant (personal name) Raje Ghorpade Bahadur, Raja of Mudhol, with the style of His Highness
The Consort of the Ruling Prince	Shrimant Sakal Soubhagyavati Rani (personal name) Raje Ghorpade, Rani of Mudhol, with the style of Her Highness
The Heir Apparent	Yuvraj Shrimant (personal name) Raje Sahib Ghorpade
The sons of the ruling prince	Rajkumar Shrimant (personal name) Raje Ghorpade
The unmarried daughters of the ruling prince	Rajkumari Shrimant (personal name) Raje Ghorpade
The married daughters of the ruling prince	Shrimant Sakal Soubhagyavati (personal name) Raje (husband's family name)
The other male descendant of the ruling prince (male line)	Shrimant (personal name) Raje Ghorpade

=== Rajas ===
- 1398 – 1408 Bhairav Singh Ghorpade (d. 1408)
- 1408 – 1424 Devraj Ghorpade
- 1424– 1454 Ugrasen Ghorpade (d. 1454)
- 1662 – 1700 Maloji Raje Ghorpade (d. 1700)
- 1700 – 1734 Sardar Akhayaji Raje Ghorpade (d. 1734)
- 1734 – 1737 Pirajirao Raje Ghorpade (d. 1737)
- 1737 – 1805 Malojirao III Raje Ghorpade (b. 1710 – d. 1805)
- 1805 – 1816 Narayanrao Raje Ghorpade (d. 1816)
- 1816 – 20 February 1818 Govindrao Raje Ghorpade (d. 1818)
- 20 Feb 1818 – Dec 1854 Vyankatrao I Raje Ghorpade (d. 1854)
- Dec 1854 – 27 March 1862 Balwantrao Raje Ghorpade (b. 1841 – d. 1862)
- 27 Mar 1862 – 19 June 1900 Vyankatrao II Raje Ghorpade (b. 1861 – d. 1900) "Bala Sahib"
- 27 Mar 1862 – 1882 .... -Regent
- 19 Jun 1900 – 14 November 1937 Malojirao IV Raje Ghorpade (b. 1884 – d. 1937) "Nana Sahib" (from 1 Jan *1920, Sir Malojirao IV Raje Ghorpade)
- 19 Jun 1900 – 1904 Council of Regency
- 14 Nov 1937 – 15 August 1947 Bhairavsinhrao Raje Ghorpade (b. 1929 – d. 1984)
- 14 Nov 1937 – 10 July 1947 Parvatidevi Raje Sahib – Ghorpade (f) -Regent

== Mudhol Hound ==
Shrimant Rajesaheb Malojirao Ghorpade of Mudhol (1884–1937) of the Mudhol State is credited with reviving the Mudhol hound. He noticed local tribal people using these hounds for hunting. Using selective breeding, he was able to restore the royal Mudhol hound. On a visit to England in the early 1900s, the Maharaja of Mudhol State presented King George V a pair of hounds, which popularized the Mudhol hound breed.

== See also ==
- Maratha
- Maratha Empire
- List of Maratha dynasties and states
- List of Indian princely states
