= Ramdurg State =

Coordinates: 15.95°N 75.3°E

- Princely State of British India
- 1799–1948
- Flag

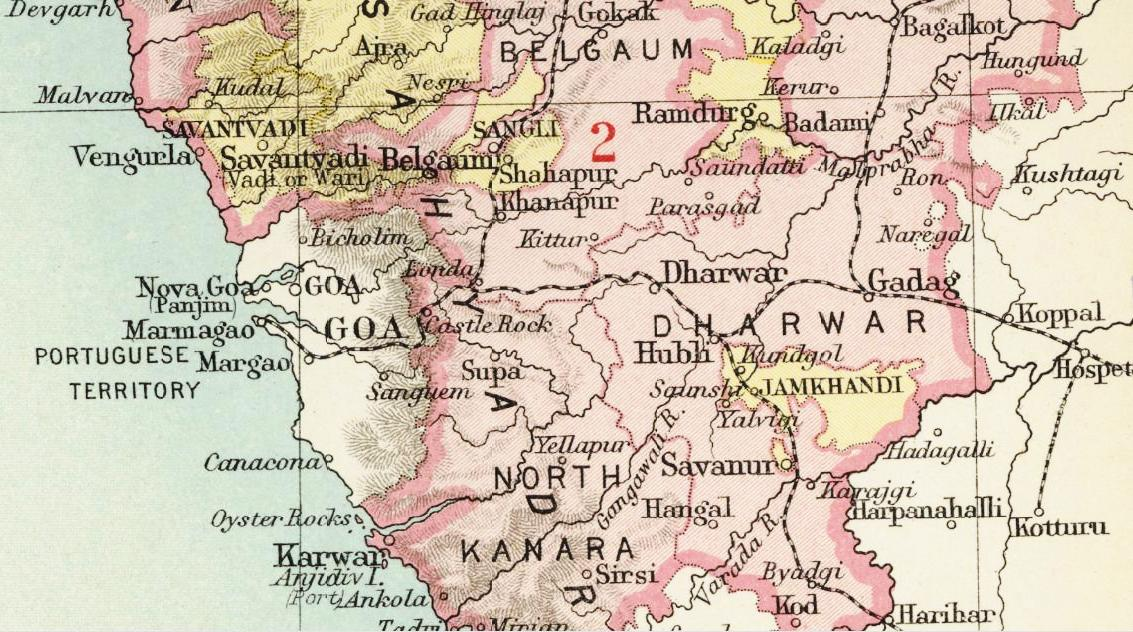
- Ramdurg State in the Imperial Gazetteer of India
- Area
  - 1901: 438 km^{2} (169 sq mi)
- Population
  - 1901: 37,848
- History
  - Established: 1799
  - Independence of India: 1948
Preceded by	Succeeded by
Maratha Empire	India

Ramdurg State was one of the Maratha princely states ruled by the Bhave family during the British Raj. It was administered as part of the Deccan States Agency of the Bombay Presidency, founded in 1799. It was one of the former states of the Southern Maratha Country and its capital was at Ramdurg.

Ramdurg State measured 438 square kilometers in area. According to the 1901 census, the population was 37,848.

== Gallery ==
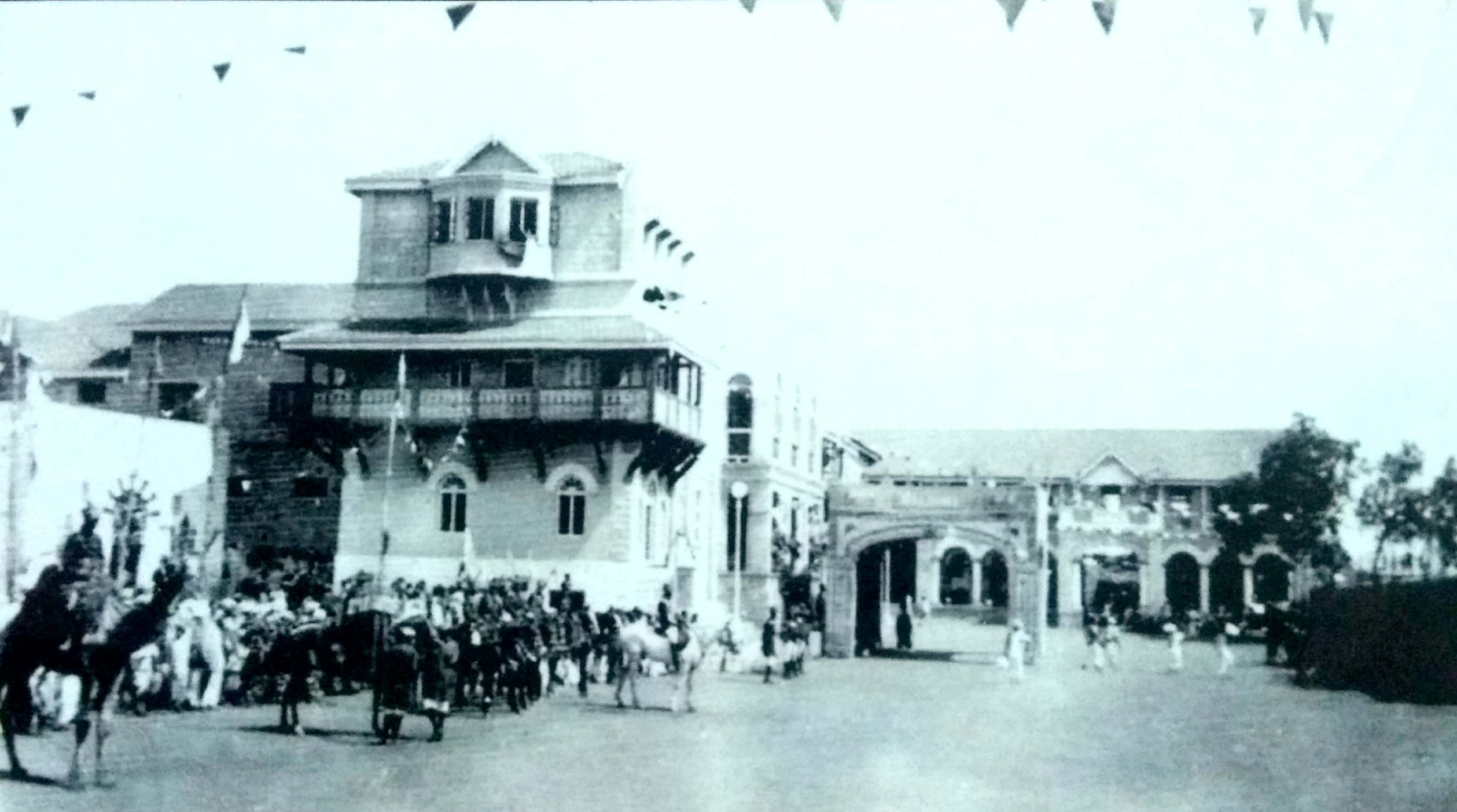
Ramdurg Palace

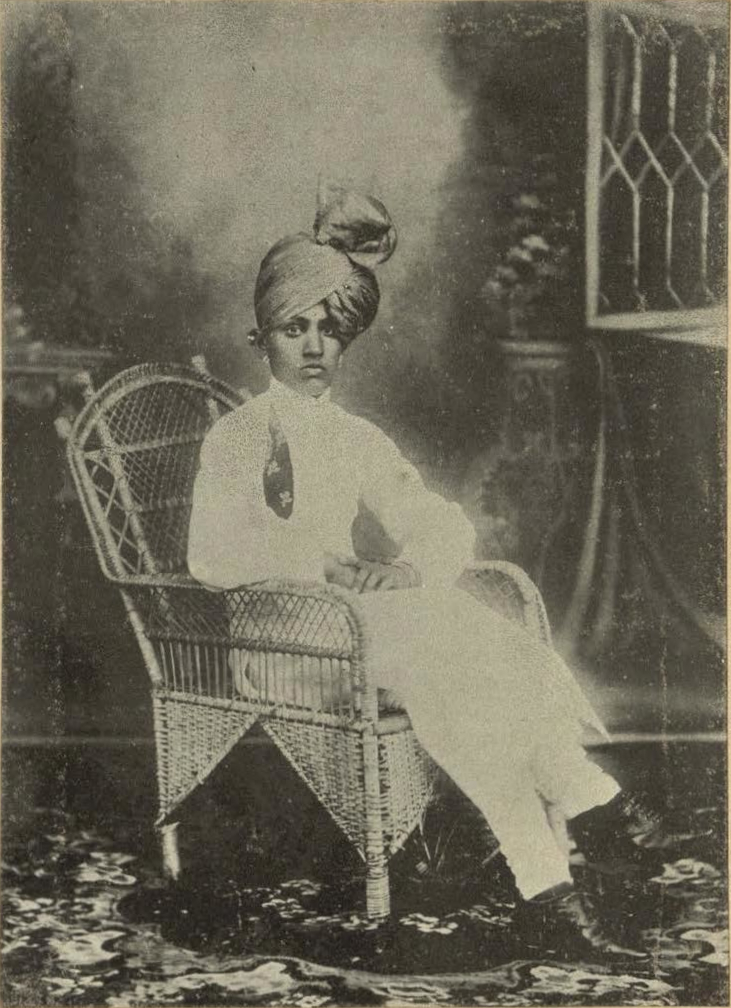
Ramrao Venkatrao Bhave in 1911, Last Ruler of Bhave State

== See also ==
- List of Maratha dynasties and states
- Political integration of India
