= Dabha, Gujarat =

Dabha
- Village
- Location within Gujarat
- Coordinates: 23.205214°N 73.102629°E
- Country: India
- District: Aravalli district

Population (2011)
  - Total: 1,058

Dabha is a town in the Aravalli district of Gujarat, in western India.

== History ==
Dabha was a princely state and taluka, comprising eight more villages, covering twelve square miles in Mahi Kantha.

It had a population of 1,307 in 1901, yielding a state revenue of 4,379 Rupees (mostly from land), paying tributes of 150 Rupees to the Gaikwar Baroda State and 53 Rupees to the nearby Amliyara State.
