= Vakhtapur (Mahi Kantha) =

Village and former princely state in India

Vakhtapur is a village in the Mehsana district of Gujarat, India.

== History ==
It was a minor princely state in the Mahi Kantha during colonial rule.

In 1901 it comprised the town and three other villages, with a combined population of 1,744, yielding 5,788 Rupees state revenue (1903–4, mostly from land), paying double tribute: 1,188 Rupees to the Gaekwar Baroda State and 486 Rupees to Idar State.
