= Ramas State =

Princely state in Mahi Kantha, Gujarat

Ramas is a town and former Princely statein Gujarat, India.

The village is in Bayad Taluka, in Aravalli district of Gujarat state, Western India.

== History ==
Ramas was a Sixth Class princely state and taluka, comprising eight more villages, covering six square miles in Mahi Kantha.

It had a combined population of 1650 in 1901 and generating a state revenue of 2500 Rupees and paying tributes of 158 Rupees to the Gaekwad Baroda State.

== Places of interest ==
There is a step-well said to have been built five hundred years ago by the wife of a Nawa of Kapadvanj.
