= Bolundra =

Bolundra બોલુન્દ્રા
- Village
- Country: India
- State: Gujarat
- District: Aravalli
- Elevation: 149 m (489 ft)

Population (2011)
  - Total: 2,139
- Time zone: UTC+5:30 (Indian Standard Time)
- Postal code: 383250
- Area code: 02774

Bolundra is a village, princely state and Taluka in Modasa, India. The village (Ta – Modasa) is in the Aravalli district in Gujarat state, western India, on the bank of the River Meshvo.

== History ==
The taluka was ranked a Sixth Class state, the lowest in the classification of the colonial Mahi Kantha Agency, and was ruled by Rajput chieftains. It covered six square miles, comprising five villages, and had a combined population in 1901 of 740, yielding a state revenue of 2,499 rupees (1903–4, mostly from land), paying a tribute of 134 rupees to Idar State.

== Rulers ==
The Rulers held the title of Thakur.

- Thakur Salamsinghji (b. ca 1865) fl. 1900
- Thakur Bhud Sinhji (b. September 7, 1895) May 8, 1900-fl. 1909
- Thakur Hindusinhji Sardarsinhji (b. 1888) November 5, 1913-fl. 1940
