= Hadol State =

Former Koli princely state

Koli Princely State of Hadol હડોલ
- Status: Annexed in India
- Capital: Hadol
- Common languages: Koli; Gujarati; English
- Ethnic groups: Koli; Patidar; Brahmin; Muslim
- Religion: Hindu; Muslim
- Demonym: Koli people
  - Dynasty: Makwana
  - Ruling family ethnicity: Koli

Area
  - Total: 69.93 km^{2} (27.00 sq mi)
- Today part of: Gujarat, India

The Hadol is a village and former non-salute princely state in Gujarat, Western India.

== History ==
The Sixth Class princely state and taluka, covering 27 sq mi (70 km^{2}) Mahi Kantha, was ruled by Kshatriya Makwana Koli. Hadol, Vakhat Sinh, Makwana Koli by caste, is the present Talukdar. He pays a tribute of Rs. 1,025-2-9 to the Gaekwad of Baroda and Rs 218 to the Idar State as Khichdi Hakka. The Talukdar is ranked among sixth class chiefs, so he enjoys civil and criminal powers as the Talukdar of Hadol. Residence - Hara, Mahi Kantha Agency: Bombay Presidency. Chieftains, who were 'non-jurisdictional' talukdars, the state being within the jurisdiction of Gadhwara thana.

In 1901, it comprised the nineteen villages, with a combined population of 2,665, yielding 3,983 Rupees state revenue (1903-1904, half from land), paying double tribute: 113 Rupees to the Gaikwar Baroda State and 41 to the Idar State.
