= Likhi State =

Former princely state

Likhi is a village and former non-salute princely state in Gujarat, western India.

== History ==
In 1901 it comprised the town and four other villages, with a combined population of 959, yielding 5,512 Rupees state revenue (1903–1904, mostly from land), paying no tribute.
