= Rupal State =

Town and former princely state in India

Rupal is a town and former princely state in Gujarat, western India.

== History ==
Rupal was a Fifth Class princely state, comprising twelve more villages, covering sixteen square miles in Mahi Kantha, It has been deprived of its jurisdiction as taluka due to maladministration.

It had a combined population of 3,113 in 1901, yielding a state revenue of 7,045 Rupees (1903–4, half from land), paying tributes of 1,165 Rupees to the Gaikwar Baroda State and 362 Rupees to Idar State.

== External links and sources ==
- Imperial Gazetteer on DSAL - Mahi Kantha
