= List of Maratha dynasties and states =

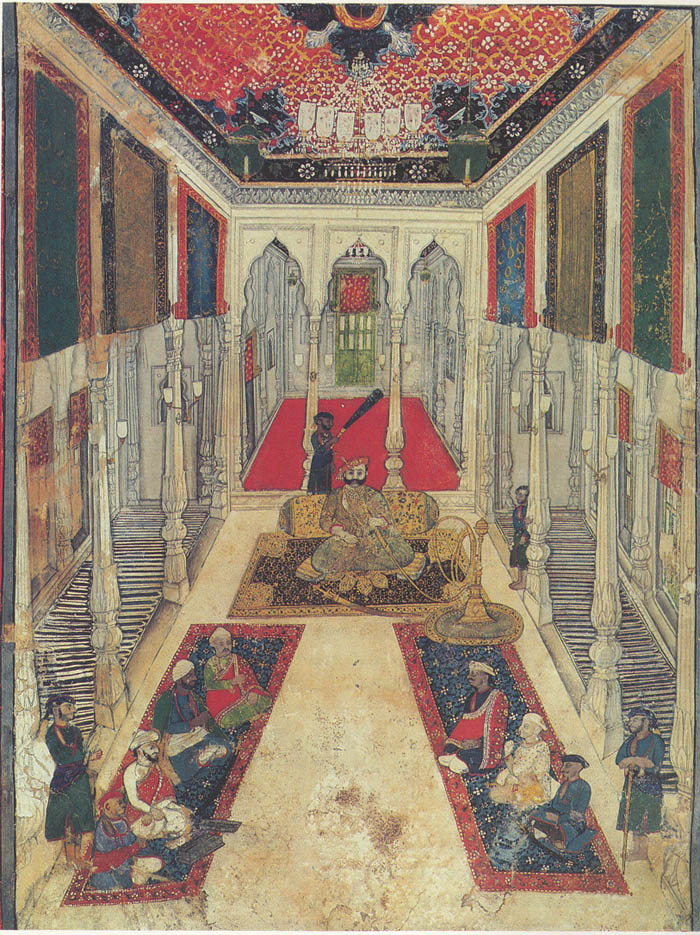
A Maratha Durbar showing the Chief (Raja) and the nobles (Sardars, Jagirdars, Istamuradars & Mankaris) of the state.

This is a list of Maratha dynasties and Maratha princely states in the Indian subcontinent.

== Maratha States ==
=== The Maratha Salute state and Head of State by precedence ===
- Baroda, title Maharaja Gaikwad, Hereditary salute of 21-guns
- Gwalior, title Maharaja Shinde, Hereditary salute of 21-guns
- Indore, title Maharaja Holkar, Hereditary salutes of 19-guns
- Kolhapur, title Maharaja Bhonsle Chhatrapati, Hereditary salutes of 19-guns
- Dewas State (1728–1948) of Pawar clan.
  - Dewas State Senior, title Maharaja, Hereditary salute of 15-guns
  - Dewas State Junior, title Maharaja, Hereditary salute of 15-guns
- Sangli, title Raja, Hereditary salute of 11-guns
- Bhor (Gandekar State), title Raja, Hereditary salute of 9-guns
- Jawhar State, title Maharaja, Hereditary salute of 9-guns
- Sawantwadi State, title Raja, Hereditary salute of 9-guns
- Mudhol State, title Raja, Hereditary salute of 9-guns

=== Non-salute states ===
Non-salute Maratha states, alphabetically:

- Akkalkot State, title Raja
- Aundh State, title Pant Pratinidhi
- Kolaba State, title Sarkhel (until the first half of the 18th century)
- Jamkhandi State, title Raja
- Jath State, title Raja
- Kurundvad Junior, title Rao
- Kurundwad Senior, title Rao
- Miraj Junior, title Rao Saheb Patwardhan
- Miraj Senior, title Rao Saheb Patwardhan
- Phaltan State, title Maharaj
- Surgana State, title Raja
- Ramdurg State, title Saheb
- Sandur State, title Raja

=== States Annexed by the British under the Doctrine of Lapse ===
- Nagpur State (1818–1853) – Annexed by the East India Company under the Doctrine of Lapse in 1853.
- Satara State – Abolished in 1848 by the East India Company under the Doctrine of Lapse.
- Thanjavur – Annexed by the East India Company under the Doctrine of Lapse.
- Jhansi State – Annexed by the East India Company under the Doctrine of Lapse; recaptured briefly by Rani Lakshmi Bai (4 June 1857 – 4/5 April 1858).
- Jalaun State - Annexed by the East India Company under the Doctrine of Lapse in 1840.

== See also ==
- List of Indian Princely States
- Maratha clan system
- Maratha Empire
- Maratha War of Independence
- Marathi people
