= Mahi Kantha Agency =

Agency of the British Raj

- Agency of British India
- 1820–1933
- Mahi Kantha Agency in Gujarat
- Capital: Sadra
- Area
  - 1901: 8,094 km^{2} (3,125 sq mi)
- Population
  - 1901: 361,545
- History
  - Established: 1820
  - Formation of the Western India States Agency: 1933
Succeeded by
Western India States Agency

Mahi Kantha was a political agency or collection of princely states in British India, within the Gujarat Division of Bombay Presidency. In 1933, the states of the Mahi Kantha Agency, except for Danta, were included in the Western India States Agency. The total area of the agency was 8,094 km^{2} (3,125 sq mi); the population in 1901 was 361,545.

== History ==
The states came within the British sphere of influence after the Second Anglo-Maratha War of 1803–1805. In 1811, when the Maratha power was declining, the British Government stipulated to collect and pay over to the ruler of Baroda the yearly tribute of the Mahi Kantha states. In 1820 they finally took over the management of the whole territory, agreeing to collect and pay over the tribute free of expense to Baroda, while Baroda was pledged not to send troops into the country, or in any way to interfere with the administration. After a few disturbances in the 1830s, in 1857-58 and 1867, peace remained unbroken in the region until 1881, when the Bhils of Pol rose against their chief and extorted from him a settlement of their claims.

== Successor jurisdictions ==
In 1933 the agencies of Mahi Kantha and Banas Kantha, known as Palanpur Agency until 1925, were merged. However Palanpur State was transferred to the Rajputana Agency and was thus not part of the newly created agency.

After the independence of India in 1947, the rulers of the Mahi Kantha states acceded to the Government of India, and the area was reorganized into districts of Bombay State. In 1960, Bombay State was split along linguistic lines, and the area of Mahi Kantha became part of the new state of Gujarat.

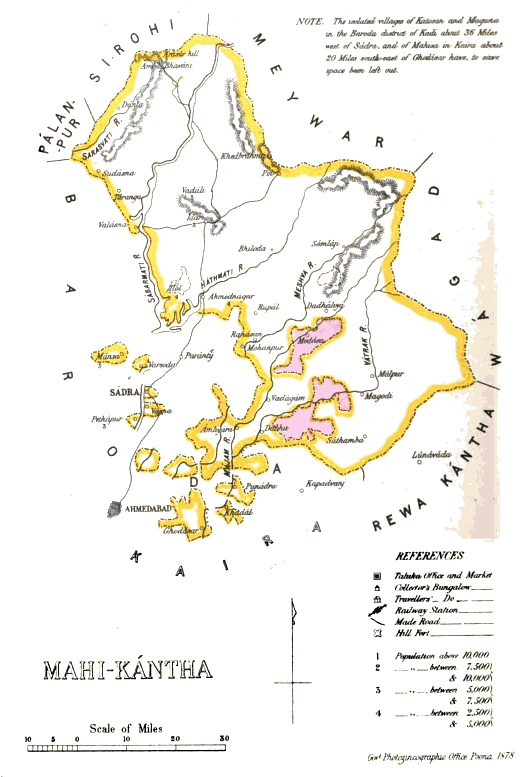
Mahi Kantha Agency, 1878

== List of Princely States ==
States and Thanas in Mahi Kantha Agency

The states were classified in the following manner:

=== Salute states ===
==== First Class state ====
- Idar (styled (Maha)Raja), a 15-guns salute state, covering over half of the territory of the agency.

==== Second Class state ====
- Danta (styled Maharana), an 11-guns salute state

=== Non-Salute states ===
==== Third Class states ====
- Malpur
- Mansa
- Mohanpur

==== Fourth Class states ====
- Ilol
- Ghodasar
- Katosan
- Khadal
- Pethapur
- Vallbhapur
- Ranasan
- Sudasna
- Varsoda
- Ambliara
- Antroli
- Moyad
- Vaghpur

==== Fifth Class states ====
- Dabha
- Dadhalia
- Ged
- Magodi
- Rupal
- Sathamba
- Tunadar
- Valasna
- Vasna (Wasna)
- Wadagam
- jher

==== Sixth Class states ====
- BhalusnaRAJPUT CHAUHAN PRESANT THAKUR RAJVIRSINGHJI PARMAVIRSINGHJI
- Pavthi ( Thakur Sahab Mulsinhji Vadansinhji)
- Bolundra
- Dedhrota
- Derol
- Hadol
- Hapa
- Kadoli
- Khedwada
- Likhi
- Prempur
- Ramas
- Satlasna
- Tajpuri
- Vakhtapur

==== Seventh Class states ====
- Deloli
- Gabat
- Ijpura
- Kasalpura
- Mahmadpura
- Palaj
- Rampura
- Ranipura
- Tejpuri
- Timba
- Umri
- Virsoda

== Estates ==
The agency included as well a large number of estates belonging to Rajput or Thakur saheb formerly feudatories of Baroda; several of the states paid tribute to Baroda, and some, being classed as non-jurisdictional thalukdars, were under British administration.
