= Mohanpur State =

Princely state of the British Raj

Coordinates: 23°27′N 73°4′E

Mohanpur State મોહનપુર
- Princely State of British India
- c.1227–1948
- Flag
- Area
  - 1881: 231 km^{2} (89 sq mi)
- Population
  - 1881: 14,667
- History
  - Established: c.1227
  - Union with Dominion of India: 10 June 1948
Succeeded by
Baroda State

Mohanpur State (Gujarati: મોહનપુર; Hindi: मोहनपुर) was a small princely state belonging to the Mahi Kantha Agency of the Bombay Presidency during the era of the British Raj Founder Of Mohanpur was Thkur harisinghji,brother of Tha. karsandasji Of Ghorwada state(Capital of Rahevar Rajput). It was centered on Mohanpur town, in present-day Sabarkantha district of Gujarat State, and included 52 villages.

== History ==
A predecessor state was founded around 1227 by an ancestor of the later kings named Thakore Jaspal, but its history is obscure.

Thakore Hindusinhji Pratapsinhji, originally from Sardoi, became the ruler of Mohanpur in 1795 and established the ruling lineage.

Although small in size, Mohanpur was not one of the small states that were merged with Baroda State under the Attachment Scheme in December 1943.

The last ruler was Vinaysinhji Sartansinhji who was born in 1909 and rose to the throne in 1927. He married and had issue. Thakur Vinaysinhji Sartansinhji signed the instrument of accession to the Dominion of India on 10 June 1948. He died on 9 December 1955.

=== Rulers ===
The rulers of Mohanpur State bore the title Thakur.

- 1793 – 1795 Vacant
- 1795 – 1801 Hindusinhji Pratapsinhji (From Sardoi)
- 1801 – 18.. Salamsinhji
- 18.. – 1850 Raisinhji
- 1850 – 1875 Dolatsinhji
- 1875 – 1882 Umedsinhji (b. 1854 – d. 1882)
- 6 Oct 1882 – 1916 Himmatsinhji (b. 1873 – d. 1916)
- 1882 – 1894 .... -Regent
- 1916 – 1927 Thakhatsinhji (b. 1861 – d. 19..)
- 1927 – 1947 Vinaysinhji Sartansinhji (b. 1909 – d. 1955)

== See also ==
- List of Rajput dynasties and states
- Baroda and Gujarat States Agency
- Political integration of India
