= Ranasan State =

Indian princely state

Coordinates: 23.35°N 72.95°E

Ranasan State (Parmars)
- Princely State of British India
- 17th century–1943
- Flag
- Capital: Talod
- Area
  - 1901: 78 km^{2} (30 sq mi)
- Population
  - 1901: 3,183
- History
  - Established: 17th century
  - Attachment Scheme and merger with Baroda State: 1943
Succeeded by
Baroda State
- Ranasan (Princely State)

The Ranasan State was a small princely state belonging to the Mahi Kantha Agency of the Bombay Presidency during the era of the British Raj. It had its capital in Ranasan village, Talod municipality, Sabarkantha district of present-day Gujarat State.

== History ==
The state was ruled by the Rehvar clan of the Hindu Parmar dynasty of Rajputs.

Ranasan State was merged with Baroda State under the Attachment Scheme on 10 July 1943. Finally, Baroda State acceded to the Indian Union on 1 May 1949.

=== Rulers ===
The rulers of Ranasan State bore the title 'Thakur'.

- .... – .... Rajsinhji
- .... – .... Sursinhji Rajsinhji
- .... – .... Garibdasji Surinhji
- .... – .... Adesinhji Garibdasji
- .... – 1768 Bharatsinhji Adesinhji
- 1768 – 1802 Khumansinhji Bharatsinhji (d. 1802)
- 1802 – 1828 Makansinhji Khumansinhji (d. 1828)
- 1828 – 18.. Raisinhji Makansinhji
- 18.. – 1879 Vajesinhji Sartansinhji (b. 1814 – d. 1879)
- 1879 – 1842 Lalsinhji Narsinhji
- 1842 – 18.. Sartansinhji Karansinhji
- 18..- 5 February 1890 Hamirsinhji Vajesinhji (d. 1890)
- 5 February 1890 – 28 April 1914 Kishorsihji Jiwatsinhji (b. 1869 – d. 1914)
- 28 Apr 1914 – 5 August 1917 Prathisinhji Fatehsinhji (b. 1881 – d. 1917)
- 5 August 1917 – 1938 Takhatsinhji Fatehsinhji (b. 1883 – d. 1938)
- 2 December 1938 – 1947 Jashwantsinhji Takhatsinhji (b. 1916 – d. 1964)

== See also ==
- List of Rajput dynasties and states
- Mahi Kantha Agency
