= Belgaum border dispute =

Border dispute between states of India

- Red corridor– Location of Belagavi district
Date	December 1983–present
Location	Belagavi district
Status	Ongoing as a low-level insurgency

Belligerents
Maharashtra: NCP; Shiv Sena	Karnataka: Karnataka Police

Casualties and losses
- 50 Kannada civilians injured

The Belgaum (Karnataka-Maharashtra) border dispute (or Belagavi border dispute) is a dispute between the Indian states of Karnataka and Maharashtra over the administration of the city of Belgaum and surrounding areas. During the British Raj, the region was part of the Bombay Presidency, a former colonial province that included western Maharashtra, north-western Karnataka, and much of Gujarat, and then became part of the short-lived Bombay State after Indian independence. As part of the States Reorganisation Act based on linguistic lines in 1956, Belgaum—because of its Kannada plurality—was incorporated into the newly formed state of Karnataka. Adjacent Marathi-speaking areas remained in Maharashtra. Currently, Belgaum is administered as part of the Belagavi district in Karnataka.

== History ==
=== Background ===
An 1881 census recorded a population of 864,014 residents in the Belgaum district. 556,397 (64.39 per cent) of them were Kannada speakers and 225,008 (26.04 per cent) spoke Marathi.

With the independence of India in 1947, the Belgaum district of the former Bombay Presidency became a part of Bombay State. In 1956, the States Reorganization Act incorporated the Belgaum district into the newly formed Mysore state (now Karnataka). This placed Belgaum, with its Marathi speakers, within the Kannada-majority Karnataka. Adjoining areas with mostly Marathi-speaking citizens were incorporated into a newly formed Maharashtra state.

=== Boundary Commission's decision ===
Belgaum historically has been a part of the Kannada region and has seen many Kannadiga dynasties ruling over it. The demographics of the region changed in the 18th century as in other parts of India. The period saw the expansion of the Maratha Empire under the Peshwa, culminating in its geographic spread memorialised as being from "Attock to Cuttack". A large chunk of the Karnataka region became a part of the empire and was called the "Southern Maratha Country" (comprising most of North Karnataka, with its vast majority of Kannada speakers). When the British came to power, the region was dotted by remnants of the Maratha empire ruling over their jagirs and feudal states. The language of the land essentially remained Kannada. The prevailing situation was summed up by John Faithfull Fleet in The Dynasties of the Kanarese Districts of the Bombay Presidency (1894), which forms a part of the Gazetteer of the Bombay Presidency (Vol-1, Part-II, Book-III) thus:

In defining the limits of the Kanarese language, on the west and north may be designated "by a line drawn from Sadashivgad (Karwar), westward of Belgaum, Hukkeri through Kagal and Kurundwad, passing between 'Keligaon' and 'Pandegaon' through Brahmapuri on Bhima and Solapur and thence east, to the neighbourhood of Bidar. This however wrongly excludes Kolhapur. As for Sholapur, which now officially counts as a Marathi District, Kanarese is still, to a great extent the vernacular of south east corner of it. And there are Kanarese inscriptions of the Western Chalukyas, Kalachurya and Devagiri Yadavas of the twelfth and thirteenth centuries and some later ones, at Sholapur itself, and at Kudal and Mohol in that district, and at Karajgi, Kudal, and Tadwal in the Akalkot state.

...In official language the four recognised Kanarese districts of this presidency viz. Belgaum, Bijapur and Dharwar collectorates together with the Kolhapur, Miraj and other Native states called the "Southern Maratha Country". A more misleading appellation, however it originated, could not well have been devised. It is true that, in one of the earliest inscriptions of Pulakesin II, this part of the country is included in what was known then and even many centuries before his time as Maharashtra. But this term meaning literally "the great country", does not inherently imply any of the racial and linguistic peculiarities which are now naturally attached to the terms 'Maratha' and 'Marathi', derived from it. In the whole area of so-called Southern Maratha country, not a single Marathi inscription has been discovered, of a greater age than two or three centuries. With the exception that two Prakrit records have been obtained at Banawasi in North Kanara and 'Malavalli' in Mysore, and that a few Prakrit words occur here and there in other records, the inscriptions are all either in pure Sanskrit or pure Kanarese, or in the two languages combined. This fact speaks of itself, as to what the vernacular of the country was in early times. In the present day, the people and the language of British districts are essentially Kanarese; and the Kanarese people and language have been displaced, to a certain extent, by the Marathi people and language in the Native States, only because those States were established by the aggressions of the Marathas from the north, whose local influence proved to be greater than that of the native rulers whom they dispossessed. Even in the Native States, and in Marathi official correspondence, the Political Agent at Kolhapur is, to the present day always addressed as the Political Agent, not of the "Dakshina Maharashtra" or "Southern Maratha Country, but of the "Karavira Ilakha and the Karnataka Prant.

.

This was the background available on Belgaum to the commission that decided the linguistic reorganisation of Indian states. As a result, Maharashtra didn't include the 'Maratha'-ruled areas of Baroda, Indore or Gwalior except for Kolhapur, as the Commission considered the historical changes in the region and not just recent changes in demography.

=== Four member committee ===
Following a memorandum from the Maharashtra government on 23 June 1957, the Government of India constituted the Mahajan Committee on 5 June 1960 to decide on the reorganisation of Belgaum. The four member Committee consisted of two representatives from the Maharashtra government and two from the Mysore government. However, it failed to reach an agreement. Maharashtra wanted to adopt the following principles, and agreed to hand over Kannada majority villages to Mysore:

1. Villages as a unit
2. Geographical proximity/integrity
3. Marathi or Kannada speakers "relative majority"; villages with no population should be merged with that state where the owners of that land reside
4. The wish of the residents

The Mysore government, on the other hand, wanted status quo to be maintained.

=== Mahajan Commission ===
Maharashtra leader Senapati Bapat resorted to a hunger strike demanding that the government form a commission to address the border dispute. At Maharashtra's insistence, the Government of India constituted the Mahajan Commission on 25 October 1966. V.P. Naik, Maharashtra's Chief Minister at that time, announced on 9 November 1967 that Maharashtra will adhere to the Mahajan Commission's report, regardless of the outcome. The commission was headed by the third Chief Justice of the Supreme Court of India, Meher Chand Mahajan. The commission, upon review of Maharashtra's claims, recommended the exchange of several villages in Belgaum district between the two states, but rejected Maharashtra's claim on Belgaum city.

The Mahajan Commission received 2,240 memoranda and interviewed 7,572 people before submitting its report. Maharashtra had asked for 814 villages besides Belgaum. It was given 262 villages including Nippani, Khanapur and Nandgad. Mysore State had claimed 516 villages, of which Maharashtra admitted that 260 were Kannada-speaking ones. It was awarded 247 villages including claim to Solapur.

==== Excerpts of the Mahajan Report ====
Excerpts from the Mahajan Commission report regarding the rejection of Maharashtra's claim over Belgaum:

Maharashtra's claim for Belgaum is of recent origin. Though tabled in Parliament, Maharashtra MPs, especially from the treasury benches, did not vote against the amendment of Belgaum being part of their state. Belgaum is a cosmopolitan city. In 1920, when the AICC session was held in Belgaum, not a single leader from Maharashtra including N C Kelkar demanded that it be part of that state. Geographically, Kannada areas surround the city of Belgaum on three sides and by a smattering of villages belonging to Maharashtra on the fourth. Reorganisation will cause extreme hardship. Status quo should be maintained. From the records of rights of Belgaum city, it is seen that a majority of lands belong to Kannadigas. All the original records in the offices of the mamlatdar and collector are in Kannada. "On the appreciation of the whole material and assessing it objectively, I have reached the conclusion that I cannot recommend the inclusion of Belgaum city in the state of Maharashtra.

The Mahajan commission report summarised its recommendations thus:

1. Belgaum to continue in Karnataka
2. Around 247 villages/places including Jatta, Akkalakote and Sholapur to be part of Karnataka
3. Around 264 villages/places including Nandagad, Nippani and Khanapur to be part of Maharashtra
4. Kasaragod (of Kerala) to be part of Karnataka

The Maharashtra and Kerala government rejected these recommendations and demanded their review. The Maharashtra government termed the findings of the reports biased and self-contradictory because the "formula" applied for Kasaragod was not applied for Belgaum. It insisted that the report is against the "wish of the people" of Belgaum. Kerala, on the other hand, refused to hand over Kasaragod to Karnataka. The Karnataka government continued to press for either the implementation of the report or the maintenance of status quo.

==== Maharashtra's arguments against the report ====
Maharashtra insisted on the 1951 census being used to resolve the dispute as it had arisen due to the States Reorganisation Act of 1956. According to the 1951 census the percentages of Marathi-speakers (with Kannada-speakers in brackets) were as follows:

- Belgaum city: 60% (18.8%)
- Shahapura: 57.0% (33.2%)
- Belgaum cantonment: 33.6% (20.6%)
- Belgaum suburbs: 50.9% (21.8%)

The Mahajan commission, however, used the census of 1961, according to which Belgaum was surrounded by Kannada speaking areas on all sides. The commission said that its decisions on border dispute were not based on the number of Marathi schools and students in Belgaum.

Political leaders in Maharashtra insisted that the Mahajan Commission report was not the final word on the dispute and Shiv Sena leader Ramdas Kadam claimed that even ex-prime minister Rajiv Gandhi had said so. The Maharashtra Government rejected the Mahajan Commission's report claiming that it was biased, illogical and against the wishes of the people.

=== Emergence of the Maharashtra Ekikaran Samiti ===
The Maharashtra Ekikaran Samiti (MES) was founded in 1948 with the sole objective of ensuring that Belgaum becomes part of Maharashtra.

== List of disputed Village's ==
1. Belgaum district-
2. Karwar district-
3. Bidar district-

== 1980s and 1990s ==
The first Belgaum City Corporation (BCC) elections were held in December 1983. The MES-dominated BCC made demands for the transfer of Belgaum to Maharashtra in 1990, 1996 and 2001. More than 250 MES-dominated gram and taluk panchayats, and some other municipalities (such as neighbouring Khanapur) passed similar resolutions. In 1986, the dispute led to violence and large-scale arson, resulting in nine deaths in Belgaum.

During H.D. Deve Gowda's tenure as Chief Minister of Karnataka (1994–96), the Karnataka organisation, Kannada Cheluvarigara Sangha, submitted a memorandum to the Karnataka Government, asking it to set up large industries in the region to provide employment to 20,000-30,000 people.

Pro-Marathi groups protested against government notices and records not being available in Marathi. The Officials Language Act, 1963 and 1981, states that "areas where the linguistic minorities constitute 15 per cent or more of the local population, arrangements have to be made to translate government circulars, orders, extracts and land records into the minority language". In a letter (DO No RB Kannada CR 09/2000-01), Belgaum's Deputy Commissioner, Shalini Rajneesh reasoned that while suitable instructions had been given to the local authorities for the translation of documents into Marathi, it did not happen because the staff was "overloaded with the basic work to be carried out in the official language, that is, Kannada".

== 2005-2007 ==
=== BCC's 2005 resolution ===
On 27 October 2005, the MES-controlled BCC, amidst strong opposition by the Indian National Congress, Bharatiya Janata Party (BJP) and few independents, passed a resolution requesting the Karnataka State government and the Supreme Court of India to merge the disputed border areas in the districts of Belgaum (including Khanapura, Nippani and Belgaum city), Uttara Kannada (including Karwar and Haliyal) and Bidar (including Bhalki, Aurad and Basavakalyan) with Maharashtra. The entire opposition, including Congress, BJP and a few independents, boycotted the meeting. The meeting also witnessed intense verbal clashes between the MES and the opposition. Assistant Executive Officer, N.D. Achanur advised MES members not to pass a resolution against the interest of the state. When MES members refused to heed his advice, the officer walked out of the office. The officials of various departments present to provide details of their departments also walked out.

Some members of Karnataka group called Kannada Rakshana Vedike manhandled the BCC mayor Vijay More, former mayor Shivaji Sunthakar and former legislator B I Patil, outside the Karnataka Legislators' Home in Bangalore. The attackers tore Vijay More's shirt and daubed him with black paint.

On 10 November, the Mayor was served with a showcause notice by the Karnataka Government asking why the resolution should not be cancelled under Section 98 and 99 of the KMC Act. On 17 November, the government cancelled the resolution, without waiting for the Mayor's reply. On 17 November, it served another notice that sought an explanation from the Mayor as to why the BCC should not be dissolved under Section 99 of the KMC Act.

On 19 November, T N Chaturvedi, the Governor of Karnataka, criticised BCC during a public function. A group of Kannada organisations set 22 November as the deadline for dissolving BCC and threatened to call a statewide bandh on 24 November. On 21 November 2005, the Karnataka government dissolved the council, under pressure from Kannada activists, citing the violation of Section 18 of the KMC Act.

The MES secretary, Maloji Astekar, insisted that the BCC resolution was in accordance with the provisions of the KMC Act, 1976, and Fundamental Rights enshrined under Article 19(1) of the Constitution of India. He accused the Karnataka Government of "step-motherly treatment". The legal team of MES pointed out that both the cancellation of the resolution and the dissolution of the council were done without giving 15 days' time as was stipulated in the notice to enable the Mayor to submit his explanations. MES called a bandh in protest. A delegation of MES leaders visited Mumbai and met Maharashtra leaders, including Chief Minister Vilasrao Deshmukh. Deshmukh wrote letters to Karnataka Chief Minister N. Dharam Singh and Prime Minister Dr. Manmohan Singh expressing displeasure over the action taken against the BCC.

The former mayor of Belgaum, Vijay More, a Dalit, broke down in front of the media in Mumbai while describing the atrocities perpetrated on him by 30 Kannada fanatics in front of the Vidhana Soudha in Bengaluru. Vasant Patil, former Belgaum MLA, claimed that for the past several decades the Marathi-speaking population of Belgaum (population 5 lakh) had endured a host of atrocities by successive governments of Karnataka. "But we are determined to get justice", he added.

==== MES's legal challenge to the dissolution ====
After the MES-headed Belgaum City Corporation (BCC) was dissolved, the MES said that it would challenge the move in the Karnataka High Court, claiming that it discriminated against Marathi-speaking people. The MES had 49 corporators in the 58-strong civic body. The BCC was dissolved on several grounds, including passing a resolution seeking merger of Marathi-speaking areas in the border district with Maharashtra. Pre-empting the MES move, the Karnataka Government filed a caveat in the High Court, requesting it not to pass any order without hearing its counsel. The MES said that the government was hasty in taking such a decision when the state boundary case was still pending in the Supreme Court. MES working president Deepak Dalvi alleged that they "were being treated like slaves and hence will go to the High Court for justice" and the state government's action was "an assault on democracy". "A civic body elected by the people of Belagavi has been dissolved in an undemocratic manner. The unilateral decision has once again exposed the government's step-motherly treatment of Marathi-speaking people of Belagavi district", he added.

No developments on this particular litigation have been reported since its announcement.

==== MES changes stance ====
Fearing the dissolution of Belgaum taluk panchayat, the MES changed its stance and told the government that it had 'just discussed the issue and not passed a resolution'. All 22 members who were issued showcause notices provided the same response to the government notice. The members also asked the government not to take any action, including termination of the elected body.

=== Maharashtra's petition in the Supreme Court ===
In December 2005, attempts were also made by the Congress-led government at the centre to re-initiate discussions on the dispute between the Chief Ministers of Maharashtra and Karnataka and the Prime Minister Manmohan Singh. This effort proved futile as Karnataka continued to press for the implementation of the report and Maharashtra continued to stake its claim on Belgaum City and a few other parts of Karnataka.

Finally, on 15 March 2006, the Maharashtra government filed a petition in the Supreme Court of India, staking a claim over Belgaum City. It cited "the feeling of insecurity among the Marathi speaking people living in Karnataka, in the recent days". Belgaum district along with Belgaum city continues to be a part of Karnataka state while Maharashtra awaits the Supreme Court's verdict.

=== 2006 developments ===
==== Maharashtra demands that the border region be brought under the centre's rule ====
Maharashtra asked that the 865 disputed villages including Belgaum be placed under the central government's rule until the Supreme Court's final verdict. N.D Patil, the head of the legal committee appointed by the Maharashtra government, said that Karnataka is intensifying the problem. He added that Marathi people of border region are not able to live with honour and dignity under Karnataka's rule pointing to the 'unconstitutional' dissolution of Belgaum municipal council and manhandling of Belgaum mayor by Kannada activists in Bengaluru.

==== Karnataka Government's Assembly session ====
On 25 September 2006, amidst vociferous protests by MES, the Karnataka state government convened a five-day Assembly session, for the first time outside capital Bengaluru, in Belgaum to assert its hold over the city.

The Karnataka Government declared that Belgaum will be made Karnataka's second capital but subsequently Karnataka home minister denied it. The Chief Minister H D Kumaraswamy declared that the joint legislative session will be held every year in Belgaum, and a mini Vidhana Soudha (state secretariat) will be built in the city.

The Houses unanimously adopted a resolution, endorsing the Mahajan Commission report which declared Belgaum a part of Karnataka. This was the fifth time that Karnataka has passed such a resolution, the first being in 1967 when S Nijalingappa was the CM.

The Congress, the opposition party at the time, dubbed the Belgaum session "a gimmick and a waste of funds". Ironically, the decision to hold the legislative session at Belgaum was taken by the previous Dharam Singh government, when Congress was in power.

==== MES Mahamelava ====
On the same day that the Karnataka Assembly session convened in Belgaum, the MES organised a mahamelava ("The Great Meet-up"), which received a huge response. The mahamelava was attended by the Maharashtra deputy Chief Minister, R. R. Patil and many leaders from Shiv Sena, NCP and MES. Speaking to a gathering of about 50,000 people, R.R. Patil stated that if Belgaum and other Marathi-speaking areas were not merged with Maharashtra there would be no alternative but to take to the streets. R R Patil said that "public opinion cannot be changed by using police force. Never in world history has anyone been able to change public opinion through use of force". The convention was intended to send a strong message "to all concerned" that the 10 crore people of Maharashtra were with the Marathi-speaking populace of the border areas in their "struggle". The leaders ridiculed the Karnataka Government's assembly session and vowed to merge Belgaum and adjoining areas into Maharashtra.

The Karnataka Government condemned R R Patil's address. It announced that Belgaum (Belgaon in Marathi) will be renamed to Belagavi.

==== Karnataka bandh ====
Karnataka Border Agitation Committee, an umbrella body of pro-Kannada outfits, called a statewide bandh in Karnataka in October 2006 to press for the implementation of Mahajan Commission report and to protest what the organisers called "step-motherly" treatment of the state by the centre. The Karnataka Chief Minister H D Kumaraswamy's appeal to call off the bandh was turned down by the organizers. BJP and JD(S), the ruling coalition partners in Karnataka extended their support to the bandh. The bandh affected normal life in Bengaluru and other parts of Karnataka.

The bandh was total in most parts of Karnataka except coastal districts and Tumakuru. In Bangalore, the bandh was total and incident free. Information technology and BPO industries in Bangalore closed their facilities for the day, especially due to non-availability of public transport and disruption of traffic by activists supporting the bandh. Kannada Rakshana Vedike members allegedly tore Marathi signboards and saffron flags and forced the residents of Belgaum to close their businesses. MES alleged that the Karnataka bandh was backed by Karnataka Police. Karnataka Police later arrested many Marathi residents, who expressed displeasure as the police did not take action against Kannada chauvinists. Maharashtra home minister R.R.Patil warned that torture against Marathi speakers would result in an equivalent response by them.

==== Yuvamelava ====
Maharashtra Ekikaran Samiti organised a youth convention at Khanapura on 26 October 2006. It was well received and attended by Maharashtra's leader of opposition, Ramdas Kadam and state minister, Hassan Mushrif. Marathi residents in the border region once again resolved to merge with Maharashtra. Kadam warned Karnataka that atrocities against Maharashtrians will result in a similar response against Kannadigas in Maharashtra.

MES leaders said the success of mahamelava forced Karnataka to cancel its decision to make Belgaum the second capital. The situation was tense in Khanapura because of the violence that erupted when MES activists tried to remove Kannada boards from shops. The posters and boards Marathi youth were carrying in the name of the Melava portrayed Kannadigas in poor light. Violence was sparked when attendants clashed with police during the event. Police had to resort to lathis and shells to disperse the mob when the youth pelted stones at police. More than 50 people were injured and about 25 vehicles were damaged. Police allegedly went from house to house to search for and book miscreants. MES activists tried to set buses on fire on two occasions, and threw stones at people and shops. The situation was also tense in Macche and Ganebail near Belgaum as some pro-Maharashtrians hurled stones at the vehicles coming from Khanapura. The police beat up participants in MES Yuvamelava and arrested MES leaders and Marathi speakers to ensure a peaceful 'Rajyotsava day' which MES planned to mark as a "Black Day".

The police department framed charges against Ramdas Kadam, opposition leader of Maharashtra assembly and several other Marathi leaders for making inflammatory speeches against Karnataka and Kannadigas at the Yuva Melava. The police booked cases against Ramdas Kadam under section 153, 153(A), Indian Penal Code (IPC), which would put Kadam in jail for 3 years if convicted. Similar charges were framed against Nitin B Patil from Satara. As many as 85 people responsible for violence including MES working president Deepak Dalvi, were sent to 14-day judicial custody.

=== Hearing of the Supreme Court ===
The Supreme Court began its hearing on Maharashtra's petition on 17 January 2007.

== Recent (2022- ) ==
In December 2022, Union Minister of Home Affairs, Amit Shah held meeting with both State's Chief Ministers. Both states agreed to form joint panel to see the issue. The Joint panel included 6 observing ministers (3 from each state).

While a separate committee headed by an IAS officer will monitor law and order in the district.

On 27 December 2022, Maharashtra Legislative Assembly passed a unanimous resolution over border dispute with Karnataka. The resolution includes Belgaum, Nippani, Karwar, Bidar, Bhalki cities with 865 Marathi-speaking villages of Karnataka to be part of Maharashtra and for this Maharashtra Government will pursuit legal proceedings in Supreme Court.

On Friday (February 21, 2025), NWKRTC bus conductor was assaulted after he asked a passenger to speak in Kannada. According to the police, the passenger in question, a college student, is a minor girl. The driver of the bus was also assaulted. The incident led to disruption in bus services between Karnataka and Maharashtra, with Kannada outfits in Karnataka and Shiv Sena activists on the Maharashtra side of the border protesting.
