= Lists of princely states of India =

List of states

The following lists of princely states of (British) India have been compiled:

- Flags of Indian princely states
- List of princely states of British India (alphabetical)
- List of princely states of British India (by region)
