= Akkalkot State =

Princely state in British India (1848–1947)

Coordinates: 17.5223064°N 76.2048938°E

- 1848–1947
- Flag

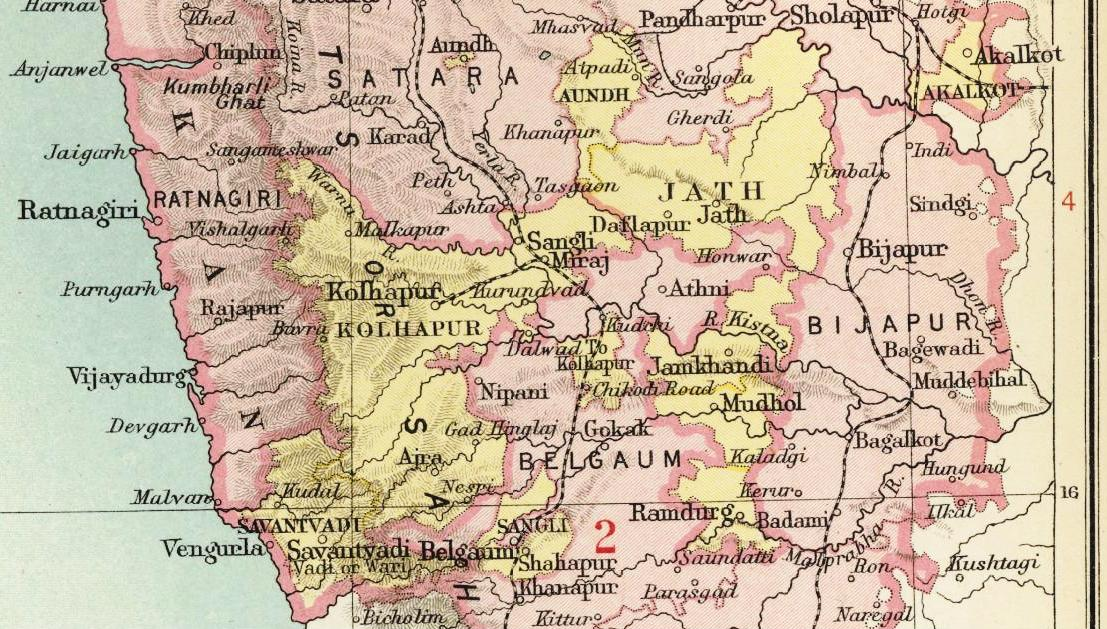
- Akkalkot State in the Imperial Gazetteer of India
- History
  - Established: 1848
  - British suzerainty ended: August 15, 1947

Area
- 1901: 1,290 km^{2} (500 sq mi)

Population
  - 1901: 82,047
| Preceded by | Succeeded by |
| Maratha Empire | Dominion of India |
- Today part of: Maharashtra, Republic of India

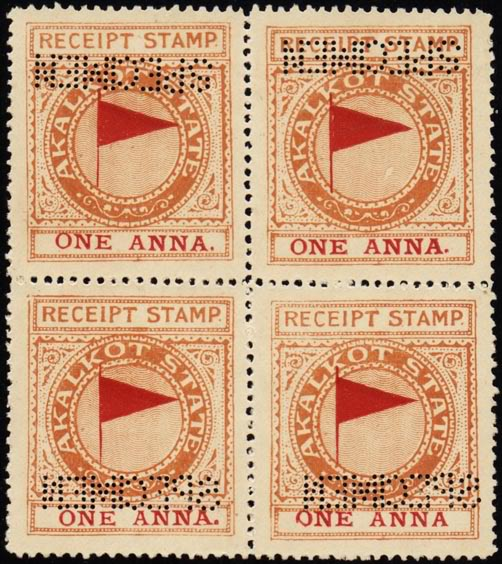
Specimen receipt stamps from Akalkot State

Akkalkot State during the British Raj, was a Maratha princely state ruled by the Bhonsle dynasty. The non-salute state came under the Deccan States Agency and was bordered by Hyderabad State and the Bombay Presidency.

The area of the state was 1,290 square kilometres (500 sq mi); its population in 1901 was 82,047, while the population of Akkalkot town itself was 8,348 in that year. In 1911, the state enjoyed a revenue estimated at Rs.26,586/- and paid a tribute to the British Raj of Rs.1,000/-.

== History ==
The ruling dynasty were descendants of Fatehsinh Bhonsle, who was adopted by Chhattrapati Shahu, grandson of Chhattrapati Shivaji, around the year 1708. Upon his adoption, Ranoji assumed the name 'Fatehsinh Bhonsle' and received in appenage the town of Akkalkot and surrounding areas. These estates remained a fief within the state of Satara until 1848, when the rulers of Satara (Chhatrapati Shahu's designated successors) were deposed by the British. Akkalkot then became one of several vassals of Satara to be recognised as separate princely states by the British Raj. The political history of the state is remarkable in having been altogether free of major incident. However, given their stability and association (by adoption) with the dynasty of Chhattrapati Shivaji, the family came to be linked by marriage to nearly every major Maratha ruling family in India.

Upon the termination of British rule in India in 1947, Akkalkot state acceded unto the Dominion of India, and was later merged with Bombay Presidency. Nirmalaraje Bhonsle, wife of Vijayasinhrao Bhonsle and a princess of Baroda by birth, served as Minister for States in the government of Bombay.

=== Rulers ===
The ruling chiefs of Akkalkot were:

1. 1707-1760 Fatehsinh I Raje Bhonsle (born Ranoji Lokhande)
2. 1760-1789 Shahaji I (Bala Sahib) Raje Bhonsle (nephew and adopted son of Fatehsinh I)
3. 1789-1822 Fatehsinh II (Aba Sahib) Raje Bhonsle (son of predecessor)
4. 1822-1823 Maloji I (Baba Sahib) Raje Bhonsle (son of predecessor)
5. 1823-1857 Shahaji II (Appa Sahib) Raje Bhonsle (son of predecessor)
6. 1857-1870 Maloji II (Buwa Sahib) Raje Bhonsle (son of predecessor)
7. 1870-1896 Shahaji III (Baba Sahib) Raje Bhonsle (son of predecessor)
8. 1896-1923 Cpt. Fatehsinhrao III Raje Bhonsle (adopted by his predecessor, born a patrilineal descendant of Shahaji I)
9. 1915-1952 Vijayasinhrao Fatehsinhrao III Raje Bhonsle (elder son of Fatehsinhrao III)
10. 1952-1965 Jayasinhrao Fatehsinhrao III Raje Bhonsle (younger son of Fatehsinhrao III)
  1965 onwards: Regency of Sanyuktaraje Jayasinhrao Bhonsle, elder daughter of Jayasinhrao. She has adopted Malojiraje III Sanyuktaraje Bhonsle, a patrilineal descendant of Shahaji I, as the legal heir to Akalkot state.
11. Malojiraje III Sanyuktaraje Bhonsle, adopted heir of his predecessor

== See also ==
- Maratha Empire
- List of Maratha dynasties and states
- List of Indian princely states
