= Asad Ali Khan Bahadur =

Nawab of Chenchelimala

Nawab Sayyid Asad Ali Khan Bahadur was Nawab of Chenchelimala between 1765 and 1791. He was son of Sayyid Muhammad Ali Khan Naqdi who was acted as Nawab of Banganapalle and Chenchelimala for Nawab Fazl Ali Khan III Bahadur.

== Life ==
He was granted Chenchelimala in jagir, before 20 June 1765. He was guardian to his young nephew (Nawab Sayyid Ghulam Muhammad Ali Khan I Bahadur), before 26 November 1783. He fled to Hyderabad with his young nephews when Hyder Ali invaded, before 14 November 1784. He entered the Nizam's service and appointed to a mansab of 800 sowar. He succeeded in defeating Tipu's forces under Muhammad Yusuf and Kutb ud-din at the battle of Tammadapalle, before 21 September 1789. He got wounded in battle with the Marathas at Kurdhla in 1794. He married a sister-in-law of Nawab Sayyid Ghulam Muhammad Ali Khan I Bahadur, Jagirdar of Banganapalle.

He married his daughter to Nawab Sayyid Ghulam Muhammad Ali Khan I Bahadur and his jagir as a gift to him in 1791.

== Titles held ==
Asad Ali Khan Bahadur Naqdi dynasty
Preceded by Nawab Faiz Ali Khan Bahadur	Jagirdar of Chenchelimala; 20 June 1765 – 31 August 1791	Succeeded by Nawab Sayyid Ghulam Muhammad Ali Khan I Bahadur

== See also ==
- Nawab of Carnatic
- Nawab of Masulipatam
- Nawab of Banganapalle
