= Beg Khan =

Beg Khan, or Bekkhan among the Muslim areas of Russia, is a concatenation of Baig, and Khan titles originally used in Central Asia and the Middle East to indicate nobility or high rank. It is used as part of the name or title by the following:

- Öz Beg Khan, the longest-reigning khan of the Golden Horde
- Muhammad Beg Khan-e Rosebahani, the Qiladar and Jagirdar of Banganapalle.
- Al-sultana al-radila Sati Beg Khan Khallad Allah Mulkaha, a claimant to the throne of the Ilkhanate during the fragmentation of Persia in the mid-14th century
- Bedr Khan Beg, the last emir and mutesellim of Cizre Bohtan Emirate
- Tardi Beg Khan, a military commander in the 16th century in Mughal India.
- Janybek Khan, a co-leader of a new Kazakh Khanate.
- Hussain Quli Beg, a Mughal general with the rank of 5000. He was entitled as Khan-i-Jahan.
- Shadi Beg, a Khan of the Golden Horde (1399–1407) and a son of Timur-Malik.
- Faiz Ali Khan, a ruler of the princely state of Banganapalle.
- Mohammad Murad Beg, a Khan of Kunduz (modern Afghanistan) and later Emir of Bokhara (modern Uzbekistan) in the 19th century.
- Mahabat Khan, a prominent Mughal general and statesman
- Isfandiyar Beg Khan, Mughal faujdar of Sylhet
- Ibrahim Khan Fath-i-Jang, a Subahdar of Bengal during the reign of emperor Jahangir.
- Mirza Asadullah Khan Ghalib, a classical Urdu and Persian poet from the Mughal Empire during British colonial rule.
- Bekkhan Barakhoyev, a politician from Russia.
- Bekkhan Agayev, also a politician from Russia.
