= Nawab Sayyid Husain Ali II Khan Bahadur =

Nawab Sayyid Husain Ali II Khan Bahadur abducted his father and succeeded him as Nawab of Banganapalle in 1822, a position he held for ten years until 1832.

He was elder son of Nawab Sayyid Ghulam Muhammad Ali Khan I Bahadur, Jagirdar of Banganapalle, by his first wife, Najib un-nisa Begum Sahiba, only daughter of Nawab Sayyid Asad 'Ali Khan Bahadur, Jagirdar of Chenchelimala.

He however proved to be a poor financial manager and began accumulating large debts. Several attempts by the government to introduce reforms proved fruitless, until exasperation resulted in his deposition in 1832. The government annexed Banganapalle to the Madras Presidency and the Nawab retired to Hyderabad on a pension.

Finally the financial and administrative reforms having restored the state to solvency, the Governor of Madras-in-Council decided to return Banganapalle to him on 12 July 1848. He died shortly after without male heirs. He had two daughters, Imdad Husaini Begum Sahiba and Ruqiya Begum Sahiba.

He was succeeded in turn by his son-in-law and nephew, Nawab Sayyid Ghulam Muhammad Ali Khan II Bahadur.

== Titles held ==
Nawab Sayyid Husain Ali II Khan Bahadur Naqdi dynasty
Preceded by Nawab Sayyid Ghulam Muhammad Ali Khan I Bahadur	Jagirdar of Banganapalle; 8 September 1822–1832	Succeeded by Annexed to Madras Presidency
Preceded by Annexed to Madras Presidency	Jagirdar of Banganapalle; 1848	Succeeded by Nawab Sayyid Ghulam Muhammad Ali Khan II Bahadur

== See also ==
- Nawab of Carnatic
- Nawab of Masulipatam
- Nawab of Banganapalle
