= Nawab Sayyid Ghulam Muhammad Ali Khan I Bahadur =

Nawab of Banganapalle

Nawab Syed Ghulam Muhammad Ali Khan I Bahadur Mansur-Ud-Daullah (died 1825) was twice Nawab of Banganapalle in India.

The first time was between 1783 and 1784, as Jagirdar. His second reign was from 1789 to 1820. His time saw many significant changes in the history of Banganapalle, most significant being the recovery through marriage of the Jagir of Chenchelimala.

== Biography ==
He was eldest son of Sayyid Husain Ali Khan Bahadur.

He succeeded on the death of his father as Jagirdar of Banganapalle, 26 August 1783. He reigned under the guardianship of his paternal uncle between 1783 and 1784.

Fled with him to Hyderabad when Hyder Ali invaded and overran Banganapalle, 1784. Entered the Nizam's service and appointed to a mansab of high rank, losing the fingers of his right hand in battle against the Marathas. Recovered the jagir after his uncle defeated Tipu's forces under Muhammad Yusuf and Kutb ud-din at Tammadapalle before 21 September 1789, but preferred to reside in Hyderabad with his family.

Later he was granted the jagir of Chenchelimala by his paternal uncle and father-in-law as marriage gift. Finally, he was abdicated in favour of his eldest son, before 8 September 1822.

He married on 31 August 1791, Najib un-nisa Begum Sahiba, only daughter of Nawab Sayyid Asad Ali Khan Bahadur, Jagirdar of Chenchelimala.

He died at Hyderabad, 4 June 1825 and was buried at Banganapalle.

== See also ==
- Nawab of Carnatic
- Nawab of Masulipatam
- Nawab of Banganapalle
- Princely state

Nawab Sayyid Ghulam Muhammad Ali Khan I Bahadur Naqdi dynasty
Preceded by Sayyid Husain Ali Khan Bahadur	Jagirdar of Banganapalle (First time); 26 August 1783 – 26 November 1784	Succeeded by Muhammad Yusuf (On behalf of Tipu Sultan)
Preceded by Muhammad Yusuf (On behalf of Tipu Sultan)	Jagirdar of Banganapalle (Second time); 21 September 1789 – 8 September 1822	Succeeded by Nawab Sayyid Husain Ali II Khan Bahadur
Preceded by Nawab Sayyid Asad Ali Khan Bahadur	Jagirdar of Chenchelimala; 31 August 1791 – 8 September 1822	Succeeded by Nawab Sayyid Husain Ali II Khan Bahadur
