= Muhammad Taqi Khan =

- Issue: Nawab Hasan Ali Khan Bahadur
- Military career
- Allegiance: Mughal Empire
- Branch: Nawab of Masulipatam; Nawab of Cuttack; Subedar of Odisha
- Rank: Mansabdar, Faujdar, Subedar, Nawab
- Spouse: Qudusa Begum Sahiba (Bahu Begum of Cuttack)
- Relatives: Shehzadi Razia (married to Gajapati Ramachandradeva)
- Religion: Islam

Nawab Muhammad Taqi Khan Bahadur was Nawab of Masulipatam. He attacked Sisupalgarh town in 1731.

He was the only son of Yusuf Khan Bahadur (brother of Faiz Ali Khan Bahadur). His second son Nawab Hasan Ali Khan Bahadur succeeded him.he is killed by a khandayat war lord named as NARASINGHA JENA

== Genealogy ==
His grandfather was Nawab Ali Quli Khan Bahadur, elder son of Faiz Beg Najm-i-Sani, and grandson of Nawab Mirza Muhammad Bakir Khan Najm-i-Sani, sometime Subadar of Multan, Oudh, Orissa, Gujarat and Delhi. Wazir to Emperor Aurangzeb His grandfather was married to a sister of Imad ul-Mulk, Nawab Khwaja Muhammad Mubariz Khan Bahadur, Hizbar Jang, sometime Subadar of the Deccan and Wazir.

His grandfather had three sons,

- Fazl Ali Khan Bahadur, Qiladar of Chenchelimala.
- Faiz Ali Khan Bahadur, Sometime Qiladar of Banganapalle and Chenchelimala, ancestor of the Nawabs of Banganapalle.
- Yusuf Khan Bahadur, his father.

== Titles held ==
Muhammad Taqi Khan Najm-i-Sani Dynasty
Preceded by None	Nawab of Masulipatam ?–?	Succeeded by Nawab Hasan Ali Khan Bahadur

== See also ==
- Nawab of Carnatic
- Nawab of Banganapalle
