= Subhan Bakhsh =

- Military career
- Allegiance: Mughal Empire
- Branch: Nawab of Masulipatam
- Rank: Nawab

Subhan Bakhsh was son of Nawab Hasan Ali Khan Bahadur, and succeeded him as Nawab of Masulipatam in India.

== Official name ==
His official name was Rustam Jah, Nawab..Ali Khan Bahadur [Subhan Bakhsh].

== Titles held ==
Subhan Bakhsh Najm-i-Sani Dynasty
Preceded by Nawab Hasan Ali Khan Bahadur	Nawab of Masulipatam; 1771–1799	Succeeded by Qutb ud-Daula

== See also ==
- Nawab of Carnatic
- Nawab of Banganapalle
