= Husain Ali Khan Bahadur =

Nawab of Banganapalle from 1769 to 1783

Husain Ali Khan Bahadur was Nawab of Banganapalle between 1769 and 1783. He belonged to the Naqdi Dynasty.

== Birth ==
Husain Ali Khan Bahadur was the elder son of Sayyid Muhammad Khan Naqdi, by his wife, Amat ul-Batul Khanum, daughter of Fazl Ali Khan II Bahadur.

== Life ==
He entered the Nizam's service, rising to the rank of a mansabdar of 800 sowar and was promoted to 2,000 zat and 1,000 sowar. Later, he was recognised as successor to his maternal uncle. He was granted the personal title of Khan Bahadur on 11 February 1765. He succeeded as Jagirdar of Banganapalle on the death of his unmarried uncle on 7 April 1769.

Later he entered the service of Hyder Ali, becoming a high-ranking officer in his armies.

== Death ==
He died while returning to Banganapalle from Mysore on 26 August 1783. He was succeeded by his young son, Ghulam Muhammad Ali, with Ghulam's paternal uncle as regent.

== Titles held ==
Husain Ali Khan Bahadur Naqdi dynasty
Preceded by Nawab Fazl Ali Khan III Bahadur	Jagirdar of Banganapalle; 7 April 1769–26 August 1783	Succeeded by Nawab Sayyid Ghulam Muhammad Ali Khan I Bahadur

== See also ==
- Nawab of Carnatic
- Nawab of Masulipatam
- Nawab of Banganapalle
