= Ali Quli Khan =

Nawab Ali Quli Mirza Bahadur was the ancestor of Nawabs of Banganapalle and Masulipatam. He belongs to The Najm-i-Sani Dynasty.

== Genealogy ==
He was elder son of Faiz Beg Najm-i-Sani, and grandson of Nawab Mirza Muhammad Bakir Khan Najm-i-Sani a Grandson of the Ottoman Prince Şehzade Ahmet, sometime Subadar of Multan, Oudh, Orissa, Gujarat and Delhi. He was Wazir to Emperor Aurangzeb. His grandfather was married to a sister of Imad ul-Mulk, Nawab Khwaja Muhammad Mubariz Khan Bahadur, Hizbar Jang, sometime Subadar of the Deccan and Wazir.

Nawab Ali Quli Khan Bahadur had three sons,

- Fazl Ali Khan Bahadur, Qiladar of Chenchelimala.
- Faiz Ali Khan Bahadur, Sometime Qiladar of Banganapalle and Chenchelimala, ancestor of the Nawabs of Banganapalle.
- Yusuf Khan Bahadur, father of Nawab Muhammad Taqi Khan Bahadur, Nawab of Masulipatam.

== Titles held ==
- Subadar of Multan, Oudh, Orissa, Gujarat and Delhi.
- Wazir to Emperor Aurangzeb.

== See also ==
- Nawab of Carnatic
- Nawab of Banganapalle
- Nawab of Masulipatam
