= Qutb ud-Daula =

Nawab of Masulipatam

- Died: 1821
- Military career
- Allegiance: Mughal Empire
- Branch: Nawab of Masulipatam
- Rank: titular Nawab

Qutb ud-Daula (died 1821) was Nawab of Masulipatam from 1799. His power was mostly nominal from 1800. As titular Nawab, he continued until his death.

He was succeeded by his brother Nawab Muhammad Ali Khan Bahadur. He had a daughter named Manna Begum.

== Titles held ==
Qutb ud-Daula Najm-i-Sani Dynasty
Preceded by Subhan Bakhsh	Nawab of Masulipatam; 1799–?	Succeeded by Nawab Muhammad Ali Khan Bahadur

== See also ==
- Nawab of Carnatic
- Nawab of Banganapalle
