= Nawab Fazl Ali Khan III Bahadur =

Nawab Fazl Ali Khan III Bahadur (11 December 1749 – 7 April 1769) was Nawab of Banganapalle between 1758 and 1769. But his possessions was confirmed only in 1765.

== Birth ==
Nawab Fazl Ali Khan III Bahadur was born in 1749 at Banganapalle. He was the only son of Fazl Ali II Khan Bahadur and Khair un-nisa Begum Sahiba His birthname was Ghazanfar Ali Mirza.

== Royal name ==
His official name was Qum Qam ud-Daula, Nawab Fazl Ali Khan III Bahadur, Shamsher Jang [Gulli Nawab], Jagirdar of Banganapalle and Chenchelimala.

== Life ==
He succeeded on the death of his paternal grandfather, Nawab Faiz Ali Khan Bahadur in 1758. He reigned under the guardianship of the husband of his maternal aunt, Muhammad Beg Khan-i-Lang between 1758 and 1767. He got confirmed in his possessions by the Nizam of Hyderabad on 17 January 1765. He entered the Nizam's service and appointed to a mansab of 500 zat and was promoted to 3,000 zat and 2,000 sowar and granted the title of Khan Bahadur 11 February 1765. Later he expelled his guardian and assumed full ruling powers in 1767. Later he was again promoted to the titles of Qum Qam ud-Daula and Shamsher Jang.

== Death ==
He died of smallpox on 7 April 1769 and was succeeded by his nephew, Sayyid Husain Ali Khan Bahadur

== See also ==
- Nawab of Carnatic
- Nawab of Masulipatam
- Nawab of Banganapalle
- Northern Circars

Nawab Fazl Ali Khan III Bahadur Najm-i-Sani Dynasty
Preceded by Nawab Faiz Ali Khan Bahadur	Jagirdar of Chenchelimala; 1758 – 20 June 1765	Succeeded by Nawab Sayyid Asad Ali Khan Bahadur
Preceded by Nawab Faiz Ali Khan Bahadur	Jagirdar of Banganapalle; 1758 – 7 April 1769	Succeeded by Sayyid Husain Ali Khan Bahadur
