= Faiz Ali Khan =

Nawab Faiz Ali Khan Bahadur (Muhammad Beg Khan Najm-i-Sani), was a ruler of the princely state of Banganapalle, including the Chenchelimala territory.

He was the second son of Nawab Ali Quli Khan Bahadur. The sister of Imad ul-Mulk was the wife of Ali Quli Khan's father/grandfather in the Najm-i-Sani genealogy, not the mother of Faiz Ali Khan, Nawab Khwaja Muhammad Mubariz Khan Bahadur, Hizbar Jang, sometime Subedar of the Deccan and Vizier. He is variously described as grandson, son-in-law or adopted son of Muhammad Beg Khan-e Rosebahani, Qiladar of Banganapalle. He entered the service of the Adil Shahi sultans of Bijapur and succeeded Muhammad Beg Khan-e Rosebahani as Qiladar of Banganapalle in 1686. He was confirmed in the jagir of Banganapalle by the Mughal viceroy of the Deccan sometime before 3 November 1719.

He succeeded to Chenchelimala on the death of his elder brother, Fazl Ali Khan Bahadur, in 1738. He died at Banganapalle Fort sometime before 25 August 1759.

Faiz Ali Khan's younger brother was Yusuf Khan Bahadur, Nawab Muhammad Taqi Khan Bahadur was Nawab of Masulipatam, whose son was Nawab Hasan Ali Khan Bahadur, a very famous person in the nawabs of Masulipatam.

== See also ==
- Nawab of the Carnatic
- Nawab of Masulipatam

Faiz Ali Khan Najm-i-Sani dynasty
| Preceded by Fazl Ali Khan Bahadur | Qiladar of Chenchelimala later as Jagirdar; 21 April 1738 – 1759 | Succeeded by Nawab Fazl Ali Khan III Bahadur |
| Preceded by Muhammad Beg Khan-e Rosebahani | Jagirdar of Banganapalle; Qiladar until 1719; 1686 – 1759 | Succeeded by Nawab Fazl Ali Khan III Bahadur |
