= Husain Ali Khan =

Husain Ali Khan Bahadur was Nawab of Masulipatam in India.

He was son of Nawab Daud Ali Khan Bahadur. He was married to Abbasi Begum Sahiba (first) and Dildar Begum Sahiba (second). He had a son named Nawab Reza Ali Khan – II.

== Official name ==
His official name was Qutb ud-Mulk, Mubarak ud-Daula, Nawab Husain 'Ali Khan Bahadur, Mubarak Jang.

== Titles held ==
Husain Ali Khan Najm-i-Sani Dynasty
Titles in pretence
Preceded by Nawab Daud Ali Khan Bahadur	Nawab of Masulipatam; 1883–?	Succeeded by Nawab Reza Ali Khan – II (Titular prince)

== See also ==
- Nawab of Carnatic
- Nawab of Banganapalle
