= Jafar Ali Khan =

Nawab of Cambay from 1880 to 1915

Nawab of Cambay
- Reign: April 1880 – 21 January 1915
- Coronation: 11 June 1880
- Predecessor: Husain Yawar Khan I
- Successor: Husain Yawar Khan II
- Born: 26 August 1848
- Died: 21 January 1915 (aged 66)
- Wives: Gauhar Khanum (m. 1876); Khurshid Jahan (m. 1882)
- Issue: Husain Yawar Khan II
- Dynasty: Najm-i-Sani
- Father: Husain Yawar Khan I

Jafar Ali Khan (or Momin Khan VI; 26 August 1848 – 21 January 1915) was Nawab of Cambay from April 1880 until his death in 1915.

== Early life, family, and education ==
He was born on 26 August 1848 to Husain Yawar Khan I. He was educated privately in Urdu and Persian. He married, firstly, in 1876, to Gauhar Khanum, daughter of a Maulvi of Masulipatam, and, secondly, in 1882, to Khurshid Jahan. Khurshid Jahan was a granddaughter of Mobee Khan, son of Kallel Khan, who was sent by Fath-Ali Shah Qajar, the Shah of Iran, as his ambassador to India in 1802. He had issue: a son, Husain Yawar Khan II, and daughters.

== Reign ==
On the death of his father in April 1880, he immediately became the Nawab of Cambay, but it was not until 11 June 1880 that he formally ascended the throne. In 1881, he signed an agreement with the British government whereby he agreed to stop growing poppy and manufacturing opium in his state, to control all opium imports and sales according to British rules, and to report opium imports, sales, proceeds, and remaining stock to the British every six months. In return, the British government agreed to pay him a duty of 650 rupees per chest of opium consumed in his state. In the same year, he entered into another agreement with the British government. By this one, he permanently closed and flooded his salt works, stopped all salt manufacturing and natural salt collection, and banned the import or export of any salt except British duty-paid salt in his state. In return, the British promised to pay him 40,000 rupees yearly and to give him 500 maunds of free salt. However, if he were ever to reopen the salt works, these payments would stop and his original salt rights would return. In 1897, he signed another agreement with the British government and by it he gave up all poppy cultivation and local opium manufacture, agreed to import all opium only from British depots, sell only through licensed vendors at prices no lower than Kaira, enforce British opium laws, and submit half-yearly accounts. In return, he got the full duty (650 rupees per chest) refunded on all opium legally imported into Cambay for consumption. From 1882 to 1890, Cambay saw serious disturbances because his subjects opposed the new administrative methods and because the ministers of the state were injudicious. To combat this, he asked the British government to intervene and help him introduce order in his state. The British government then appointed a special political agent and lent him the services of three well-trained British officers to conduct the administration of the state: one as Diwan, and the other two as the heads of the revenue and police departments. Three years later, this political agent was withdrawn, and the full ruling and administrative powers were given back to him. He took the keenest interest in the cause of education. The total number of educational institutions in Cambay at the time of his accession was two, and by 1912 their number had risen to 42, of which four were for girls. He set up scholarships for students wanting to study further abroad or take technical exams. Similarly, at the time of his accession, there were no institutions in Cambay to give proper medical relief to the sick, and little attention was paid to sanitation. He built hospitals for people and a veterinary dispensary for animals, and he improved the sanitary conditions in Cambay. Beside that, he built a market, a library called Lord Ray Library, Jafar Ali Khan Water Works, new roads, a garden called Neja, a zoo and a savings bank..

He attended the Delhi Durbars of 1903 and 1911.

== Death ==
He died on 21 January 1915 and was succeeded by Husain Yawar Khan II to his title, rank and dignity.

== Titles and styles ==
Following his accession, his complete title and style was: His Highness Najib-ud-Daula Mumtaz-ul-Mulk Sardar Nawab Mirza Jafar Ali Khan Momin Khan Sahib Bahadur Dilawar Jang Dawe Iqbalu, the Nawab of Cambay.

Jafar Ali Khan Najm-i-Sani Born: 26 August 1848 Died: 21 January 1915
Regnal titles
Preceded by Husain Yawar Khan I	Nawab of Cambay; April 1880 – 21 January 1915	Succeeded by Husain Yawar Khan II
