= Daud Khan =

Daud Khan, Daoud Khan, or Dawood Khan may refer to:

- Daud Ali Khan (died 1883), Nawab of Masulipatam, India
- Daud Khan (cricketer) (1912–1979), cricket player and umpire
- Daud Khan Karrani (reigned 1572–76), Bengali ruler who fought the armies of Akbar the Great
- Daud Khan Panni, Mughal official
- Daud Khan Undiladze, 17th-century Georgian official in the Iranian service
- Daud Shah of Gujarat (born Daud Khan), 15th-century ruler of the Gujarat Sultanate in India; r. 1458–1458
- David XI (died 1579), a.k.a. Daud Khan of Kartli, Muslim Georgian king
- Mohammad Daoud Khan (1909–1978), president of the Republic of Afghanistan
