= Muhammad Ali Khan of Masulipatam =

Muhammad Ali Khan (died 1853), popularly known as Nawab Ali Khan, was perhaps the most well known and reputed Nawab of Masulipatam in India. He was preceded by Qutb Ud Daula. The Nawabs of Masulipatam ruled under the Nizam in east India. The title was later known as Nawab of Banganapalle, as they family shifted from the region of Masulipatam to the territory of Banganapalle. Nawab Muhammad Ali Khan Bahadur belongs to the dynasty of Najm-i-Sani.

Muhammad Ali was dispossessed of the title of Nawab and Daud Ali Khan Bahadur, his son, succeeded him and became the next Nawab of Masulipatam. Daud Ali Khan Bahadur was officially known as Rustam Jah, Najm ud-Daula, Nawab Daud `Ali Khan Bahadur, Intizam Jang of Masulipatam. He died in the year 1883.

== Official name ==
His official name was Intizam ud-Daula, Nawab Muhammad 'Ali Khan Bahadur, of Masulipatam.

== See also ==
- Nawab of Carnatic
- Nawab of Banganapalle

Muhammad Ali Khan of Masulipatam Najm-i-Sani Dynasty
Titles in pretence
Preceded by Qutb ud-Daula	Nawab of Masulipatam ?–1853	Succeeded by Nawab Daud Ali Khan Bahadur
