= Husain Yawar Khan I =

Nawab of Cambay from 1841 to 1880

Nawab of Cambay
- Reign: c. 1841 – April 1880
- Predecessor: Bande Ali Khan
- Successor: Jafar Ali Khan
- Died: April 1880
- Dynasty: Najm-i-Sani
- Father: Yawar Ali Khan

Husain Yawar Khan I (or Momin Khan V) was Nawab of Cambay from 1841 until his death in April 1880.

== Early life and family ==
Husain was born to Yawar Ali Khan, who was a son of Muhammad Quli Khan. He married and had issue: a total of seven sons, including Jafar Ali Khan.

== Reign ==
His uncle, Bande Ali Khan, had before dying in 1841 left the state of Cambay to his brother Yawar. But Yawar waived his right of succession to the throne of Cambay in favour of Husain. Accordingly, Husain ascended the throne in 1841. On 11 March 1862, the Earl Canning, on behalf of Queen Victoria, granted him a sanad whereby Canning assured him that the Crown undertakes to recognise and uphold any lawful succession to the state, including in the absence of natural heirs, provided such succession accords with Muhammadan law, and guaranteed him non-interference with this arrangement so long as his house remains loyal to the Crown and complies with its treaty obligations.

== Death ==
Husain died in April 1880 and was succeeded by his son Jafar Ali Khan.

== Titles and styles ==
Following his accession, his complete title and style was: His Highness Najm-ud-Daula Mumtaz-ul-Mulk Nawab Mirza Husain Yawar Khan Momin Khan Sahib Bahadur Dilawar Jang, the Nawab of Cambay.
