= Muhammad Beg Khan-e Rosebahani =

Muhammad Beg Khan-e Rosebahani was Qiladar and Jagirdar of Banganapalle. He was a supposed uncle of Imad ul-Mulk, Nawab Khwaja Muhammad Mubariz Khan Bahadur, Hizbar Jang, sometime Subadar of the Deccan and Wazir. In 1665, he was appointed as Qiladar of Banganapalle Fort and granted the surrounding districts in Jagir by the Sultan of Bijapur. He died in 1686.

== Titles held ==
Preceded by Siddhu Sumbal	Qiladar and Jagirdar of Banganapalle; 1665–1686	Succeeded by Faiz Ali Khan Bahadur

== See also ==
- Nawab of Carnatic
- Nawab of Masulipatam
- Nawab of Banganapalle
