= Haji Hassan Khan =

Nawab of Masulipatam

- Died: 1771
- Military career
- Allegiance: Mughal Empire
- Branch: Nawab of Masulipatam
- Rank: Mansabdar, Faujdar, Subedar, Nawab
- Conflicts: Carnatic Wars

Haji Hassan Khan was a Nawab of Masulipatam. He was the second son of Nawab Muhammad Taqi Khan Bahadur, who was also a Nawab of Masulipatam.

== Official name ==
His official name was Nizam ud-Daula, Nawab Hasan Ali Khan Bahadur, Nawab of Masulipatam.

== Life ==
He entered the Nizam's service and was appointed to a large mansab. A firman from him authorized the French representative Fouquet, then chief of the company at Machilipatnam, to set up a loge (Note: trade zone where the French enjoyed legal and fiscal privileges) at Yanaon in 1731.

He became faujdar of the Northern Circars between 1758 and 1765. He surrendered the government to the East India Company in return for a substantial pension and jagirs.

== Death ==
He died at Masulipatam in 1771.

== Titles held ==
Haji Hassan Khan Najm-i-Sani Dynasty
Preceded by Nawab Muhammad Taqi Khan Bahadur	Nawab of Masulipatam before 1731 – 1771	Succeeded by Subhan Bakhsh
Preceded by French East Indian Company	Faujdar of Northern Circars; 1758–1765	Succeeded by British East India Company

== See also ==
- Nawab of Carnatic
- Nawab of Banganapalle
