= Naqdi dynasty =

The Naqdi dynasty, of Persian origin, were Nawabs who ruled Banganapalle and Chenchelimala from 1769 to 1948: see Second Dynasty of Banganapalle Nawabs. They trace their descent from one Seyyed Mohammad Khan Razavi, who served as Vizier to Shah Safi of Persia in the 17th century.

== Rulers ==
Nawabs	Reign from	Reign Until
Syed Husayn Ali Khan I	1769	1783
Syed Ghulam Muhammad Ali Khan I	1790	1820
Syed Husayn Ali Khan II	1820	1832
Syed Ghulam Muhammad Ali Khan II	1849	1867
Syed Fatih Ali Khan	1867	1905
Syed Ghulam Muhammad Ali Khan III	1905	1923
Mir Fazl Ali Khan III	1923	1947
Mir Ghulam Ali Khan	1947	1948
Namesake Rulers
Mir Ghulam Ali Khan	1948	1983
Mir Fazl Ali Khan IV	1983	Incumbent
