= Asad Ali =

Asad Ali may refer to:

- Asad Ali (politician) (died 2007), Bangladeshi politician
- Malik Asad Ali Khokhar, Pakistani politician
- Asad Ali (cricketer) (born 1988), Pakistani cricketer
- Asad Ali Khan (1937–2011), Indian musician
- Asad Ali Khan Bahadur (fl. 1765–1791), ruler of Chenchelimala
- Asad Ali Toor, Pakistani journalist

== See also ==
- Ali Asad (disambiguation)
