= Daud Ali Khan =

Daud Ali Khan Bahadur was Nawab of Masulipatam in India. He was son of Nawab Muhammad Ali Khan Bahadur.

== Official name royal nawab ==
His official name was Rustam Jah, Najm ud-Daula, Nawab Daud 'Ali Khan Bahadur, Intizam Jang, of Masulipatam.

== Death ==
He died in 1883. He was succeeded by his elder son, Nawab Husain Ali Khan Bahadur.

== Titles held ==
Daud Ali Khan Najm-i-Sani Dynasty
Titles in pretence
Preceded by Nawab Muhammad Ali Khan Bahadur	Nawab of Masulipatam; 1853–1883	Succeeded by Nawab Husain Ali Khan Bahadur

== See also ==
- Nawab of Carnatic
- Nawab of Banganapalle
