= Yagantipalle =

- Revenue Village
- Interactive map of Yagantipalle
- Location in Andhra Pradesh, India Yagantipalle (India)
- Coordinates: 15.327000°N 78.187°E
- Country: India
- State: Andhra Pradesh
- District: Nandyal
- Mandal: Banaganapalle

Government
  - Type: Sarpanch

Population (2011)
  - Total: 2,052

Languages
  - Official: Telugu
- Time zone: UTC+5:30 (IST)

Yagantipalle is a village in Nandyal district, Andhra Pradesh, India. It is located 74 kilometres (46 mi) south of Kurnool town. Yagantipalle is 4 kilometres (2.5 mi) from Banganapalle, an area known for its mango cultivation. Yagantipalle cultivates mangoes on about 800 acres (3.2 km^{2}) of land.
