= Beri State =

Coordinates: 25°55′N 79°54′E

Beri State बेरी रियासत
- Princely State of British India
- c. 1750–1950
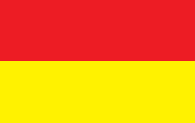
- Flag

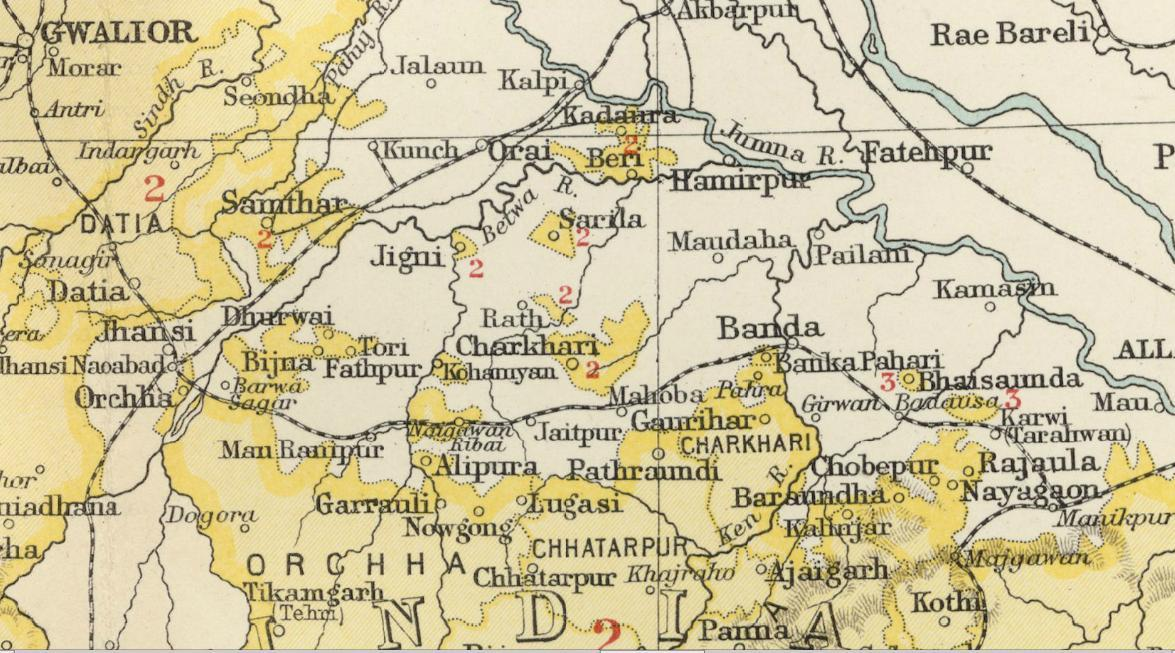
- Beri State in the Imperial Gazetteer of India
- Area
  - 1901: 82 km^{2} (32 sq mi)
- Population
  - 1901: 4,279
- History
  - Established: 4 March
  - Independence of India: 1950
Succeeded by
India
- Today part of: Hamirpur district, Uttar Pradesh, India

Beri State was a princely state of the Bundelkhand Agency of the British Raj. Its capital was at Beri, a small town, about 30 km from Hamirpur town.

In 1901, the state spanned an area of about 82.87 km^{2} with a population of 4,297 inhabitants in 1901. Together with Baoni State (Kadaura) at its northwestern edge Beri State was forming an enclave within the directly administered British territory of the Central Provinces.

== See also ==
- Political integration of India
