= Bekkhan Barakhoyev =

Russian politician (born 1973)

- Бекхан Барахоев
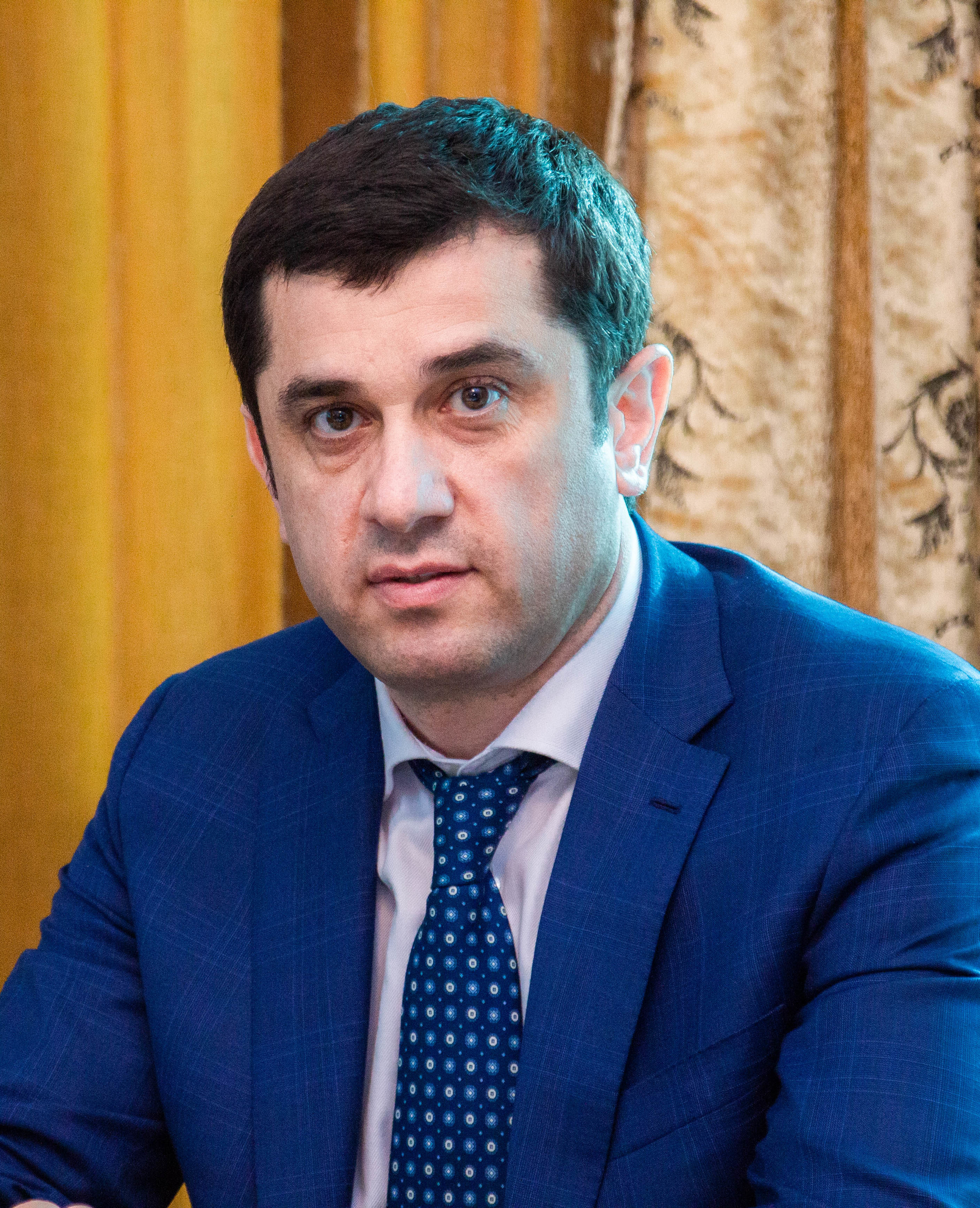

Deputy of the 8th State Duma
- Incumbent
- Assumed office 19 September 2021

Personal details
- Born: 1 August 1973 (age 53) Nazran, Checheno-Ingush Autonomous Soviet Socialist Republic, USSR
- Party: United Russia
- Education: Chechen-Ingush State University

Bekkhan Abdulkhamidovich Barakhoyev (Russian: Бекха́н Абдулхами́дович Барахо́ев; born 1 August 1973, Nazran, Checheno-Ingush Autonomous Soviet Socialist Republic) is a Russian political figure, deputy of the 8th State Duma convocation.

In 1994 he graduated from the Chechen-Ingush State University. Barakhoyev started his political career in 2000 when he was appointed an assistant adviser to the first Head of the Republic of Ingushetia Ruslan Aushev. From 2004 to 2011, he served as an assistant to the State Duma deputy Valery Vostrotin; in 2011–2016, he occupied the same position but for the deputy Joseph Kobzon. Until 2021 he was a vice president of the News Outdoor Group's subsidiary CJSC "Olimp" (Russian: ЗАО "Олимп").

Since September 2021, he has served as a deputy of the 8th State Duma convocation. He ran with the United Russia.

== Sanctions ==
Due to his support of Russian aggression and the violation of Ukraine’s territorial integrity during the Russo-Ukrainian war, he has been under personal international sanctions imposed by various countries since 2022. These include: all member states of the European Union (since February 23), Canada (since February 24), Switzerland (since February 25), Australia (since February 26), the United Kingdom (since March 11), the United States (since March 24), Japan (since April 12), New Zealand (since May 3), and Ukraine (since September 7).

== Family ==
Bekkhan Barakhoyev is married, he has 6 children.
