= Ali Asad =

Ali Asad may refer to:

- Ali Asad (cricketer, born 1976), United Arab Emirates cricketer of Pakistani descent
- Ali Asad (cricketer, born 1988), Pakistani cricketer
- Ali Asad (wrestler) (born 2000), Pakistani wrestler

== See also ==
- Asad Ali (disambiguation)
