= Baoni State =

Princely state of India

Coordinates: 25.98°N 79.85°E

- Jagir within the Maratha Confederacy (1784–1806); Princely State of British India (1806–1947) under the Dominion of India (1947–1948)
- 1784–1948
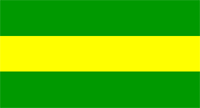
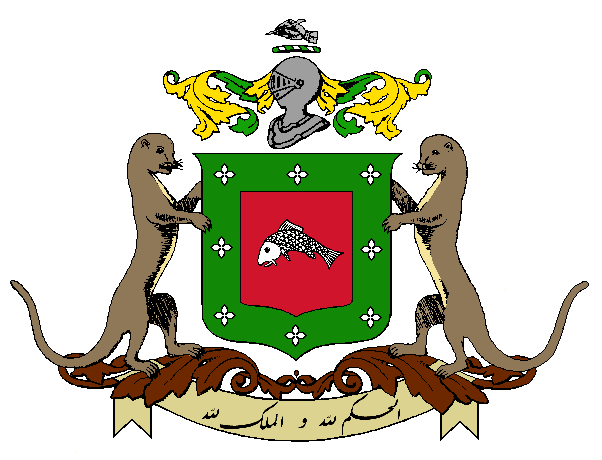
- Flag Coat of arms

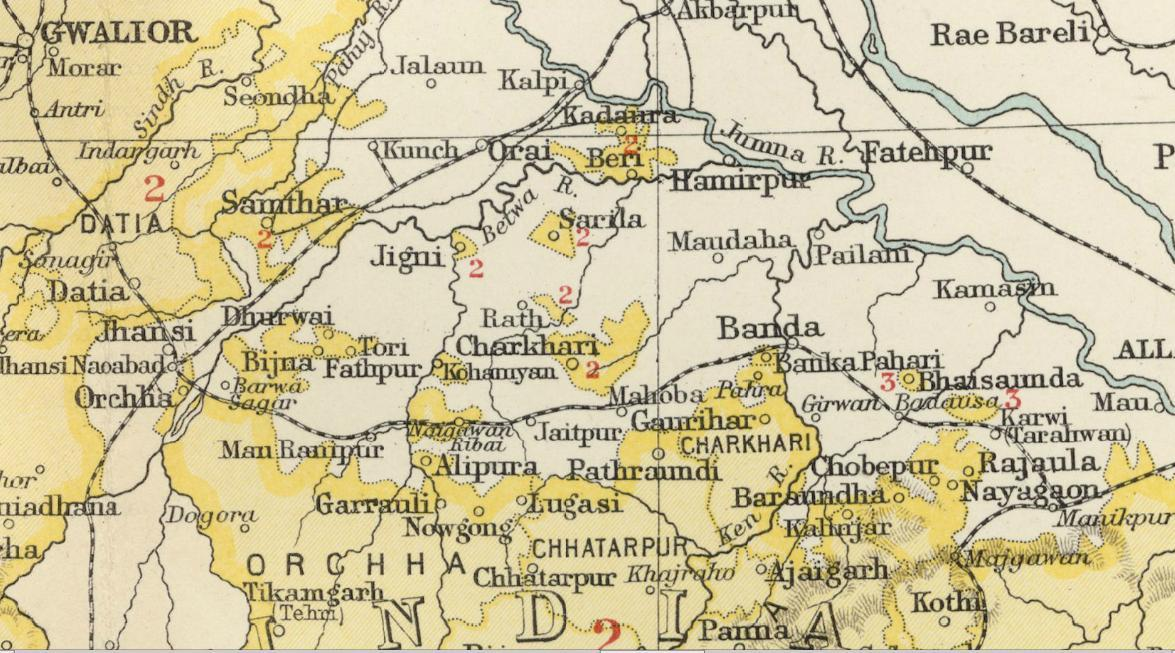
- Baoni State (Kadaura) in the Imperial Gazetteer of India
- Area
  - 1901: 313 km^{2} (121 sq mi)
- Population
  - 1901: 19,780
- Government
  - Motto: "Al hukumu lilah wāl mulk Lilāh" "الحكم لله والملك لله" (Rulership and dominion belongs to God)
- History
  - Established: 1784
  - Indian independence: 1948
Preceded by	Succeeded by
Maratha Empire	India
- The Imperial Gazetteer of India

Baoni State was a Jagir and later princely state in India during the Maratha Confederacy and British Raj. It was a small sanad state, the only Muslim-ruled one in Bundelkhand Agency. Its ruler was granted the right to an 11-gun salute. The Baoni royal family claim to be descendants of the Asaf Jahi dynasty of Hyderabad, tracing its origins to Abu Bakr, the first Islamic caliph.

Baoni was located in the Betwa-Yamuna doab, Uttar Pradesh, with Kadaura as its seat of government. The state was bounded on the north by the district of Cawnpore, in the west by the district of Jalaun and to the south and east by the district of Hamirpur of the United Provinces —as well as a little part in the south-east by Beri State. Baoni had a population of 19,780 inhabitants in 1901, of whom 87% were Hindu and 12% Muslim.

== Descendants and Current Rulers ==
The princely state is no longer existent due to its annexation by India during the partition. Due to this, there are no current rulers of the state and the descendants of the royal family remain scattered. There are known descendants of Nawab Syed Mohammed Mushtaq Al Hassan Khan Bahadur, through his granddaughter, Sikandar Begum and her daughter named Sajaadi Begum, one of whom was named Muhammad Hamid Khan. He and his family fled to Pakistan during the partition and have many descendants living in Pakistan and Canada. His paternal line being from him to his son Hammad Khan and his grandson Ayaan Khan living in Canada. His brother, Mehmood Aslam Khan, along with other siblings, remained in Pakistan and is described as leading the family there; his son, Usama Mehmood Khan, is among the descendants residing in Pakistan.

== See also ==
- Kadaura
- Nizam of Hyderabad
- List of Sunni Muslim dynasties
- Mahseer in heraldry
