= Cambay State =

Princely state in India during the British Raj

Coordinates: 22.3°N 72.62°E

Khämbā State খাম্বা রাজ্য
- Independent (1730–1753); State under the Maratha Confederacy (1753–1803); Protectorate of the East India Company (1803–1857); Princely state of the British Raj (1857–1947); Under the Dominion of India (1947–1948)
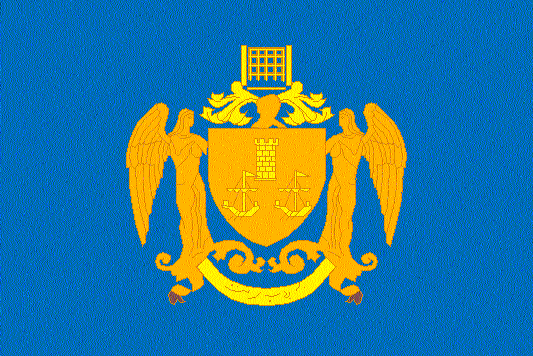
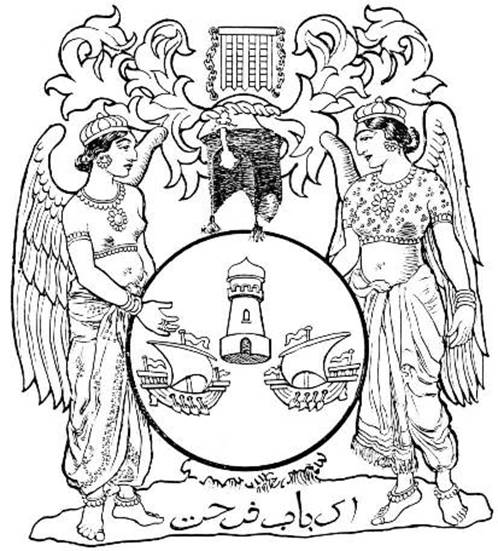
- Flag Coat of arms

- Khämbā State in modern state of Gujarat
- Capital: Khambhat
- Demonym: খাম্বাজ
- Area
  - 1901: 906 km^{2} (350 sq mi)
- Population
  - 1901: 75,122
- Government
  - Motto: "Dar Babi Farhat" ("This Is the Gate of Joy")
- Nawab
  - 1730–1742 (first): Mumin Khan I
  - 1915–1948 (last): Yawar Khan II
- Historical era: 18th-20th century
Preceded by	Succeeded by
Gujarat Subah	Bombay state
- This article incorporates text from a publication now in the public domain: Chisholm, Hugh, ed. (1911). "Cambay". Encyclopædia Britannica (11th ed.). Cambridge University Press.

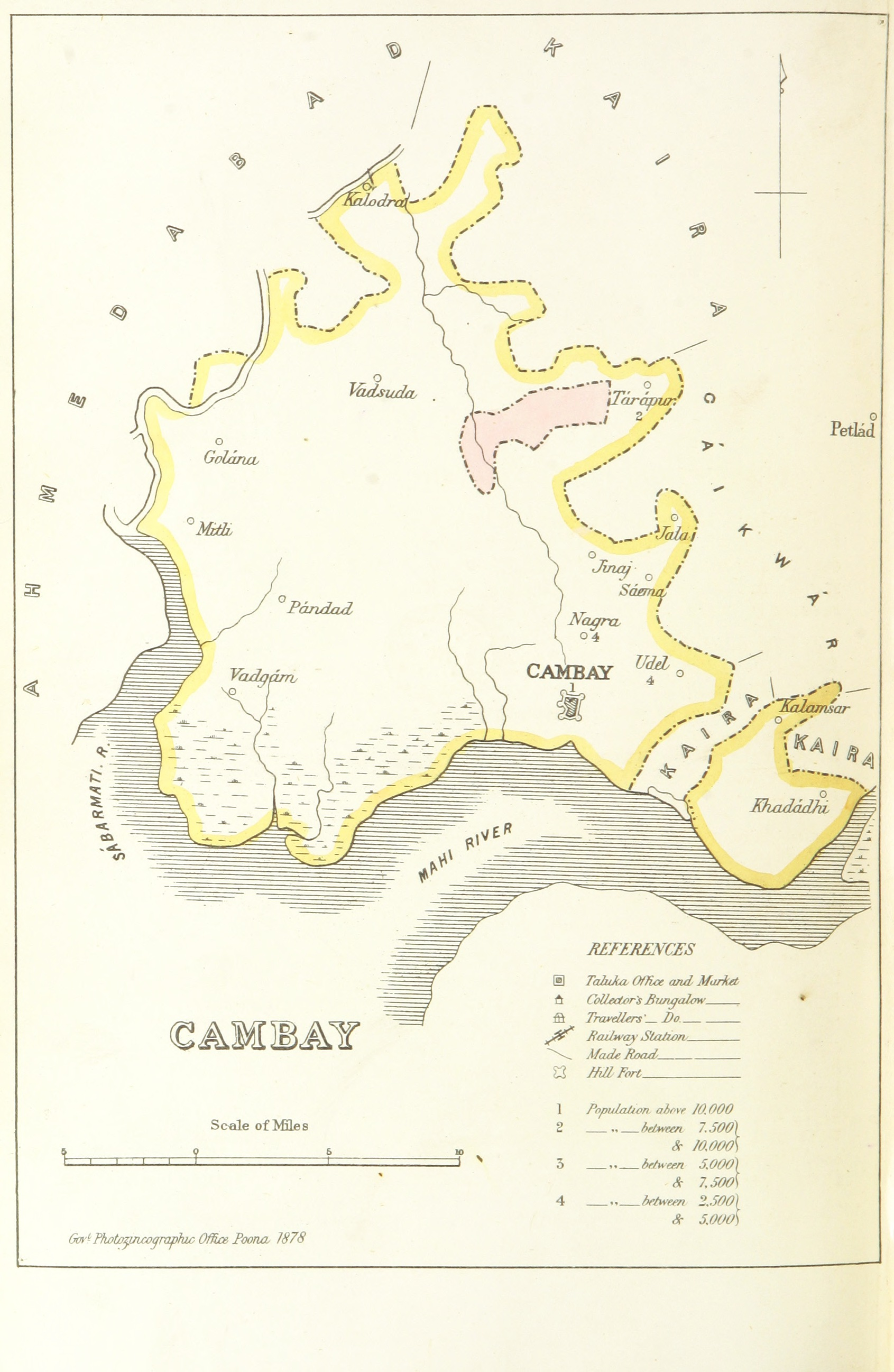
Map of khämbā State

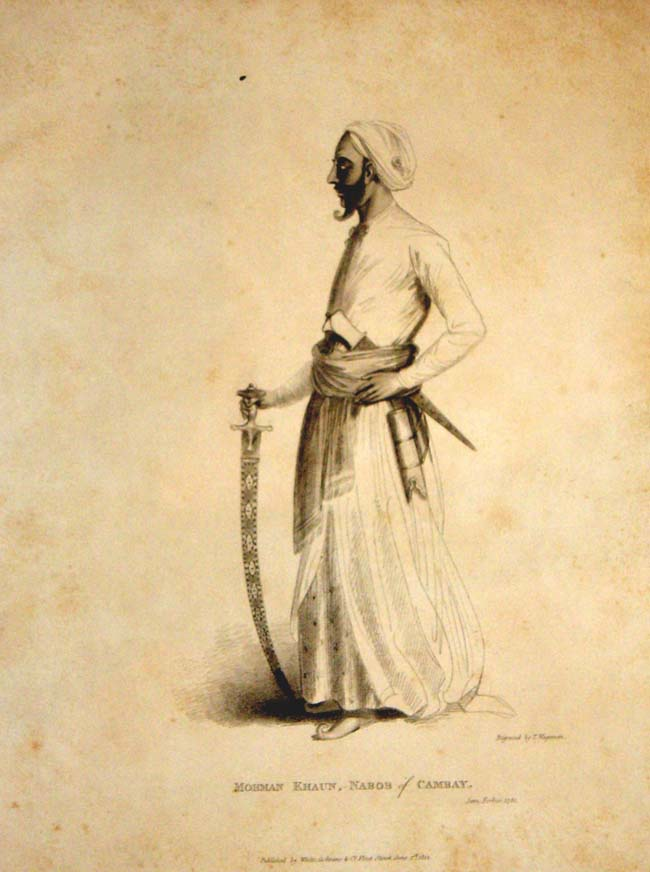
Mu´min Khan, Nawab of khāmbā

Khämbā state or Cambay state was a kingdom and later princely state in India during the British Raj. The city of Khambhat in present-day Gujarat was its capital. The state was bounded in the north by the Kaira district (Kheda) and in the south by the Gulf of Khambhat.

Khämbā was the only state in the Kaira Agency of the Gujarat division of the Bombay Presidency, which merged into the Baroda and Gujarat States Agency in 1937.

== History ==
Maharaja of Parmar Rajputs had established the State of Cambay. Cambay was invaded in 1730 by the penultimate Mughal governor of Gujarat, Mirza Ja'far Mu'min Khan I, the last of the Mughal governors of Gujarat, at the time of the dismemberment of Mughal rule in India. In 1742 Mirza Ja'far Mu'min Khan I defeated his brother-in-law Nizam Khan, governor of Khambhat, and established himself in his place.

=== Hub of Mercantile activity ===
The traders and the merchants reached here from across the world. Cambay was known for its cotton and silk cloths. Cambay was one of India's most active trade center since the 14th century (Source: Ibn Battuta). After 200 years, Duarte Barbosa described Cambay as an important commercial center with carpets, and other textile goods in Mughal established industries.

Cambay was taken by the Marathas in 1753. Finally it was ceded to the British by the Peshwa under the treaty of 1803. The state was provided with a railway in 1901.

== List of rulers ==
=== Rulers ===
The rulers of the state bore the title of 'Nawab' and had the privilege of an 11-gun salute.

==== Nawabs ====
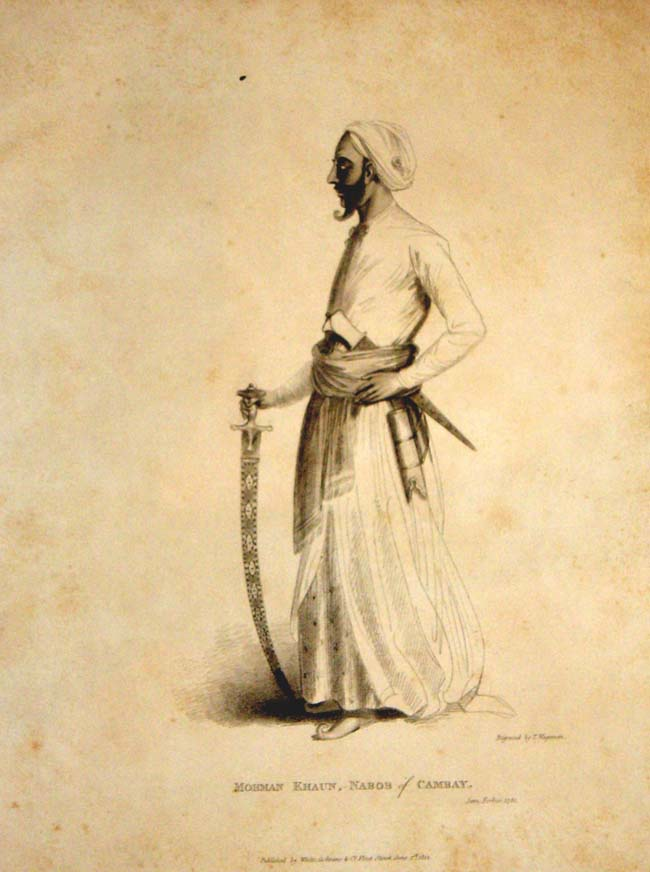
Mu´min Khan, Nawab of Cambay.

- 1730 – 1742 Mirza Jaffar Mumin Khan I, penultimate Mughal governor of Gujarat
- 1742 – 1743 Nur-ud-din Muftakher Khan
- 1743 – 1784 Najm ad-Dawla Ja`far Mu´min Khan II
- 1784 – 1790 Mohammad Qoli Khan (d. 1790)
- 1790 – 28 October 1823 Fath `Ali Khan (d. 1823)
- 1823 – 15 March 1841 Banda `Ali Khan (d. 1841)
- 1841 – Apr 1880 Husayn Yawar Khan I (d. 1880)
- 11 Jun 1880 – 21 January 1915 Najib ad-Dawla Mumtaz al-Molk Ja`far `Ali Khan (b. 1848 – d. 1915)
- 21 Jan 1915 – 1930 .... -Regent
- 21 Jan 1915 – 15 Aug 1947/10 June 1948 Nizam ad-Dawla Najm ad-Dawla Mumtaz al-Molk Husayn Yawar Khan II (b. 1911 – d. ....)

=== Details About Lives of Nawabs of Cambay state ===
- Mirza JA'AFAR MU'MIN KHAN I 1730/1742, last Muslim Governor of Gujarat
- Nawab NURADDIN MUFTAKHAR KHAN 1742/1743
- Nawab JA'AFAR MU'MIN KHAN II 1743/1784
- Nawab MUHAMMED QULI KHAN 1784/1790, son of Najam Khan (poisoned 1748), married and had issue. He died 1790.
- Nawab FATH ALI KHAN (qv)
- Nawab FATH ALI KHAN 1790/1823, eldest of three sons, he received the title Najum-ud-Daulah Mumtaz-ul-Mulk Khan Bahadur Dilawar Jung, and the rank of a commander of six thousand as Nawab of Cambay.
- Najum-ud-Daulah Mumtaz-ul-Mulk Momin Khan Bahadur Dilawar Jung Nawab BANDA ALI KHAN 1823/1841
- Najum-ud-Daulah Mumtaz-ul-Mulk Momin Khan Bahadur Dilawar Jung Nawab HUSAIN YAWAR KHAN I 1841/1880
- Najum-ud-Daulah Mumtaz-ul-Mulk Momin Khan Bahadur Dilawar Jung Nawab JA'AFAR ALI KHAN Bahadur 1880/1915, born 1848, succeeded 11 June 1880 (#1), married 1stly, 1876, Bibi Gauhar Khanum Saheb, married 2ndly, 1882, Bibi Khurshid Jahan Begum. He died 21 January 1915.
- HH Najum-ud-Daulah Mumtaz-ul-Mulk Momin Khan Bahadur Dilawar Jung Nawab Mirza HUSAIN YAWAR KHAN II Bahadur 1915/- , born 16 May 1911, educated at Rajkumar College, Rajkot; married January 1936, Nawabzadi Safia Sultan Qizilbash, daughter of Nawab Sir Fateh Ali Khan Qizilbash of Lahore (see Nawabganj), and had issue.
- HH Najum-ud-Daulah Mumtaz-ul-Mulk Momin Khan Bahadur Dilawar Jung Nawab Mirza MUHAMMED JA'AFAR ALI KHAN

== See also ==
- Political integration of India
- Princely State
- Baroda and Gujarat States Agency
