= Shadi Beg =

Khan of the Golden Horde from 1399 to 1407

Shādī Beg
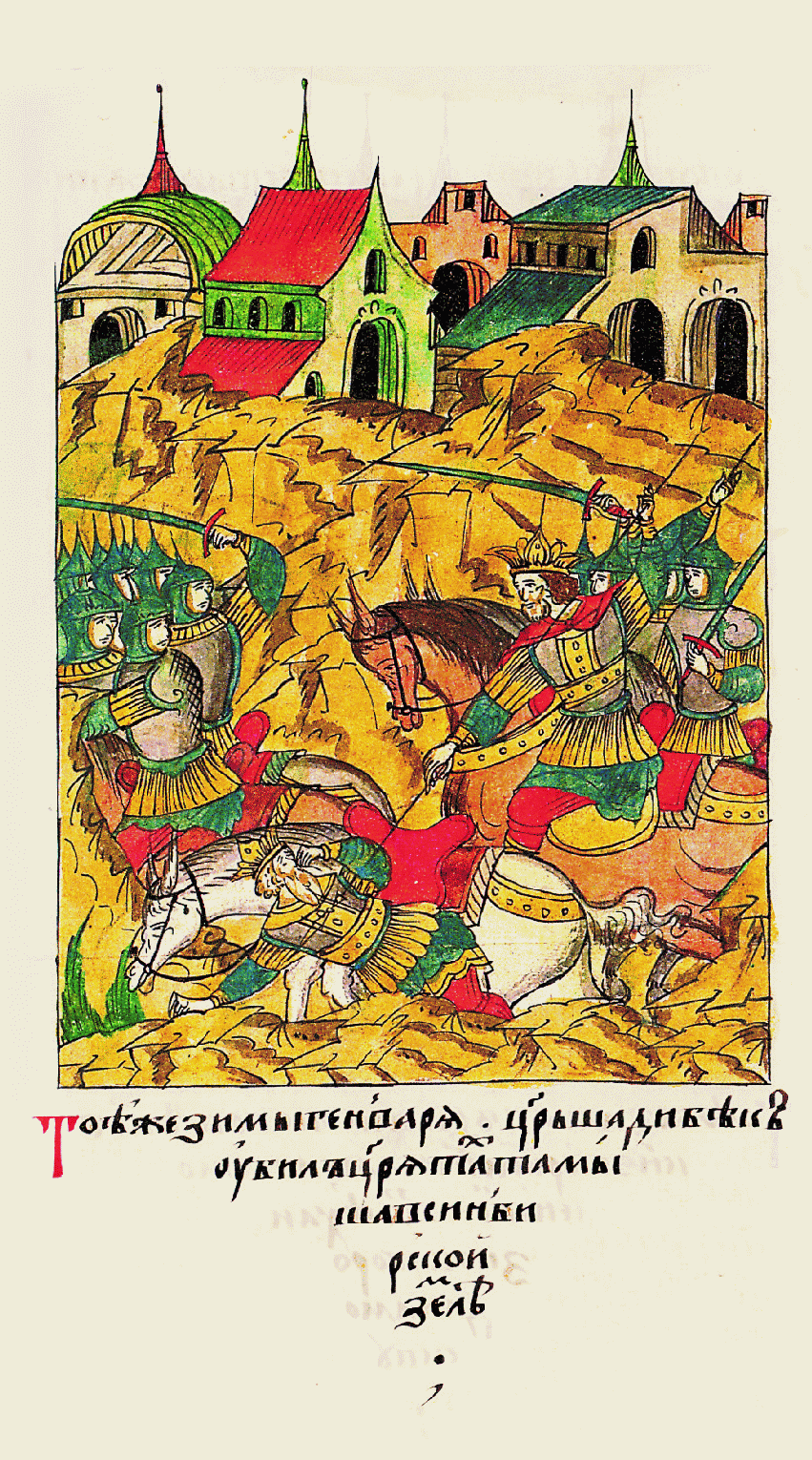
- Shādī Beg slays Tokhtamysh, miniature from the Illustrated Chronicle of Ivan the Terrible, 16th century

Khan of the Golden Horde
- Reign: 1399–1407
- Predecessor: Tīmūr Qutluq
- Successor: Pūlād
- Died: 1409
- Dynasty: Borjigin
- Father: Qutlū Beg
- Religion: Islam

Shādī Beg (Persian: شادی بیگ; Turki/Kypchak: شادی بک) was Khan of the Golden Horde from 1399 to 1407. He was the protégé of the all-powerful beglerbeg, Edigu.

== Ancestry ==
According to the Muʿizz al-ansāb and the Tawārīḫ-i guzīdah-i nuṣrat-nāmah, Shādī Beg was a son of Qutlū Beg, and thus a first cousin of his predecessor Tīmūr Qutluq. Both descended from Tuqa-Timur, the son of Jochi, the son of Chinggis Khan.

== Reign ==
On the death of his cousin, Tīmūr Qutluq, allegedly from drunkenness, Shādī Beg was made khan by the beglerbeg Edigu, in late 1399 or early 1400. Edigu may have considered Shādī Beg's youth and inexperience likely to ensure the beglerbeg's continued hold on power. The Russian prince Ivan Mihajlovič was invested with the Grand Principality of Tver' by Shādī Beg in 1400. Edigu focused on his vendetta against the former khan Tokhtamysh, waging war against him in Sibir in 1400–1406, lasting for most of Shādī Beg's reign. In the early winter of 1406, Edigu's troops succeeded in attacking and killing Tokhtamysh on the Tobol River. Also in 1406, Shādī Beg supported the grand prince of Moscow Vasilij I Dmitrievič by sending a force to assist the Muscovites against Lithuania. Vasilij had evaded both sending regular tribute to the khan and traveling to the khan's court, although he had given Shādī Beg's envoy, his treasurer, gifts for the khan in 1405.

As khan, Shādī Beg claimed responsibility for the victory over Tokhtamysh, and apparently became increasingly dissatisfied with his position as a puppet monarch. He began to plot the elimination of Edigu, but the powerful beglerbeg discovered it on time and anticipated it, in late 1407. Shādī Beg fled, first to (old) Astrakhan, then to Shirvan. Here, Shādī Beg received asylum from the local ruler (Shirwānshāh) Ibrāhīm, who recognized him as khan and issued coins in his name until 1409. Edigu, who had made Tīmūr Qutluq's son Pūlād khan in Shādī Beg's place, demanded the fugitive khan's extradition, but was met with refusal. However, in 1409, Edigu's agents succeeded in murdering Shādī Beg at Shamakhi.

== Descendants ==
Shādī Beg had several children, most notably Ghiyāth ad-Dīn, who claimed the throne of the Golden Horde after 1421, holding Bolghar in 1423-1425 and Sarai in 1425-1426. Ghiyāth ad-Dīn's son Muṣṭafā also claimed the throne, from (old) Astrakhan, in 1431-1433; he died in 1464.

== Genealogy ==
- Genghis Khan
- Jochi
- Tuqa-Timur
- Kay-Timur
- Abay
- Numqan
- Qutlugh Beg
- Shadi Beg

== See also ==
- List of khans of the Golden Horde

== Bibliography ==
- Gaev, A. G., "Genealogija i hronologija Džučidov," Numizmatičeskij sbornik 3 (2002) 9-55.
- Howorth, H. H., History of the Mongols from the 9th to the 19th Century. Part II.1. London, 1880.
- Počekaev, R. J., Cari ordynskie: Biografii hanov i pravitelej Zolotoj Ordy. Saint Petersburg, 2010.
- Sabitov, Ž. M., Genealogija "Tore", Astana, 2008.
- Tizengauzen, V. G. (trans.), Sbornik materialov otnosjaščihsja k istorii Zolotoj Ordy. Izvlečenija iz persidskih sočinenii, republished as Istorija Kazahstana v persidskih istočnikah. 4. Almaty, 2006.

Regnal titles
| Preceded by Tīmūr Qutluq | Khan of the Golden Horde; 1399–1407 | Succeeded by Pūlād |
