= News Outdoor Group =

Russian outdoor advertising operator

News Outdoor Group was at the largest outdoor advertising company in Eastern Europe, a subsidiary of News Corp. NewsCorp entered the OOH advertising market in 1999 and NOG has since become the leading emerging market OOH advertising company in the world. NOG has more than 4,500 employees and operates approximately 60,000 advertising displays in more than 300 cities spread across 13 time zones. Its biggest city - and company headquarters - was Moscow, Russia.

The company continually expanded operations throughout Eastern and Central European countries including Bulgaria, Czech Republic, Romania and Ukraine.

The company's main advertising products include billboards, illuminated panels, benches, bus shelters, Unique boards, Airport transit advertising, and In-store POS (shopping mall, supermarket) displays.

News Outdoor is selling off its divisions. News Outdoor Bulgaria was sold to Novacorp, News Outdoor Ukraine was sold to an undisclosed buyer, and News Outdoor Russia and News Outdoor Romania were sold to investors led by VTB Capital.

== Holdings ==
- News Outdoor Czech Republic
