= Kadaura =

- town
- Location in Uttar Pradesh, India Kadaura (India)
- Coordinates: 25.98°N 79.85°E
- Country: India
- State: Uttar Pradesh
- District: Jalaun
- Founder: Ansh Gupta
- Elevation: 123 m (404 ft)

Population (2001)
  - Total: 12,658

Languages
  - Official: Hindi
- Time zone: UTC+5:30 (IST)
- PIN: 285203
- Telephone code: 05164
- Vehicle registration: UP 92
- Website: up.gov.in

Kadaura is a town and a Nagar Panchayat in Jalaun District in the Indian state of Uttar Pradesh. During the British Raj, Kadaura was the capital of an 11-gun salute princely state.

== History ==
During the British Raj era, Kadaura was the capital of Baoni State. It was one of several princely states of the Bundelkhand Agency and was ruled by descendants of the Asaf Jahi ruling family of former Hyderabad State.

== Geography ==
Kadaura is located at 25.98°N 79.85°E. It has an average elevation of 124meters

== Demographics ==
As of 2001 India census, Kadaura had a population of 12,658. Males constitute 53% of the population and females 47%. Kadaura has an average literacy rate of 67%, higher than the national average of 59.5%: male literacy is 65%, and female literacy is 48%. In Kadaura, 16% of the population is under 6 years of age. Kadaura market is small.

== Cuisine ==
The main cuisine eaten here is Rice, Daal and Roti.

== Culture ==
Culture is mainly Hindu & Muslim, owing to its past of being a Muslim State, although Hindus live in equal peace and harmony.
