= Sanjamala =

- Village
- Interactive map of Sanjamala
- Location in Andhra Pradesh, India
- Coordinates: 15°08′55″N 78°17′58″E
- Country: India
- State: Andhra Pradesh
- District: Nandyal
- Elevation: 181 m (594 ft)

Languages
  - Official: Telugu
- Time zone: UTC+5:30 (IST)
- Postal code: 518186
- Vehicle registration: AP

Sanjamala or Sanjemula is a village in Nandyal district of Andhra Pradesh, India. It is located in Sanjamala mandal. There is a temple called Venkateswara Swamy Temple. There is only one government school. Its old name is Chenchelimala.

In July 2025, a pilot road project using Danish Asphalt Fibre Reinforcement Technology was started in Sanjamala.
