= Nawab of Masulipatnam =

The Nawabs of Masulipatam (now Machilipatnam) ruled under the Nizam in eastern India. The best known of them was Nawab Haji Hassan Khan. Prior to the arrival of European traders in the region Masulipatnam was under the rule of the local Nawab.

Their title later became Nawab of Banganapalle as they shifted from Masulipatam to Banganapalle. They belong to the Najm-i-Sani Dynasty.

== List of nawabs ==
The Najm-i-Sani dynasty

Nawab	reign
Nawab Ali Quli Khan Bahadur	
Nawab Muhammad Taqi Khan Bahadur	
Nawab Hasan Ali Khan Bahadur	(1731–1771)
Subhan Bakhsh	(1771–1799)
Qutb ud-Daula	(1799–1821)
Nawab Muhammad Ali Khan Bahadur	(1821–1853)
Nawab Daud Ali Khan Bahadur	(1853–1883)
Nawab Husain Ali Khan Bahadur	(1883–?)
Nawab Jaafar Ali Khan Bahadur	

== See also ==
- Nawab of Banganapalle
- Nizam of Hyderabad
- Nawab of Carnatic
