= Najm-i-Sani dynasty =

Najm-i-Sani Najam-es-Sani
- Dynasty
- Country: British Raj
- Founded: 1658
- Founder: Nawab Ali Quli Khan Bahadur
- Final ruler: The Nawabs who ruled Cambay State
- Titles: Nawab
- Estates: Banganapalle; Masulipatnam; Cambay

The Najm-i-Sani dynasty (also spelled Najam-es-Sani) was a Muslim dynasty of rulers in India. It is founded by Nawab Ali Quli Khan Bahadur, who was minister to Emperor Aurangzeb (reigned 1658 to 1707), and founder of the following lines:

- The first dynasty of Nawabs of Banganapalle, (before 1665 to 1769)
- The Nawabs of Masulipatam, (before 1731 to after 1883)
- The Cambay State.
