= Banaganapalli =

Banaganapalli Bangina palli
- Town
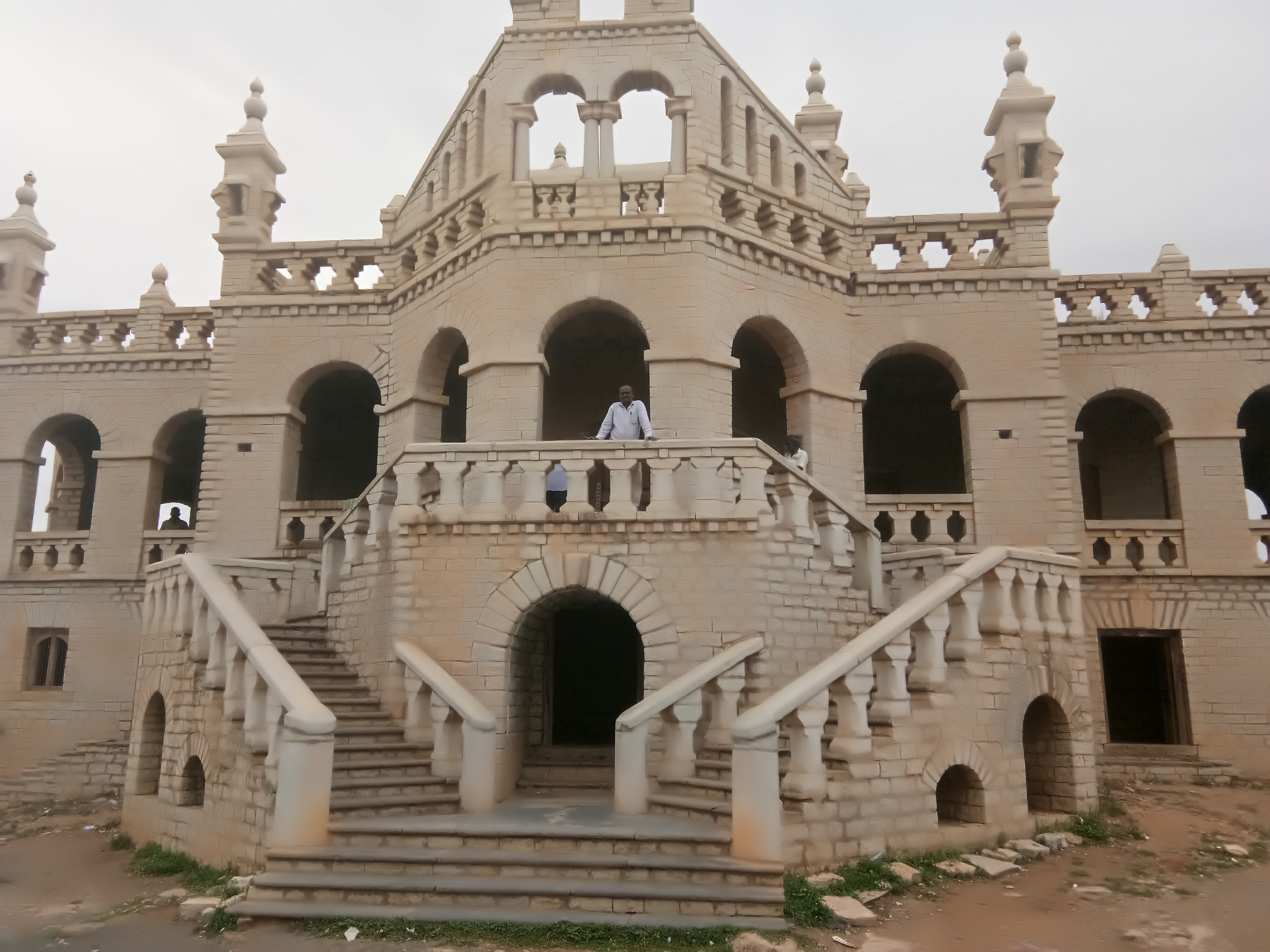
- Nawab's Palace, Arundati Kota
- Nickname: Mango Town
- Location in Andhra Pradesh, India
- Coordinates: 15.3167°N 78.2333°E
- Country: India
- State: Andhra Pradesh
- District: Nandyal

Government
  - Type: Grama Panchayat
- Elevation: 209 m (686 ft)

Population (2011)
  - Total: 36,056

Languages
  - Official: Telugu & Urdu
- Time zone: UTC+5:30 (IST)
- Postal code: 518124
- Vehicle registration: AP 21, AP39
- Website: https://kalagnani.com

Banaganapalli is a town in the state of Andhra Pradesh, India. It lies in Nandyal district, 38 km west of the city of Nandyal. Banaganapalli is famous for its mangoes and has a cultivar, Banaganapalli, named after it. Between 1790 and 1948, Banaganapalli was the capital of the princely state of the same name, Banganapalle State.

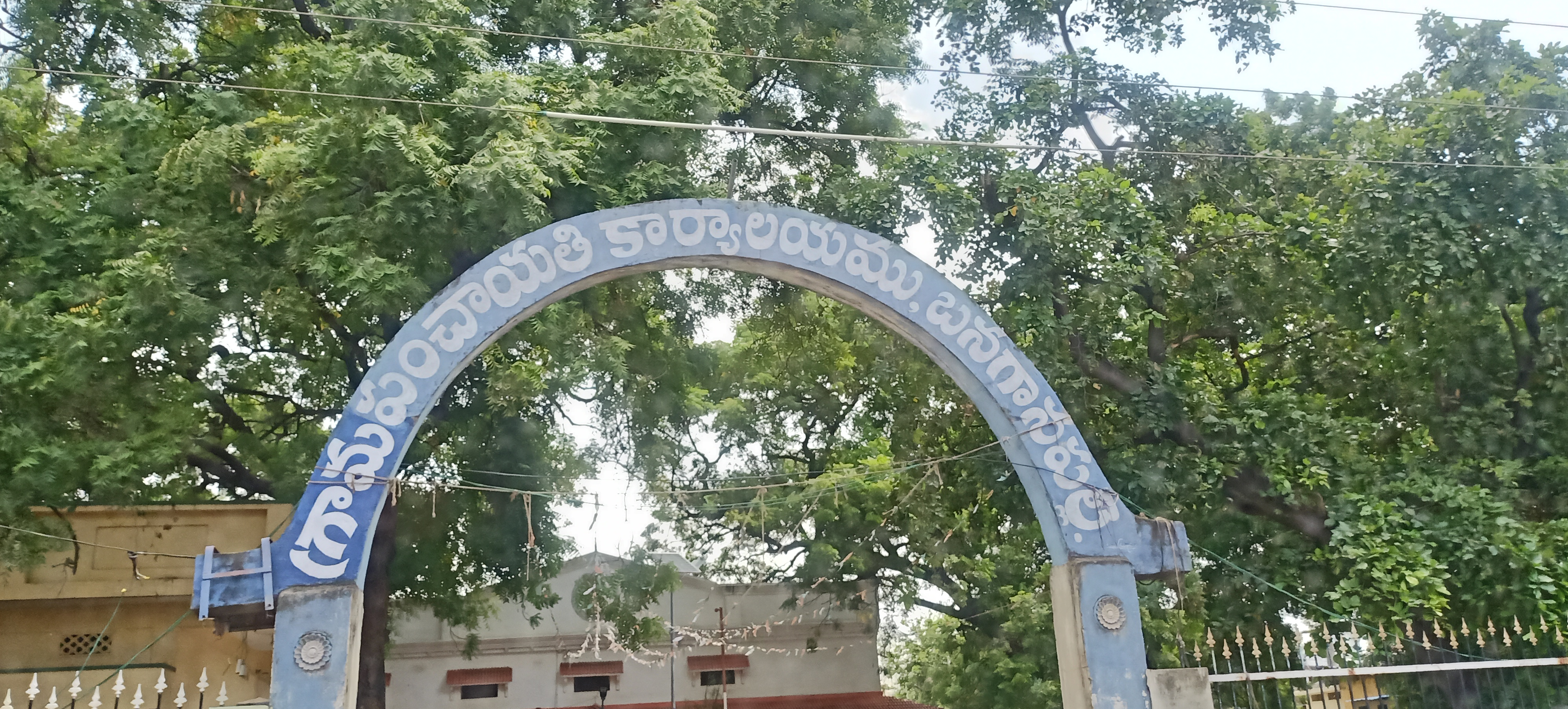
Banaganapalli Gram panchayat

== Geography ==
Banaganapalli is located at 15.3167°N 78.2333°E. It has an average elevation of 209 metres (688 ft).

Betamcherla, Banaganapalli and Koilakuntla are called Twin towns.

Right Canal of Srisailam Dam SRBC passes near Banaganapalli Town.

== History ==
Map of the princely state of Banaganapalle, 1893

=== Banaganapalle Nawabs ===
In 1601, Sultan Ismail Adil Shah of Bijapur conquered the fortress of Banaganapalli from Raja Nanda Chakravathy. The fort and surrounding districts were placed under the control of his victorious general, Siddhu Sumbal, who held them until 1665. Muhammad Beg Khan-e Rosebahani was granted Banaganapalli and the surrounding jagir in perpetual fiefdom but died without a male heir, leaving the jagir of Banaganapalli to his adopted son, Faiz Ali Khan Bahadur. Aurangzeb conquered the Sultanate of Bijapur in 1686, but Faiz Ali Khan's fief was secured by the intervention of his maternal uncle Mubariz Khan, who served as Aurangzeb's viceroy of the Deccan. Banaganapalli was an independent state under the rule of Nawabs until 1947.

=== Sri Kalagnani Jagadguru Madvirat Pothuluri Veerabrahmendra Swamy ===
Sri Pothuluri Veera Brahmendra Swamy wrote Kalagnanam on the hill of Ravvala konda, near Banaganapalli. Sri Kalagnani Jagadguru Madvirat Pothuluri Veerabrahmendra Swamy is one of the great saints of India. He has the knowledge of past, present and future. He is often called as the "Nostradamus of India". His forecastings of which all were proved correct. He forecasts events from his reign to the end of Kaliyuga. He lived 400 years ago. This is known because of the statue which is present in his Ashrama in Banaganapalle. He has written many books on palm leaves. All these palm leaf books tell the future of the world till the end of Kaliyuga. These books tell us about how people get transformed in coming years. He forecasts the changes in political, social, and economic changes that will occur in society, biological and physiological changes that will occur in the plant and animal kingdoms, geographical changes, wars, explosions, etc. And many other wonders of the world which have occurred, such as birth of Mr. Gandhi and his freedom movement and the rule of Mrs. Indira Gandhi in free India. The knowledge in these books is called as Kalagnanam (Knowledge of Time). This will also be called by people as "Sandhra Sindhu Vedam".

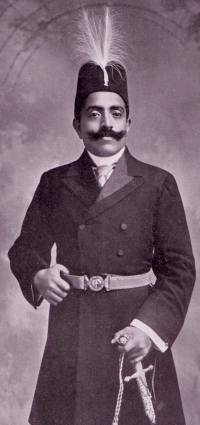
Banaganapalle Nawab

== Demographics ==
As of the 2011 census, the town had a population of 36,056. Banaganapalle is tenth-most populous town in Kurnool district.

Religions in Banaganapalle
Religion	Percent
Hindus	51.63%
Muslims	47.11%
Others	1.25%

== Economy ==
- Banaganapalli primarily depend on Agriculture. Some Industries are also present in Banaganapalle.
- Maha Cements factory is located in Yanakandla Village, near Banaganapalle.
- Stone mining is present in Palukuru Village of Banaganapalle Mandal.

== Governance ==
The town was upgraded from Gram panchayat to Nagar panchayat on 23 June 2011. Later again it is degraded to Grama Panchayt due to some reasons. Now administration is under the Sarpanch.

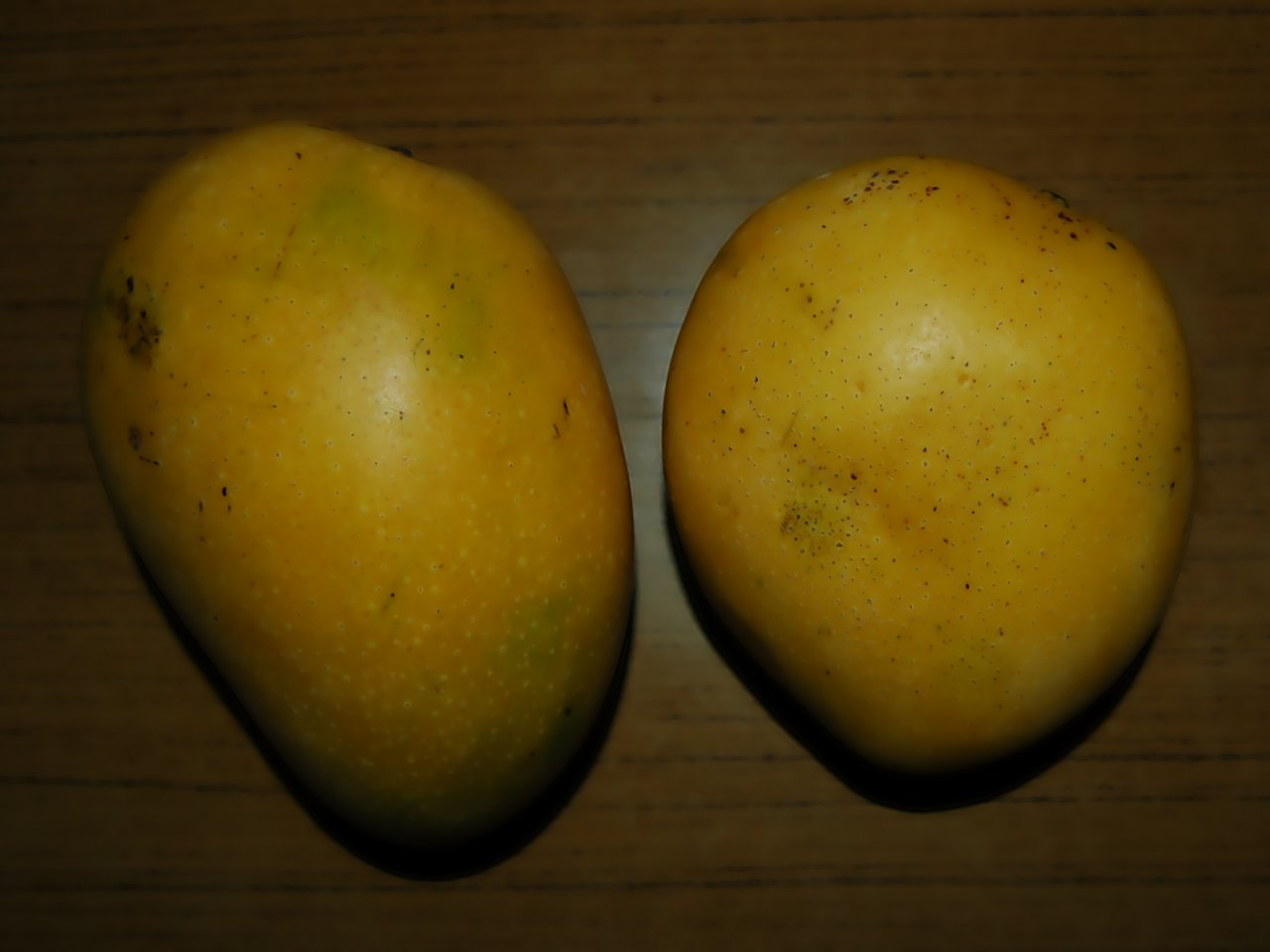
Banganapalle mangoes, illustrating variations in shape and size commonly found.

Governance
Department	Incharge
Legislative	Banaganapalle MLA, Banaganapalle Sarpanch
Executive	Dhone RDO, Banaganapalle MRO
Judiciary	Hon'ble Banaganapalle Court Judge
Police Sub Division	Dhone DSP
Health	CHNC Banaganapalle
APSPDCL Division	Dhone DE
APSRTC Bus Service	Banaganapalle Depot
Transport	Nandyal RTO
Pincode	518124, 518176, 518186

== Banganapalli mangoes ==
- Banaganapalli mango is a mango variety generally known as The King of Mangoes, named after Banganapalli.
- An unspoilt obliquely oval specimen presents an unblemished golden yellow thin edible skin. These mangoes are large, weighing on an average 350-400 grams. The pulp is fibreless, firm and yellow with sweet taste.
- Banaganapalle Mangoes received a geographical indication tag in May 2017. Banaganapalle mangoes have been grown for over 100 years in Andhra Pradesh.

== Transport ==
=== Roadways ===
The Andhra Pradesh State Road Transport Corporation operates bus services from Banaganapalle bus station with Banaganapalle Bus depot.

=== Distance to Major towns and cities ===
1. Nandyal = 37 km
2. Kurnool = 75 km
3. Adoni = 130 km
4. Koilakuntla = 15 km
5. Bethamcherla = 20 km
6. Dhone = 47 km
7. Proddatur = 94 km
8. Kadapa = 128 km
9. Tirupati = 268 km
10. Hyderabad = 293 km
11. Bengaluru = 339 km
12. Vijayawada = 354 km
13. Chennai = 401 km

=== Railways ===
Banaganapalli Railway Station opened in 2016. It is part of the Nandyal - Yerraguntla Railway line.

== Places of interest ==
- Yaganti
- Mahanandi
- Belum Caves
- daddanala project
- Asthana tea
- Uyyalawada Narasimha Reddy Park
- Arundati Kota

== Education ==
The primary and secondary school education is imparted by government, aided and private schools, under the School Education Department of the state. The medium of instruction followed by different schools are Telugu and English.

== See also ==
- Banganapalle State
- Nawab of Banganapalle
