= Banganapalle State =

Princely state of India (1665–1948)

Coordinates: 15.3167°N 78.2333°E

Banganapalle State బనగానపల్లె
- Princely State
- 1764–1948
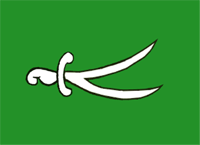
- Flag

- Map of the princely state of Banganapalle, 1893
- Area
  - 1901: 712 km^{2} (275 sq mi)
- Population
  - 1901: 32,279
- History
  - Established: 1764
  - Accession to the Union of India: 23 February 1948
Preceded by	Succeeded by
Hyderabad State	India
- Today part of: Andhra Pradesh, India

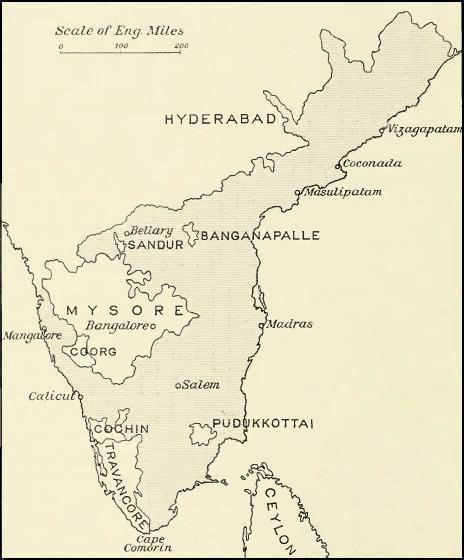
1913 map of the Madras Presidency showing location of the Banganapalle State

Banganapalle was one of the princely states of India during the period of the British Raj. The state was founded in 1665 and had its capital in Banganapalle. Its rulers were Shia Muslims and the last one signed the accession to the Indian Union on 23 February 1948.

The Mughal Emperor Aurangzeb granted Banganapalle as an estate to Muhammed Beg Khan during the 17th century, and was passed down in the latter's family for three generations before Fazil Ali Khan II died without a male heir. Nizam Ali Khan then granted Banganapalle as an estate to Saiyid Husain Ali Khan in 1764. Suzerainty was transferred from the Nizam to the British in 1800. Due to internal disorder, the British managed Banganapalle directly between 1825 and 1848, when the Governor of Madras renewed the grant.

== List of Rulers ==
- 1686 - 1725: Muhammad Beg Khan-i-lung
- 1725 - 1728: Ata Khan
- 1728 - 1737: Fazil `Ali Khan I
- 1737 - 1764: Fazil `Ali Khan II
- 1764 - 26 Aug 1783: Saiyid Husain `Ali Khan
- 26 Aug 1783 - 1790: Ghulam `Ali Khan I (1st time)
- 1784 - 1790: Muhammad Yusuf (Mysore Governor)
- 1790 - 1814: Mozaffar al-Molk Asad `Ali Khan
- 1790 - 8 Sep 1822: Ghulam `Ali Khan I (2nd time)
- 8 Sep 1822 - Oct 1835: Husain `Ali Khan (1st time)
- 1825 - 12 Jul 1848: annexed to British India
- 12 Jul 1848 - 1848: Husain `Ali Khan (2nd time)
- 20 Mar 1849 - 7 Oct 1868: Ghulam Mohammad `Ali Khan II
- 7 Oct 1868 - 21 Apr 1905: Fath `Ali Khan
- 1 Feb 1905 - 19 Dec 1908: John Chartres Molony -Administrator (assistant political agent)
- 22 Jun 1905 - 22 Jan 1922: Ghulam `Ali Khan III
- 22 Jan 1922 - 23 Feb 1948: Fazli `Ali Khan III

== See also ==
- Nawab of Masulipatam
- Masulipatam
- Nizam of Hyderabad
- Formation of Andhra Pradesh
