= List of princely states of British India (by region) =

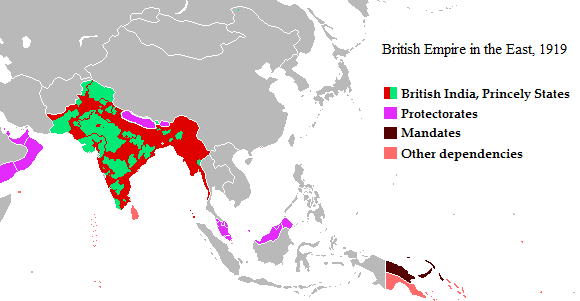
British India Princely states Protectorates Mandates Other dependencies

Before the partition of India in 1947, about 584 princely states, also called "native states", existed in India. These were not part of British India, the parts of the Indian subcontinent which were under direct British administration, but rather under indirect rule, subject to subsidiary alliances.

Things moved quickly after the partition of British India in 1947. By the end of 1949, all of the states had chosen to accede to one of the newly independent states of India or Pakistan or else had been conquered and annexed.

== Overview ==
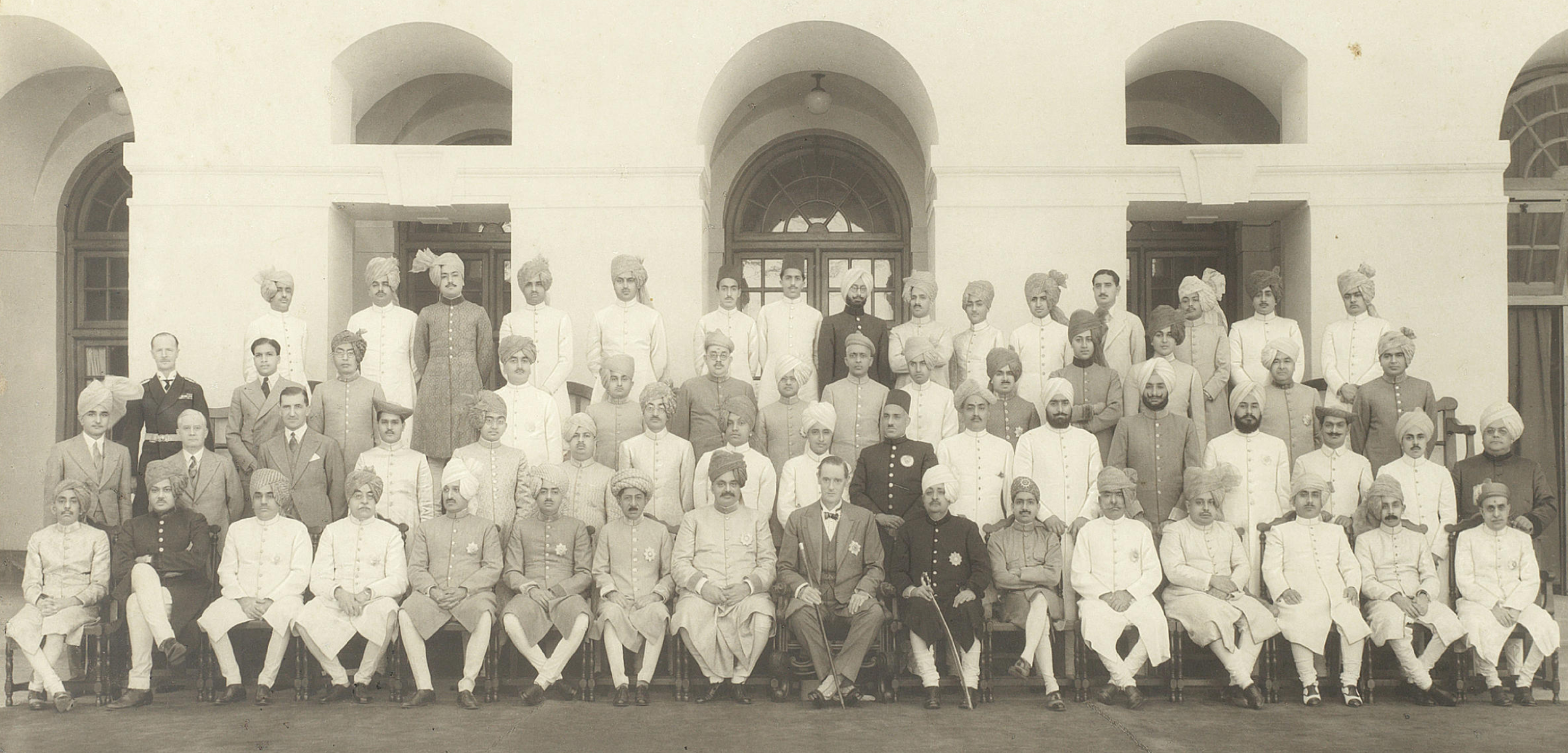
Chamber of Princes meeting in 1941

In principle, the princely states had internal autonomy, while by treaty the British Crown had suzerainty and was responsible for the states' external affairs. In practice, while the states were indeed ruled by potentates with a variety of titles, the British still had considerable influence.

By the time of the departure of the British in 1947, only four of the largest of the states still had their own British resident, a diplomatic title for advisors present in the states' capitals, while most of the others were grouped together into agencies, such as the Central India Agency, the Deccan States Agency, and the Rajputana Agency.

Starting in 1920, the states were represented in the Chamber of Princes, which held its meetings in New Delhi.

The most important states were ranked as salute states, whose rulers were entitled to a given number of salute guns.

By the Indian Independence Act 1947, the British gave up their suzerainty of the states and left each of them free to choose whether to join one of the newly independent countries of India and Pakistan or to remain outside them. For a short time, some of the rulers explored the possibility of a federation of the states separate from either, but this came to nothing. Most of the states then decided to accede to India or to Pakistan, such as Junagadh (1947–1948), Bilaspur on 12 October 1948, and Bhopal on 1 May 1949. Travancore also chose to remain an independent country.

Hyderabad State was the largest which chose to remain independent. In Operation Polo, in September 1948, it was invaded and annexed by India.

In Jammu and Kashmir, a state with a Muslim majority but a Hindu ruler, the Maharaja hoped to remain independent but acceded to India on 27 October 1947 at the outset of the invasion of Jammu and Kashmir by Pakistan — leading to the Indo-Pakistani War of 1947.

On 31 March 1948, Kalat acceded to Pakistan, although the brother of the Khan led a rebellion against this decision.

== Princely states at the time of independence and partition on 15 August 1947 ==
=== Individual residencies ===
Map	Name of state	British resident	Now part of	Last ruler
	Hyderabad	Individual residency	Telangana, Maharashtra and Karnataka, India	Mir Osman Ali Khan
	Jammu and Kashmir	Individual residency	Jammu and Kashmir and Ladakh, India; Azad Kashmir and Gilgit-Baltistan, Pakistan; Aksai Chin and Trans-Karakoram Tract, China	Hari Singh
	Mysore	Individual residency	Karnataka, India	Jayachamarajendra Wadiyar
	Travancore	Individual residency status under Madras Presidency	Kerala and 5 taluks (Kanyakumari district) of Tamil Nadu, India	Chithira Thirunal Balarama Varma

=== Baluchistan Agency ===
Princely states of the Baluchistan Agency.

Map	Name of state	British resident	Now part of	Last ruler
	Kalat	Baluchistan Agency	Balochistan, Pakistan	Mir Ahmad Yar Khan Ahmedzai
	(State of Kharan) Kharan	Baluchistan Agency	Balochistan, Pakistan	Habibullah Khan
	Las Bela	Baluchistan Agency	Balochistan, Pakistan	Jam Ghulam Qadir Khan
	(State of Makran) Makran	Baluchistan Agency	Balochistan, Pakistan	Bai Khan Baloch Gikchi

=== Deccan States Agency and Kolhapur Residency (Maratha) ===
Princely states of Deccan States Agency and Kolhapur Residency (Maratha).

Name of state	British Resident or Agent	Now part of	Last or present ruler
Akkalkot	Princely State	Maharashtra, India	Shrimant Malojiraje Bhosle
Aundh	Princely State	Maharashtra, India	Bhawanrao Shriniwasrao Pant Pratinidhi
Bhor	Princely State	Maharashtra, India	Raghunathrao Shankarrao Pandit Pant Sachiv, Raja of Bhor
Jamkhandi	Princely State	Karnataka, India	Saheb Shrimant Raja Pranay Rao Parshuram Rao Patwardhan
Janjira	Princely State	Maharashtra, India	Sidi Muhammed Khan II Sidi Ahmad Khan, Nawab of Janjira
Jath	Princely State	Maharashtra, India	Lt. Shrimant Raja Vijaysinghrao Ramrao Babasaheb Dafle
Kolhapur	Princely State	Maharashtra, India	Rajadhiraj Chhatrapati Shahu II Bhosle
Ichalkaranji	Princely State	Maharashtra, India	Shrimant Govindrao (Abasaheb) Ghorpade
Kurundvad Senior	Princely State	Maharashtra, India	Shrimant Bhalchandrarao Chintamanrao Patwardhan, Raja of Kurundwad Sr.
Kurundvad Junior	Princely State	Maharashtra, India	Shrimant Hariharrao Raghunathrao Bapusaheb Patwardhan, Raja of Kurundwad Jr.
Miraj Junior	Princely State	Maharashtra, India	Madhavrao Hariharrao Patwardhan
Miraj Senior	Princely State	Maharashtra, India	Narayan Rao Jatya Sahib Patwardhan
Mudhol	Princely State	Karnataka, India	Shrimant Raja Bhairavsinhrao Malojirao Ghorpade II
Phaltan	Princely State	Maharashtra, India	Shrimant Ramraje Prataosinha Naik-Nimbalkar
Sangli	Princely State	Maharashtra, India	Chintamanrao Dhundirao Patwardhan
Savanur	Princely State	Karnataka, India	Nawab of Savanur, Abdul Majid Khan II
Sawantvadi	Princely State	Maharashtra, India	Raja Khem Sawant-Bhosle Bahadur

=== Gwalior Residency ===
Princely states of the Gwalior Residency.

Name of state	British Resident or Agent	Now part of	Last or present ruler
Gwalior	Princely State	Madhya Pradesh, India	Shrimant Jyotiraditya Scindia
Garha	Princely State	Madhya Pradesh, India	
Khaniyadhana	Princely State	Madhya Pradesh, India	
Ramgadi	Princely State	Uttar Pradesh, India	Diwan Mahadev Mishra
Rajgarh State	Princely State	Madhya Pradesh, India	Maharani Shushila Sinha Rudrani
Rampur	Princely State	Uttar Pradesh, India	Raza Ali Khan of Rampur
Benares State	Princely State	Uttar Pradesh, India	Maharaja Vibhuti Narayan Singh

=== Madras Presidency ===
Princely states of the Madras Presidency.

Name of state	British Resident or Agent	Now part of	Last or present ruler
Banganapalle	Princely State	Andhra Pradesh, India	Sayyid Fazl-i-'Ali Khan IV Bahadur
Cochin	Princely State	Kerala, India	Rama Varma Pareekshit Thampuran
Pudukkottai	Princely State	Tamil Nadu, India	Rajagopala Tondaiman
Sandur	Princely State	Karnataka, India	Yeshwantrao Ghorpade

=== North-West Frontier States Agency ===
Princely states of the North-West Frontier States Agency. Agencies included the Dir, Swat, and Chitral Agency, and the Deputy Commissioner of Hazara acting as the political agent for Amb and Phulra.

Map	Name of state	British resident	Now part of	Last ruler
	Amb	North-West Frontier States Agency	Khyber Pakhtunkhwa, Pakistan	Nawab Muhammad Farid Khan Tanoli
	Chitral	North-West Frontier States Agency	Khyber Pakhtunkhwa, Pakistan	Mehtar Saif-ul-Mulk Nasir
	Dir	North-West Frontier States Agency	Khyber Pakhtunkhwa, Pakistan	Muhammad Shah Khosru Khan
	Phulra	North-West Frontier States Agency	Khyber Pakhtunkhwa, Pakistan	Nawab Abdul Latif Khan Tanoli
	Swat	North-West Frontier States Agency	Khyber Pakhtunkhwa, Pakistan	Wali Miangul Jahan Zeb

=== Gilgit Agency ===
The States of Hunza and Nagar and many feudal Jagirs (Puniyal, Shigar, etc.) in the Gilgit Agency were tributary to the Maharaja of Jammu & Kashmir.

Name of state	British resident	Now part of	Last ruler
Hunza	Gilgit Agency	Gilgit–Baltistan, Pakistan	Mohammad Jamal Khan
Nagar	Gilgit Agency	Gilgit–Baltistan, Pakistan	Showkat Ali Khan

=== Province of Sind ===
Name of state	British resident	Now part of	Last or present ruler
Khairpur	Sind Province	Sindh, Pakistan	George Ali Murad Khan
Amarkot	Sind Province	Sindh, Pakistan	Rana Arjun Singh

=== Punjab States Agency ===
States of the Punjab States Agency (Punjab).

Name of state	British Resident or Agent	Now part of	Last or present ruler
(Bahawalpur (princely state)) Bahawalpur	Princely State	Punjab, Pakistan	Sadeq Mohammad Khan V
Bilaspur	Princely State	Himachal Pradesh, India	Anand Chand
Faridkot	Princely State	Punjab, India	Harinder Singh
Jind	Princely State	Punjab and Haryana, India	Satbir Singh
Kalsia	Princely State	Haryana, India	Ravisher Singh
Kangra	Princely State	Himachal Pradesh, India	Aditya Dev Chand Katoch
Kapurthala	Princely State	Punjab, India	Jagatjit Singh
Kumharsain	Princely State	Himachal Pradesh, India	Rana Surendra Singh
Loharu State	Princely State	Haryana, India	Amin ud-din Ahmad Khan
Malerkotla	Princely State	Punjab, India	Ahmad Ali Khan
Mandi	Princely State	Himachal Pradesh, India	Joginder Sen
Nabha	Princely State	Punjab, India	Pratap Singh of Nabha
Patiala	Princely State	Punjab, India	Yadavindra Singh
Rajgarh	Princely State	Himachal Pradesh, India	Maharani Sushila Sinha
Sirmur	Princely State	Himachal Pradesh, India	Rajendra Prakash
Suket/Sundernagar	Princely State	Himachal Pradesh, India	Hari Sen
Siba	Princely State	Himachal Pradesh, India	Ashok K. Thakur
Tharoch	Princely State	Himachal Pradesh, India	Rana Rakesh Singh
Tehri Garhwal	Princely State (Zamindari)	Uttarakhand, India	Manabendra Shah

=== Rajputana Agency ===
States of the Rajputana Agency.

Name of state	British Resident or Agent	Now part of	Last or present ruler
Alwar	Princely State	Rajasthan, India	Sawai Tej Singh Naruka
Banswara	Princely State	Rajasthan, India	Jagmal Singh II
Bharatpur	Princely State	Rajasthan, India	Brijendra Singh
Bikaner	Princely State	Rajasthan, India	Sadul Singh
Bundi	Princely State	Rajasthan, India	Bahadur Singh
Dholpur	Princely State	Rajasthan, India	Hemant Singh
Dungarpur	Princely State	Rajasthan, India	Laxman Singh
Jaipur	Princely State	Rajasthan, India	Sawai Man Singh II
Jaisalmer	Princely State	Rajasthan, India	Jawahir Singh
Jhalawar	Princely State	Rajasthan, India	Harish Chandra Singh
Jodhpur	Princely State	Rajasthan, India	Hanwant Singh
Karauli	Princely State	Rajasthan, India	Ganesh Pal Deo
Kishangarh	Princely State	Rajasthan, India	Sumer Singh
Kotah	Princely State	Rajasthan, India	Bhim Singh II
Kushalgarh	Princely State	Rajasthan, India	Rao Harendra Singh
Sardargarh	Princely State	Rajasthan, India	
Mewar	Princely State	Rajasthan, India	Bhupal Singh
Patan, Rajasthan	Princely State	Rajasthan, India	Rao Bir Bikram Singh
Pratabgarh	Princely State	Rajasthan, India	Ram Singh
Shekhawati	Princely State	Rajasthan, India	Shri Maharao Sheoraj Singh
Shahpura	Princely State	Rajasthan, India	Sudershan Singh
Sirohi	Princely State	Rajasthan, India	Maharao Raghubir Singh
Tonk	Princely State	Rajasthan, India	Muhammad Faruq Ali Khan

=== Gujarat States Agency and Baroda Residency ===
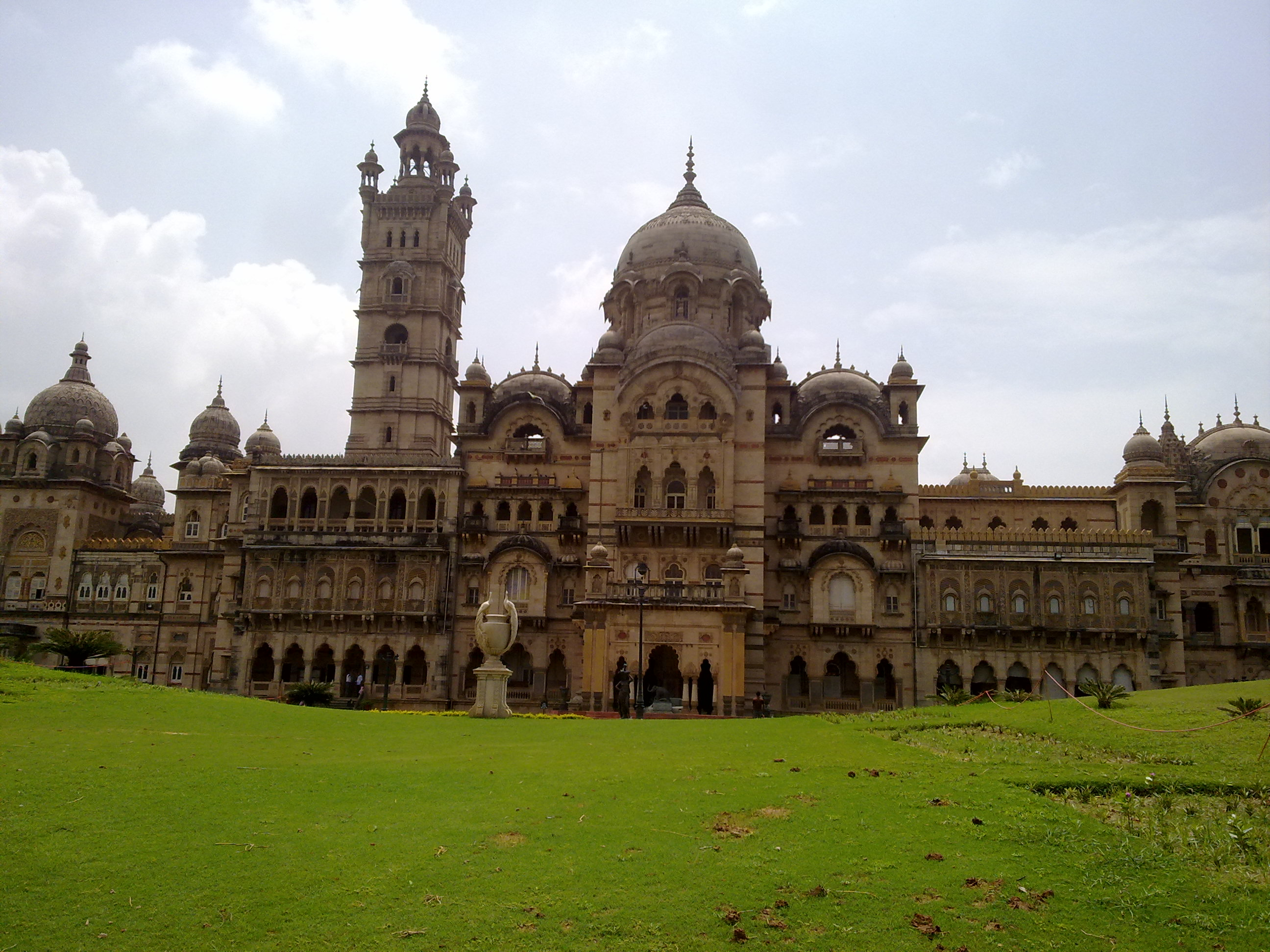
The Majestic Laxmi Vilas Palace of Baroda, built by the Maratha Maharaja Sayajirao Gaekwad III

- Bajana
- Bansda State
- Manavadar
- Baroda
- Bhavnagar
- Cambay
- Chhota Udaipur
- Cutch
- Charkha
- Dangs
- Dhrangadhra
- Dhrol
- Gondal
- Gamph
- Idar
- Jamnagar
- Jawhar
- Junagadh
- Lathi
- Limbda
- Limdi
- Lunavada
- Morvi
- Muli
- Nawanagar
- Palanpur
- Palitana State
- Porbandar State
- Poshina
- Radhanpur
- Rajkot
- Rajpara State (Halar)
- Rajpipla
- Ambliara State Sabarkantha Agency
- Sachin
- Sanjeli
- Sant
- Surgana
- Tharad
- Vanod
- Mansa State
- Vijaynagar
- Wadhwan
- Wankaner
- Kotda Nayani

=== Kathiawar Agency ===
Princely states of Kathiawar in Saurashtra
Name of state	British Resident or Agent	Now part of	Last or present ruler
Dhrol State	Princely State	Later Kathiawar, India; Now Gujarat, India	Chandrasinhji Dipsinhji
Nawanagar State	Princely State	Later Kathiawar, India; Now Gujarat, India	Digvijaysinhji Ranjitsinhji Jadeja
Makaji Meghpar	Jagir	Later Kathiawar, India; Now Gujarat, India	Hardhrol Bhayats
Rajkot State	Princely state	Later Kathiawar, India; Now Gujarat, India	Pradyumansinhji Lakhajirajsinhji
Gondal State	Princely state	Later Kathiawar, India; Now Gujarat, India	Bhojrajji Bhagwatsimhji
Morvi State	Princely state	Later Kathiawar, India; Now Gujarat, India	Lakhdirji Waghji
Porbandar State	Princely state	Later Kathiawar, India; Now Gujarat, India	Natwarsinhji Bhavsinhji
Bhavnagar State	Princely state	Later Kathiawar, India; Now Gujarat, India	Krishna Kumarsinhji Bhavsinhji
Wadhwan State	Princely state	Later Kathiawar, India; Now Gujarat, India	Shri Suredrasinhji Jhala
Junagadh State	Princely state	Later Kathiawar, India; Now Gujarat, India	Muhammad Mahabat Khan III
Jafarabad State	Princely state	Later Kathiawar, India; Now Gujarat, India	Mohammad Khan II

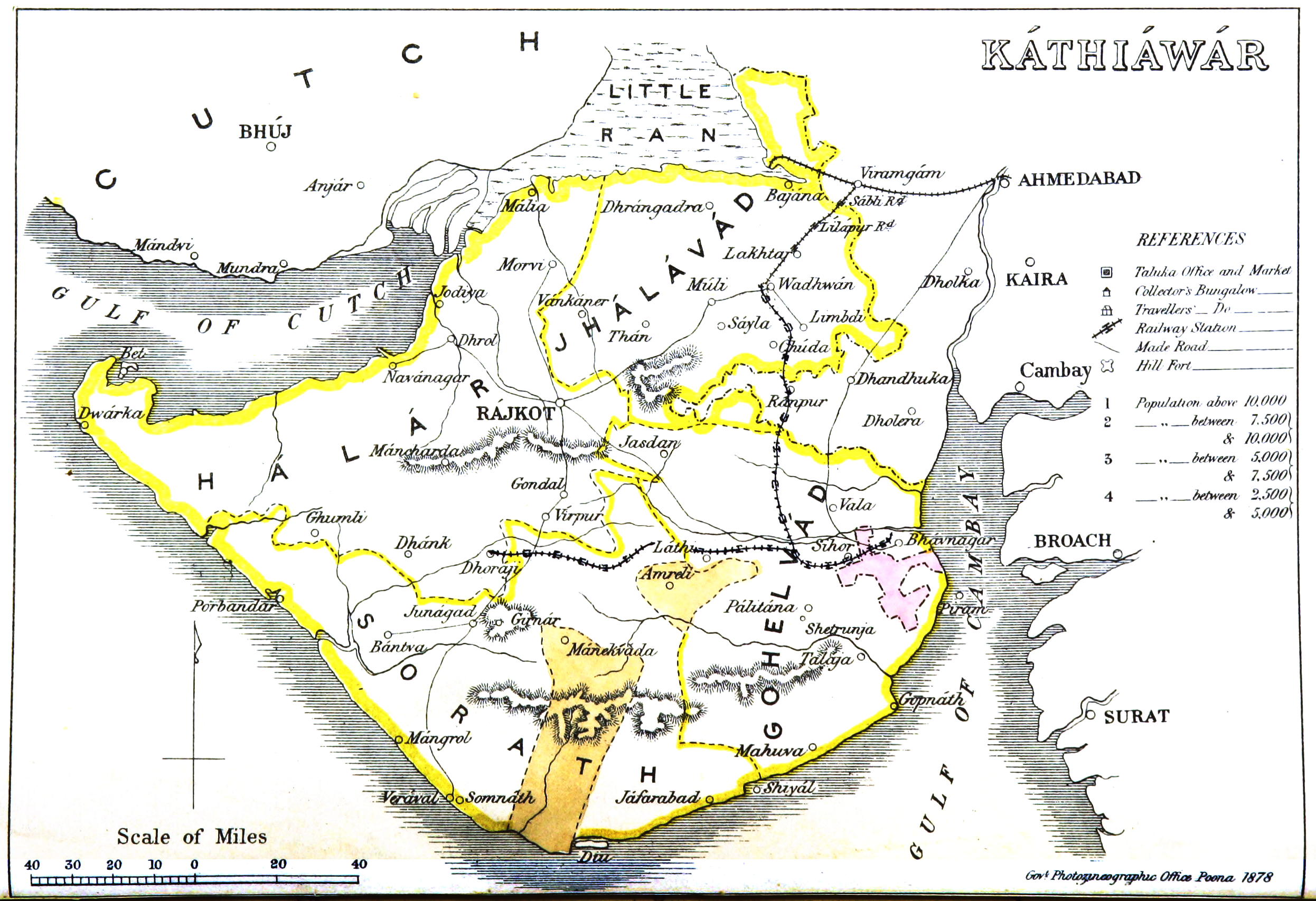
Kathiawar 1855 with its four prant districts: Halar, Jhalavad, Sorath and Gohelwad.

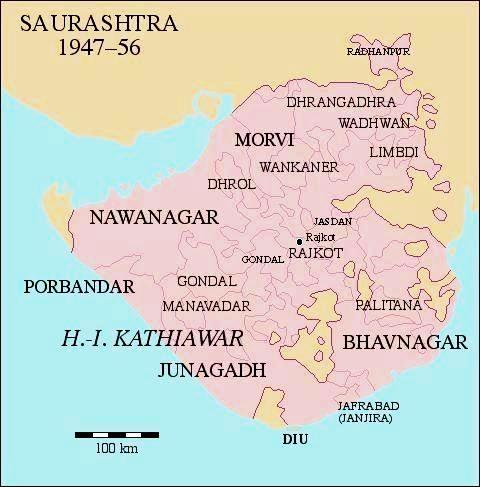
United Saurashtra (Kathiawar) State 1947-56

=== States of Central India Agency ===
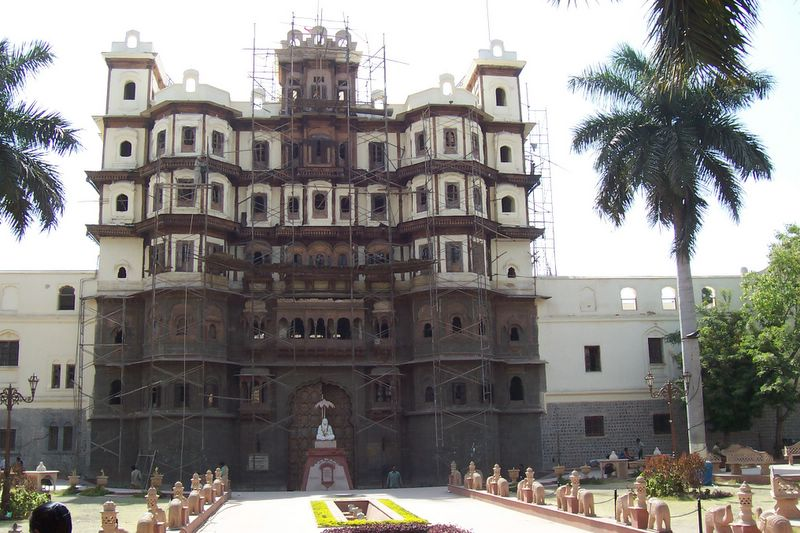
The Rajwada of Indore, built by The Holkars of the Maratha Kingdom

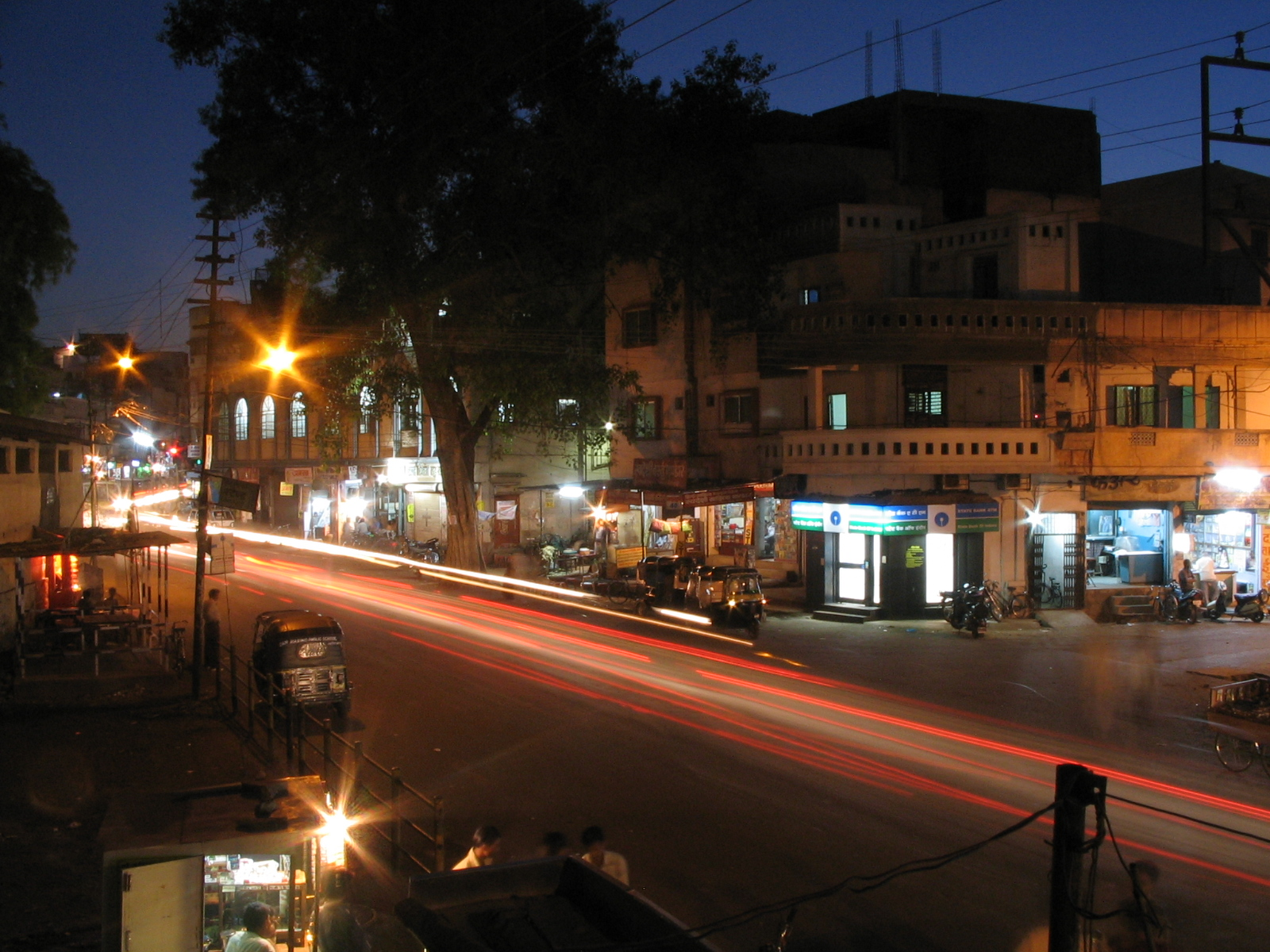
Subhash Marg, Indore

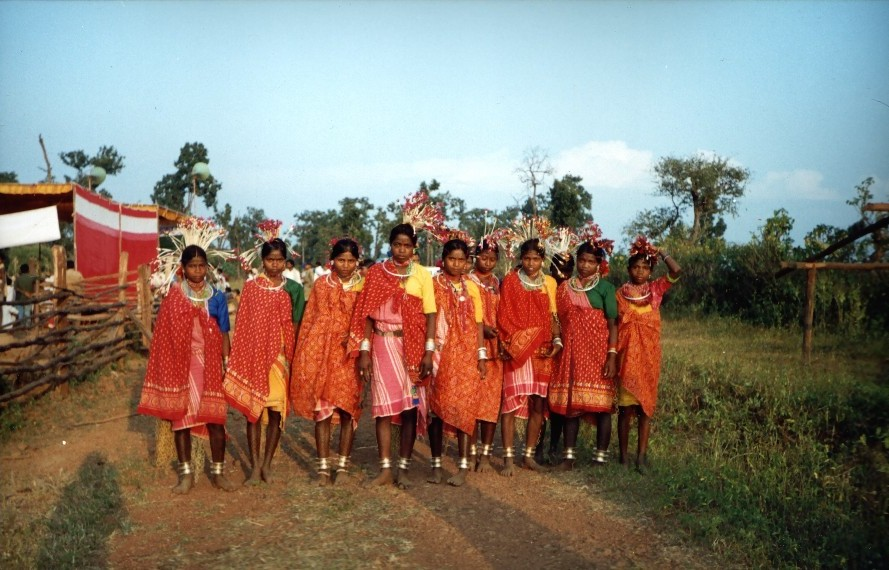
Bhil tribe girls in Jhabua

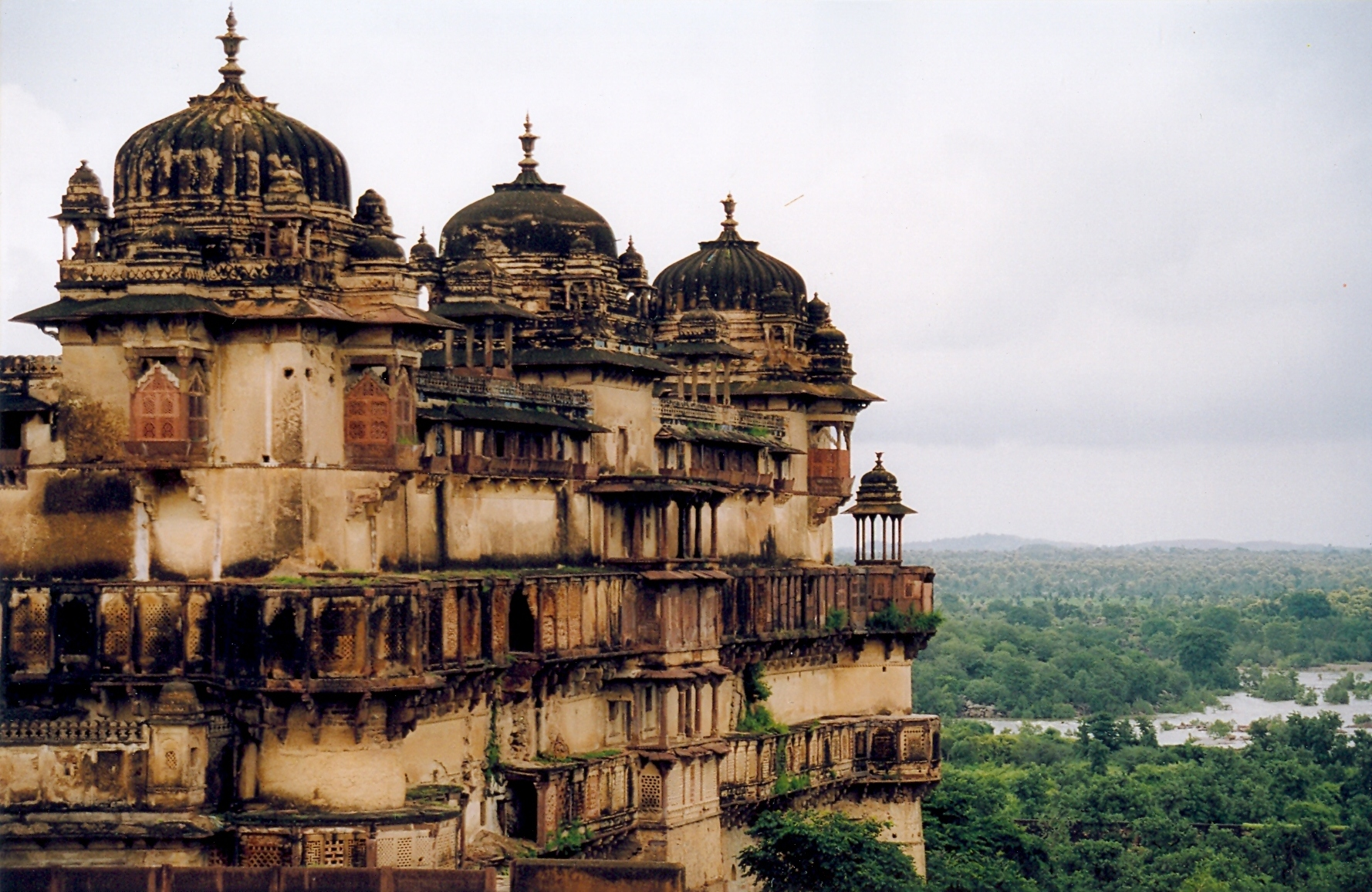
Orchha Palace, Madhya Pradesh

- Ajaigarh
- Alipura
- Alirajpur
- Baraundha
- Barwani
- Basoda
- Bhaisunda
- Bhopal
- Bijawar
- Charkhari
- Chhatarpur
- Chirgaon
- Datia
- Dewas Junior
- Dewas Senior
- Dhar
- Dhurwai
- Gaurihar
- Gwalior
- Indore
- Jamnia
- Jaora
- Jaso
- Jobat
- Kamta-Rajaula
- Khaniadhana
- Khilchipur
- Kothi
- Kurwai
- Maihar
- Makrai
- Muhammadgarh
- Nagod
- Narsighgarh
- Orchha
- Pahra
- Paldeo
- Panna
- Pathari
- Piploda
- Rajgarh
- Ratlam
- Rewa
- Sailana
- Sitamau
- Sohawal
- Taraon
- Tori Fatehpur

=== Eastern States Agency ===
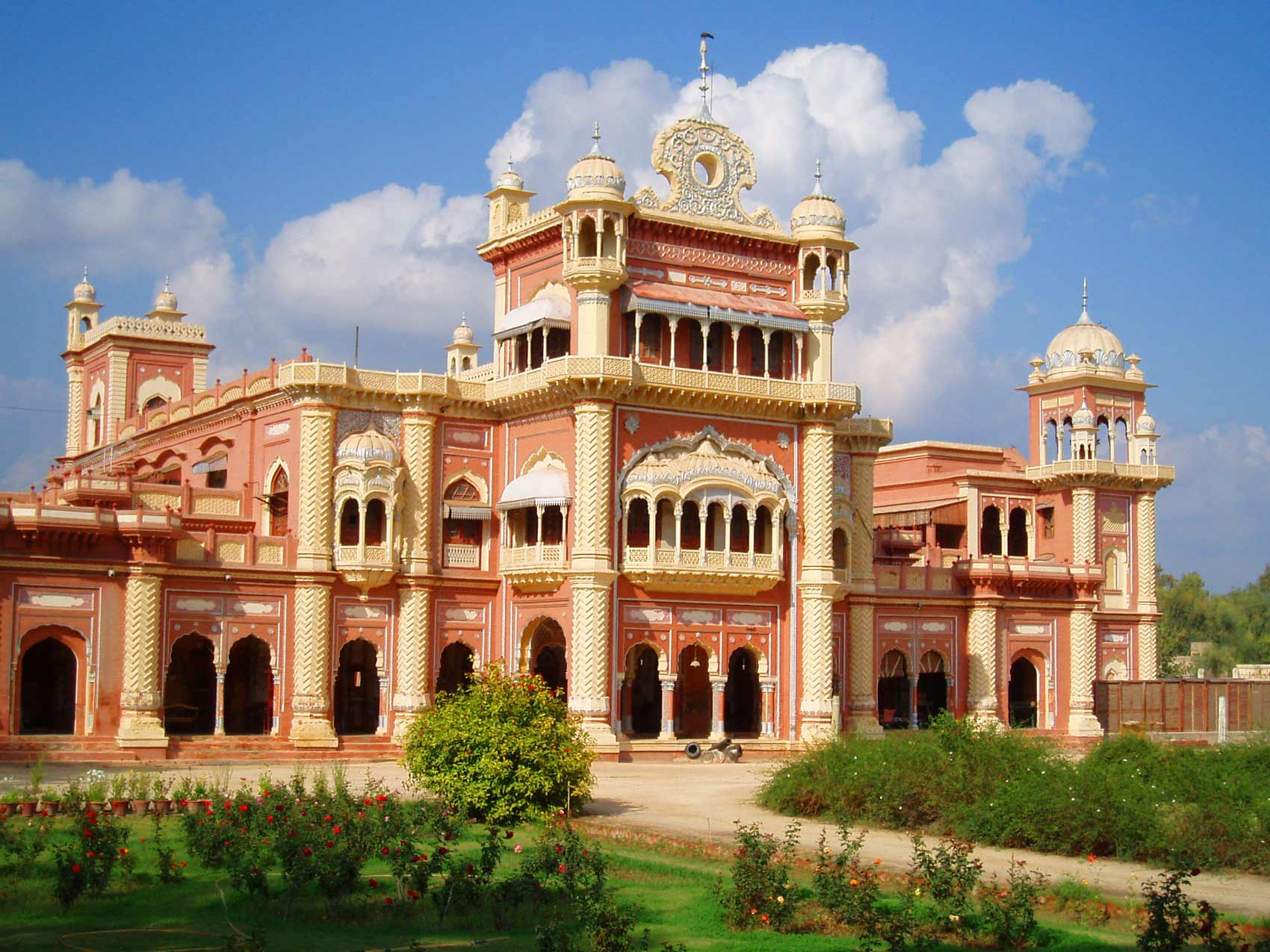
Faiz Mahal, Khairpur

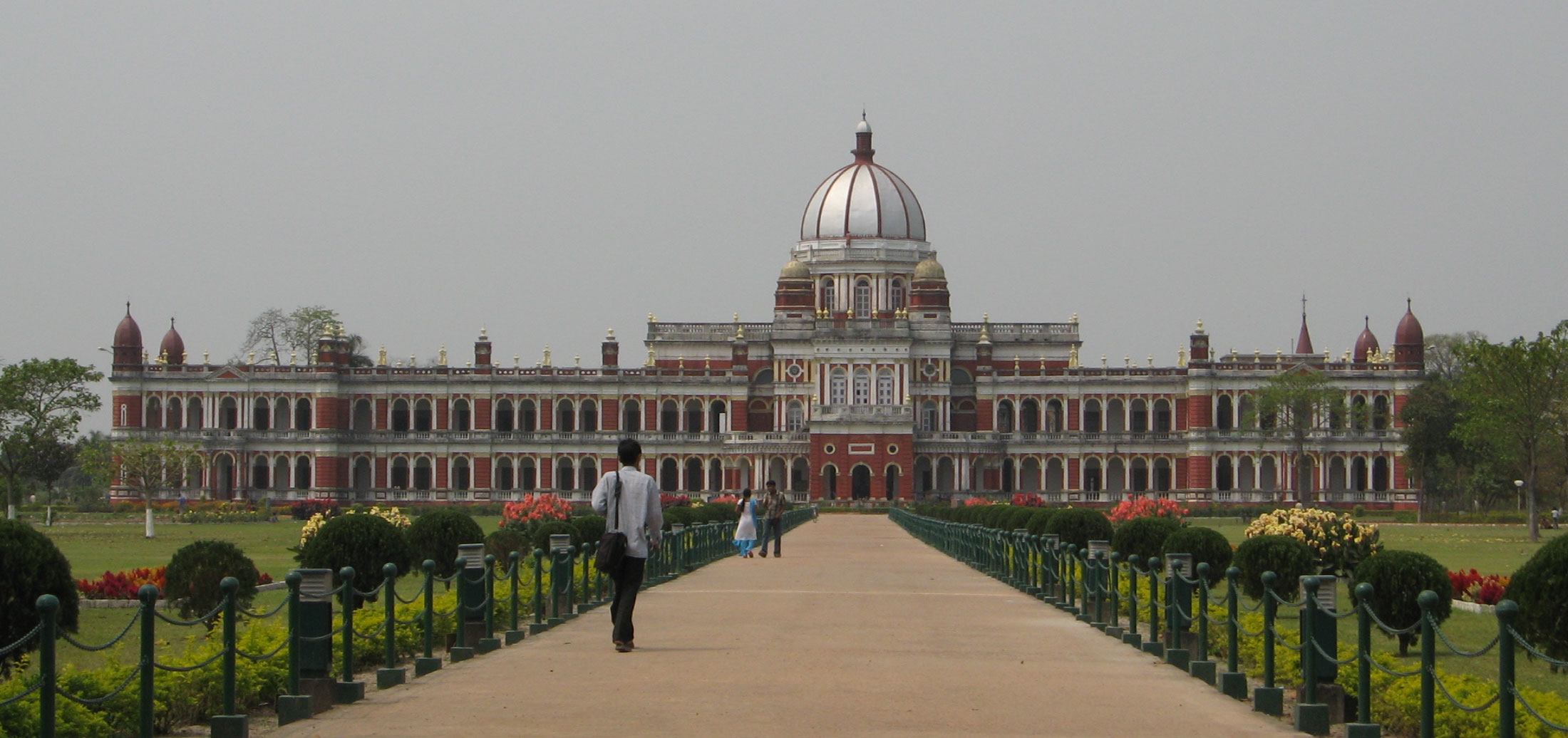
Palace in Cooch Behar

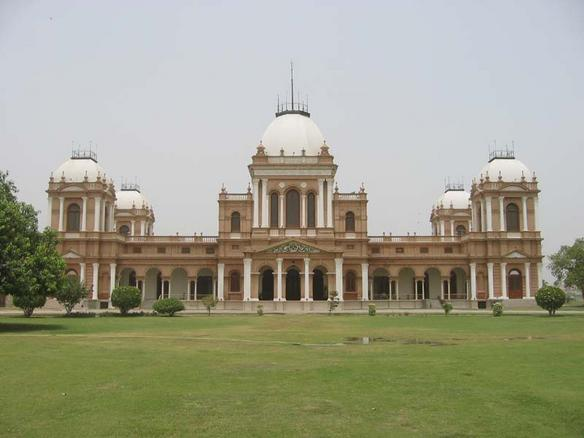
Bahawalpur Nur Mahal

Girivilas Palace in Sarangarh

==== Orissa States Agency ====
- Athgarh
- Athmallik
- Bamra
- Baramba
- Baudh
- Bonai
- Daspalla
- Dhenkanal
- Gangpur
- Hindol
- Kalahandi (Karond)
- Keonjhar
- Khandpara
- Kharsawan
- Mayurbhanj
- Narsinghpur
- Nayagarh
- Nilgiri
- Pal Lahara
- Patna (Balangir)
- Rairakhol
- Ranpur
- Seraikela
- Sonepur
- Talcher
- Tigiria

==== Chhattisgarh States Agency ====
- Bastar
- Changbhakar
- Chhuikandan
- Jashpur
- Kanker
- Kawardha
- Khairagarh
- Koriya (Korea)
- Nandgaon
- Raigarh
- Sakti
- Sarangarh
- Surguja
- Udaipur (Dharamjaigarh)

==== Bengal States Agency ====
- Cooch Behar
- Tripura

=== Mahi Kantha Agency ===
- Idar
- Danta
- Vijaynagar (Pol)
- Malpur
- Mansa
- Mohanpur
- Ilol
- Katosan
- Ambaliara
- Pethapur
- Punadra
- Ranasa
- Dabha
- Dadhalia
- Rupal
- Varsoda
- Vasna
- Dedhrota

== Former Princely States annexed during the British Raj ==
- Ballabhgarh (1858)
- Banpur, seized in 1857
- Bhaddaiyan Raj (1858)
- Bijeraghogarh
- Chirgaon (one of the seized Hasht Bhaiya jagirs)
- Khaddi
- Kulpahar (1858)
- Makrai (1890–1893)
- Purwa (one of the seized Chaube Jagirs)
- Shahgarh, seized in 1857
- Tiroha
- Tulsipur (1859)
- Udaipur, Chhattisgarh (1854–1860)
- Vallabhipura (1860)
- Manipur (1891), the last princely state annexed, for a brief period but later restored in the same year.

== Former kingdoms annexed during the British East India Company era ==
- Rohilkhand (1774)
- Carnatic (1801)
- Sivagangai (1803)
- Guler (1813)
- Jaitpur (1849)
- Jalaun (1840)
- Jaswan (1849)
- Jhansi (1854)
- Kangra (1846)
- Kumaon (1816)
- Kutlehar (1825)
- Punjab (1849)
- Nagpur (1854)
- Nurpur (1849)
- Oudh (1856)
- Satara (1849)
- Sambalpur (1849)
- Siba (1849)
- Sind (1843)
- Tanjore (1855)

== See also ==
- List of princely states of British India (alphabetical)
- List of Maratha dynasties and states
- List of Rajput dynasties and states

== Notes ==
Sources

- Indian Princely States Genealogy
- Flags of Indian Princely States
