= Baghelkhand =

- Region
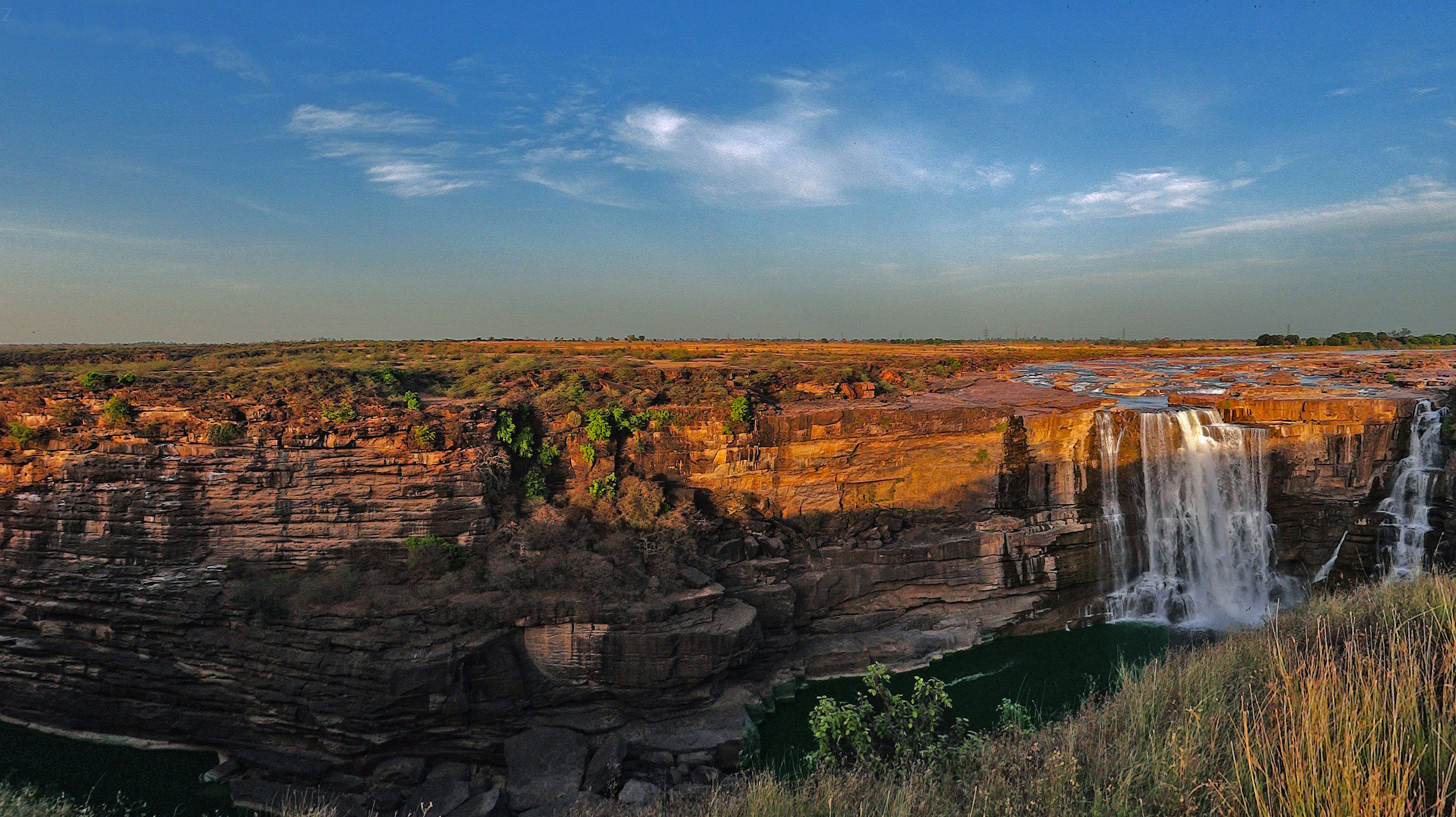
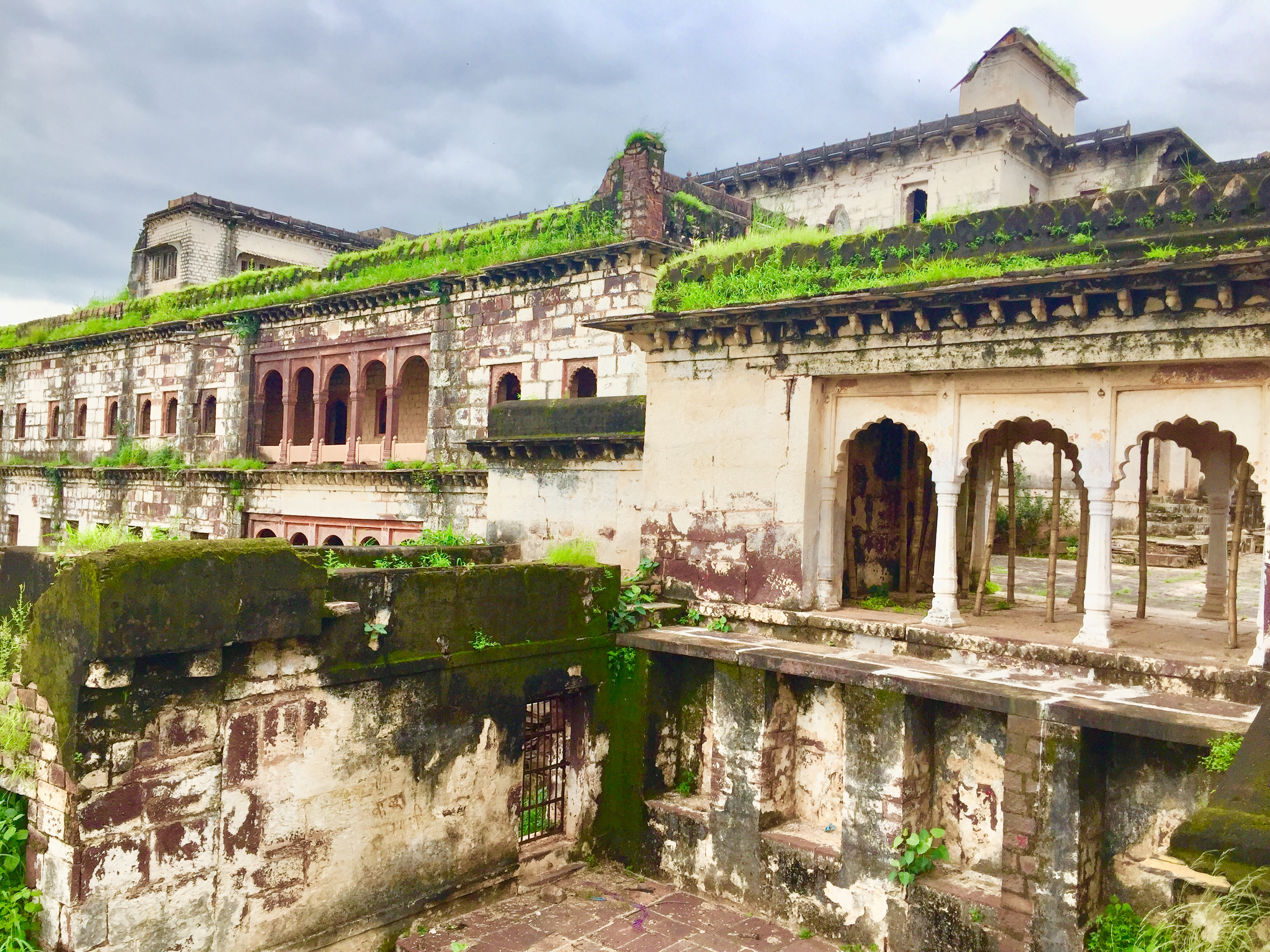
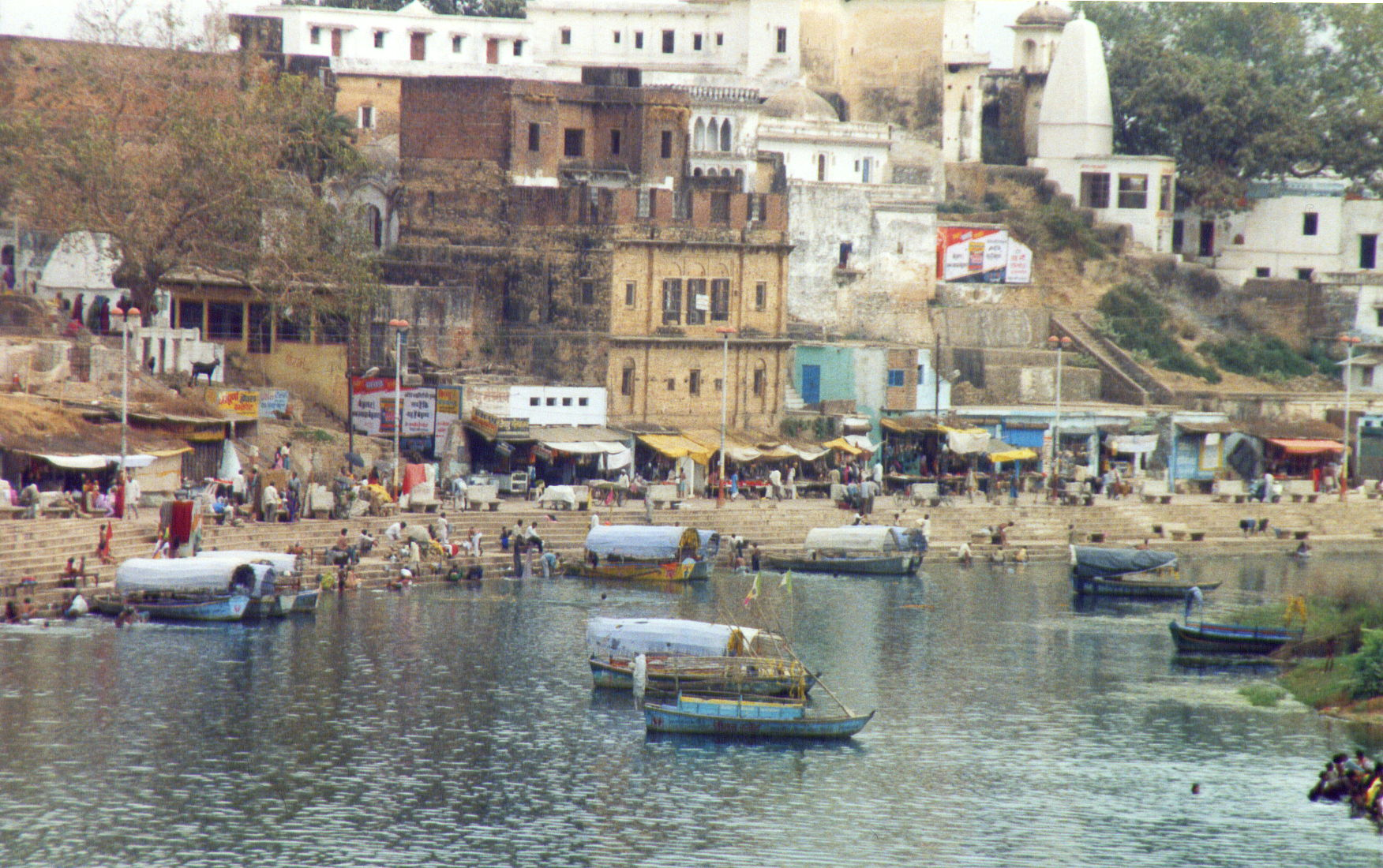
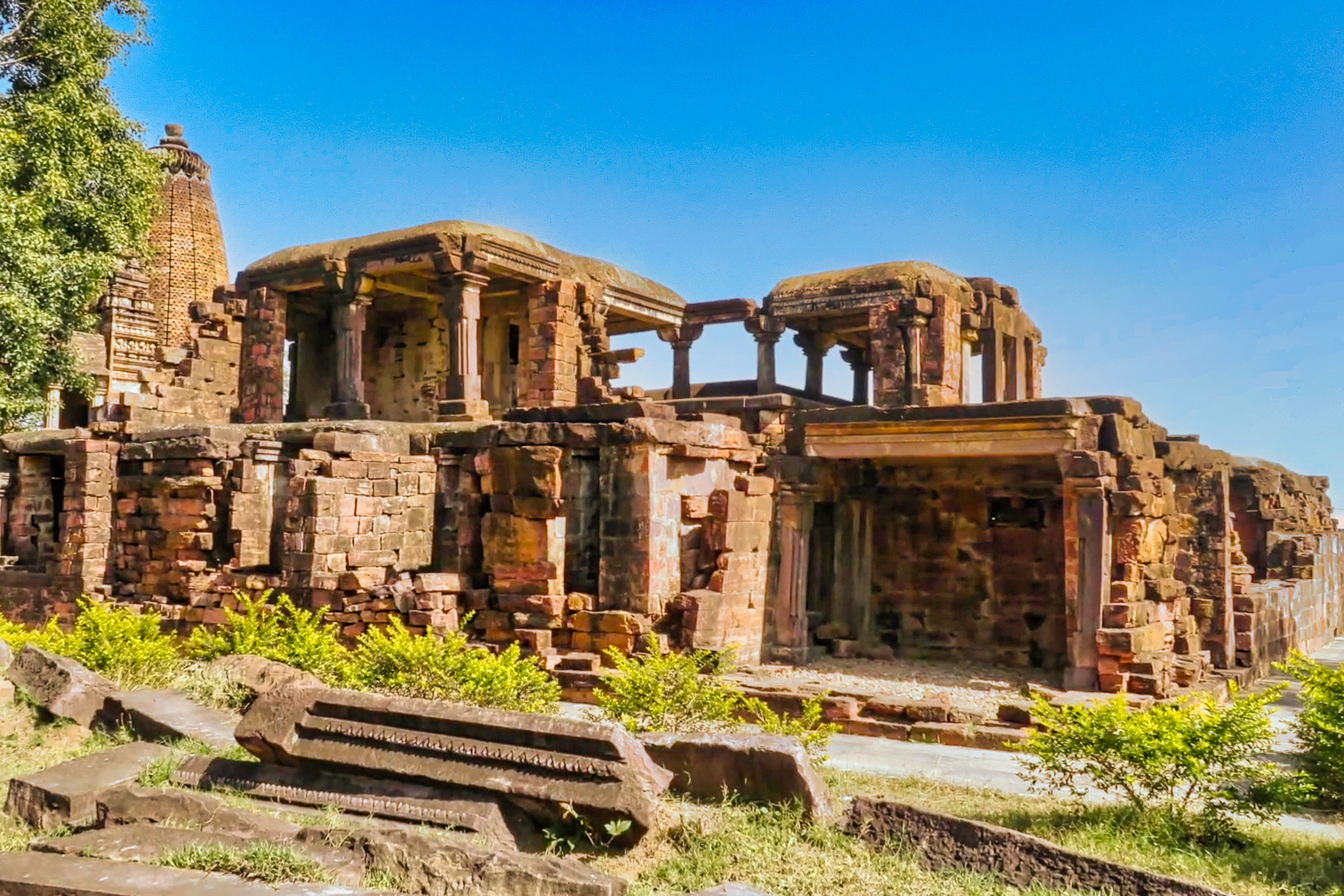
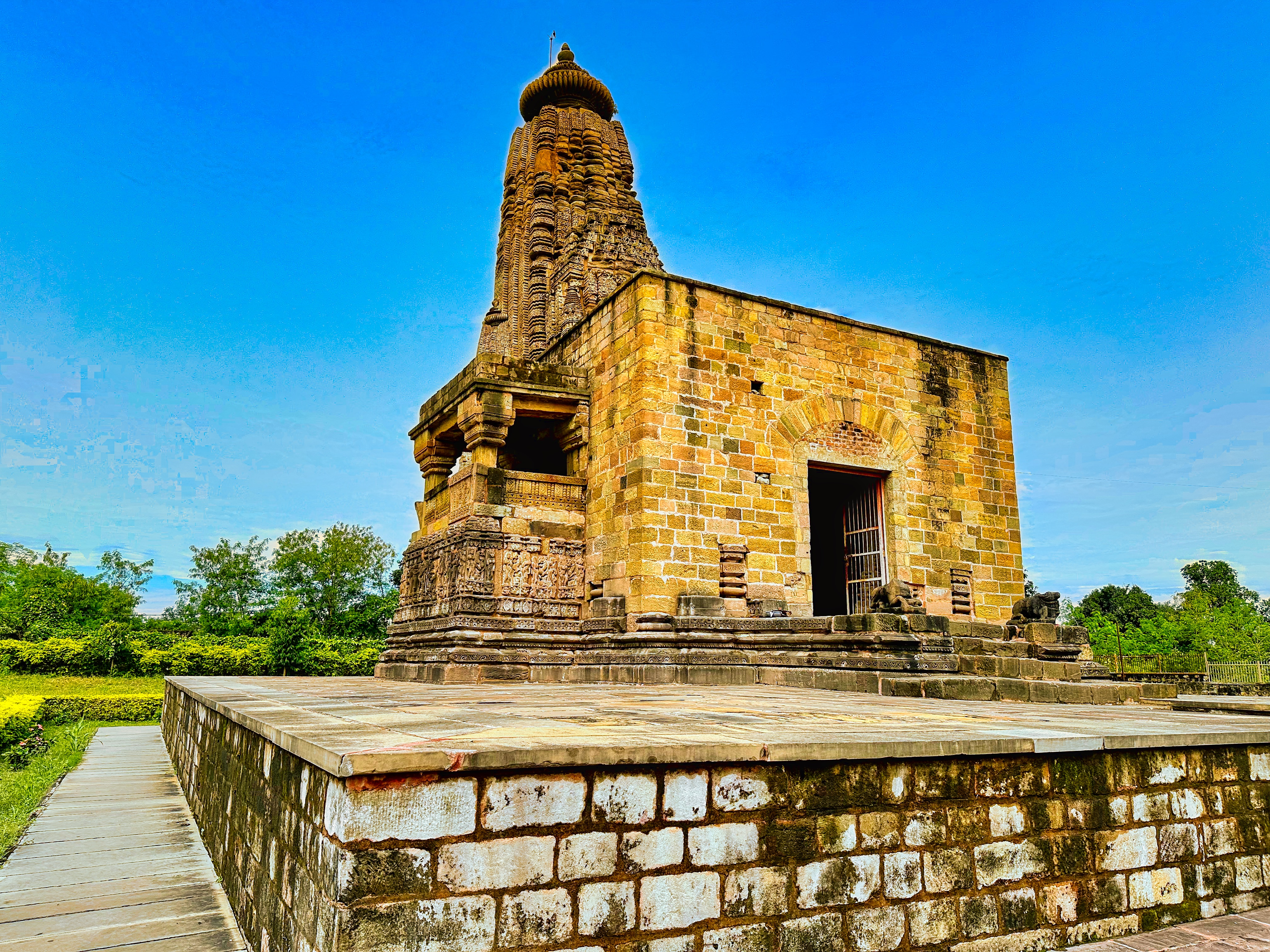
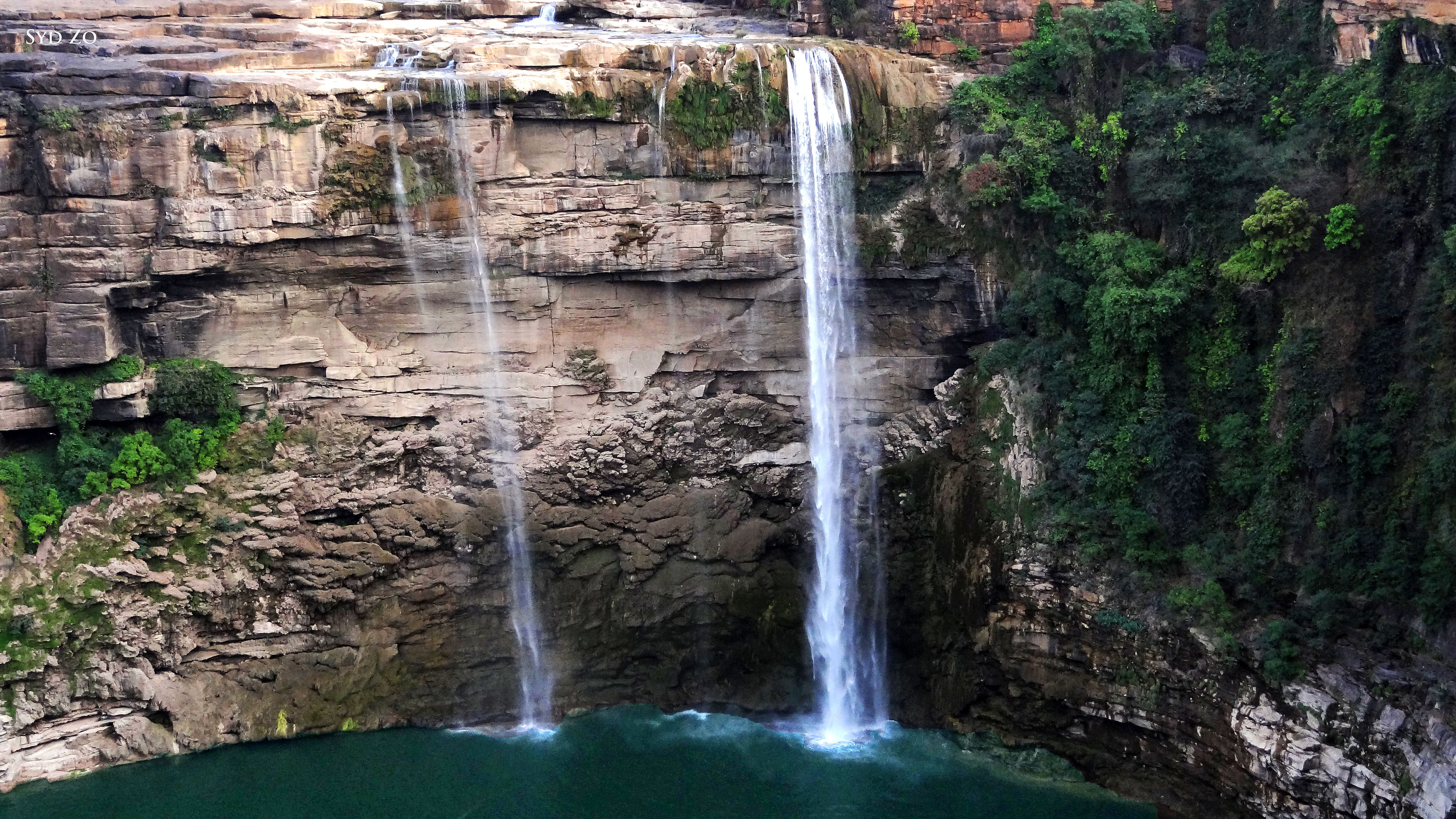
- Top to Bottom; Left to Right: Purwa Falls, Govindgarh Palace, Ramghat at Chitrakoot, Chandreh Temple at Rampur Naikin, Virateshwara Temple at Sohagpur and Keoti Falls

- Location of Baghelkhand in India

- Location of Baghelkhand Baghelkhand (India)
- Country: India
- State: Madhya Pradesh and Uttar Pradesh
- Covering territory: Singrauli, Rewa, Satna, Shahdol, Sidhi, Anuppur, Umaria, Maihar, Mauganj, of Madhya Pradesh; Sonbhadra and Chitrakoot of Uttar Pradesh
- Languages: Bagheli language

Area
  - Total: 42,179 km^{2} (16,285 sq mi)

Population (2011)
  - Total: 10,351,135
  - Density: 245.41/km^{2} (635.61/sq mi)

Bagelkhand or Baghelkhand (IPA: [bəɡʰeːlkʰəɳɖ]) is a proposed state and a mountain range in central India that covers the northeastern regions of Madhya Pradesh and a small area of southeastern Uttar Pradesh.

== History ==
=== Dahala ===
Baghelkhand was known as Dahala in the 6th–12th century. Rewa State was founded in the area circa 1140. The area's current name refers to the Vaghela dynasty who ruled this state.

=== Bagelkhand Agency ===
The Bagelkhand Agency was a British political unit which managed the relations of the British with a number of autonomous princely states existing outside British India, namely Rewa and 11 minor states, of which the most prominent were Maihar, Nagod and Sohawal. Other principalities included Jaso, Kothi, Baraundha (aka Patharkachhar) as well as the Kalinjar Chaubes, consisting of the princely estates of Paldeo, Kamta-Rajaula, Tarauwhan, Pahra and Bhaisaunda.

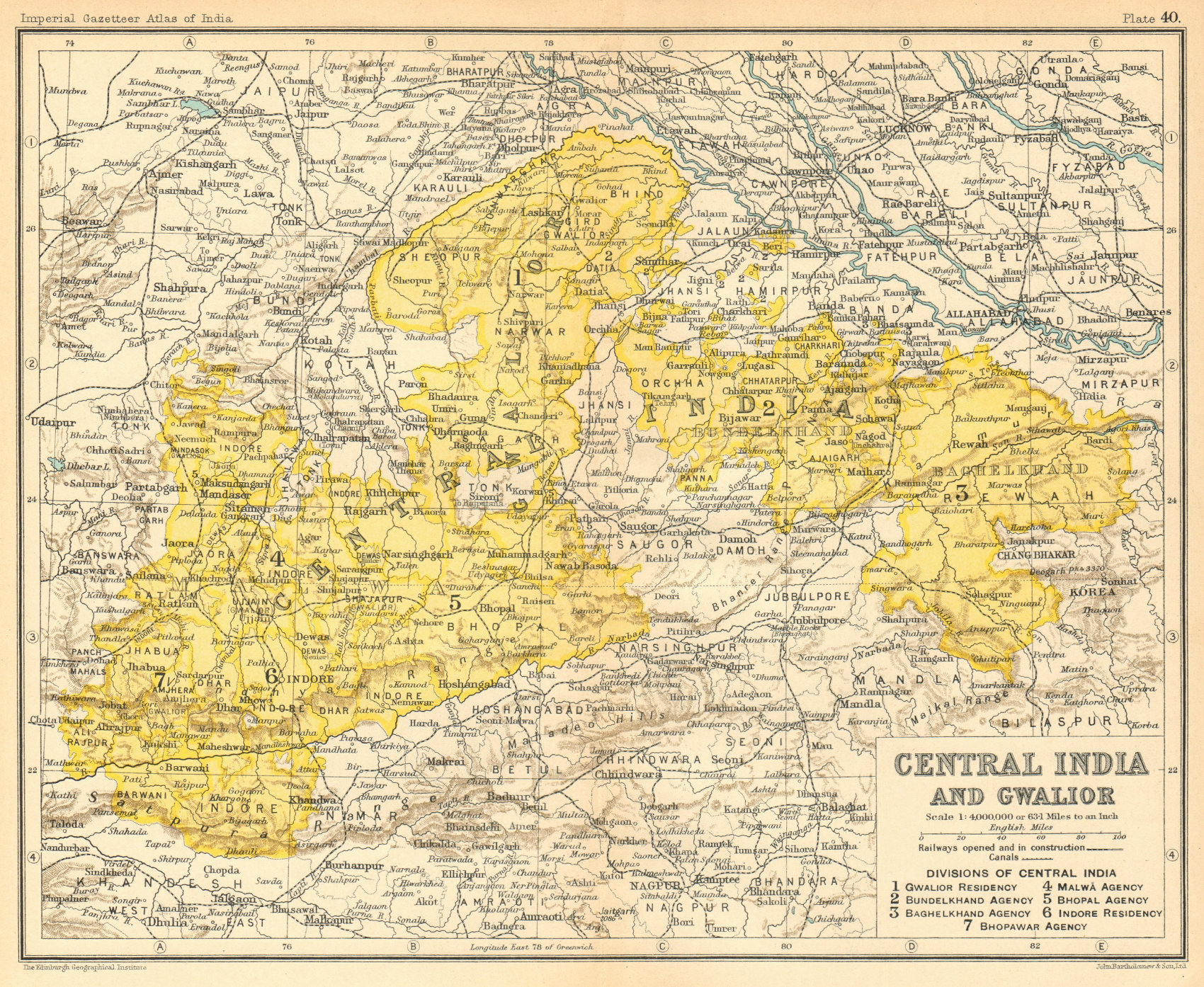
Central India Agency Map

== Geography ==
Bagelkhand is surrounded by the Indo-Gangetic plains in the north and east, Bundelkhand in the west and the Vindhya Range in the south.

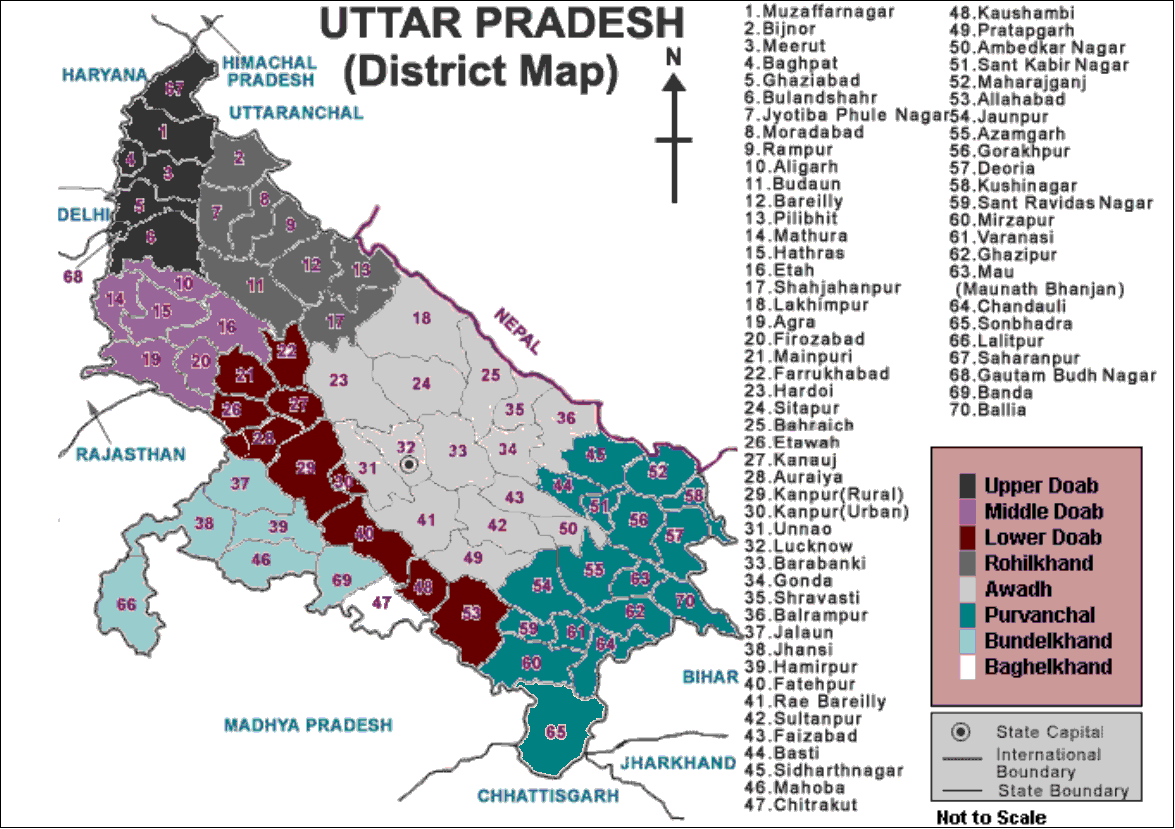
Regions of Uttar Pradesh

== Administration ==
Currently it divided between Madhya Pradesh and Uttar Pradesh. It includes the districts Rewa, Satna, Shahdol, Sidhi, Maihar, Katni in Madhya Pradesh and Chitrakoot & Southern Part of Sonbhadra and Mirzapur in Uttar Pradesh.

== Demographics ==
The inhabitants of Bagelkhand are called Bagheli and they speak the Bagheli language which is also designated as a dialect of Hindi.

Religion in Baghelkhand (2011)
| Religion | Percent |
| Hinduism | 95.48% |
| Islam | 3.42% |
| Others | 1.10% |

Languages in Baghelkhand (2011)
| Language | Percent |
| Hindi | 65.59% |
| Bagheli | 25.33% |
| Bundeli | 3.20% |
| Urdu | 0.17% |
| Others | 5.71% |
