= Bagelkhand Agency =

Political unit in British India (1871–1933)

- Agency of British India
- 1871–1933
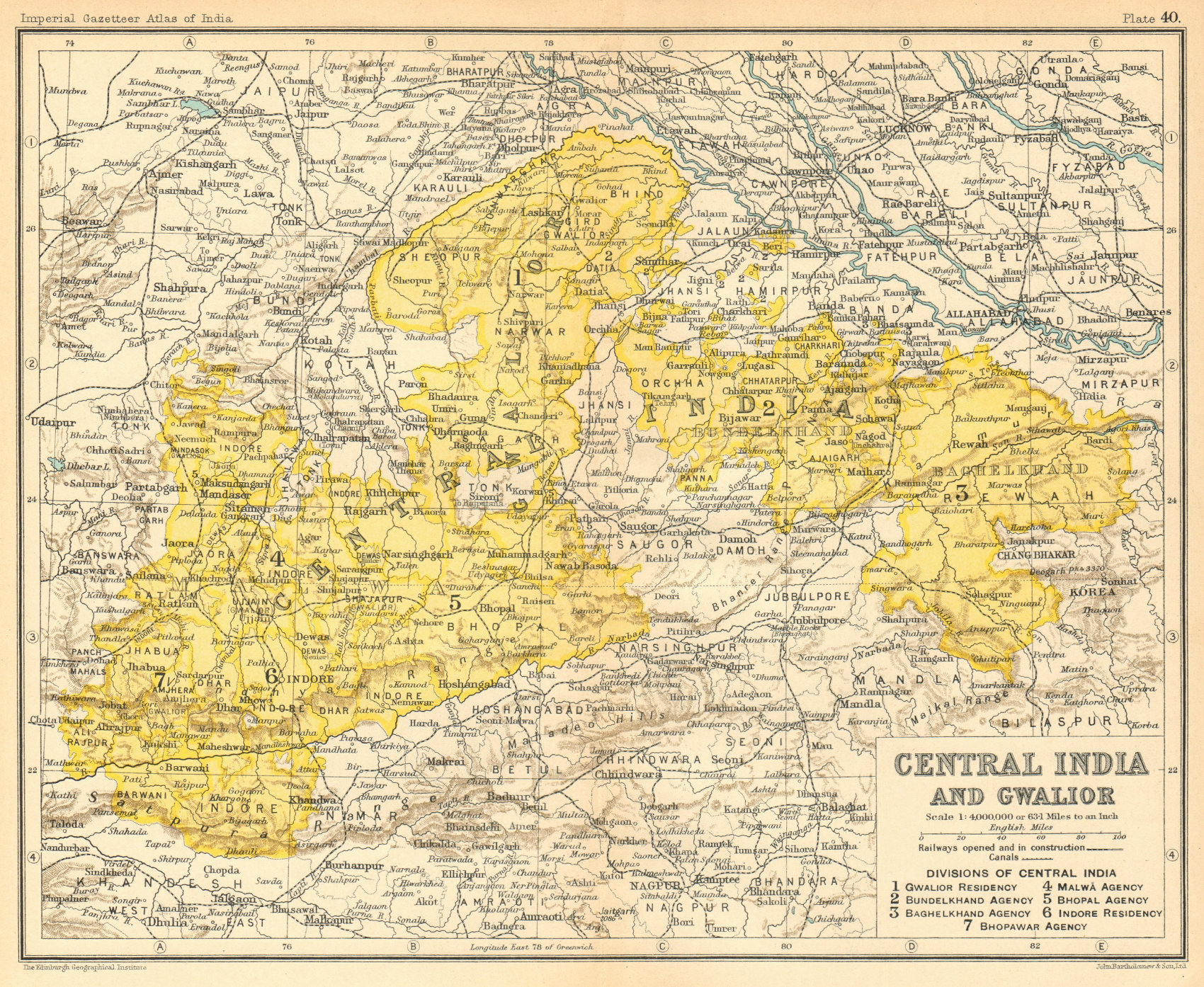
- Map of the princely states of the Baghelkhand Agency
- Area
  - 1901: 37,100 km^{2} (14,300 sq mi)
- Population
  - 1901: 1,555,024
- History
  - Established: 1871
  - Disestablished: 1933
Succeeded by
Bundelkhand Agency

The Bagelkhand Agency was a British political unit which managed the relations of the British with a number of autonomous princely states existing outside British India, namely Rewa and 11 minor states, of which the most prominent were Maihar, Nagod and Sohawal. Other principalities included Jaso, Kothi, Baraundha (a.k.a. Patharkachhar) as well as the Kalinjar Chaubes, consisting of the princely estates of Paldeo, Kamta-Rajaula, Taraon, Pahra and Bhaisaunda.

== History ==
The Agency was established in March 1871 and was named after the Bagelkhand region. From 1871 to 1933 the Agency was under the political supervision of the Governor-General of India's Agent for Central India, and under the direct supervision of a political Agent residing ordinarily at Singrauli.

The total area was 14,323 square miles (37,100 km^{2}), and the population in 1901 was 1,555,024, a decrease of 11% over the previous census ten years before, largely due to the results of famine. The rainfall was very deficient in 1895–1897, causing a famine in 1897; and in 1899–1900 there was another drought in some states. In 1931, the eleven smaller states were transferred to the Bundelkhand Agency, and in 1933 the agency was dissolved, when Rewa State joined the Indore Residency.

After the partition of British India into two independent states—India and Pakistan—in 1947, the princely states that made up the Baghelkhand Agency all chose to accede to India and were merged with Rewa to form the new Vindhya Pradesh, which was in turn merged into Madhya Pradesh on November 1, 1956.

== See also ==
- Bagelkhand
