= Kothi, Madhya Pradesh =

Kothi
- Town
- Location in Madhya Pradesh, India Kothi (India)
- Coordinates: 24.75°N 80.77°E
- Country: India
- State: Madhya Pradesh
- District: Satna
- Elevation: 563 m (1,847 ft)

Population (2001)
  - Total: 7,710

Languages
  - Official: Hindi
- Time zone: UTC+5:30 (IST)
- ISO 3166 code: IN-MP
- Vehicle registration: MP

Kothi is a town and a nagar panchayat in Satna district in the Indian state of Madhya Pradesh. Historically, Kothi was the capital of the erstwhile Kothi State, founded by Baghel Rajput ruler Raja Bahadur Jagat Rai Singh Baghel in 1650.

== History ==
Maharaja Vyaghradev Solanki, a scion of Anhilwara Patan in Gujrat, fl. 1234 A.D. (631 H.E.), he was a Baghel Rajput King who laid foundation of Baghelkhand (House of Baghel); married Maharani Singhumati, daughter of Raja Makund Dev Chandravat, and had issue, five sons.

-Maharaja Karan Dev, succeeded to Rewa (princely state).

-Kirti Dev

-Surya Dev

-Shyam Dev

-Rao Kandhar Dev, ancestor of the Bara Rajas or the Raos of Kasauta (Shankargarh).

Rao Kandhar Dev who was the 5th son of Maharaja Vyaghradev of Rewa (princely state), born 663 Samvat, in 683 Samvat his elder brother conferred on him the title of Rao (later on the title of 'Maharao') with Illaka Pardhwan, which yielded an income of Rs. 12 Lac per annum, from that time the family is known as the Kasauta Rao family who ruled the area of Shankargarh, which comes under Prayagraj district of Uttar Pradesh.

In the mid of 17th century one of their descendant Jagat Rai Singh Baghel, who was the youngest son of Maharao Raja Bahadur Makrand Rai Singh Baghel of Kasauta (Shankargarh), and the younger brother of Bhagwant Rai Singh Baghel, migrated towards present day Satna and established the Kothi Princely State, presently which comes under Satna district of Madhya Pradesh.

Lal Jagat Rai Singh Baghel was a courageous warrior and highly skilled in the military arts of his time. His prominent companions included Tej Singh, Nadul Singh, Ran Singh, and Randalan Singh, Randulah Singh, Govindrai Singh, all of whom were also valiant fighters. Around 1650 CE, when Pahad Singh Bundela, a rajput ruler of the Orchha kingdom attacked Rewa during the reign of Maharaja Anup Singh, Jagat Rai and his companions fought against the Bundelas and demonstrated their exceptional military skills. Maharaja Anup Singh's younger brother, Fateh Singh (founder of Sohawal State), was greatly impressed by Jagat Rai's bravery and strategic abilities.

The Rao Sahibs of Churhat (the royal family of Churhat, Sidhi, Madhya Pradesh) were also descendants of the Kasauta Rao family of Shankargarh (Prayagraj, Uttar Pradesh).

Thakur Ranmat Singh Baghel (from Mankhari village, Satna) and his uncle, Thakur Shyam Shah Baghel, were both prominent leaders of the 1857 revolt in Baghelkhand, and they were also descendants of the Kothi royal family of Kothi State.The British force, under the command of Brigadier general Carpenter, engaged the rebel forces of Ranmat Singh in a bloody battle at Chitrakoot in August 1858. Thakur Ranmat Singh gave a very tough fight during the battle but suffered severe injuries during the encounter with Carpenter's forces. He managed to evade capture by fleeing toward Kothi, where Raja Bahadur Avdhoot Singh Baghel of Kothi State provided him with secret shelter, medical assistance, food, and ammunition.

During the Revolt of 1857 in Baghelkhand, the Kothi State (Kothi princely state, Satna) is noted for helping Thakur Ranmat Singh Baghel. Historical accounts mention that Raja Bahadur Avdhoot Singh Baghel of Kothi State provided rebels with shelter, ammunition, food, money, and support for recruiting fighters.

Kothi State was founded in the mid of 17th century by a Baghel Rajput ruler who expelled the former Bharr ruler of the area.

Towards the beginning of the nineteenth century, and in much the same manner as neighbouring Sohawal, Kothi became a British protectorate initially subordinate to Panna State. However, a separate sanad was granted to Rais Lal Duniyapati Singh in 1810.

Following India's independence in 1947, the last ruling chief of Kothi, Raja Bahadur Govind Pratap Singh, signed the Instrument of Accession to merge the state into the Union of India.

In 1948, the state was formally integrated into the newly created province of Vindhya Pradesh. Under the States Reorganisation Act of 1956, Vindhya Pradesh was merged into Madhya Pradesh. Today, the historic Kothi Fort stands as a monument to the legacy of the Baghel rulers in the region.

Rulers:

Rulers adopted the title Raja Bahadur.

Title Rais

1650 – .... Lal Jagat Rai Singh Baghel. He clashed with the army of Pahad Singh Bundela, who attached Rewa.

..... – Lal Angadh Rai Singh Baghel.

..... – 1721 Lal Barjor Singh Baghel (Virjor).

1721 – .... Lal Jagatrop Singh Baghel. In 1771, Kothi State army defeated the army of the Sohawal State in the Battle of Dehunt (Dehuta). During the battle, Sohawal State ruler Raja Prithvipati Singh (Prithipal) was killed.

..... – 1790 Lal Jai Singh Baghel.

1790 – 1829 Lal Duniyapati Singh Baghel.

1829 – 1852 Lal Madhav Singh Baghel.

1852 – 1862 Lal Abdhut Singh Baghel. During the Revolt of 1857, Abdhut Singh rendered logistical and financial support to Thakur Ranmat Singh Baghel in his resistance against the British. Lal Abdhut Singh Baghel had seven sons named: Lal Ran Bahadur Singh (later became Raja Bahadur of Kothi State), Lal Ranjor Singh - Pavaidar(Feudal landlord) of Patari, Lal Randaman Singh - Jagirdar(Elakadar) of Amiliya, Lal Ram Narayan Singh - Pavaidar of Nachnoura, Lal Devraj Singh - Pavaidar of Ujraundha, Lal Ramraj Singh, and Lal Ranfatah Singh.

1862 – 5 June 1887 Lal Ran Bahadur Singh Baghel. He was granted the title of Raja Bahadur as a hereditary distinction on 1st January 1878 by the British government.

Title Raja Bahadur

1887 – 1895 Bhagwat Bahadur Singh Ju Deo.

1895 – 8 August 1914 Avadhendra Bahadur Singh Ju Deo. In 1912, the British Government honoured Raja Bahadur Avadhendra Bahadur Singh with the title of C.I.E. (Companion of the Order of the Indian Empire). Avadhendra Bahadur Singh Ju Deo had two sons named : Sitaram Pratap Bahadur Singh Ju Deo (Sitaraman), who later became Raja Bahadur of Kothi State and Umaraman Pratap Singh Ju Deo, who was adopted as the successor, became Raja Bahadur (ruler) of Jamo State, Pratapgarh, Uttar Pradesh.

1914 – 1934 Sitaram Pratap Bahadur Singh Ju Deo (Sitaraman).

1934 – 1948 Kaushalendra Pratap Singh Ju Deo, former Member of the Legislative Assembly (MLA) representing the Kothi constituency in Vindhya Pradesh from 1952 to 1956.

1948 - 2017 Govind Pratap Singh Ju Deo.

2017 - 2022 Ghanshyam Singh Ju Deo.

2022 - Harshvardhan Singh Ju Deo.

== Notable people ==
- Kaushalendra Pratap Singh Ju Deo, former Member of the Legislative Assembly (MLA) representing the Kothi constituency in Vindhya Pradesh from 1952 to 1956, and the erstwhile ruler of Kothi State, Satna.
- Thakur Ranmat Singh Baghel, legendary freedom fighter and 1857 revolt leader of Baghelkhand.
- Thakur Shyam Shah Baghel, legendary freedom fighter and 1857 revolt leader of Baghelkhand and uncle of freedom fighter Thakur Ranmat Singh Baghel.

== Demographics ==
As of 2001 India census, Kothi had a population of 7,710. Males constitute 51% of the population and females 49%. Kothi has an average literacy rate of 62%, higher than the national average of 59.5%: male literacy is 72%, and female literacy is 52%. In Kothi, 17% of the population is under 6 years of age. Kothi is 20 KM from Satna.

State Highway No. 11 is under construction which passes near the town.
