= Chaube Jagirs =

Group of five states in central British India (1812–1948)

Coordinates: 25°05′N 80°50′E

- Jagirs
- 1812–1948
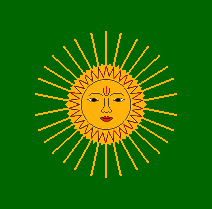
- Flag

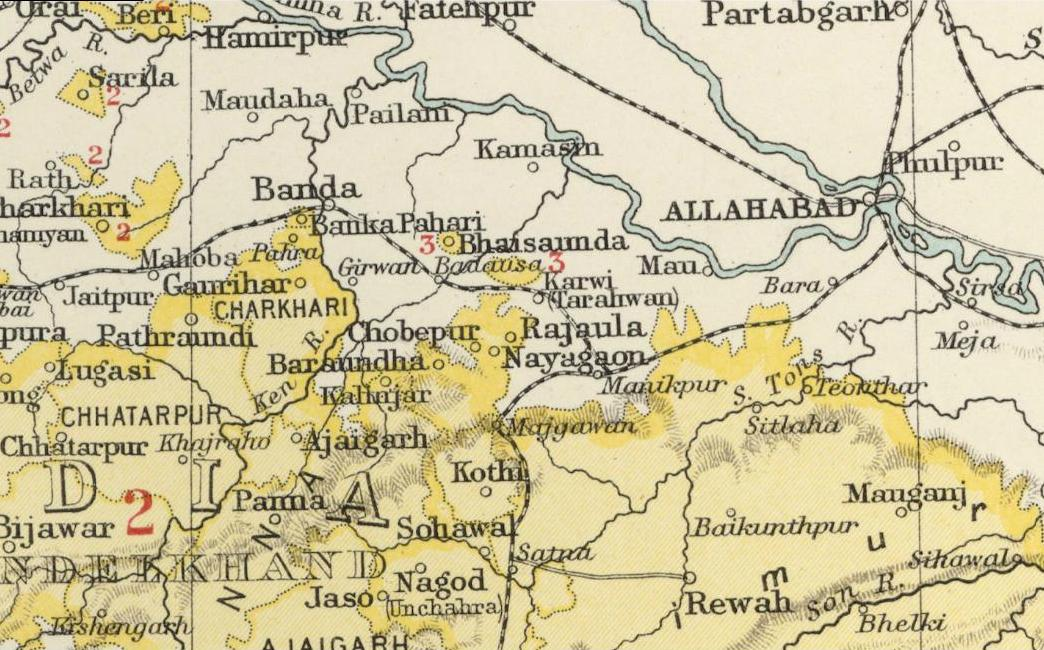
- The area of the Chaube Jagirs in the Imperial Gazetteer of India
- Area
  - 1901: 247 km^{2} (95 sq mi)
- Population
  - 1901: 20,711
- Government
  - Type: British protectorate
- History
  - Established: 1812
  - Accession to the Indian Union: 1948
  - World War II: 1939-1945
Succeeded by
India
- Today part of: India

The Chaube Jagirs, also known as Kalinjar Chaubes, jagir states were a group of five feudal states of Central India during the period of the British Raj. They were a British protectorate from 1823 to 1947 and belonged to the Bagelkhand Agency. Their last rulers acceded to India in 1948.

Bhagwati Prasad Chaube is the son of Chaube Ram Prasad a railway officer in British Era they belong to Bhaisunda state.

Last ruler of Pahra state is Chaube Laxmi Prasad his elder son Radhakrishna Chaube and son of Radhakrishna Chaube is Ashok Kumar Chaube and Narendra Kumar Chaube were live the fortress of Chaubeypur capital of pahra State.

The Current Descendants live in the parts of Central India and in Bundelkhand, most notably in Sagar, Satna and Bina District of Madhya Pradesh,and In Banda district in Uttar Pradesh.There has been many MLAs and MPs from the erstwhile Chaube Family, some were in the INC and some were in the BJP.

== History ==
Gangaram Chaube
- Born: 17th century Bundelkhand, Uttar Pradesh, India
- Died: 1685; Bundelkhand, Uttar Pradesh, India
- Military career
- Allegiance: Choubey

Raja Chhatrasal of Panna State appointed Mandhata Chaube as the killedar of fort Kalinjar. His father Gangaram Chaube, a Jujhautiya Brahmin and gotra vats, commanded Chhatrasal when he raised the banner of revolt against the Mughals in Bundelkhand. Mandhata also repelled many Mughal attempts to occupy the fort. Kherandesh Khan, the faujdar of Itawa, attacked Kalinjar in 1701, but could not capture fort because of Mandhata's stiff resistance.

Later Chaube Brahmin officials rose from gentry to nobility. The owners of the first four estates were descendants of Ram Kishan, the former governor of Kalinjar under Raja Hirde Sah of Panna. Ram Kishan Chaube lost the siege of Kalinjar Ali Bahadur I died during the long siege. Later Chaubes occupied the fort and Ram Kishan declared Independence.

In 1812 Gotras of Chaube jagir is Vats, Gautam, Bhardwaj.

In 1862 the jagirdars were granted a sanad of adoption. The rule was that when no heirs were available an estate was split between the other members. The initial nine principalities by 1839 were reduced by two. In 1855 one estate was seized owing to the implication of the ruler in a murder case. In 1864 another principality was extinguished, leaving only five.

The Jagirdars were under the Bundelkhand Agency of the Central India Agency until 1896 when they were transferred to the Baghelkhand Agency. In 1931 they returned to the Bundelkhand Agency.

== Chaube estates ==
The five surviving estates were:

- Bhaisunda
- Kamta-Rajaula
- Pahra
- Paldeo
- Taraon

=== Annexed by the British ===
Three states were confiscated by the British:

- Purwa with nine villages and an area of 53.18 km^{2} was annexed in 1855.
- Nayagaon with 18 villages and an area of 65.11 km^{2} was annexed in 1864.

== See also ==
- Panna State
- Vindhya Pradesh
