= Chaubey =

Chaubey is a Hindu Brahmins commonly originating from India meaning knower of four Vedas, similar to the surname Choubey, Chaturvedi . Notable people with the surname include:

- Abhishek Chaubey (born 1977), Indian film director and screenwriter
- Kalyan Chaubey (born 1976), Indian footballer
- Lalmuni Chaubey (1942–2016), Indian politician
- Vinod Chaubey (died 2009), Indian police officer,
- Suriya Chaubey (2002-present), Indian Comedian
- Arayan Chaubey (2004-present), Indian Striker

== See also ==
- Choubey
