= Choubey =

Choubey interchangeable with Chaubey is a surname of Hindu Brahmins commonly originating from India meaning knower of four Vedas. Notable people with the surname include:

- Ashwini Kumar Choubey (born 1953), Indian politician
- Balswarup Choubey (1934–2011), Indian nephrologist and medical academic
- Narayan Choubey (1923–?), Indian politician
- Santosh Choubey (born 1955), Indian social entrepreneur, educationalist, poet, and writer

== See also ==
- Chaubey

aayushmaan
