= Vijaynagar State =

Former princely state in Gujarat, India

Coordinates: 23.6°N 72.95°E

Vijaynagar State Pol State વિજયનગર
- Princely State of British India
- 1577–1948
- Flag
- Area
  - 1931: 350 km^{2} (140 sq mi)
- Population
  - 1931: 8,491
- History
  - Established: 1577
  - Indian independence: 1948
Succeeded by
India

Vijaynagar State, known as Pol State before 1934 and also called Ghodadar for a short time, was a princely state under the Mahi Kantha Agency, Bombay Presidency in NE Gujarat during the British Raj. The capital of the state was in Vijaynagar taluka, Sabarkantha district. The state's last ruler signed the accession to the Indian Union on 8 August 1947.

== History ==
Pol state was founded in 1577. Between 1864 and 1877 it was renamed Vijayanagar after its new capital. The rulers of the state bore the title 'Rao'.

=== Rulers ===
- .... – 1720 Chandrasinhji (d. 1720)
- 1720 – 1728 Kesarisinhji
- 1728 – .... Kasansinhji
- .... – .... Makansinhji
- .... – .... Hathisinhji
- .... – .... Madhavsinhji
- .... – .... Ajabsinhji
- .... – .... Bhupatsinhji I
- .... – .... Bhavansinhji
- .... – .... Surajsinhji
- .... – .... Vajesinhji
- .... – .... Ratansinhji
- .... – .... Abheysinhji
- .... – .... Kiratsinhji
- .... – .... Laxmansinhji
- .... – .... Bharatsinhji
- .... – .... Amarsinhji
- .... – 1852 Anandsinhji
- 1852 – 1859 Pahadsinhji Gulabsinhji (b. 1839 – d. 1859)
- 1859 – 1864 Navalsinhji (d. 1864)
- 23 Nov 1864 – 24 October 1889 Hamirsinhji I Gulabsinhji (b. 1840 – d. 1889)
- 24 Oct 1889 – 1905 Prithisinhji Hamirsinhji (b. 1872 – d. 1905)
- Feb 1906 – 1913 Bhupatsinhji II Hamirsinhji (b. 1885 – d. 1913)
- 1913 – 17 November 1914 Mohabatsinhji Bhupatsinhji (b. 1883 – d. 1914)
- 17 Nov 1914 – 1947 Hamirsinhji II Hindupatsinhji (b. 1902/4 – d. 1986)
- 17 Nov 1914 – 1924 .... -Regent

== See also ==
- Mahi Kantha Agency
- Sabarkantha district
