= Jaso State =

Coordinates: 24.57°N 80.58°E

- Princely State
- 1732–1948
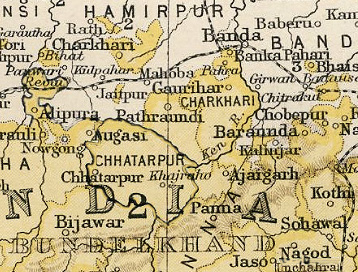
- Jaso State in the Imperial Gazetteer of India
- Area
  - 1901: 186 km^{2} (72 sq mi)
- Population
  - 1901: 7,209
- History
  - Established: 1732
  - Independence of India: 1948
Succeeded by
India
- Hunter, Sir William Wilson. The Imperial Gazetteer of India. London, Trübner & co., 1885.

Jaso or Jassu, formerly known as Yashogarh was a princely state of the Bundelkhand Agency in British India located in present-day Nagod tehsil, Satna district, Madhya Pradesh, 44 km west from the district headquarters. It was surrounded in the north, east and south by Nagod State and in the east by Ajaigarh.

== History ==
Jaso State was founded in 1732 by Bharti Chand, younger brother of Raja Hrideshah of Panna. Around 1750, it was split into Bandhora and Jaso, being reunited later in the eighteenth century. In 1816 Jaso State became a British protectorate. The last ruler of the state signed the accession of Jaso State to the Indian Union in 1948.

== Rulers ==
Rulers bore the title of Diwan

- 1732 – 1750 Bharti Chand
- 1750 – 1775 Hari Singh
- 1775 – 1786 Chet Singh
- 1786 – 1830 Murat Singh
- 1830 – 1860 Ishri Singh (b. ... – d. 1860)
- 1860 – 1865 Ram Singh (b. ... – d. 1860)
- 1860 – 1869 Shatarjit Singh (adopted son and descendant of Dewan Chet Singh)
- 1869 – 1876 Bhopal Singh
- 1876 – 1888 Gajraj Singh
- 1888 – 1889 Chhatrapati Singh
- 7 July 1889 – 1900 Jagat Raj Singh
- 1900 – 1918 Girwar Singh
- 1918 – 1942 Ram Pratap Singh
- 1947 – 2020 Anand Pratap Singh
- 2020–present Harsh Pratap Singh

=== Rulers of Bandhora ===
Durjan Singh and Medni Singh ruled as the Dewans of Bandhora when the state was split from Jaso in the 18th century.

== See also ==
- Bagelkhand Agency
- List of Indian princely states
- Jaso
