= Mansa State =

Mansa Princely State
- 1812–1948
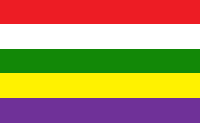
- Flag

- Capital: Mansa
- Demonym: Manswala
- Government
  - Type: Absolute Monarchy
- Historical era: 19th century to 20th century
  - Established: 1812
  - Disestablished: 1948
- Political subdivisions: British Raj
- Today part of: Gujarat, India

Mansa State was a Gujarati princely state under the British Raj, located within the Mahi Kantha Agency of the Bombay Presidency, in the present-day Gandhinagar district, Gujarat, with third-class non-salute status.

== History ==
The rulers of Mansa, trace their origins back to Emperor Vanraj Chavda, the legendary 8th-century ruler who founded the great empire of Anhilwad Patan in 746 CE.

In around 942CE, the Chavda dynasty fell, and the throne of Pathan was taken by the Chauluakya dynasty.

This led the dynasty to migrate into the south and east toward the regions of the Sabarmati and Mahi river valleys to carve out their new territories. Over the centuries, they established more smaller, fiercely independent fortifications, including the neighbouring estates of Varsoda and Mansa. As the encroaching powers of the Gujarati sultanate an the Mughal empire came through the region, the Chavda chieftans, paid the peshkash, and remained under overrule of the larger empires.

By the 18th century, as the Mughal authority crumbled, Western India was heavily raided by the onslaught of the Marathas. Mansa fell under the predatory revenue-collection system of the Gaekwad dynasty of Baroda, who then routinely sent military expeditions Mulkgiri to forcefully collect taxes. Around the same time, the British East India company, now having grown influential, negotiated a permanent settlement wherein a fixed, guaranteed tribute would be paid by Mansa to the Gaekwad of Baroda which was guarantee by British laws, called the Mahi Kantha settlement.

And so in 1812, it became a settlement under the Mahi Kantha Agency as a tributary to the British Raj, as a third-class non-salute state.

== Ruling family & designation ==
The ruler of Mansa state was called Raolji (meaning; Lord or ruler), they belonged to the Rajput clan and descended from the Chavda Dynasty. A notable member was Raolji Shri Takhatsinhji Kesrisinhji, who was educated in Rajkumar College in Rajkot, and propelled Mansa to become a modern and industrialised capital.

The Palace of the ruling Mansa family was Sajjan Vilas Palace.

=== Titulature and rank ===
- Raolji- ruling regent/ Maharaja
- Rani Sahiba- female ruling regent/ wife of ruling regent/ Maharani
- Yuvraj - Crown Prince/ Hier presumptive
- Yuvrani - Crown Princess/ Hier presumptive
- Rajmata - Queen mother/ mother of ruling regent/ grandmother of ruling regent.
- Rajkumar- Prince/ son/ brother of ruling regent
- Rajkumari - Princess/ daughter/ sister of ruling regent

== Coat of arms of Mansa state ==
A fess, argent, thereon a "cheval" (Horse) fesswise, proper; in the base, argent "Agni hotra" (firepit) proper;. Crest: A bow and arrow with "Om" designation in Or atop, with crest motto "Shree Gurubhyo Namah"(Salutations to the Lord). Supporters: Horses, dexter, the rear left foot, and sinister, the front feet on the compartment, all proper. Motto: "Raolji Shree Mansa Sansthan" (The Rajoli's sacred lan of Mansa) in Gujarati, followed by "Chāpotkata Kula Bhūshanam" (Ornament of the Chavda clan) argent on Or riband.

== Modern era and accession to independence ==
Exactly on June 10, 1948, the final ruling monarch, Raolji Shri Sajansinhji, officially signed the Instrument of Accession, transferring Mansa into the newly formed Indian nation.

== Rulers of Mansa state ==
- Raolji Shri Raubhaji (early 18th century)
- Raolji Shri Gamshinhji (mid-late 18th century)
- Raolji Shri Bhimsinhji (mid 19th century, died 1886)
- Raolji Shri Rajsinhji Bhimsinhji (1886 – 1889)
- Raolji Shri Takhatsinhji Kesrisinhji (May 18, 1889 – January 4, 1934)
- Raolji Shri Sajjansinhji Takhatsinhji (January 4, 1934 – June 10, 1948) last official ruler.

=== Titular heads ===
- Raol Shri Vanrajsinhji Sajjansinhji (June 10, 1948 – Present) succeeded father as titular head of Mansa.
