= Kamta-Rajaula State =

Princely state in British India (1812–1948)

Coordinates: 25°11′N 80°51′E

Kamta-Rajaula State कामता-राजुला रियासत
- Princely Estate (Jagir)
- 1812–1948
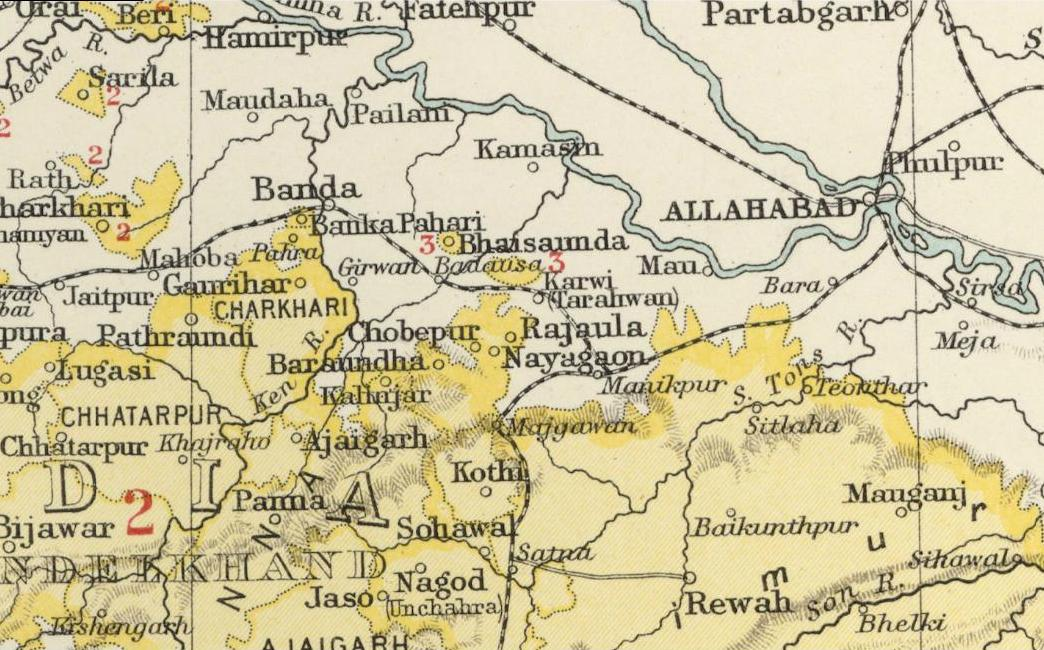
- The area of the Chaube Jagirs in the Imperial Gazetteer of India
- Area
  - 1901: 34 km^{2} (13 sq mi)
- Population
  - 1901: 1,232
- History
  - Established: 1812
  - Independence of India: 1948
Succeeded by
India

Kamta-Rajaula was a princely state in India during the British Raj.

== History ==
It was one of the Chaube Jagirs, part of the Bagelkhand Agency which was merged into the Indian state of Vindhya Pradesh in 1948.

Kamta-Rajaula was a place of pilgrimage, for according to legend it was one of the places where Rama had been. The capital was the village of Rajaula, located at 15 km from Karwi railway station.

== Rulers ==
The rulers of Kamta-Rajaula were titled 'Rao'.

=== Raos ===
- 1812 - 1874 Gopal Lal
- 1874 - 1892 Bharat Prasad
- 1892 - 1906 Ram Prasad
- 1906 - 1946 Radha Kishan
- 1946 - 1947 Rajiv Nandan Prasad

== See also ==
- Bundelkhand Agency
- Political integration of India
