= Pahra =

Jagir (feudal land grant) in British India (1812–1948)

Coordinates: 25°06′N 80°48′E

Pahra State
- Jagir
- 1812–1948
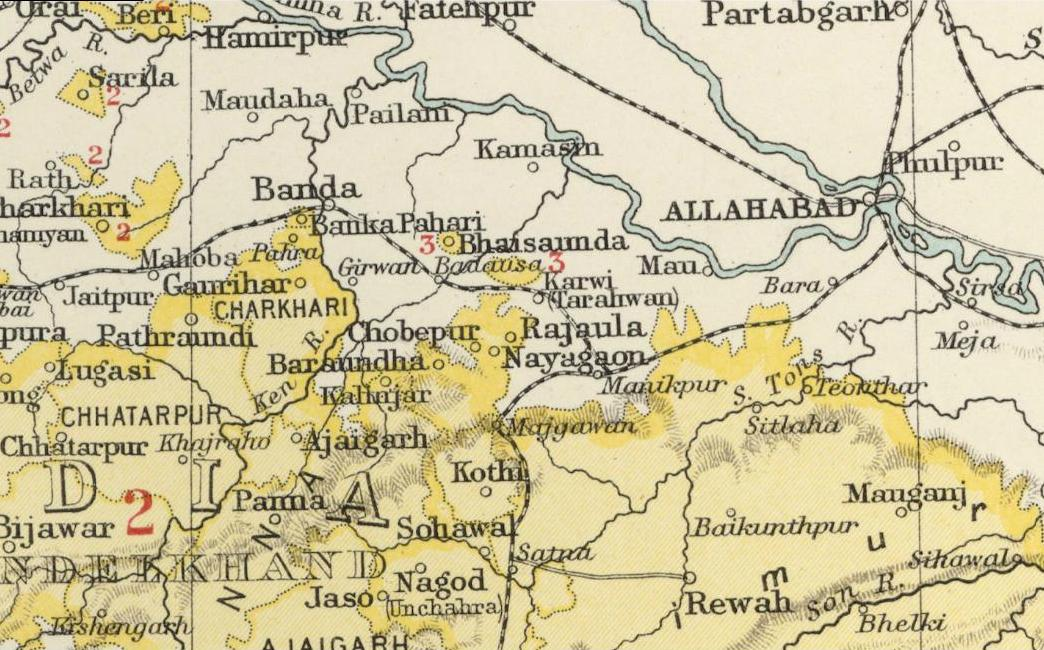
- Pahra (Chobepur) in the Imperial Gazetteer of India
- Area
  - 1901: 69.92 km^{2} (27.00 sq mi)
- Population
  - 1901: 3,496
- History
  - Established: 1812
  - Independence of India: 1948
Succeeded by
India

Pahra was a jagir in India during the British Raj. It was under the Bundelkhand Agency of the Central India Agency until 1896 when it was transferred to the Baghelkhand Agency. It was later transferred back to the Bundelkhand Agency.

Pahra had an area of 69.92 km^{2}. In 1931 the population of the small state was of 3,496 inhabitants distributed in 31 villages. The principality was merged into the Indian state of Vindhya Pradesh in 1948.

== History ==
Pahra was founded in 1812 when a sanad was granted to Sālig Rām Chaube, son of Rām Kishan of Kalinjar, confirming him in the possession of the territory. It was one of the Chaube Jagirs of the area. The state was centered in the small town of Chaubepur (Chobepur), which had a population of 878 in 1901.

=== Rulers ===
Pahra's rulers were descendants of Ram Krishna Chaube, the Kiladar —governor of the fort— of Kalinjar.

- 1812 - .... Chaube Sālig Rām
- .... - 1868 Chaube Maksudan Prasad
- 1868 - .... Chaube Radha Charan (was invested with full ruling powers in 1879)

== See also ==
- Political integration of India
