= Paldeo =

Princely estate in British India (1812–1948)

Coordinates: 25°06′N 80°50′E

Paldeo State
- Princely Estate (Jagir)
- 1812–1948
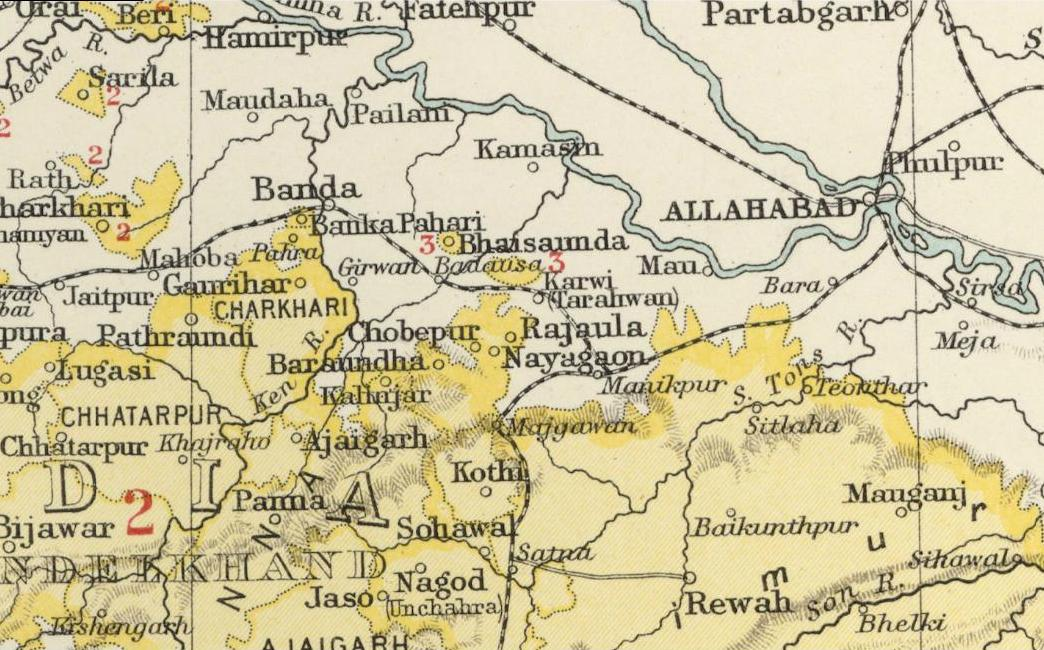
- Paldeo (Nayagaon) in the Imperial Gazetteer of India
- Area
  - 1901: 73 km^{2} (28 sq mi)
- Population
  - 1901: 8,598
- History
  - Established: 1812
  - Independence of India: 1948
Succeeded by
India

Paldeo, also spelt 'Paldev', was a princely estate (Jagir) in India during the British Raj. It was under the Bundelkhand Agency of the Central India Agency until 1896 when it was transferred to the Baghelkhand Agency. In 1931, it was transferred back to the Bundelkhand Agency.

It had an area of 52 square miles. In 1940, its population was 9,820 distributed in 18 villages. Paldeo Estate was merged into the Indian state of Vindhya Pradesh in 1948.

== History ==
Paldeo was founded in 1812. It was one of the Chaube Jagirs.

=== Rulers ===
Paldeo's rulers bore the title 'Rao'.

==== Raos ====
- 1812 - 1840 Dariao Singh (d. 1840)
- 1840 - Nathu Ram
- 1840 - Oct 1842 Raja Ram (d. 1842)
- 1842 - 1865 Sheo Prasad (d. 1865)
- 1865 - 2 Apr 1874 Mukund Singh (d. 1874)
- 2 Apr 1874 - 1891 Anrudh Singh (b. 1837 - d. 1891) (personal style 'Rao' from 1877)
- 1891 - 1894 Narayan Das (b. 1836 - d. 1894)
- 16 Feb 1894 - 2 Oct 1923 Jagat Rai (b. 1865 - d. 1923)
- 3 Oct 1923 - 1947 Shiva Prasad (b. 1908 - d. 1954)

== See also ==
- Bundelkhand Agency
- Political integration of India
