= Taraon =

Village in the Ghazipur District of Uttar Pradesh, India

Taraon is a village in the Ghazipur District of Uttar Pradesh, India.

The village of Taraon falls under the jurisdiction of the Taraon Panchayat. It is located 31 kilometres (19 mi) East of Ghazipur, on the border of the Ghazipur and Buxer districts. It is 13 kilometres (8.1 mi) from nearby Yusufpur Mohammadabad, and 371 kilometres (231 mi) from the state capital of Lucknow.

Taraon Pin code is 233231 and postal head office is Bhanwarkol.

Taraon is bordered by the Yusufpur Mohammadabad tehsil to the west. It may be reached by rail via the nearby Buxar or Yusufpur Railway Station (13 kilometres (8.1 mi) distant).

The local language is Hindi and Bhojpuri.
