= Sohawal State =

Former colonial satellite state

Coordinates: 24°35′N 80°46′E

- Princely State of British India
- 1550–1950
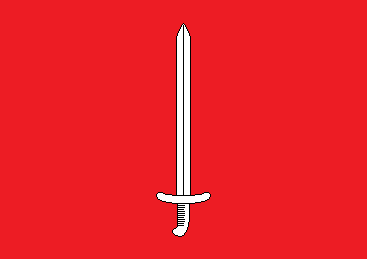
- Flag

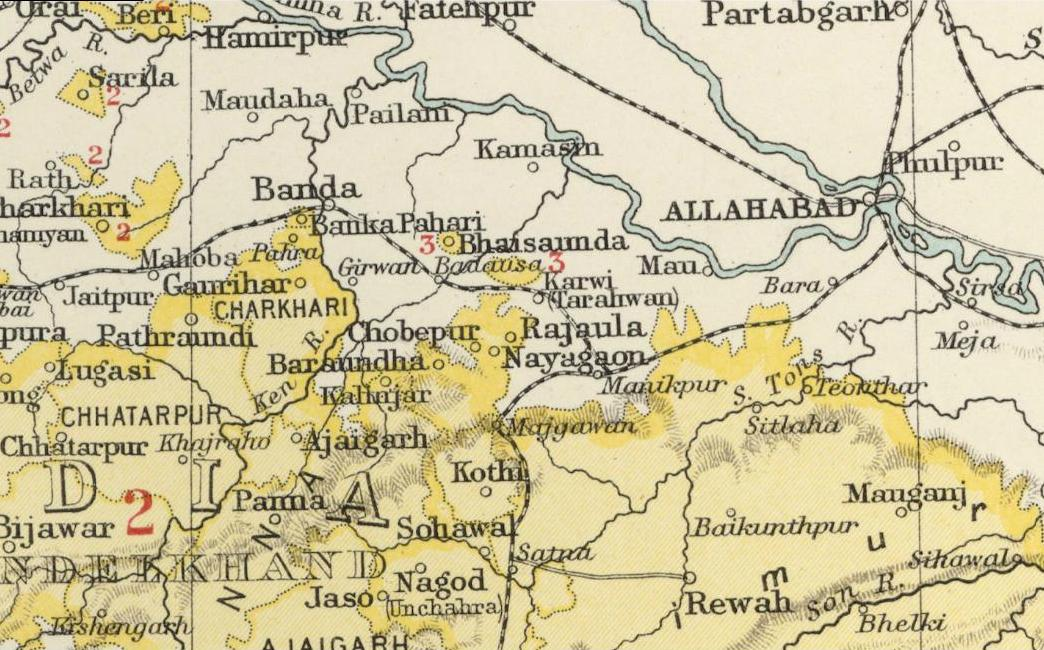
- Sohawal State in the Imperial Gazetteer of India
- Area
  - 1901: 552 km^{2} (213 sq mi)
- Population
  - 1901: 32,216
- History
  - Established: 1550
  - Independence of India: 1950
Succeeded by
India
- Today part of: Madhya Pradesh, India

Sohawal State was a princely state of the Bagelkhand Agency of the British Raj. It was a relatively small Sanad state of about 552 km^{2} with a population of 32,216 inhabitants in 1901. Its capital was at Sohawal, a small town — 2,108 inhabitants in 1901 — located in modern Satna district of Madhya Pradesh.

The state was divided in two sections separated by territory belonging to Kothi State and in its northern side it formed little enclaves within neighbouring Panna State.

== History ==
Sohawal State was founded in the mid sixteenth century by a ruler named Fateh Singh Baghel with the help of his trust companion Lal Jagat Rai Singh Baghel of Kothi State. It had been originally much larger, but lost much territory within the first centuries of its existence. Fateh Singh Baghel was the youngest son of Maharaja Amar Singh II of Rewa.

Sohawal became a British protectorate initially subordinate to Panna State, but a separate sanad was granted to Rais Aman Singh in 1809. During the 1830 – 1833 period there was an interregnum in which Sohawal came under direct British administration.

The last ruler of Sohawal signed the instrument of accession to the Indian Union on 1 January 1950.

=== Rulers ===
The rulers of the state included:

- 1650 - .... Fateh Singh Baghel
- .... – .... Prithvi Raj Singh
- .... – 1750 Prithipal Singh
- .... – .... ....
- bf.1809 – 18.. Lal Aman Singh (1st time)
- 18.. – 1830 Raghunath Singh (d. 1830/33)
- 1830 – 1833 Vacant
- 1833 – 1840 Lal Aman Singh (2nd time)
- 1840 – 1865 Sheo Singh (d. 1865)
- 1 November 1865 – 1899 Sher Jang Bahadur Singh (b. 1853 – d. 1899) (personal style Raja from 1 January 1879)
- 23 Nov 1899 – 1911 Bhagwant Raj Bahadur Singh (b. 1878 – d. 1930)

==== Title Raja ====
- 1911 – 16 February 1930 Bhagwant Raj Bahadur Singh (s.a.)
- 1930 – 15 August 1947 Jagendra Bahadur Singh (b. 1899 – d. 1974)

== See also ==
- Political integration of India
- Vindhya Pradesh
