= Bhaisunda =

Princely state in British India (1812–1948)

Bhaisunda State
- Princely Estate (Jagir)
- 1812–1948
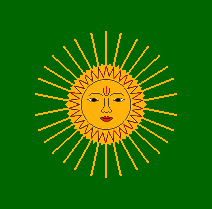
- Flag

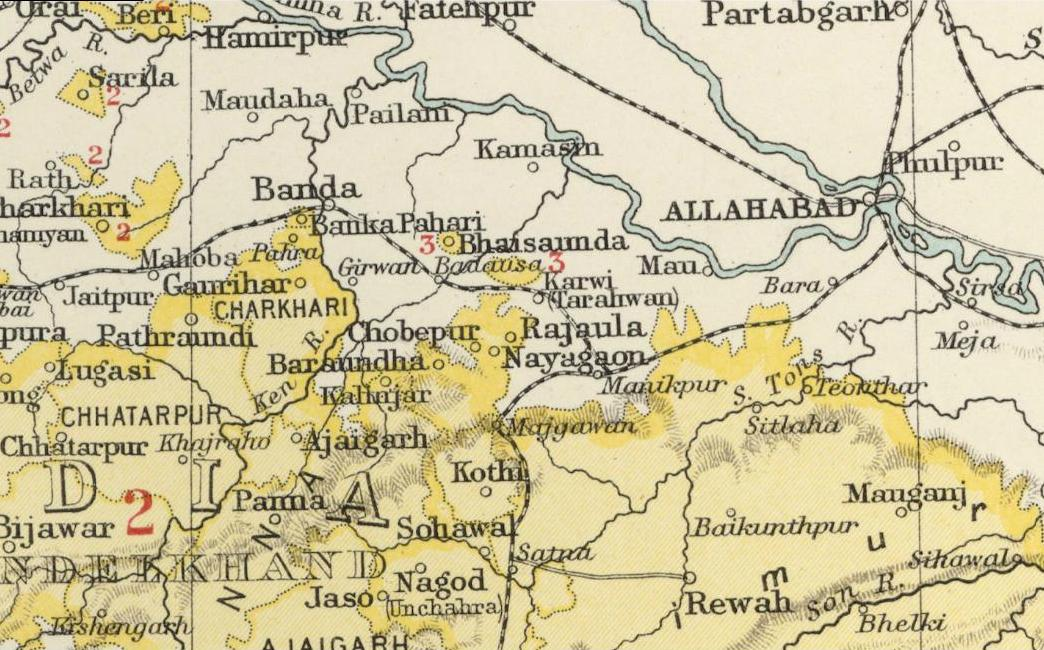
- Bhaisunda State in the Imperial Gazetteer of India
- Area
  - 1901: 83 km^{2} (32 sq mi)
- Population
  - 1901: 4,168
- History
  - Established: 1812
  - Independence of India: 1948
Succeeded by
India

Bhaisunda, also spelt 'Bhaisaunda', was a princely state in India during the British Raj.

Bhagwati Prasad Chaube is the son of Chaube Ram Prasad a railway officer and Ruler in British Era they belong to Bhaisunda state.

== History ==
Bhaisaunda state was founded in 1812 by the Kalinjar family. It was one of the Chaube Jagirs, which were part of the Bagelkhand Agency of British India.

Practically all the inhabitants of the Jagir were Hindu. The capital was the village of Bhaisunda, located at 25° 18′ N, 80° 48′ E.. In 1948, one year after Indian independence, Bhaisunda was merged into the Indian state of Vindhya Pradesh.

Chaube Nawal Kishor had two sons named Acharju Singh and Hindupath Singh. Chaube Nawal Kishor Chaubey Naval Kishore made a family alliance between his two sons in which Acharju Singh will become the Sanad successor and his younger brother will become the common successor but both will become Raja .The first successors of both the brothers later became Rajas.

=== Rulers ===
The rulers of Bhaisunda were titled 'Chaube' and from 1885, 'Rao Chaube'.

==== Chaubes ====
- 1812 - 1829 Newal Kishor (d. 1829)
- 1829 - 18.. Acharju Singh (b. c.1819 - d. ... )
- 1829 - 1840 Zirat Prasad -Regent
- 1840? - 10 Oct 1885 Tirath Prasad (b. 1822 - d. 1885)

==== Rao Chaubes ====
- 10 Oct 1885 - 8 Jan 1916 Chhatarsal Prasad (b. 1877 - d. 1916)
- 10 Oct 1885 - 1896 Gaya Prasad -Regent
- 8 Jan 1916 - 4 Nov 1916 Bharat Prasad (b. 1884 - d. 1916)
- 4 Nov 1916 - 1947 Govind Prasad (b. 1884 - d. af.1948)
- The lineage of Chaube Hindupath singh —
- Kishor Singh
- Dhakkan Prasad
- Lalau Lal
- Manna Lal
- Mangal Prasad And their wifi Gulabi Devi Chaube was the revenue contractor for the Pili Kothi, Sarai , Chhavni ,Sabji Mandi, and Kaithi Bazar areas of Banda City and the first female zamidar in Chaube family
- Ram Prasad, he was the railway officer during British Era (1948)
- Bhagwati Prasad , Son of Chaube Ram Prasad.

== See also ==
- Bundelkhand Agency
- Political integration of India
