= Nagod State =

State in British India

Coordinates: 24.57°N 80.6°E

- Former Princely State
- 1344–1950
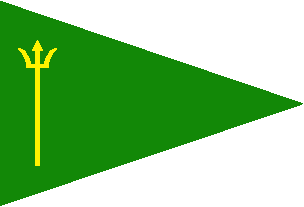
- Flag

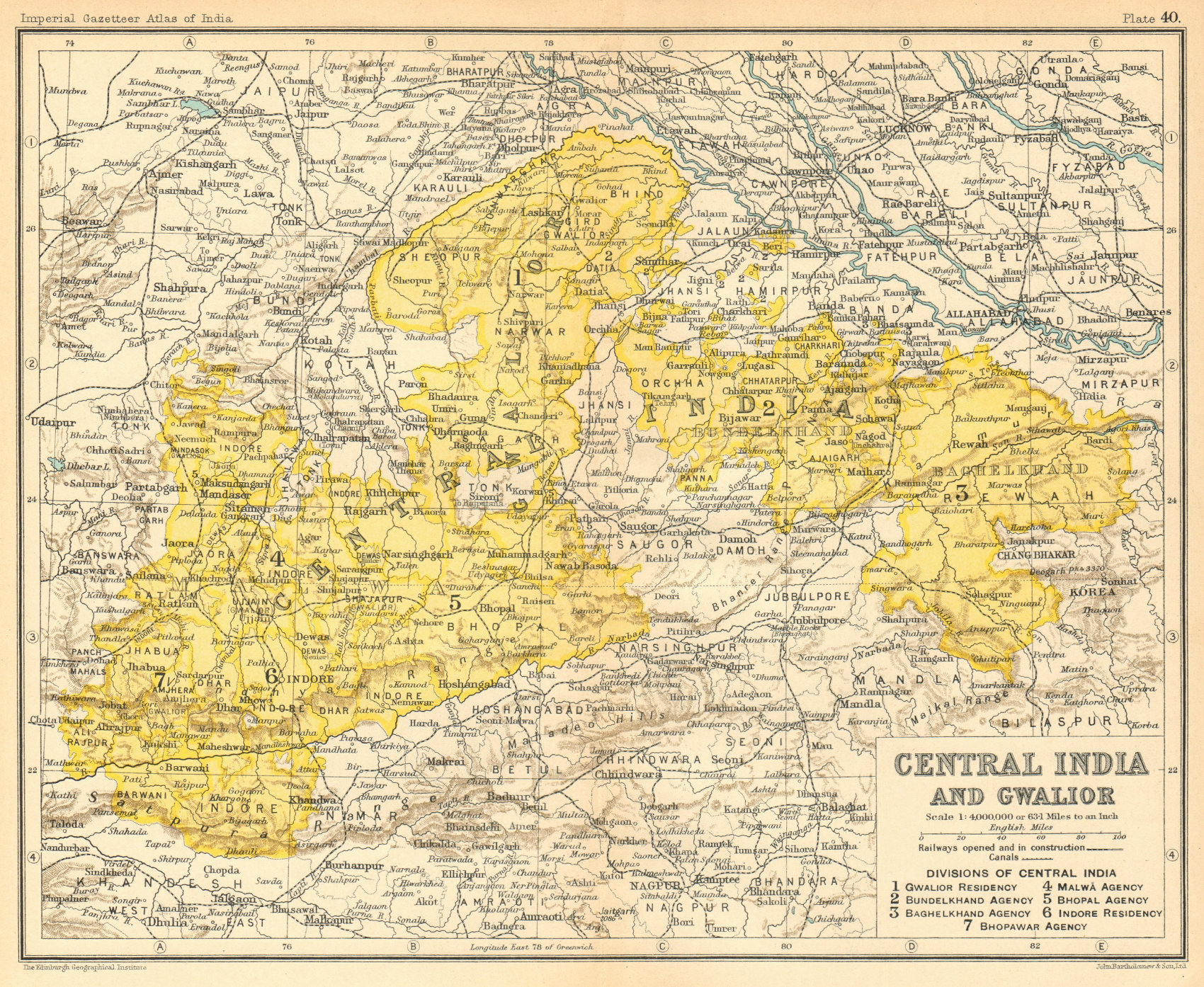
- Nagod State in the Imperial Gazetteer of India on the left of Rewa State
- Area
  - 1901: 1,298 km^{2} (501 sq mi)
- Population
  - 1901: 67,092
- History
  - Established: 1344
  - Accession to India: 1950
Succeeded by
India

Nagod State (also known as 'Nagode' and 'Nagodh') was a princely state of colonial India ruled by Parihar Rajputs, located in modern Satna district of Madhya Pradesh. The state was known as 'Unchahara' after Unchehara, its original capital until the 18th century.

== History ==
In 1344, the city of Uchchakalpa, present-day Unchahara, was founded by Raja Veerraj Judeo when he seized the fort of Naro from "the others". In 1720 the state was renamed Nagod after its new capital. In 1807 Nagod was a tributary to Panna and was included in the sanad granted to that state. In 1809, however, Lal Sheoraj Singh was recognized and confirmed in his territory by a separate sanad granted to him. Nagod State became a British protectorate after the treaty of Bassein in 1820. Raja Balbhadra Singh was deposed in 1831 for murdering his brother. The state fell into debt and in 1844 the administration was taken over by the British owing to economic mismanagement. The ruler was loyal during the Indian Mutiny in 1857 and was granted the pargana of Dhanwahl. In 1862 the Raja was granted a sanad allowing adoption and in 1865 local rule was reestablished. Nagod State was a part of Baghelkhand Agency from 1871 till 1931, when it was transferred along with other smaller states back to Bundelkhand Agency. The last Raja of Nagod, HH Shrimant Mahendra Singh, signed the accession of his state to the Indian Union on 1 January 1950.

== Rulers ==
The Nagod Parihar dynasty ruling family members were entitled to a hereditary gun salute of 9 guns. Kunwar Arunoday Singh Parihar,.

List of Imperial parihar dynasty rulers
Serial No.	Ruler	Reign
1	Raja Veer Raj Ju Deo	1325–1357
2	Raja Jug Raj Deo	1357–1375
3	Raja Dhar Singh Ju Deo	1357–1375
4	Raja Kishan Das Ju Deo	1375–1400
5	Raja Vikramaditya Ju Deo	1400–1424
6	Raja Bharti Chand	1424–1446
7	Raja Gurpal Singh	1446–1469
8	Raja Suraj Pal Ju Deo	1469–1491
9	Raja Bhoj Raj Ju Deo	1491–1523
10	Raja Karan Singh Ju Deo	1523–1560
11	Raja Pratap Rudra Deo	1560–1593
12	Raja Narendra Shah Ju Deo	1593–1612
13	Raja Bharat Shah Ju Deo	1612–1648
14	Raja Prithviraj Singh	1648–1685
15	Raja Fakir Shah	1685–1721
16	Raja Ahlad Singh	1721–1780
17	Raja Shiv Raj Singh	1780–1818
18	Raja Balabhadra Ju Deo	1818–1831
19	Raja Raghavendra Singh	1831–1874
20	Raja Yadavendra Singh	1874–1922
21	Raja Narendra Singh	1922–1926
22	HH Raja Shrimant Mahendra Singh Ju Deo Bahadur	1926–1981
23	HH Raja Shrimant Rudrendra Pratap Singh Ju Deo Bahadur	1981–2005
24	HH Raja Shrimant Shivendra Singh Ju Deo Bahadur	2005–present

== See also ==
- Panna State
- Political integration of India
