= Baraundha =

Indian princely state (1169–1950)

Coordinates: 25°03′N 80°38′E

Baraundha State Pathar Kachhar
- Princely State of British India
- 1169–1950
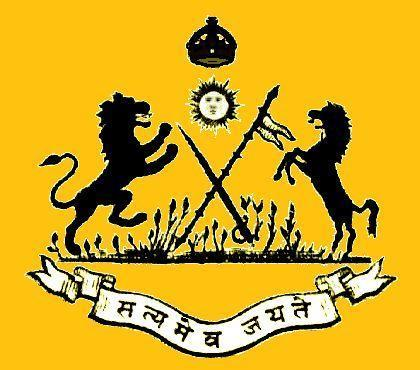
- Coat of arms

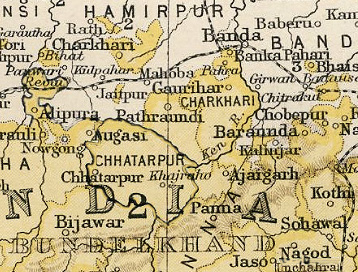
- Baraundha State in the Imperial Gazetteer of India
- Area
  - 1892: 904 km^{2} (349 sq mi)
- Population
  - 1892: 17,283
- History
  - Established: 1169
  - Independence of India: 1 January 1950
Succeeded by
India
- Princely States of India A-J

Baraundha (also known as Pathar Kachhar) was a princely state of colonial India, located in modern Satna district of Madhya Pradesh. Although historically far larger, at the time of Indian independence in 1950, it was a saluted state of 9 guns.

== History ==
Maharaja Raghubar Dayal Singh entitled "His Highness" and salute of "9 Guns" in 1877 at imperial assemblage of British.

== Rulers ==
- 1790 – 4 Jan 1827 Mohan Singh (d. 1827)
- 1827 – 1867 Sarabjit Singh (d. 1867)
- 1874 – 1885 Raghubar Dayal Singh (b. 1840 – d. 1885) ( Raja Bahadur from 1 Jan 1877)
- 18 Aug 1886 – 8 Jul 1908 Maharaja Ram Pratap Singh (b. 1847 – d. 1908)

=== Rajas ===
- 1908 – 1933 Gaya Prasad Singh (b. 1865 – d. 1933)
- 1933 – 15 Aug 1947 Ram Pratap Singh last ruler of the state

== See also ==
- Political integration of India
- Vindhya Pradesh
