= Kothi State =

Princely state in India

Coordinates: 24°46′N 80°46′E

- Princely State of British India
- 17th century–1950
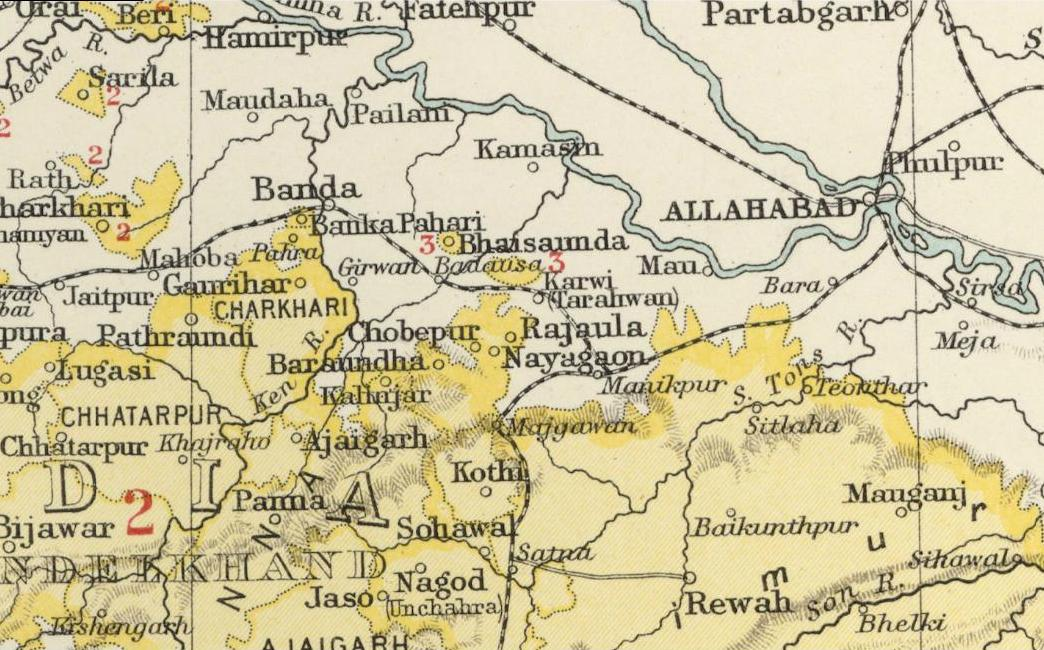
- Kothi State in the Imperial Gazetteer of India
- Capital: Kothi
- Area
  - 1901: 438 km^{2} (169 sq mi)
- Population
  - 1901: 19,112
- History
  - Established: 17th century
  - Accession to India: 1950
Succeeded by
India
- Today part of: Madhya Pradesh, India

Kothi State (or Koti State) was a princely state of the British Raj. It belonged to the Bagelkhand Agency of Central India. Its capital was at Kothi, in modern Satna district of Madhya Pradesh. It was a relatively small Sanad.

== History ==
Maharaja Vyaghradev Solanki, a scion of Anhilwara Patan in Gujrat, fl. 1234 A.D. (631 H.E.), he laid foundation of Baghelkhand (House of Baghel); married Maharani Singhumati, daughter of Makund Dev Chandravat, and had issue, five sons.

-Maharaja Karan Dev, succeeded to Rewah.

-Kirti Dev

-Surya Dev

-Shyam Dev

-Rao Kandhar Dev, ancestor of the Bara Rajas or the Raos of Kasauta (Shankergarh).

Rao Kandhar Dev who was the 5th son of Maharaja Vyaghradev of Rewah, born 663 Samvat, in 683 Samvat his elder brother conferred on him the title of Rao (and later on the title of 'Maharao') with Illaka Pardhwan, which yielded an income of Rs. 12 Lac per annum, from that time the family is known as the Kasauta Rao family who ruled the area of Shankergarh, which comes under Prayagraj district of Uttar Pradesh and in the mid of 17th century one of their descendant Jagat Rai Singh Baghel migrated towards present day Satna and established the Kothi Princely State, presently which comes under Satna district of Madhya Pradesh.

The Rao Sahibs of Churhat (the royal family of Churhat, Sidhi, Madhya Pradesh) were also descendants of the Kasauta Rao family of Shankergarh (Prayagraj, Uttar Pradesh).

Thakur Ranmat Singh Baghel (from Mankhari village, Satna) and his uncle, Thakur Shyam Shah Baghel, were both prominent leaders of the 1857 revolt in Baghelkhand, and they were also descendants of the Kothi royal family (Kothi Princely State).

Kothi State was founded in the mid of 17th century by a Baghel Rajput ruler who expelled the former Bharr ruler of the area.

Towards the beginning of the nineteenth century, and in much the same manner as neighbouring Sohawal, Kothi became a British protectorate initially subordinate to Panna State. However, a separate sanad was granted to Rais Lal Duniyapati Singh in 1810.

The last ruler of Kothi signed the instrument of accession to the Indian Union on 1 January 1950.

=== Rulers ===
Rulers adopted the title Raja Bahadur.

==== Title Rais ====
- 1650 – .... Lal Jagat Rai Singh Baghel
- 180. – .... Lal Duniyapati Singh
- .... – 1862 Lal Abdhut Singh
- 1862 – 5 June 1887 Ran Bahadur Singh

==== Title Raja Bahadur ====
- 1887 – 1895 Bhagwat Bahadur Singh
- 1895 – 8 August 1914 Avadhendra Singh
- 1914 – 1934 Sitaram Pratap Bahadur Singh
- 1934 – 1948 Kaushalendra Pratap Singh
- 1948 - 1970 Govind pratap singh Ju Deo
- 1970 - 2017 Ghanshyam Singh Ju Deo
- 2017 - Harshvardhan Singh Ju Deo

== See also ==
- Political integration of India
- Vindhya Pradesh
