= Banknotes of the Yugoslav dinar in Serbia and Montenegro =

The Yugoslav dinar in Serbia and Montenegro had a number of editions with different banknotes.

== 1992 dinar ==
In 1992, the Federal Republic of Yugoslavia introduced notes for 100, 500, 1000, 5000, 10,000, and 50,000 dinara. The National Bank of Yugoslavia retained the same name in Serbia and Montenegro and modeled the designs after some of the previous series of Yugoslav dinar notes.

In 1993, owing to hyperinflation, the higher value notes were introduced for 100,000, 500,000, 1,000,000, 5,000,000, 10,000,000, 50,000,000, 100,000,000, 500,000,000, 1,000,000,000, and 10,000,000,000 dinara.

Issues bore the emblem of the National Bank. They featured a dual display of Serbo-Croatian in Cyrillic and Latin.

1992–1993 Series
| Obverse | Reverse | Value | Size (mm) | Colour | Obverse | Reverse | First printed date | Issued | Withdrawn |
|---|---|---|---|---|---|---|---|---|---|
| | | 100 dinara | 151 × 72 | blue | a young woman | a spike of wheat | 1992 | 1 July 1992 | 10 September 1993 |
| | | 500 dinara | 159 × 76 | violet | a young man | mountain | 1992 | 1 July 1992 | 10 September 1993 |
| | | 1000 dinara | 163 × 78 | red | Nikola Tesla | Tesla coil | 1992 | 1 July 1992 | 1 October 1993 |
| | | 5,000 dinara | 167 × 80 | dark green | Ivo Andrić | Mehmed Paša Sokolović Bridge | 1992 | 1 July 1992 | 1 October 1993 |
| | | 10,000 dinara | 139 × 66 | brown and dark red | a girl | digital art of a human eye | 1992 | 17 December 1992 | 1 October 1993 |
| | | 50,000 dinara | 147 × 70 | green and violet | a boy | rose flowers | 1992 | 20 January 1993 | 1 October 1993 |
| | | 100,000 dinara | 151 × 72 | yellow and green | a young woman | sunflowers | 1993 | 7 April 1993 | 1 October 1993 |
| | | 500,000 dinara | 159 × 76 | blue and orange | a young man | mountain | 1993 | 26 April 1993 | 1 October 1993 |
| | | 1,000,000 dinara | 147 × 70 | blue, pink, and yellow | a boy | Iris flowers | 1993 | 24 June 1993 | 1 October 1993 |
| | | 5,000,000 dinara | 163 × 78 | green and dark red | Nikola Tesla | Tesla coil and Iron Gate II Hydroelectric Power Station | 1993 | 26 May 1993 | 1 December 1993 |
| | | 10,000,000 dinara | 167 × 80 | grey and light green | Ivo Andrić | National Library of Serbia | 1993 | 29 July 1993 | 1 December 1993 |
| | | 50,000,000 dinara | 139 × 66 | pink and grey | a girl | Captain Miša's Mansion | 1993 | 22 July 1993 | 1 December 1993 |
| | | 100,000,000 dinara | 159 × 76 | light blue and grey | a young man | Serbian Academy of Sciences and Arts | 1993 | 6 August 1993 | 1 December 1993 |
| | | 500,000,000 dinara | 151 × 72 | violet and grey | a young woman | Faculty of Agriculture of the University of Belgrade | 1993 | 13 August 1993 | 1 December 1993 |
| | | 1,000,000,000 dinara | 179½ × 82½ | pink and light blue | a girl | Federal Parliament | 1993 | 30 August 1993 | 1 December 1993 |
| | | 10,000,000,000 dinara | 163 × 78 | pink and dark grey | Nikola Tesla | Tesla coil | 1993 | 21 September 1993 | 1 December 1993 |
These images are to scale at 0.7 pixels per millimetre, a standard for world banknotes. Source:

== 1993 dinar ==
In 1993, banknotes for this currency were issued in denominations of 5000, 10,000, 50,000, 500,000, 5,000,000, 50,000,000, 500,000,000, 5,000,000,000, 50,000,000,000, and 500,000,000,000 dinara. The unusual sequence of denominations is a result of the hyperinflation that FR Yugoslavia was suffering from.

1993 Series
| Obverse | Reverse | Value | Size (mm) | Colour | Obverse | Reverse | First printed date | Issued | Withdrawn |
|---|---|---|---|---|---|---|---|---|---|
| | | 5,000 dinara | 159 × 76 | brown and orange | Nikola Tesla | Nikola Tesla Museum | 1993 | 1 October 1993 | 1 January 1994 |
| | | 10,000 dinara | 163 × 78 | brown and green | Vuk Karadžić | Tršić and Tronoša | 1993 | 1 October 1993 | 1 January 1994 |
| | | 50,000 dinara | 139 × 66 | violet and blue | Petar II Petrović Njegoš | Cetinje monastery | 1993 | 14 October 1993 | 1 January 1994 |
| | | 500,000 dinara | 143 × 68 | green and yellow | Dositej Obradović | Hopovo monastery | 1993 | 30 October 1993 | 1 January 1994 |
| | | 5,000,000 dinara | 147 × 70 | brown and green | Karađorđe | Church and mansion of Karađorđe | 1993 | 12 November 1993 | 1 January 1994 |
| | | 50,000,000 dinara | 151 × 72 | red and violet | Mihajlo Pupin | Old Telephone Exchange building | 1993 | 23 November 1993 | 1 January 1994 |
| | | 500,000,000 dinara | 139 × 66 | violet and blue | Jovan Cvijić | Captain Miša's Mansion | 1993 | 2 December 1993 | 1 January 1994 |
| | | 5,000,000,000 dinara | 143 × 68 | Orange and yellow | Đura Jakšić | Vraćevšnica monastery | 1993 | 11 December 1993 | 22 July 1994 |
| | | 50,000,000,000 dinara | 147 × 70 | pink and light blue | Miloš Obrenović | Prince Miloš's Residence | 1993 | 15 December 1993 | 22 July 1994 |
| | | 500,000,000,000 dinara | 151 × 72 | dark red and blue | Jovan Jovanović Zmaj | National Library of Serbia | 1993 | 23 December 1993 | 22 July 1994 |
These images are to scale at 0.7 pixels per millimetre, a standard for world banknotes. Source:

== 1994 dinar ==
In January 1994, notes were issued for 10, 100, 1,000, 5,000, 50,000, 100,000, 500,000, and 10,000,000 dinara. Owing to hyperinflation, they circulated just for a couple of weeks before the currency was abandoned in favour of the novi dinar, pegged to the Deutsche Mark as it was used parallel with dinar. Novi dinar's peg to DM lasted until 1996 when the National Bank of Yugoslavia moved to floating exchange rate. 10 and 100 dinara notes were characteristic for lack of serial number on them.

1994 Series
| Obverse | Reverse | Value | Size (mm) | Colour | Obverse | Reverse | First printed date | Issued | Withdrawn |
|---|---|---|---|---|---|---|---|---|---|
| | | 10 dinara | 116 × 55 | green and brown | Josif Pančić | Kopaonik mountain | 1994 | 29 December 1993 | 22 July 1994 |
| | | 100 dinara | 135 × 64 | blue and violet | Nikola Tesla | Nikola Tesla Museum | 1994 | 5 January 1994 | 22 July 1994 |
| | | 1000 dinara | 139 × 66 | violet and red | Petar II Petrović Njegoš | Cetinje monastery | 1994 | 29 December 1993 | 22 July 1994 |
| | | 5,000 dinara | 143 × 68 | blue and violet | Dositej Obradović | Hopovo monastery | 1994 | 29 December 1993 | 22 July 1994 |
| | | 50,000 dinara | 147 × 70 | red and violet | Karađorđe | Church and mension of Karađorđe | 1994 | 3 January 1994 | 22 July 1994 |
| | | 500,000 dinara | 139 × 66 | yellow and orange | Jovan Cvijić | Captain Miša's Mansion | 1994 | 11 January 1994 | 22 July 1994 |
| | | 10,000,000 dinara (1993 banknote overprinted with "1994") | 167 × 80 | grey and light green | Ivo Andrić | National Library of Serbia | 1994 | 14 January 1994 | 22 July 1994 |
These images are to scale at 0.7 pixels per millimetre, a standard for world banknotes. Source:

== Novi dinar ==
=== 1994 series ===
On 24 January 1994, notes were introduced for 1, 5, and 10 novih (new) dinara. A second series of notes was introduced later in the year for 5, 10, and 20 novih dinara, with 50 novih dinara note added in 1996 and 100 novih dinara in 1997.

The second novi dinar series replaces the emblem of the National Bank of Yugoslavia with that of the Federal Republic, while the 5, 10, and 20 dinar banknotes feature inscriptions only in Cyrillic on the obverse.

1994 "Novi dinar" Series
| Image | Value | Size (mm) | Predominant colour | Obverse | Reverse | First printed date | Issued | Withdrawn |
|---|---|---|---|---|---|---|---|---|
| | 1 novi dinar | 126 × 60 | brown and green | Josif Pančić | Kopaonik mountain | 1 January 1994 | 24 January 1994 | 1 January 1995 |
| | 5 novih dinara | 131 × 62 | pink | Nikola Tesla | Nikola Tesla Museum | 1 January 1994 | 24 January 1994 | 1 January 1995 |
| | 10 novih dinara | 135 × 64 | violet and blue | Petar II Petrović Njegoš | Cetinje monastery | 1 January 1994 | 24 January 1994 | 1 January 1995 |
1994–1996 Second "Novi dinar" Series
| | 5 novih dinara | 131 × 62 | Purple | Nikola Tesla | Nikola Tesla Museum | 3 March 1994 | 5 December 1994 | 1 January 2002 |
| | 10 novih dinara | 135 × 64 | red and brown | Petar II Petrović Njegoš | Cetinje monastery | 3 March 1994 | 5 December 1994 | 1 January 2002 |
| | 20 novih dinara | 139 × 66 | Orange and green | Đura Jakšić | Vraćevšnica monastery | 3 March 1994 | 3 August 1994 | 1 January 2002 |
| | 50 novih dinara | 143 × 68 | blue | Miloš Obrenović | Prince Miloš's Residence | June 1996 | 31 July 1996 | 1 January 2002 |
| | 100 novih dinara | 147 × 70 | yellow | Dositej Obradović | Hopovo monastery | October 1996 | 9 June 1997 | 1 January 2002 |
Planned "Novi dinar" banknote
| | 200 novih dinara | | green | Stevan Stojanović Mokranjac | a grand piano | April 1999 | Never issued | |
These images are to scale at 0.7 pixels per millimetre, a standard for world banknotes. Source:

=== 2000 series ===
In 2000, new notes without the word "novih" were issued in denominations of 20, 50, and 100 dinara. 10, 200, and 1,000 dinara notes were introduced in 2001, followed by 5,000 dinara in 2002.

Beginning in 2003, banknotes of the (re-established) National Bank of Serbia were introduced. These banknotes use almost the same design as the 2000–2002 Yugoslav notes. The main difference is that the words Narodna Banka Jugoslavije (lit. 'National Bank of Yugoslavia') are changed to Narodna Banka Srbije (lit. 'National Bank of Serbia') and the coat of arms of Serbia and Montenegro is changed to the Serbian coat of arms. Banknotes released by the national bank of Yugoslavia between 2000 and 2002 were withdrawn from circulation on 1 January 2007.

2000–2002 Series
| Image | Value | Dimensions | Colour | Obverse | Reverse | First printed date | Issued | Withdrawn |
|---|---|---|---|---|---|---|---|---|
| | 10 dinara | 131 x 62 | Ochre-yellow | Vuk Karadžić; Filip Višnjić in the background | Figure of Vuk Karadžić; Members of the First Slavic Congress held in Prague in 1848; Vignette of the letters Vuk introduced | 2000 | 31 May 2001 | 1 January 2007 |
| | 20 dinara | 135 x 64 | green | Petar II Petrović Njegoš | statue of Njegoš from the Njegoš's mausoleum Mount Lovćen | 2000 | 15 December 2000 | 1 January 2007 |
| | 50 dinara | 139 x 66 | Purple | Stevan Stojanović Mokranjac; A piano | Figure of Mokranjac; A motif of Miroslav Gospels illumination scores Notes | 2000 | 15 December 2000 | 1 January 2007 |
| | 100 dinara | 143 x 68 | blue | Nikola Tesla; Definition of tesla, a unit of magnetic flux density | Portrait of Nikola Tesla; A detail from the Tesla's AC motor | 2000 | 15 December 2000 | 1 January 2007 |
| | 200 dinara | 147 x 70 | brown | Nadežda Petrović statue of Nadežda Petrović silhouette of the Gračanica Monastery | figure of Nadežda Petrović; Gračanica Monastery | 2001 | 31 May 2001 | 1 January 2007 |
| | 1,000 dinara | 151 x 72 | red | Đorđe Vajfert; An outline of Vajfert's brewery | Portrait of Vajfert; Hologram image of St. George and the Dragon; Details from the interior of the old building of the National Bank of the Kingdom of Serbia | 2001 | 20 September 2001 | 1 January 2007 |
| | 5,000 dinara | 159 x 76 | Purple and green | Slobodan Jovanović; Ornamental detail from the building of the Serbian Academy of Sciences and Arts | Portrait of Slobodan Jovanović; Silhouette of the National Parliament | 2002 | 21 August 2002 | 1 March 2006 |
These images are to scale at 0.7 pixels per millimetre, a standard for world banknotes.

== Sources ==
- Pick, Albert (1994). Bruce, Colin R. II; Shafer, Neil (eds.). Standard Catalog of World Paper Money: General Issues (7th ed.). Krause Publications. ISBN 0-87341-207-9.
- Pick, Albert (1996). Bruce, Colin R. II; Shafer, Neil (eds.). Standard Catalog of World Paper Money: General Issues to 1960 (8th ed.). Krause Publications. ISBN 0-87341-469-1.
- Yugoslavian banknotes at Infotech 2003
- Ron Wise's Banknoteworld: Yugoslavia
