= YUR =

YUR may refer to:

- Genetic code for leucine
- yur, ISO 639-3 code for the Yurok language
- YUR, ISO 4217 code for Yugoslav Reformed dinar in Serbia and Montenegro
