= Kosovo and the euro =

Eurozone participation European Union member states (special territories not shown) 21 in the eurozone 1 in ERM II, with an opt-out (Denmark) 5 not in ERM II, but committed to join the eurozone after meeting the convergence criteria (Czech Republic, Hungary, Poland, Romania, and Sweden) Non–EU member states 4 using the euro with a monetary agreement (Andorra, Monaco, San Marino, and Vatican City) 2 using the euro unilaterally (Kosovo and Montenegro)

Kosovo adopted the euro as its legal tender in 2002 despite the territory not being a member of the Eurozone or the European Union. This succeeded its use of German marks from 1999.

== Background ==
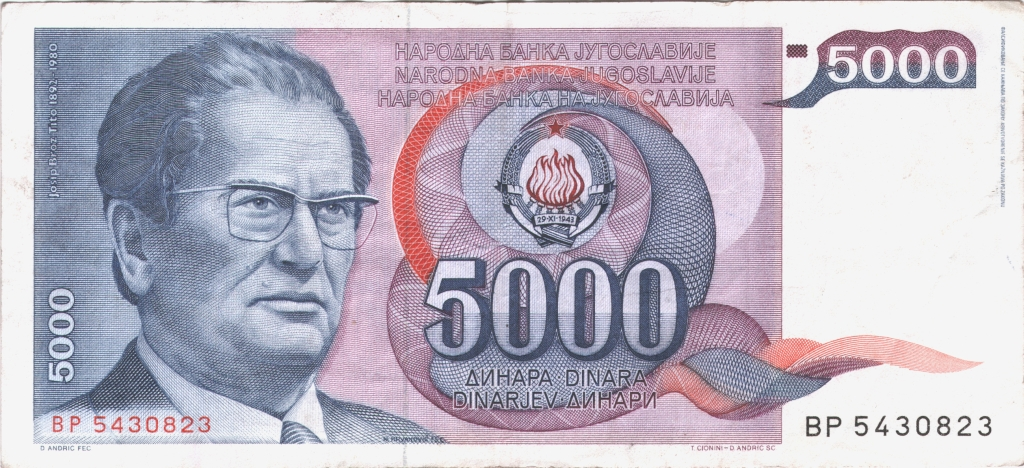
5000 dinar banknote (1985)

During the disintegration of Yugoslavia in the early 1990s, Kosovo unsuccessfully attempted to gain independence, and in 1998–1999 the situation escalated with the Kosovo War.

Kosovo declared independence on 17 February 2008. As of 19 December 2025, 118 out of 193 (61.1%) United Nations member states have formally recognised the Republic of Kosovo. Notably, 22 out of 27 (81%) member states of the European Union and 24 out of 28 (86%) member states of NATO have recognised Kosovo. Serbia, continuing to claim Kosovo as a province of it, refuses to recognise it.

== Monetary situation prior to 1999 ==
Before the establishment of the United Nations Interim Administration Mission in Kosovo (UNMIK), Kosovo was bound to monetary policy of FR Yugoslavia, and used the Yugoslav dinar as its currency. However, wartime inflation and tensions with the Federal Republic of Yugoslavia severely discredited the Yugoslav dinar, and many in Kosovo preferred using and hoarding foreign currencies. At the time, the most frequently used foreign currencies were the Albanian lek and German mark, although the U.S. dollar and Swiss franc were also widely used.

== Introduction of the mark ==
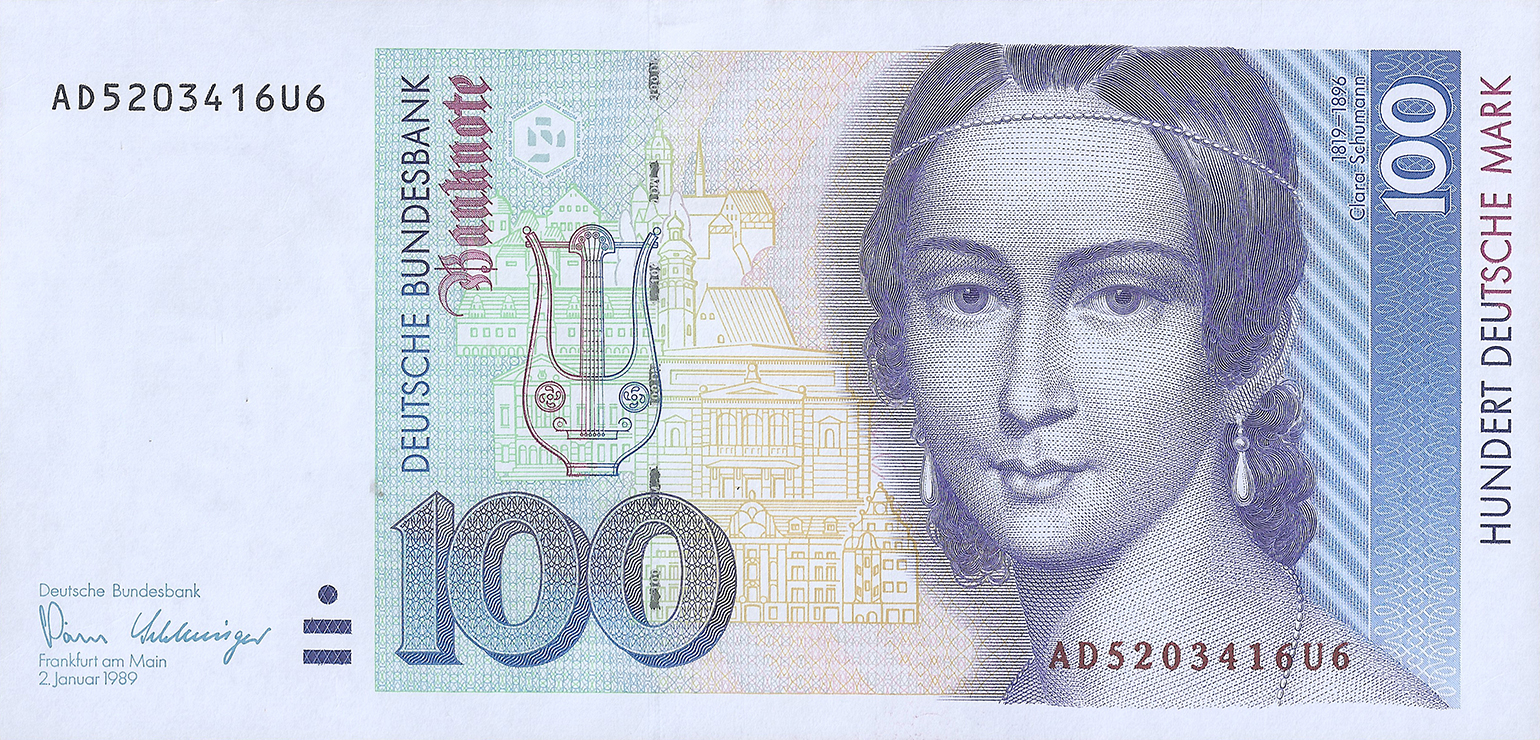
A 100 Mark banknote

In the immediate post-conflict period, foreign currencies—especially the Deutsche Mark—were widely used alongside the Yugoslav dinar in Kosovo. In September 1999, UNMIK recognised the status quo with a regulation accepting the use of other currencies. While the dinar was never officially withdrawn from circulation, its use was “not encouraged”. The use of other currencies, mainly the Albanian lek, also continued. (Note: The Deutsche Bundesbank estimated in September 1999 that the 2 billion Deutsche Marks were held in the former Yugoslavia. This would amount to more than 80 Marks per person.) The Deutsche Bundesbank was not informed in advance, and did not send any additional coins and notes to Kosovo for the unofficial changeover. But since there were no restrictions on the import and export of Deutsche Marks, and many Kosovars working abroad sent money home, it was possible to supply Kosovo with sufficient quantities of Deutsche Marks.

The Yugoslav dinar (and later Serbian dinar) continued to be widely used in Northern Kosovo and Serb enclaves throughout Kosovo.

== Towards the euro ==
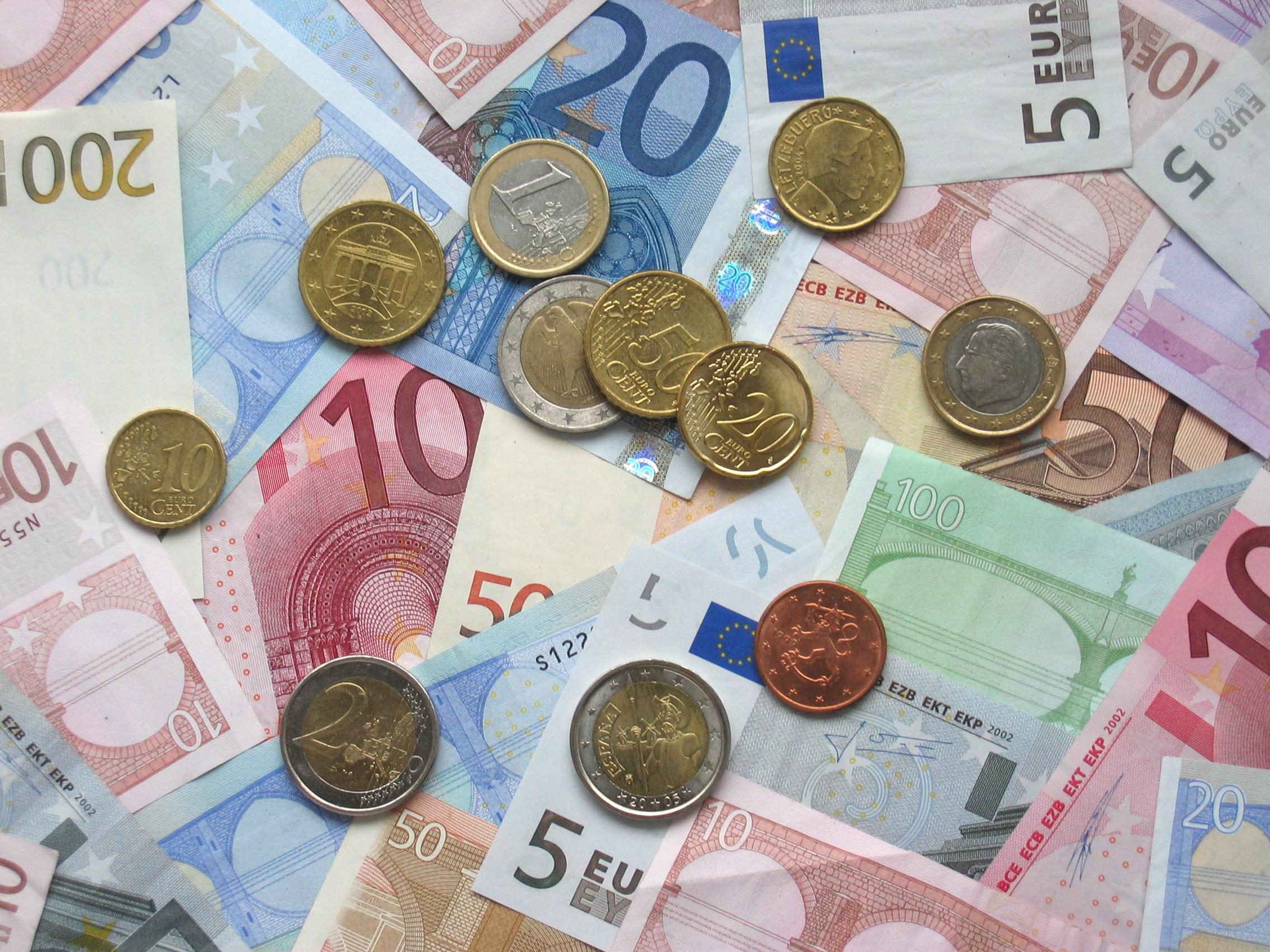
Euro coins and banknotes of various denominations

Like Germany, Kosovo switched to the euro on 1 January 2002. The Deutsche Mark remained legal tender in Kosovo until 1 March 2002.

The change to the euro was achieved in cooperation with the European Central Bank (ECB) and national banks in the Eurozone. By December 2001, about 100 million euro in cash had been frontloaded to the Banking and Payments Authority of Kosovo. Kosovo does not mint any coins of its own.

== EU membership ==
Kosovo is a potential candidate for joining the European Union. The European Commission and the European Central Bank have voiced their discontent over countries unilaterally adopting the euro on several occasions in the past, and it is unclear whether Kosovo would be able to accede to the EU while using the euro. Montenegro, which similarly unilaterally adopted the euro in 2002, had a statement attached to their Stabilisation and Association Agreement with the EU that read: “unilateral introduction of the euro was not compatible with the Treaty.” The issue is expected to be resolved through the accession negotiations process, with the ECB having stated that the implications of unilateral euro adoption “would be spelled out at the latest in the event of possible negotiations on EU accession.” Diplomats have suggested that it is unlikely that countries will be forced to withdraw the euro from circulation.

== See also ==
- Euroization
- Montenegro and the euro
- Accession of Kosovo to the European Union
- Accession of Serbia to the European Union

== Bibliography ==
- Bogetic, Zeljko (2000). Official Dollarization: Current Experiences and Issues. Cato Journal, Vol.20, No.2 (Fall 2000).
- "Euro: A Force for Stability in Kosovo". balkaninsight.com. 26 February 2010.
- NRC Handelsblad (1999). Kosovo krijgt douane en Duitse mark, 4 September 1999.
- Starr, Martha (2004). Monetary policy in post-conflict countries: Restoring credibility. American University, May 2004.
- Svetchine, Michel (2005). Kosovo Experience with Euroization of its Economy. Central Bank of Albania.
- Schön, Gerhard (2008). Euro Münzkatalog.
