= Hyperinflation in Yugoslavia =

Hyperinflation in Yugoslavia may refer to:

- Hyperinflation in the Socialist Federal Republic of Yugoslavia, late 1980s and early 1990s up to the breakup
- Hyperinflation in the Federal Republic of Yugoslavia, 1992 to 1994
