= National Bank of Yugoslavia in Serbia and Montenegro =

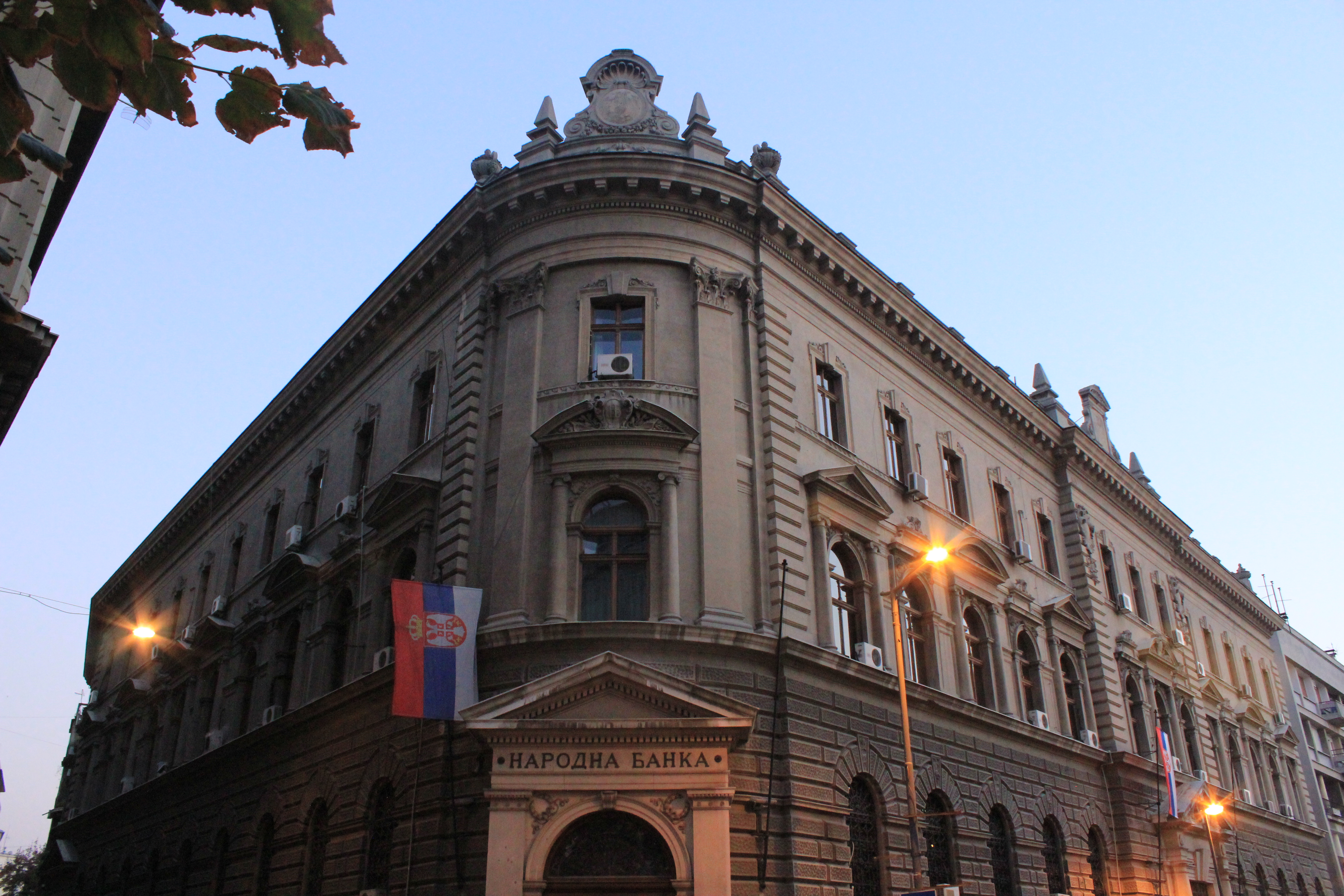
National Bank Building, Belgrade, former seat of the National Bank

The National Bank of Yugoslavia (Serbian: Narodna banka Jugoslavije, NBJ) was the central bank of the Federal Republic of Yugoslavia, the country formed by the former Yugoslav republics of Serbia and Montenegro.

The National Bank of Yugoslavia operated in former Yugoslavia until the breakup of Yugoslavia in 1991. It continued to operate in Belgrade under the same name. On 4 February 2003, it was renamed the National Bank of Serbia, as Montenegro left the state union.

== History ==
The 1992 Constitution of the Federal Republic of Yugoslavia named the National Bank of Yugoslavia an "institution of the monetary system of the Federal Republic of Yugoslavia". In 1993, a Law on the National Bank of Yugoslavia (Serbian: Zakon o Narodnoj banci Jugoslavije) was passed by the National Assembly of the Federal Republic of Yugoslavia.

In late 1992, all four breakaway republics of Yugoslavia became members of the International Monetary Fund, as also did rump Yugoslavia of Serbia and Montenegro (which would also eventually rename itself that way in 2003). In 1993, the respective National Banks of Kosovo, Montenegro, Serbia, and Vojvodina were merged back into the NBJ (in the Federal Republic of Yugoslavia).

The period of the Yugoslav Wars was marked by hyperinflation in the Federal Republic of Yugoslavia, which led to the Yugoslav dinar in Serbia and Montenegro to be re-denominated three times in a span of a few years.

In 1999, Montenegro introduced the dual use of the Deutsche Mark, reportedly driven by an unstable, expansionary monetary policy stance of the National Bank of Yugoslavia.

In November 1999, the United Nations Interim Administration Mission in Kosovo established the Banking and Payments Authority of Kosovo in Pristina, which in 2010 became the Central Bank of Kosovo. UNMIK allowed Kosovo to also use the Deutsche Mark. In March 2001, the Central Bank of Montenegro was established following legislation passed the previous year, even though it no longer had an independent monetary policy role following Montenegro's unilateral adoption of the Deutsche Mark as sole legal tender from 1 January 2001. In February 2003, the National Bank of Yugoslavia, which no longer had monetary authority over either Kosovo or Montenegro, was renamed the National Bank of Serbia.

== Governors ==
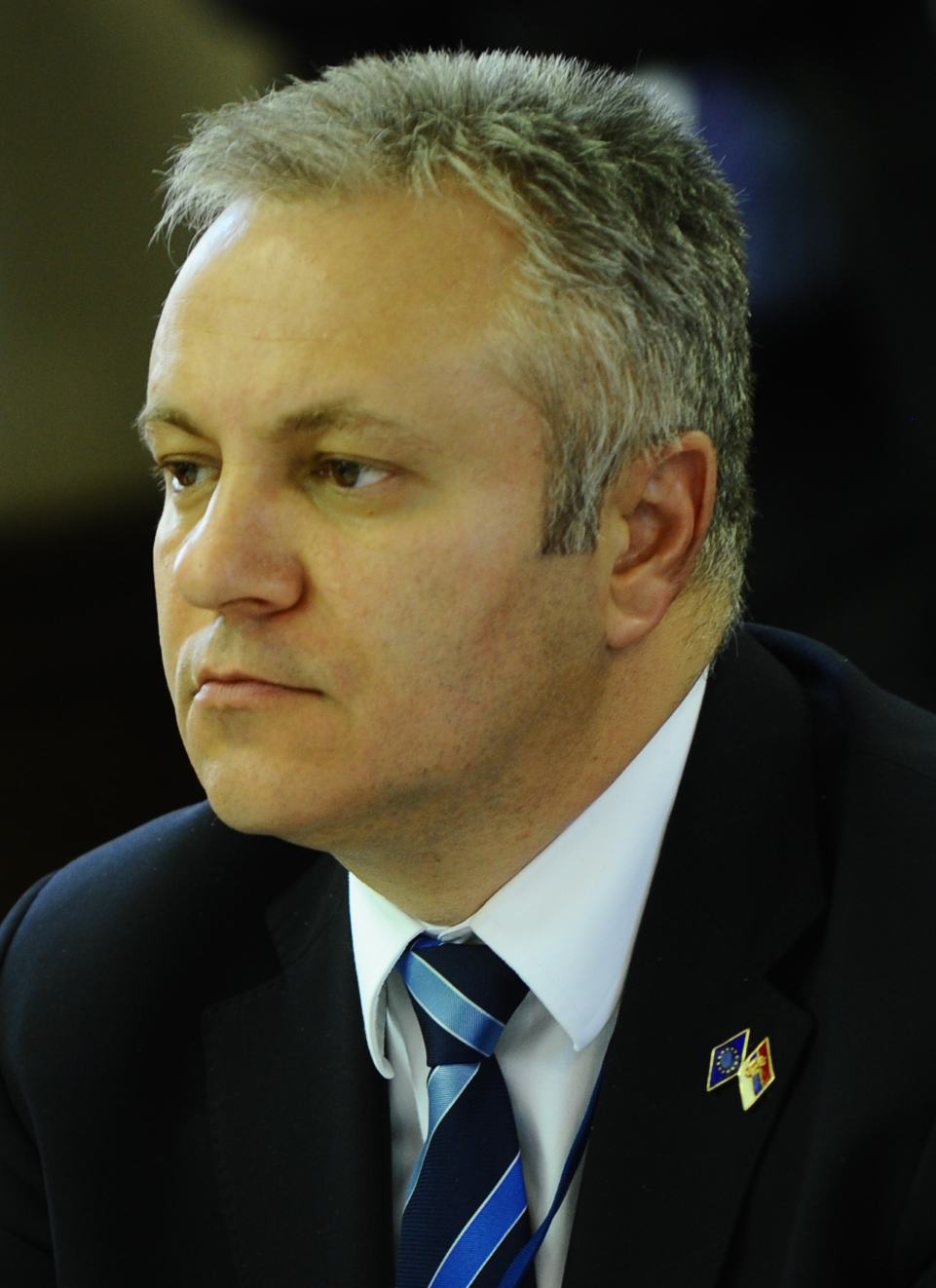
Mlađan Dinkić, last governor of the National Bank of Yugoslavia and first governor of that of Serbia

- Vuk Ognjanović (July 1992 – July 1993)
- Borisav Atanacković (July – October 1993)
- Dragoslav Avramović (March 1994 – May 1996)
- Dušan Vlatković (July 1997 – November 2000)
- Mlađan Dinkić (November 2000 – February 2003)

== See also ==
- Yugoslav dinar in Serbia and Montenegro
- Banknotes of the Yugoslav dinar in Serbia and Montenegro
- List of central banks
