= Dragoslav Avramović =

Serbian economist and politician (1919–2001)

Dragoslav Avramović (Serbian Cyrillic: Драгослав Аврамовић; 14 October 1919 – 26 February 2001) was a Serbian economist and the governor of the National Bank of Yugoslavia in Serbia and Montenegro.

== Biography ==
Born in 1919 in Skopje where he finished high school in 1937. He graduated in 1941 in Belgrade Faculty of Law and obtained a PhD in 1956. He worked in the National Bank of Yugoslavia from 1951 to 1953. Avramović continued his career in the World Bank where he stayed until 1977 and held a number of important positions. From 1980 to 1984, he held the position of the adviser to the secretary general of UN Conference for Trade and Development (UNCTAD). His last professional position (from 1984 to 1988) was that of an economic adviser in the Bank for Trade and Development in Washington.

He became widely known when in January 1994 his economic program stopped the hyperinflation in the Federal Republic of Yugoslavia and the Yugoslav dinar got into 1:1 parity with the Deutsche Mark. From 2 March 1994 to 15 May 1996, he was the governor of the National Bank of Yugoslavia and the main coordinator of the national economic, social and financial program from 1995 to 1997. All of this brought him huge popularity and according to opinion polls he was the second most popular public figure in Serbia at the time. He resigned in the wake of massive demonstrations against the regime of Slobodan Milošević. In the late 1990s, he was one of the leaders of the opposition alliance Savez za promene.

Avramović became a corresponding member of the Serbian Academy of Arts and Sciences in 1994.

He died in Rockville, Maryland in 2001 and was soon afterwards buried in Belgrade.

Government offices
Preceded by Borisav Atanacković	Governor of the National Bank of Yugoslavia in Serbia and Montenegro; 1994–1996	Succeeded by Dušan Vlatković
