= Montenegro and the euro =

Eurozone participation European Union member states (special territories not shown) 21 in the eurozone 1 in ERM II, with an opt-out (Denmark) 5 not in ERM II, but committed to join the eurozone after meeting the convergence criteria (Czech Republic, Hungary, Poland, Romania, and Sweden) Non–EU member states 4 using the euro with a monetary agreement (Andorra, Monaco, San Marino, and Vatican City) 2 using the euro unilaterally (Kosovo and Montenegro)

Montenegro is a country in Southeast Europe that is neither a member of the European Union (EU) nor of the Eurozone, nor does it have a formal monetary agreement with the EU. However, it is one of the two territories (along with Kosovo) that has unilaterally adopted the euro (Note: Unilateral euroization (or dollarization) is a process in which a state gives up on having its own currency and the EUR (or the USD) becomes the legal currency on its territory. So far, only a few countries in the world have decided to choose such a currency regime.) in 2002 as its de facto domestic currency and legal tender.

== History ==
In the early 20th century, during the short-lived Kingdom of Montenegro, the government introduced the Montenegrin perper from 1906 to 1918. However, other foreign currencies were used in parallel, such as the Austrian krone. From 1922 to 1941, as part of the Kingdom of Serbs, Croats, and Slovenes, later known as the Kingdom of Yugoslavia, Montenegro used the country’s official currency, the Yugoslav dinar.

=== Yugoslav dinar ===
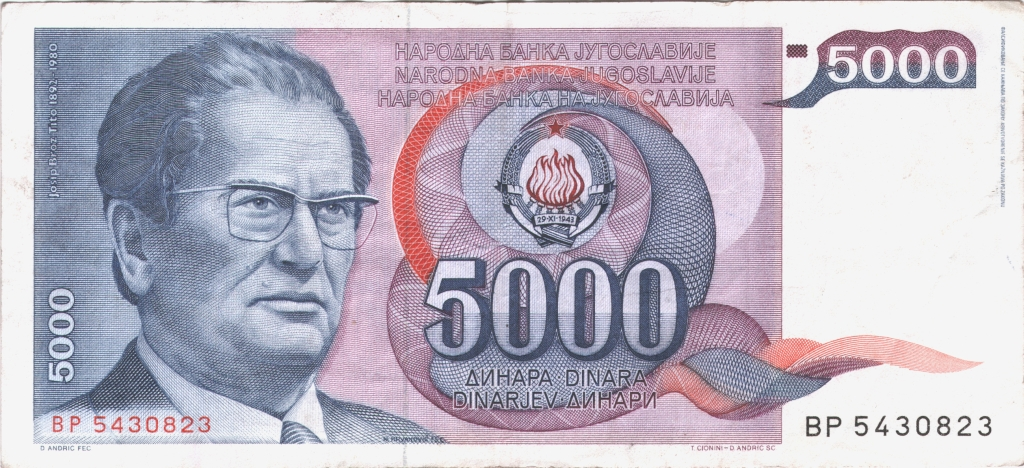
5000 dinar banknote (1985)

After Montenegro became a part of the Socialist Federal Republic of Yugoslavia following World War II, it was bound to Yugoslav monetary policy and used the Yugoslav dinar as its official currency. After Yugoslavia broke up, it continued to use the Yugoslav dinar in Serbia and Montenegro until 1999. After the disintegration of the SFRY, in 1992 the former member republics Montenegro and Serbia formed the Federal Republic of Yugoslavia. In the new country, the monetary system was re-centralized,; thus the National Bank of Montenegro lost its autonomy and became a regional office of the National Bank of Yugoslavia headquartered in Belgrade.

Financial matters were strictly centralized, but this was easy to manipulate, and there were many abuses due to the lack of any legal state and financial discipline; this resulted in hyperinflation in the period 1992–1994. After the crash of the common market and simultaneous outbreaks of war in two former Yugoslav republics, the monthly inflation rate in Serbia and Montenegro was 50% in February 1992, reaching 100% in June the same year. This caused severe and prolonged hyperinflation, one of the worst and longest in history, which led to a devastation of the region. The Yugoslav dinar has been considered one of the worst-performing currencies of the world.

=== Deutsche Mark ===
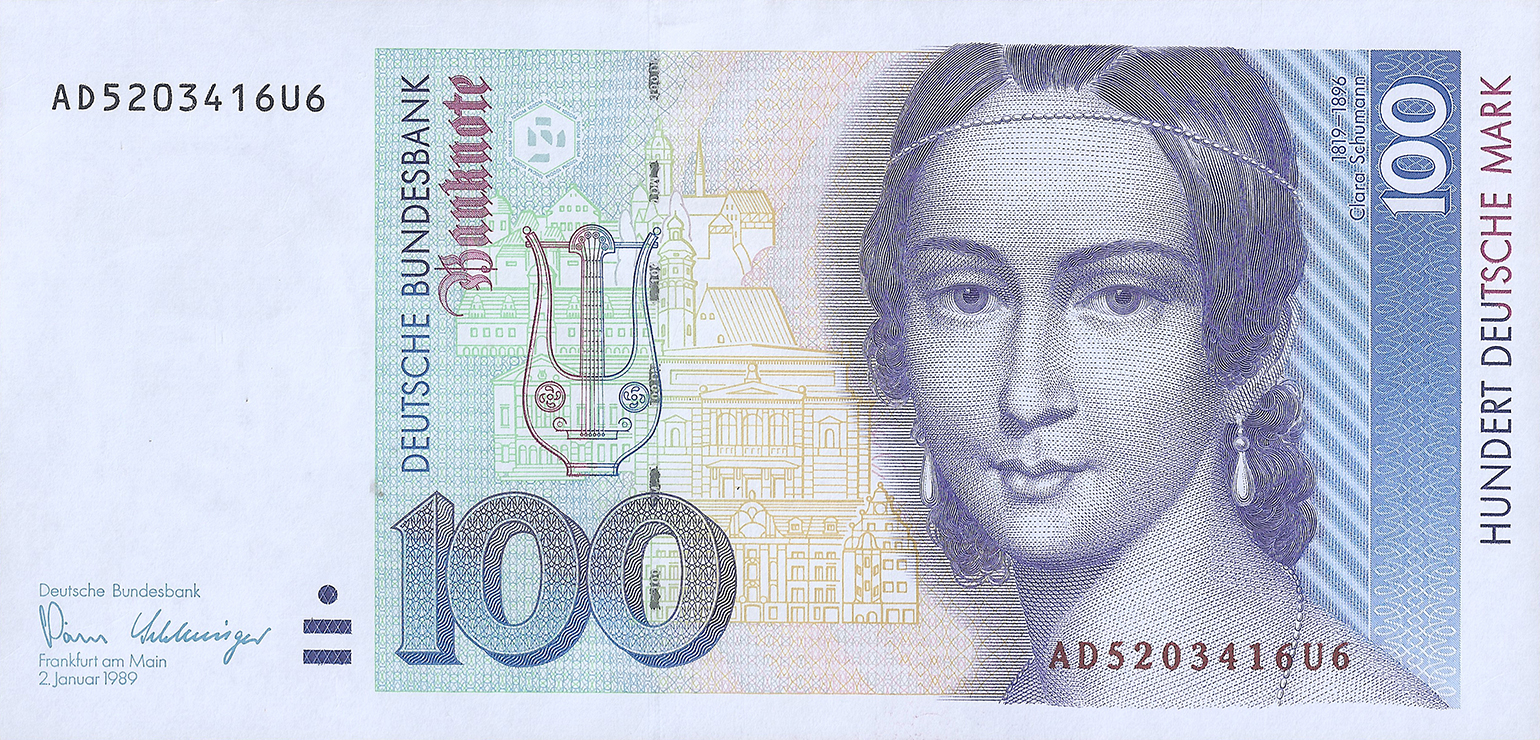
A 100 Mark banknote

At the beginning of 1999, the government started looking for a way to protect the economic interests of Montenegro and its monetary independence. The government established a dual currency system, in which both the dinar and Deutsche Mark would be used. This decision was mainly driven by an unstable, expansionary monetary policy stance of the National Bank of Yugoslavia in Serbia and Montenegro.

The introduction of dollarization, as well as the improvement of the situation in the monetary, financial and banking sectors of Montenegro, resulted in increasing citizensʼ confidence in the new monetary regime. Since January 2001 the country decided to take the Deutsche Mark as a sole legal tender, because a sufficient amount of Deutsche Mark were in circulation, and for this reason there was no need to use the Dinar as the national currency.

=== Euro ===
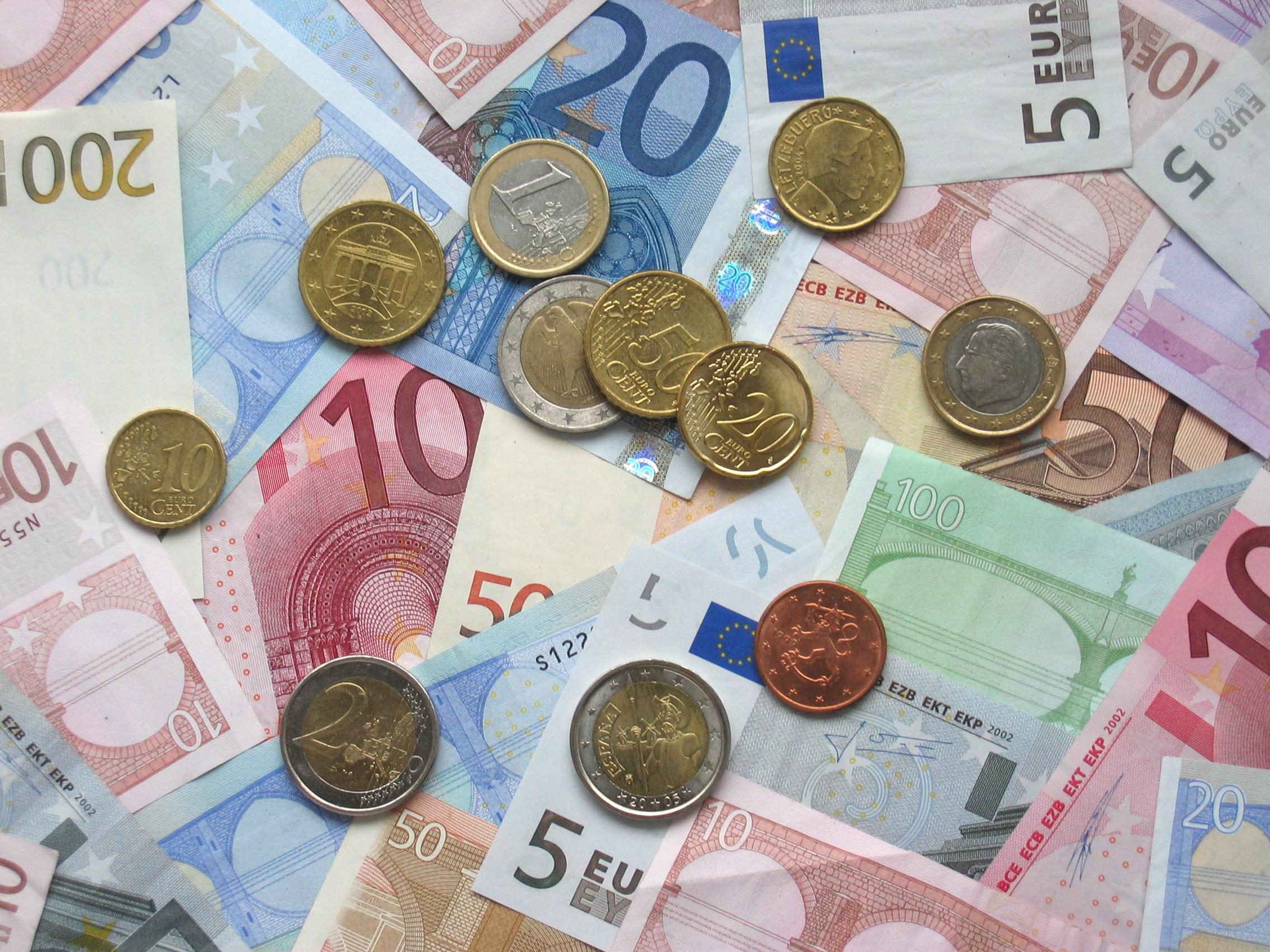
Euro coins and banknotes of various denominations

On 1 January 2002, euro notes and coins were officially introduced into circulation in many European countries, including Germany, where the Deutsche Mark had been the official currency. Thus the Deutsche Mark ceased to be legal tender immediately upon the adoption of the euro. Following these events at the beginning of 2002, Montenegro decided to officially and unilaterally adopt the euro, first as a parallel legal tender to the Deutsche Mark, and from March 2002 as the only legal tender. The main motives were the same as before – to ensure monetary stability and to continue to avoid the high/hyperinflation seen in preceding decades. In November 2018, the Central Bank of Montenegro, the European Central Bank, and the European Commission concluded a cooperation agreement with regard to protection of the euro against counterfeiting.

== Coins ==
Unlike the members of the Eurozone, Montenegro has no authority to mint euro coins of its own and therefore does not have its own national side of the coins in use. Rather, they depend on bills and coins already in circulation.

Eurozone countries have a common reverse, portraying a map of Europe, but have their own design on the obverse, which means that each coin has a variety of different designs in circulation at once. Four European microstates (Andorra, Monaco, San Marino, and Vatican City) (Note: Andorra, Monaco, San Marino, and Vatican City have formal agreements with the EU to use the euro as their official currency and issue their own coins.) which use the euro as their currency also have the right to mint coins with their own designs on the obverse side.

== EU position ==
When Montenegro started using the euro as a national currency, the European Central Bank (ECB) initially did not object to this step. Since then, however, the European Commission and the ECB have expressed dissatisfaction with Montenegro’s unilateral use of the euro, with European Commission spokesperson Amelia Torres saying in 2007 that "The conditions for the adoption of the euro are clear. That means, first and foremost, to be a member of the EU." Also in the Declaration attached to the Stabilisation and Association Agreement with the EU is written that "unilateral introduction of the euro is not compatible with the Treaty." Despite Montenegro becoming a candidate in 2010, the European Union continued to question Montenegro’s use of the euro. The use was eventually acknowledged by the European Commission through a specific approach, which took into consideration that euroisation happened due to "exceptional circumstances" present in the country when the euro was introduced. As a result of that, Montenegro still continues to use the euro currency as its legal tender.

== Montenegrin position ==
Central Bank of Montenegro officials have indicated on several occasions that the European institutions expect Montenegro to adhere very strictly to ERM rules, as a part of the accession procedures to the European Union. In 2009 Nikola Fabris, chief economist of the Central Bank of Montenegro, noted that the situation was different when the euro was adopted by Montenegro, and that other states that have considered unilaterally adopting the euro, such as Bosnia and Herzegovina, would face sanctions from the EU including suspending their accession process.

The dispute regarding the use of the euro was expected to be resolved by analysts during the accession negotiations. Diplomats have indicated it is unlikely Montenegro will be forced to stop the circulation of the euro. In 2013 Radoje Zugi, the finance minister of Montenegro, stated that "it would be economically irrational to return to a currency of your own, only to be back in the euro later". Instead, he hopes that Montenegro will be allowed to keep the euro, and he promised "the government of Montenegro will meet some important conditions to keep the euro, such as fiscal compliance". Similarly, in 2025, President Jakov Milatović described adopting a different interim currency before formally entering the Eurozone as "out of question".

== Current status ==
In 2007 Montenegro signed a Stabilization and Association Agreement with the European Union, then submitted its application for membership in December 2008 and finally obtained the status of official candidate in 2010. In 2012, Montenegro became the first country from the current six Western Balkan states to start accession negotiations with the EU and to date, according to many officials, it is a frontrunner on the path towards the EU membership.

As a part of the ongoing negotiations, the EU will have to deal with this unprecedented case in which a state, already using the common currency without implementing all the mandatory economic conditions, is striving to join the EU and the Eurozone. These conditions (convergence criteria) are set out in Article 140 (1) of the Treaty on the Functioning of the European Union to ensure that a certain country is ready for integration into the monetary regime of the euro area. There are four economic convergence criteria:

1. Price stability: The inflation rate cannot be higher than 1.5 percentage points above the rate of the 3 best-performing member states.
2. Sound and sustainable public finances: Government deficit cannot be higher than 3% of GDP. Government debt cannot be higher than 60% of GDP.
3. Exchange-rate stability: The candidate has to participate in the exchange rate mechanism (ERM II) for at least two years without strong deviations from the ERM II central rate and without devaluing its currency's bilateral central rate against the euro in the same period.
4. Long-term interest rates: The long-term interest rate should not be higher than two percentage points above the rate of the three best-performing member states in terms of price stability.

Additionally to that, to join the euro area candidates must also ensure that their national laws and rules provide for the independence of their national central banks, and that their statutes are in compliance with the provisions of the treaties and compatible with the statutes of the European Central Bank and the European System of Central Banks.

The Maastricht Treaty provides that all members of the European Union will eventually join the euro area, once the convergence criteria have been met. Because Montenegro does not use its own currency, the exchange rate criterion cannot be used to measure if there are severe tensions posing risks to macroeconomic and financial stability, and the long-term interest rate criterion is of more limited usefulness, for which reason alternative convergence criteria that measure these risks have been proposed by the EU, including the balance of payments, price and cost competitiveness and household and corporate indebtedness.

To date, the path of Montenegro to the European Union and subsequently to the Eurozone membership is still unclear. Some experts believe that in a situation like this, the convergence criteria should be set as an additional prerequisite for Montenegro’s membership in the European Union and should be complied with before the country joins the Union. An alternative scenario would involve recognizing Montenegro's unilateral use of the euro in the EU accession treaty, allowing it to continue using the euro after joining the EU while officially remaining outside the euro area. Full membership in the euro area, including participation in the Eurosystem, would be approved only at a later date, when Montenegro fulfills the convergence criteria. The latter scenario has been developed and proposed by the EU, and has been formally accepted by Montenegro, and a draft of the solution with alternative convergence criteria is included in the EU common position for the provisional closure of the accession chapter on economic and monetary policy, which is to be annexed to the accession treaty.

== See also ==
- Euroization
- International status and usage of the euro
- Kosovo and the euro
- Accession of Montenegro to the European Union
