= Poland and the euro =

Eurozone participation European Union member states (special territories not shown) 21 in the eurozone 1 in ERM II, with an opt-out (Denmark) 5 not in ERM II, but committed to join the eurozone after meeting the convergence criteria (Czech Republic, Hungary, Poland, Romania, and Sweden) Non–EU member states 4 using the euro with a monetary agreement (Andorra, Monaco, San Marino, and Vatican City) 2 using the euro unilaterally (Kosovo and Montenegro)

Poland does not use the euro as its currency. However, under the terms of their Treaty of Accession with the European Union, all new Member States "shall participate in the Economic and Monetary Union from the date of accession as a Member State with a derogation", which means that Poland is obliged to eventually replace its currency, the złoty, with the euro.

There is no target date for Polish euro adoption, and no fixed date for when the country will join ERM-II (the fifth euro convergence criterion).

Euro adoption will require the approval of at least two-thirds of the Sejm to make a constitutional amendment changing the official currency from the złoty to the euro. The Law and Justice (PiS) party, Poland's largest political party, opposes euro adoption. Prime Minister Donald Tusk has said that he may agree to a referendum on euro participation in order to gain their support for a constitutional amendment. On the other hand, in 2024, Tusk’s finance minister Domański said that adopting the euro is currently not justified and that the złoty helped Poland avoid recession during the 2008 financial crisis and to weather other shocks.

== Political preparations for euro adoption ==
=== Prior to 2004 ===
Plans to join the eurozone began back in 2003 before the accession to the EU, when the contemporary premier Leszek Miller stated that Poland would join the eurozone between 2007 and 2009. One of the leaders of Civic Platform party (PO), Jan Rokita, was certain that the best way to converge to euro was through a unilateral euroization. Nevertheless, euroization is against the rules of the EU and it cannot be adopted by any Member State without the approval of the Union. Lastly, the plan was not finalized and Poland suspended it.

=== 2005–2007 ===
During the rule of the Law and Justice, Self-Defence of the Republic of Poland and League of Polish Families coalition, the euro was not a priority on Poland's agenda. In 2006, prime minister Kazimierz Marcinkiewicz stated that the accession to euro area was only possible after 2009, as the Polish deficit could decrease to 3% of GDP by the end of 2007. The negotiations about Poland joining the eurozone were postponed. The then-prime minister, Jarosław Kaczyński, held an even more skeptical position. In his opinion, the euro was disadvantageous for Poland, as it would cause an increase in prices and the złoty would lose stability.

=== 2008–2012 ===
The euro adoption process in Poland is regulated by the Strategic Framework for National Euro Changeover Plan (adopted by the Council of Ministers in 2010) and the National Euro Changeover Plan (approved in 2011 by the Committee for European Affairs). The plan comprises an economic impact assessment of the euro adoption, followed by a chapter on the measures needed to ensure Polish compliance with the "Maastricht convergence criteria", and finally a roadmap for the euro changeover process.

On 10 September 2008, speaking at the launch of an economic forum in a Polish resort of Krynica-Zdrój, Polish Prime Minister Donald Tusk announced the ruling government's objective to join the Eurozone in 2012, which was confirmed by the government on 28 October 2008. However, Poland's then President Lech Kaczynski wanted euro adoption put to a referendum. Finance Minister Dominik Radziwill said on 10 July 2009 that Poland could meet the fiscal criteria by 2012 and enter the Eurozone in 2014. On 5 November 2009, speaking at the news conference, Polish Deputy Finance Minister Ludwik Kotecki said the government may announce a national strategy for euro adoption in mid-2010. In an interview for Rzeczpospolita dated 22 October 2009, he also said Poland could adopt the euro in 2014 if the general government deficit is reduced in 2012. Former President Lech Kaczyński said at a news conference that Poland was unable to join Eurozone before 2015, and even that date was still very optimistic. Also, Polish government officials had confirmed that Poland would not join Eurozone in 2012. On Friday, 11 December 2009, Polish Prime Minister Donald Tusk said Poland could join the eurozone in 2015. Speaking during Finance Ministry-organized seminar on the euro-adoption process on 15 December 2009, Deputy Minister of Finance Ludwik Kotecki said the year 2015 is more likely than 2014, however he declined to specify the official target date.

In the years following the Great Recession, economic statistics showed that the devaluation of its floating currency the złoty led Polish products to become more competitively priced to foreign buyers, and because of that, Poland had a higher economic GDP growth in subsequent years than if the country had been a part of the eurozone. The Polish government advocated in 2012 that it would only be wise for Poland to join the eurozone once the euro crisis had ended, based on the argument that delaying their accession would minimise the risk for Poland to become one of the net financial creditors to other eurozone countries in financial difficulties.

In December 2011, Polish foreign minister Radosław Sikorski said that Poland aimed to adopt the euro on 1 January 2016, but only if "the eurozone is reformed by then, and the entrance is beneficial to us." The Polish government planned to comply with all the Euro convergence criteria by 2015. In autumn 2012, the Monetary Policy Council of the Polish National Bank published its official monetary guidelines for 2013, confirming earlier political statements that Poland should only join the ERM-II once the existing eurozone countries have overcome the current sovereign-debt crisis, to maximise the benefits of monetary integration and minimise associated costs. The governor of the National Bank, Marek Belka, has stated that the euro will not be adopted before the end of his term in 2016.

In late 2012, Tusk announced that he planned to launch a "national debate" on euro adoption the following spring, and in December 2012, Polish Finance Minister Jacek Rostowski said that his country should strive to adopt the euro as soon as possible. On 21 December 2012, it was announced by the Ministry of Finance that they planned to update the country's National Euro Changeover Plan in 2013, mainly due to the recent institutional changes in the eurozone which require additional considerations. One of the key details investigated as part of the work to update the plan is whether or not an amendment to Article 227 of the Constitution of the Republic of Poland will need to be passed to change the currency from the Złoty to the euro and to enact changes to the central bank.

Despite the Polish government under Prime Minister Donald Tusk having favoured euro adoption in 2012, it however did not have the required two-thirds majority in the Sejm to amend the constitution to make it legally compatible with euro adoption, due to the opposition of the Law and Justice party to the euro. The Polish Finance Minister emphasised that the government's support for euro adoption remained unchanged as a strategic goal, and would not be changed in the updated plan. At the same time, the European debt crisis gave the government reason to wait for increased stability in the euro.

=== 2013–2023 ===
In January 2013, Polish President Bronislaw Komorowski stated that a decision on euro adoption should not be made until after parliamentary and presidential elections scheduled for 2015, but that in the meantime the country should try to comply with the convergence criteria. In February 2013, Jaroslaw Kaczynski, leader of the Law and Justice party stated that "I do not foresee any moment when the adoption of the euro would be advantageous for us" and called for a referendum on euro adoption. Rostowski has stated that Poland will not set a target date for the switch since the country first needs to carry out reforms to prepare itself. In March 2013, Tusk said for the first time that he would be open to considering a referendum on euro participation – decided by simple majority – provided that it was part of a package in which the parliament first approved the necessary constitutional amendment to adopt the euro subject to approval in a referendum. In April 2013 Marek Belka, head of National Bank of Poland, said that Poland should demand to be permitted to adopt the euro without first joining the ERM-II due to concerns over currency speculation. Following the 2014 Russian military intervention in Ukraine, Belka said that Poland needed to reevaluate its reluctance to join the eurozone. In June 2014, a joint statement by the finance minister, central bank chief and president of Poland stated that Poland should begin a debate shortly after the 2015 parliamentary elections about when to adopt the euro, leading to a roadmap decision that might even include identification of a target date.

In October 2014, the Deputy Prime Minister Janusz Piechociński suggested that Poland should join the Eurozone in 2020 at the earliest. The newly elect Prime Minister, Ewa Kopacz, having replaced Donald Tusk for the final year of the government's term, at the same time commented: "Before answering the question which target date should be set for the euro changeover, we must ask another: What is the situation of the eurozone and where are they going? If the eurozone will strengthen, then Poland should fulfill all the criteria for inclusion, which would in any case be good for the economy." The PM hereby referred to the earlier political decision of first letting the National Coordination Committee for Euro Changeover complete its update of the changeover plan, which await a prior establishment of the banking union, before setting a target date for euro adoption. (Note: Cite from the 2014 Polish convergence report: Due to the significant reform agenda in the European Union and in the euro area, the current objective is to update the National Euro Changeover Plan with reference to the impact of those changes on Poland’s euro adoption strategy. The date of completion of the document is conditional on the adoption of binding solutions on the EU forum concerning the key institutional changes, in particular, those referring to the banking union. The outcome of these changes determines the area of the necessary institutional and legal adjustments as well as the national balance of costs and benefits arising from introduction of the common currency.) More recently, Krzysztof Szczerski, the foreign affairs advisor to Poland's new President Andrzej Duda, said in July 2015 that "Poles should decide in a referendum whether they want to embrace the euro".

In the 2015 Polish parliamentary election, the winning party was the eurosceptic Law and Justice party, which opposes euro adoption. On 13 April 2019 at a convention, Jarosław Kaczyński, the leader of Law and Justice party stated: "We will adopt the euro someday, because we are committed to do so and we are and will be in the European Union, but we will accept it when it is in our interest". He came forth with a declaration, according to which the euro would not be introduced until Poland's economy catches up with Western European economies. In his view Poland should accept the euro only when the national economy will reach 85% of GDP per capita of Germany. Later on, Jarosław Kaczyński and premier Mateusz Morawiecki maintain that convergence to euro at this point would be harmful for Poland.

=== 2024–present ===
In April 2024, the Finance Minister in the Tusk government, Andrzej Domański stated that Poland is still not ready to adopt the euro, and added that having the zloty helped Poland avoid a recession in the aftermath of the 2008 financial crisis. This statement shows that the change of government, after the defeat of the PiS in the 2023 elections, did not modify the stance of Poland on the adoption of the euro. In January 2026, Domański reiterated his opposition to Poland joining the Eurozone in the short to medium term, arguing that Poland's strong economic performances showed that growth did not require the adoption of the euro.

== The process for the introduction of the euro ==
While Donald Tusk held the post of the prime minister in Poland, first steps have been taken towards the creation of a interinstitutional organizational structure for euro adoption. On 13 January 2009, the Government Plenipotentiary for Euro Adoption in the Republic of Poland was established, with Ludwik Kotecki being chosen for the role.

Subsequently, on 3 November 2009 new institutions were created: a National Coordination Committee for Euro Changeover, a Coordinating Council, Interinstitutional Working Committees for Preparation for the Introduction of the Euro by the Republic of Poland, and Task Groups.

The position of the Government Plenipotentiary for Euro Adoption in Poland was abolished on 28 December 2015 by Prime Minister Beata Szydło.

== Expected effects of the euro convergence ==
The adoption of the euro in Poland has been the subject of economic analysis by Polish finance experts. In 2017, the Robert Schuman Foundation and Konrad Adenauer Foundation in Poland prepared a report of three possible scenarios as a result of Poland acceding to the euro area. According to the report, delaying introduction of the euro would be a net negative for Poland. Other research has included government reports drawn up by the Ministry of Finance in Poland in 2005 and two reports by the National Bank of Poland (NBP) in 2004 and 2009. The NBP report from 2009 concluded that in the long-term, Poland's GDP would expand by an extra 7.5% if it became a member of the eurozone, with most of that benefit coming in the first 10 years after joining. In a 2014 analysis, the NBP stated that in the wake of the eurozone crisis, "The chance of accelerating economic growth in Poland as a result of adopting the euro depends on whether the institutions of the euro area and the potential of the Polish economy are strengthened."

Expected positive effects include:

- direct benefits
  - reduction of exchange rate risk and costs of transactions – 80% of Polish trade is settled in the euro. Due to exchange rate risk many entrepreneurs uncertain of the profits and transaction costs do not engage in international operations;
    - lower business costs;
    - improved quality in the estimation of profitability of investment projects;
    - better transparency and comparability of prices in the international perspective;
    - improved position of Poland as a trading partner;
    - Easier attraction of international/eurozone talent to fill job roles
  - enhanced macroeconomic stability;
    - limited risk of speculation of the currency;
    - lower risk of a currency crisis;
    - increase in the credibility of monetary policy;
    - improvement in credit ranking;
  - decline in interest rates;
    - a decrease in the cost of raising capital for households, enterprises and public institutions;
    - simpler credit availability and related to it increase in consumption;
    - improvement of service interest;
- growth of trade
- increase investments – both in domestic investments and foreign direct investments (FDI)
- financial integration;
- growth of GDP and welfare.

The reports note that part of the possible positive effects is contingent on an execution of changes, such as a reform of public finance or reduction of public debt.

On the other side, the team of NBP analysts lists possible negative effects of the convergence to the euro:

- long-term costs
  - loss of monetary policy independence – transfer to the EU level;
  - loss of the possibility of using the exchange rate as a tool of adjustment policy;
- medium-term risks
  - nonoptimal conversion rate;
  - risk of deterioration of competitiveness;
  - inflation differential within the monetary union;
  - asset price inflation;
- Short-term risks and costs
  - risks associated with convergence criteria – inter alia with an accession to the ESM II and a risk of the Mundell's trilemma;
  - short-term price effects and the associated negative consequences of the euro illusion;
  - price effects regarding the introduction of the euro into cash circulation;
    - euro coins and banknotes supplies – as the euro is already available in cash, the cost of conversion would be lower;
    - adaptation of IT systems;
    - preparation and implementation of a nationwide information campaign on the euro.

== Public opinion ==
=== Eurobarometer ===
Public support for the euro in Poland by each Eurobarometer survey

The following are polls on the question of whether Poland should abolish the złoty and adopt the euro.

| Date (survey taken) | Date (survey published) | Yes | No | Undecided / Don't know | Conducted by |
|---|---|---|---|---|---|
| March 2026 | June 2026 | 43% | 56% | 1% | Eurobarometer |
| March 2025 | June 2025 | 46% | 52% | 2% | Eurobarometer |
| May 2024 | June 2024 | 47% | 52% | 2% | Eurobarometer |
| April 2023 | June 2023 | 55% | 44% | 2% | Eurobarometer |
| April 2022 | June 2022 | 60% | 38% | 3% | Eurobarometer |
| May 2021 | July 2021 | 56% | 41% | 3% | Eurobarometer |
| June 2020 | July 2020 | 48% | 49% | 3% | Eurobarometer |
| April 2019 | June 2019 | 46% | 51% | 3% | Eurobarometer |
| April 2018 | May 2018 | 48% | 50% | 2% | Eurobarometer |
| April 2017 | May 2017 | 43% | 55% | 2% | Eurobarometer |
| April 2016 | May 2016 | 41% | 56% | 3% | Eurobarometer |
| April 2015 | May 2015 | 44% | 53% | 3% | Eurobarometer |
| April 2014 | June 2014 | 45% | 53% | 2% | Eurobarometer |
| April 2013 | June 2013 | 38% | 60% | 2% | Eurobarometer |
| April 2012 | July 2012 | 44% | 54% | 2% | Eurobarometer |
| November 2011 | July 2012 | 45% | 52% | 3% | Eurobarometer |
| May 2011 | August 2011 | 38% | 48% | 14% | Eurobarometer |
| September 2010 | December 2010 | 41% | 49% | 10% | Eurobarometer |
| May 2010 | July 2010 | 45% | 45% | 10% | Eurobarometer |
| September 2009 | November 2009 | 45% | 44% | 11% | Eurobarometer |
| May 2009 | December 2009 | 52% | 36% | 12% | Eurobarometer |
| May 2008 | July 2008 | 41% | 46% | 13% | Eurobarometer |
| September 2007 | November 2007 | 49% | 36% | 15% | Eurobarometer |
| March 2007 | May 2007 | 46% | 42% | 12% | Eurobarometer |
| September 2006 | November 2006 | 49% | 41% | 10% | Eurobarometer |
| April 2006 | June 2006 | 50% | 39% | 11% | Eurobarometer |
| September 2005 | November 2005 | 34% | 54% | 12% | Eurobarometer |
| September 2004 | October 2004 | 40% | 49% | 11% | Eurobarometer |

=== Other surveys ===
In 2010, the Eurozone's debt crisis caused Poles' interest to cool, with two out of five Poles opposed to entry. In March 2011, research by CBOS showed that 60% of Poles were against adopting the euro while 32% were supportive, a decrease from 41% in April 2010. Surveys in the first half of 2012 indicated that 60% of Poles were opposed to adopting the common currency. Public support for the euro continued to fall, reaching record lows in the CBOS polls from July 2012, where only 25% of those polled supported a switch to the euro. However, polls conducted by TNS Polska throughout 2012–2015 have consistently shown support for eventually adopting the euro, though that support depends on the target date (as revealed by the detailed data in the table below).

The Eurobarometer poll does not take adoption timing issues into concern, meaning that this result can not be directly compared to the above results of the TNS Polska surveys, as a percentage of those being surveyed might respond with a more negative bias (assuming the survey question is about if they favour adoption now" rather than favour "adoption either now or at a later point of time perceived as being more optimal for their country").

| Date | Yes | No | Undecided | Number of participants | Held by | Ref |
|---|---|---|---|---|---|---|
| 10–13 May 2012 | 51% (13% by the end of 2014) (38% after 2014) | 28% | 21% | 1000 | TNS Polska | |
| 6–11 September 2013 | 49% (11% within 5yr) (18% in 6-10yr) (20% later than 10yr) | 40% | 11% | 1000 | TNS Polska | |
| 6–11 December 2013 | 45% (12% within 5yr) (16% in 6-10yr) (17% later than 10yr) | 40% | 15% | 1000 | TNS Polska | |
| 7–12 March 2014 | 44% (14% within 5yr) (14% in 6-10yr) (16% later than 10yr) | 42% | 14% | 1000 | TNS Polska | |
| 6–11 June 2014 | 46% (14% within 5yr) (13% in 6-10yr) (19% later than 10yr) | 42% | 12% | ? | TNS Polska | |
| 5–10 September 2014 | 45% (14% within 5yr) (14% in 6-10yr) (17% later than 10yr) | 42% | 13% | 1000 | TNS Polska | |
| 5–10 December 2014 | 49% (16% within 5yr) (15% in 6-10yr) (18% later than 10yr) | 40% | 11% | 1000 | TNS Polska | |
| 13–18 March 2015 | 44% (13% within 5yr) (12% in 6-10yr) (19% later than 10yr) | 41% | 15% | 1000 | TNS Polska | |
| 12–17 June 2015 | 46% (15% within 5yr) (14% in 6-10yr) (17% later than 10yr) | 41% | 13% | 1015 | TNS Polska | |
| 5–7 January 2023 | 24.5% (14.7% definitely yes) (9.8% rather yes) | 64.2% (49% definitely no) (15.2% rather no) | 11.3% | 1100 | IBRiS | |

The adoption support found by the 2012–15 surveys in the above table was detected while a majority of Poles in the same surveys said they expected the euro adoption would negatively impact the Polish economy. In the example, 58% of the surveyed in May 2012 had this belief. A later poll for the German Marshall Fund, published in September 2012, even found 71% of Poles believed an immediate switch to the euro would be bad for the Polish economy.

== Convergence criteria ==
The Maastricht Treaty originally required that all members of the European Union join the euro once certain economic criteria are met. As of May 2018, Poland met 2 out of the 5 criteria.

=== Convergence Reports ===
Since 1989, the European Commission and ECB prepare Convergence Reports on countries that do not participate in the euro area. According to Article 140 TFEU, at least once every 2 years reports must be issued on Member States that have not joined the eurozone.

Reports cover:

- legal compatibility;
- price stability;
- public finances;
- exchange rate stability;
- long-term interest rates; and
- additional factors.

The report of 2018 verified that Poland meets 2 out of 4 economic criteria related to price stability and public finances. Poland does not meet two criteria of exchange rate stability and long-term interest rates. Moreover, Polish law is not completely compatible with the EU Treaties. The NBP Act and the Constitution of the Republic of Poland are not fully compatible with the Article 131 of the TFEU, which is related to lack of political approval in Poland. In order to fulfil legal compatibility Poland has to change three articles of the Constitution. The first article to be changed is Article 227(1), which improperly defines the main goal of the National Bank of Poland. Secondly, Article 203(1) of the Constitution defines too broadly the powers of the Supreme Audit Office towards the National Bank. Finally, according to Article 198(1), the President of the NBP carries responsibility before the State Tribunal, which is against requirements of the independence of the national central bank.

Convergence criteria
| Assessment date | Country | HICP inflation rate (Note: The rate of change of the 12-month average HICP over the prior 12-month average must be no more than 1.5% larger than the unweighted arithmetic average of the similar HICP inflation rates in the 3 EU member states with the lowest HICP inflation. If any of these 3 states have a HICP rate significantly below the similarly averaged HICP rate for the eurozone (which according to ECB practice means more than 2% below), and if this low HICP rate has been primarily caused by exceptional circumstances (i.e. severe wage cuts or a strong recession), then such a state is not included in the calculation of the reference value and is replaced by the EU state with the fourth lowest HICP rate.) | Excessive deficit procedure | | Exchange rate | | Long-term interest rate (Note: The arithmetic average of the annual yield of 10-year government bonds as of the end of the past 12 months must be no more than 2.0% larger than the unweighted arithmetic average of the bond yields in the 3 EU member states with the lowest HICP inflation. If any of these states have bond yields which are significantly larger than the similarly averaged yield for the eurozone (which according to previous ECB reports means more than 2% above) and at the same time does not have complete funding access to financial markets (which is the case for as long as a government receives bailout funds), then such a state is not to be included in the calculation of the reference value.) | Compatibility of legislation |
| Assessment date | Country | HICP inflation rate | Budget deficit to GDP | Debt-to-GDP ratio | ERM II member | Change in rate (Note: The change in the annual average exchange rate against the euro.) | Long-term interest rate | Compatibility of legislation |
| 2012 ECB Report (Note: Reference values from the ECB convergence report of May 2012.) | Reference values | Max. 3.1% (Note: Sweden, Ireland and Slovenia were the reference states.) (as of 31 Mar 2012) | None open (as of 31 Mar 2012) | | Min. 2 years (as of 31 Mar 2012) | Max. ±15% (Note: The maximum allowed change in rate is ± 2.25% for Denmark.) (for 2011) | Max. 5.80% (Note: Sweden and Slovenia were the reference states, with Ireland excluded as an outlier.) (as of 31 Mar 2012) | Compliant (as of 31 Mar 2012) |
| 2012 ECB Report | Reference values | Max. 3.1% (as of 31 Mar 2012) | Max. 3.0% (FY 2011) | Max. 60% (FY 2011) | Min. 2 years (as of 31 Mar 2012) | Max. ±15% (for 2011) | Max. 5.80% (as of 31 Mar 2012) | Compliant (as of 31 Mar 2012) |
|---|---|---|---|---|---|---|---|---|
| 2012 ECB Report | Poland | 4.0% | Open | | No | -3.2% | 5.77% | No |
| 2012 ECB Report | Poland | 4.0% | 5.1% | 56.3% | No | -3.2% | 5.77% | No |
| 2013 ECB Report (Note: Reference values from the ECB convergence report of June 2013.) | Reference values | Max. 2.7% (Note: Sweden, Latvia and Ireland were the reference states.) (as of 30 Apr 2013) | None open (as of 30 Apr 2013) | | Min. 2 years (as of 30 Apr 2013) | Max. ±15% (for 2012) | Max. 5.5% (as of 30 Apr 2013) | Compliant (as of 30 Apr 2013) |
| 2013 ECB Report | Reference values | Max. 2.7% (as of 30 Apr 2013) | Max. 3.0% (FY 2012) | Max. 60% (FY 2012) | Min. 2 years (as of 30 Apr 2013) | Max. ±15% (for 2012) | Max. 5.5% (as of 30 Apr 2013) | Compliant (as of 30 Apr 2013) |
| 2013 ECB Report | Poland | 2.7% | Open | | No | -1.6% | 4.44% | Not assessed |
| 2013 ECB Report | Poland | 2.7% | 3.9% | 55.6% | No | -1.6% | 4.44% | Not assessed |
| 2014 ECB Report (Note: Reference values from the ECB convergence report of June 2014.) | Reference values | Max. 1.7% (Note: Latvia, Portugal and Ireland were the reference states, with Greece, Bulgaria and Cyprus excluded as outliers.) (as of 30 Apr 2014) | None open (as of 30 Apr 2014) | | Min. 2 years (as of 30 Apr 2014) | Max. ±15% (for 2013) | Max. 6.2% (Note: Latvia, Ireland and Portugal were the reference states.) (as of 30 Apr 2014) | Compliant (as of 30 Apr 2014) |
| 2014 ECB Report | Reference values | Max. 1.7% (as of 30 Apr 2014) | Max. 3.0% (FY 2013) | Max. 60% (FY 2013) | Min. 2 years (as of 30 Apr 2014) | Max. ±15% (for 2013) | Max. 6.2% (as of 30 Apr 2014) | Compliant (as of 30 Apr 2014) |
| 2014 ECB Report | Poland | 0.6% | Open | | No | -0.3% | 4.19% | No |
| 2014 ECB Report | Poland | 0.6% | 4.3% | 57.0% | No | -0.3% | 4.19% | No |
| 2016 ECB Report (Note: Reference values from the ECB convergence report of June 2016.) | Reference values | Max. 0.7% (Note: Bulgaria, Slovenia and Spain were the reference states, with Cyprus and Romania excluded as outliers.) (as of 30 Apr 2016) | None open (as of 18 May 2016) | | Min. 2 years (as of 18 May 2016) | Max. ±15% (for 2015) | Max. 4.0% (Note: Slovenia, Spain and Bulgaria were the reference states.) (as of 30 Apr 2016) | Compliant (as of 18 May 2016) |
| 2016 ECB Report | Reference values | Max. 0.7% (as of 30 Apr 2016) | Max. 3.0% (FY 2015) | Max. 60% (FY 2015) | Min. 2 years (as of 18 May 2016) | Max. ±15% (for 2015) | Max. 4.0% (as of 30 Apr 2016) | Compliant (as of 18 May 2016) |
| 2016 ECB Report | Poland | -0.5% | None | | No | 0.0% | 2.9% | No |
| 2016 ECB Report | Poland | -0.5% | 2.6% | 51.3% | No | 0.0% | 2.9% | No |
| 2018 ECB Report (Note: Reference values from the ECB convergence report of May 2018.) | Reference values | Max. 1.9% (Note: Cyprus, Ireland and Finland were the reference states.) (as of 31 Mar 2018) | None open (as of 3 May 2018) | | Min. 2 years (as of 3 May 2018) | Max. ±15% (for 2017) | Max. 3.2% (Note: Cyprus, Ireland and Finland were the reference states.) (as of 31 Mar 2018) | Compliant (as of 20 March 2018) |
| 2018 ECB Report | Reference values | Max. 1.9% (as of 31 Mar 2018) | Max. 3.0% (FY 2017) | Max. 60% (FY 2017) | Min. 2 years (as of 3 May 2018) | Max. ±15% (for 2017) | Max. 3.2% (as of 31 Mar 2018) | Compliant (as of 20 March 2018) |
| 2018 ECB Report | Poland | 1.4% | None | | No | 2.4% | 3.3% | No |
| 2018 ECB Report | Poland | 1.4% | 1.7% | 50.6% | No | 2.4% | 3.3% | No |
| 2020 ECB Report (Note: Reference values from the ECB convergence report of June 2020.) | Reference values | Max. 1.8% (Note: Portugal, Cyprus, and Italy were the reference states.) (as of 31 Mar 2020) | None open (as of 7 May 2020) | | Min. 2 years (as of 7 May 2020) | Max. ±15% (for 2019) | Max. 2.9% (Note: Portugal, Cyprus, and Italy were the reference states.) (as of 31 Mar 2020) | Compliant (as of 24 March 2020) |
| 2020 ECB Report | Reference values | Max. 1.8% (as of 31 Mar 2020) | Max. 3.0% (FY 2019) | Max. 60% (FY 2019) | Min. 2 years (as of 7 May 2020) | Max. ±15% (for 2019) | Max. 2.9% (as of 31 Mar 2020) | Compliant (as of 24 March 2020) |
| 2020 ECB Report | Poland | 2.8% | None | | No | -0.8% | 2.2% | No |
| 2020 ECB Report | Poland | 2.8% | 0.7% | 46.0% | No | -0.8% | 2.2% | No |
| 2022 ECB Report (Note: Reference values from the Convergence Report of June 2022.) | Reference values | Max. 4.9% (Note: France, Finland, and Greece were the reference states.) (as of April 2022) | None open (as of 25 May 2022) | | Min. 2 years (as of 25 May 2022) | Max. ±15% (for 2021) | Max. 2.6% (as of April 2022) | Compliant (as of 25 March 2022) |
| 2022 ECB Report | Reference values | Max. 4.9% (as of April 2022) | Max. 3.0% (FY 2021) | Max. 60% (FY 2021) | Min. 2 years (as of 25 May 2022) | Max. ±15% (for 2021) | Max. 2.6% (as of April 2022) | Compliant (as of 25 March 2022) |
| 2022 ECB Report | Poland | 7.0% | None | | No | -2.7% | 3.0% | No |
| 2022 ECB Report | Poland | 7.0% | 1.9% | 53.8% | No | -2.7% | 3.0% | No |
| 2024 ECB Report (Note: Reference values from the Convergence Report of June 2024.) | Reference values | Max. 3.3% (Note: Belgium, Denmark, and the Netherlands were the reference states.) (as of May 2024) | None open (as of 19 June 2024) | | Min. 2 years (as of 19 June 2024) | Max. ±15% (for 2023) | Max. 4.8% (as of May 2024) | Compliant (as of 27 March 2024) |
| 2024 ECB Report | Reference values | Max. 3.3% (as of May 2024) | Max. 3.0% (FY 2023) | Max. 60% (FY 2023) | Min. 2 years (as of 19 June 2024) | Max. ±15% (for 2023) | Max. 4.8% (as of May 2024) | Compliant (as of 27 March 2024) |
| 2024 ECB Report | Poland | 6.1% | None | | No | 3.1% | 5.6% | No |
| 2024 ECB Report | Poland | 6.1% | 5.1% | 49.6% | No | 3.1% | 5.6% | No |
| 2025 ECB Report (Note: Reference values from the Convergence Report of June 2025.) | Reference values | Max. 2.8% (Note: Finland, Ireland, and Italy were the reference states.) (as of April 2025) | None open (as of 19 May 2025) | | Min. 2 years (as of 19 May 2025) | Max. ±15% (for 2024) | Max. 5.1% (as of April 2025) | Compliant (as of 15 April 2025) |
| 2025 ECB Report | Reference values | Max. 2.8% (as of April 2025) | Max. 3.0% (FY 2024) | Max. 60% (FY 2024) | Min. 2 years (as of 19 May 2025) | Max. ±15% (for 2024) | Max. 5.1% (as of April 2025) | Compliant (as of 15 April 2025) |
| 2025 ECB Report | Poland | 3.9% | Open | | No | 5.2% | 5.3% | Not assessed |
| 2025 ECB Report | Poland | 3.9% | 6.6% | 55.3% | No | 5.2% | 5.3% | Not assessed |
| 2026 ECB Report (Note: Reference values from the Convergence Report of June 2026.) | Reference values | Max. 2.7% (Note: Cyprus, Denmark, and France were the reference states.) (as of May 2026) | None open (as of 17 June 2026) | | Min. 2 years (as of 17 June 2026) | Max. ±15% (for 2025) | Max. 5.1% (as of May 2026) | Compliant (as of 25 March 2026) |
| 2026 ECB Report | Reference values | Max. 2.7% (as of May 2026) | Max. 3.0% (FY 2025) | Max. 60% (FY 2025) | Min. 2 years (as of 17 June 2026) | Max. ±15% (for 2025) | Max. 5.1% (as of May 2026) | Compliant (as of 25 March 2026) |
| 2026 ECB Report | Poland | 2.9% | Open | | No | 1.5% | 5.4% | No |
| 2026 ECB Report | Poland | 2.9% | 7.3% | 59.7% | No | 1.5% | 5.4% | No |

Criterion fulfilled
Criterion potentially fulfilled: If the budget deficit exceeds the 3% limit, but is "close" to this value (the European Commission has deemed 3.5% to be close by in the past), then the criteria can still potentially be fulfilled if either the deficits in the previous two years are significantly declining towards the 3% limit, or if the excessive deficit is the result of exceptional circumstances which are temporary in nature (i.e. one-off expenditures triggered by a significant economic downturn, or by the implementation of economic reforms that are expected to deliver a significant positive impact on the government's future fiscal budgets). However, even if such "special circumstances" are found to exist, additional criteria must also be met to comply with the fiscal budget criterion. Additionally, if the debt-to-GDP ratio exceeds 60% but is "sufficiently diminishing and approaching the reference value at a satisfactory pace" it can be deemed to be in compliance.
Criterion not fulfilled

== See also ==
- Enlargement of the eurozone
- Poland in the European Union
