= Sweden and the euro =

Eurozone participation European Union member states (special territories not shown) 21 in the eurozone 1 in ERM II, with an opt-out (Denmark) 5 not in ERM II, but committed to join the eurozone after meeting the convergence criteria (Czech Republic, Hungary, Poland, Romania, and Sweden) Non–EU member states 4 using the euro with a monetary agreement (Andorra, Monaco, San Marino, and Vatican City) 2 using the euro unilaterally (Kosovo and Montenegro)

Sweden does not currently use the euro as its currency and has no plans to replace the Swedish krona in the near future. Sweden's Treaty of Accession of 1994 made it subject to the Treaty of Maastricht, which obliges states to join the eurozone once they meet the necessary conditions. Sweden maintains that joining the European Exchange Rate Mechanism (ERM II), in which participation for at least two years is a requirement for euro adoption, is voluntary, and has chosen to remain outside pending public approval by a referendum, thereby intentionally avoiding the fulfilment of the adoption requirements.

== Status ==
EUR-SEK exchange rate since 1999

The Swedish krona had a fixed exchange rate from the last devaluation in 1982, until 1992. On 17 May 1991, the Swedish Central Bank pegged the krona to the European Currency Unit (ECU), but outside the European Exchange Rate Mechanism ERM I. The pegging was unilateral. At first, the ECU attachment seemed to bring about increased confidence in the Swedish krona, but this was only temporary. A 500 percent marginal interest rate for a short period was not enough to defend the krona against speculation, and Sweden had to abandon the fixed exchange rate on 16 September 1992.

Sweden joined the European Union in 1995 and its accession treaty has since obliged it to adopt the euro once the country is found to comply with all the convergence criteria. However, one of the requirements for eurozone membership is two years' membership of ERM II, and Sweden has chosen not to join this mechanism, which would peg the Swedish currency to the euro ±2.25%. The Swedish krona (SEK) floats freely alongside other currencies. Most of Sweden's major parties believe that it would be in the national interest to join, but they have all pledged to abide by the result of the referendum.

Olli Rehn, the EU commissioner for economic affairs, has said that it is up to Swedish people to decide when to adopt the euro. Despite this, the euro can be used to pay for goods and services in some places in Sweden. (See below.)

Sweden meets four of five conditions for joining the euro as of June 2022. The table below gives further details:

Convergence criteria
Assessment date	Country	HICP inflation rate (Note: The rate of change of the 12-month average HICP over the prior 12-month average must be no more than 1.5% larger than the unweighted arithmetic average of the similar HICP inflation rates in the 3 EU member states with the lowest HICP inflation. If any of these 3 states have a HICP rate significantly below the similarly averaged HICP rate for the eurozone (which according to ECB practice means more than 2% below), and if this low HICP rate has been primarily caused by exceptional circumstances (i.e. severe wage cuts or a strong recession), then such a state is not included in the calculation of the reference value and is replaced by the EU state with the fourth lowest HICP rate.)	Excessive deficit procedure		Exchange rate		Long-term interest rate (Note: The arithmetic average of the annual yield of 10-year government bonds as of the end of the past 12 months must be no more than 2.0% larger than the unweighted arithmetic average of the bond yields in the 3 EU member states with the lowest HICP inflation. If any of these states have bond yields which are significantly larger than the similarly averaged yield for the eurozone (which according to previous ECB reports means more than 2% above) and at the same time does not have complete funding access to financial markets (which is the case for as long as a government receives bailout funds), then such a state is not to be included in the calculation of the reference value.)	Compatibility of legislation
Assessment date	Country	HICP inflation rate	Budget deficit to GDP	Debt-to-GDP ratio	ERM II member	Change in rate (Note: The change in the annual average exchange rate against the euro.)	Long-term interest rate	Compatibility of legislation
2012 ECB Report (Note: Reference values from the ECB convergence report of May 2012.)	Reference values	Max. 3.1% (Note: Sweden, Ireland and Slovenia were the reference states.) (as of 31 Mar 2012)	None open (as of 31 Mar 2012)		Min. 2 years (as of 31 Mar 2012)	Max. ±15% (Note: The maximum allowed change in rate is ± 2.25% for Denmark.) (for 2011)	Max. 5.80% (Note: Sweden and Slovenia were the reference states, with Ireland excluded as an outlier.) (as of 31 Mar 2012)	Compliant (as of 31 Mar 2012)
2012 ECB Report	Reference values	Max. 3.1% (as of 31 Mar 2012)	Max. 3.0% (FY 2011)	Max. 60% (FY 2011)	Min. 2 years (as of 31 Mar 2012)	Max. ±15% (for 2011)	Max. 5.80% (as of 31 Mar 2012)	Compliant (as of 31 Mar 2012)
2012 ECB Report	Sweden	1.3%	None		No	5.3%	2.23%	No
2012 ECB Report	Sweden	1.3%	-0.3% (surplus)	38.4%	No	5.3%	2.23%	No
2013 ECB Report (Note: Reference values from the ECB convergence report of June 2013.)	Reference values	Max. 2.7% (Note: Sweden, Latvia and Ireland were the reference states.) (as of 30 Apr 2013)	None open (as of 30 Apr 2013)		Min. 2 years (as of 30 Apr 2013)	Max. ±15% (for 2012)	Max. 5.5% (as of 30 Apr 2013)	Compliant (as of 30 Apr 2013)
2013 ECB Report	Reference values	Max. 2.7% (as of 30 Apr 2013)	Max. 3.0% (FY 2012)	Max. 60% (FY 2012)	Min. 2 years (as of 30 Apr 2013)	Max. ±15% (for 2012)	Max. 5.5% (as of 30 Apr 2013)	Compliant (as of 30 Apr 2013)
2013 ECB Report	Sweden	0.8%	None		No	3.6%	1.59%	Not assessed
2013 ECB Report	Sweden	0.8%	0.5%	38.2%	No	3.6%	1.59%	Not assessed
2014 ECB Report (Note: Reference values from the ECB convergence report of June 2014.)	Reference values	Max. 1.7% (Note: Latvia, Portugal and Ireland were the reference states, with Greece, Bulgaria and Cyprus excluded as outliers.) (as of 30 Apr 2014)	None open (as of 30 Apr 2014)		Min. 2 years (as of 30 Apr 2014)	Max. ±15% (for 2013)	Max. 6.2% (Note: Latvia, Ireland and Portugal were the reference states.) (as of 30 Apr 2014)	Compliant (as of 30 Apr 2014)
2014 ECB Report	Reference values	Max. 1.7% (as of 30 Apr 2014)	Max. 3.0% (FY 2013)	Max. 60% (FY 2013)	Min. 2 years (as of 30 Apr 2014)	Max. ±15% (for 2013)	Max. 6.2% (as of 30 Apr 2014)	Compliant (as of 30 Apr 2014)
2014 ECB Report	Sweden	0.3%	None		No	0.6%	2.24%	No
2014 ECB Report	Sweden	0.3%	1.1%	40.6%	No	0.6%	2.24%	No
2016 ECB Report (Note: Reference values from the ECB convergence report of June 2016.)	Reference values	Max. 0.7% (Note: Bulgaria, Slovenia and Spain were the reference states, with Cyprus and Romania excluded as outliers.) (as of 30 Apr 2016)	None open (as of 18 May 2016)		Min. 2 years (as of 18 May 2016)	Max. ±15% (for 2015)	Max. 4.0% (Note: Slovenia, Spain and Bulgaria were the reference states.) (as of 30 Apr 2016)	Compliant (as of 18 May 2016)
2016 ECB Report	Reference values	Max. 0.7% (as of 30 Apr 2016)	Max. 3.0% (FY 2015)	Max. 60% (FY 2015)	Min. 2 years (as of 18 May 2016)	Max. ±15% (for 2015)	Max. 4.0% (as of 30 Apr 2016)	Compliant (as of 18 May 2016)
2016 ECB Report	Sweden	0.9%	None		No	-2.8%	0.8%	No
2016 ECB Report	Sweden	0.9%	0.0%	43.4%	No	-2.8%	0.8%	No
2018 ECB Report (Note: Reference values from the ECB convergence report of May 2018.)	Reference values	Max. 1.9% (Note: Cyprus, Ireland and Finland were the reference states.) (as of 31 Mar 2018)	None open (as of 3 May 2018)		Min. 2 years (as of 3 May 2018)	Max. ±15% (for 2017)	Max. 3.2% (Note: Cyprus, Ireland and Finland were the reference states.) (as of 31 Mar 2018)	Compliant (as of 20 March 2018)
2018 ECB Report	Reference values	Max. 1.9% (as of 31 Mar 2018)	Max. 3.0% (FY 2017)	Max. 60% (FY 2017)	Min. 2 years (as of 3 May 2018)	Max. ±15% (for 2017)	Max. 3.2% (as of 31 Mar 2018)	Compliant (as of 20 March 2018)
2018 ECB Report	Sweden	1.9%	None		No	-1.8%	0.7%	No
2018 ECB Report	Sweden	1.9%	-1.3% (surplus)	40.6%	No	-1.8%	0.7%	No
2020 ECB Report (Note: Reference values from the ECB convergence report of June 2020.)	Reference values	Max. 1.8% (Note: Portugal, Cyprus, and Italy were the reference states.) (as of 31 Mar 2020)	None open (as of 7 May 2020)		Min. 2 years (as of 7 May 2020)	Max. ±15% (for 2019)	Max. 2.9% (Note: Portugal, Cyprus, and Italy were the reference states.) (as of 31 Mar 2020)	Compliant (as of 24 March 2020)
2020 ECB Report	Reference values	Max. 1.8% (as of 31 Mar 2020)	Max. 3.0% (FY 2019)	Max. 60% (FY 2019)	Min. 2 years (as of 7 May 2020)	Max. ±15% (for 2019)	Max. 2.9% (as of 31 Mar 2020)	Compliant (as of 24 March 2020)
2020 ECB Report	Sweden	1.6%	None		No	-3.2%	-0.1%	No
2020 ECB Report	Sweden	1.6%	-0.5% (surplus)	35.1%	No	-3.2%	-0.1%	No
2022 ECB Report (Note: Reference values from the Convergence Report of June 2022.)	Reference values	Max. 4.9% (Note: France, Finland, and Greece were the reference states.) (as of April 2022)	None open (as of 25 May 2022)		Min. 2 years (as of 25 May 2022)	Max. ±15% (for 2021)	Max. 2.6% (as of April 2022)	Compliant (as of 25 March 2022)
2022 ECB Report	Reference values	Max. 4.9% (as of April 2022)	Max. 3.0% (FY 2021)	Max. 60% (FY 2021)	Min. 2 years (as of 25 May 2022)	Max. ±15% (for 2021)	Max. 2.6% (as of April 2022)	Compliant (as of 25 March 2022)
2022 ECB Report	Sweden	3.7%	None		No	3.2%	0.4%	No
2022 ECB Report	Sweden	3.7%	0.2%	36.7%	No	3.2%	0.4%	No
2024 ECB Report (Note: Reference values from the Convergence Report of June 2024.)	Reference values	Max. 3.3% (Note: Belgium, Denmark, and the Netherlands were the reference states.) (as of May 2024)	None open (as of 19 June 2024)		Min. 2 years (as of 19 June 2024)	Max. ±15% (for 2023)	Max. 4.8% (as of May 2024)	Compliant (as of 27 March 2024)
2024 ECB Report	Reference values	Max. 3.3% (as of May 2024)	Max. 3.0% (FY 2023)	Max. 60% (FY 2023)	Min. 2 years (as of 19 June 2024)	Max. ±15% (for 2023)	Max. 4.8% (as of May 2024)	Compliant (as of 27 March 2024)
2024 ECB Report	Sweden	3.6%	None		No	−8.0%	2.5%	No
2024 ECB Report	Sweden	3.6%	0.6%	31.2%	No	−8.0%	2.5%	No
2025 ECB Report (Note: Reference values from the Convergence Report of June 2025.)	Reference values	Max. 2.8% (Note: Finland, Ireland, and Italy were the reference states.) (as of April 2025)	None open (as of 19 May 2025)		Min. 2 years (as of 19 May 2025)	Max. ±15% (for 2024)	Max. 5.1% (as of April 2025)	Compliant (as of 15 April 2025)
2025 ECB Report	Reference values	Max. 2.8% (as of April 2025)	Max. 3.0% (FY 2024)	Max. 60% (FY 2024)	Min. 2 years (as of 19 May 2025)	Max. ±15% (for 2024)	Max. 5.1% (as of April 2025)	Compliant (as of 15 April 2025)
2025 ECB Report	Sweden	1.9%	None		No	0.4%	2.4%	Not assessed
2025 ECB Report	Sweden	1.9%	1.5%	33.5%	No	0.4%	2.4%	Not assessed
2026 ECB Report (Note: Reference values from the Convergence Report of June 2026.)	Reference values	Max. 2.7% (Note: Cyprus, Denmark, and France were the reference states.) (as of May 2026)	None open (as of 17 June 2026)		Min. 2 years (as of 17 June 2026)	Max. ±15% (for 2025)	Max. 5.1% (as of May 2026)	Compliant (as of 25 March 2026)
2026 ECB Report	Reference values	Max. 2.7% (as of May 2026)	Max. 3.0% (FY 2025)	Max. 60% (FY 2025)	Min. 2 years (as of 17 June 2026)	Max. ±15% (for 2025)	Max. 5.1% (as of May 2026)	Compliant (as of 25 March 2026)
2026 ECB Report	Sweden	2.2%	None		No	3.2%	2.6%	No
2026 ECB Report	Sweden	2.2%	1.3%	35.1%	No	3.2%	2.6%	No

Criterion fulfilled
Criterion potentially fulfilled: If the budget deficit exceeds the 3% limit, but is "close" to this value (the European Commission has deemed 3.5% to be close by in the past), then the criteria can still potentially be fulfilled if either the deficits in the previous two years are significantly declining towards the 3% limit, or if the excessive deficit is the result of exceptional circumstances which are temporary in nature (i.e. one-off expenditures triggered by a significant economic downturn, or by the implementation of economic reforms that are expected to deliver a significant positive impact on the government's future fiscal budgets). However, even if such "special circumstances" are found to exist, additional criteria must also be met to comply with the fiscal budget criterion. Additionally, if the debt-to-GDP ratio exceeds 60% but is "sufficiently diminishing and approaching the reference value at a satisfactory pace" it can be deemed to be in compliance.
Criterion not fulfilled

== History ==
=== Early monetary unions in Sweden (1873–1914) ===
On 5 May 1873 Denmark with Sweden fixed their currencies against gold and formed the Scandinavian Monetary Union. Prior to this date Sweden used Swedish riksdaler. In 1875 Norway joined this union. An equal valued krona of the monetary union replaced the three legacy currencies at the rate of 1 krona = ½ Danish rigsdaler = ¼ Norwegian speciedaler = 1 Swedish riksdaler. The new currency (krona) became a legal tender and was accepted in all three countries – Denmark, Sweden and Norway. This monetary union lasted until 1914, when it was brought to an end by World War I. As of 2014, the names of the currencies in each country have remained unchanged ("krona" in Sweden, "krone" in Norway and Denmark).

=== Joining the European Union ===
The Swedish European Union membership referendum of 1994 approved—with a 52% majority—the Accession Treaty and in 1995 Sweden joined the EU. According to the treaty Sweden is obliged to adopt the euro once it meets convergence criteria.

=== 2003 referendum ===
A referendum held in September 2003 saw 55.9 percent vote against membership of the eurozone. As a consequence, Sweden decided in 2003 not to adopt the euro for the time being. If they had voted in favour, Sweden would have adopted the euro on 1 January 2006.

A majority of voters in Stockholm County voted in favour of adopting the euro (54.7% "yes", 43.2% "no"). In Skåne County the people voting "yes" (49.3%) outnumbered the people voting "no" (48.5%), although the invalid and blank votes resulted in no majority for either option. In all other counties, the majority voted no.

== Usage today ==
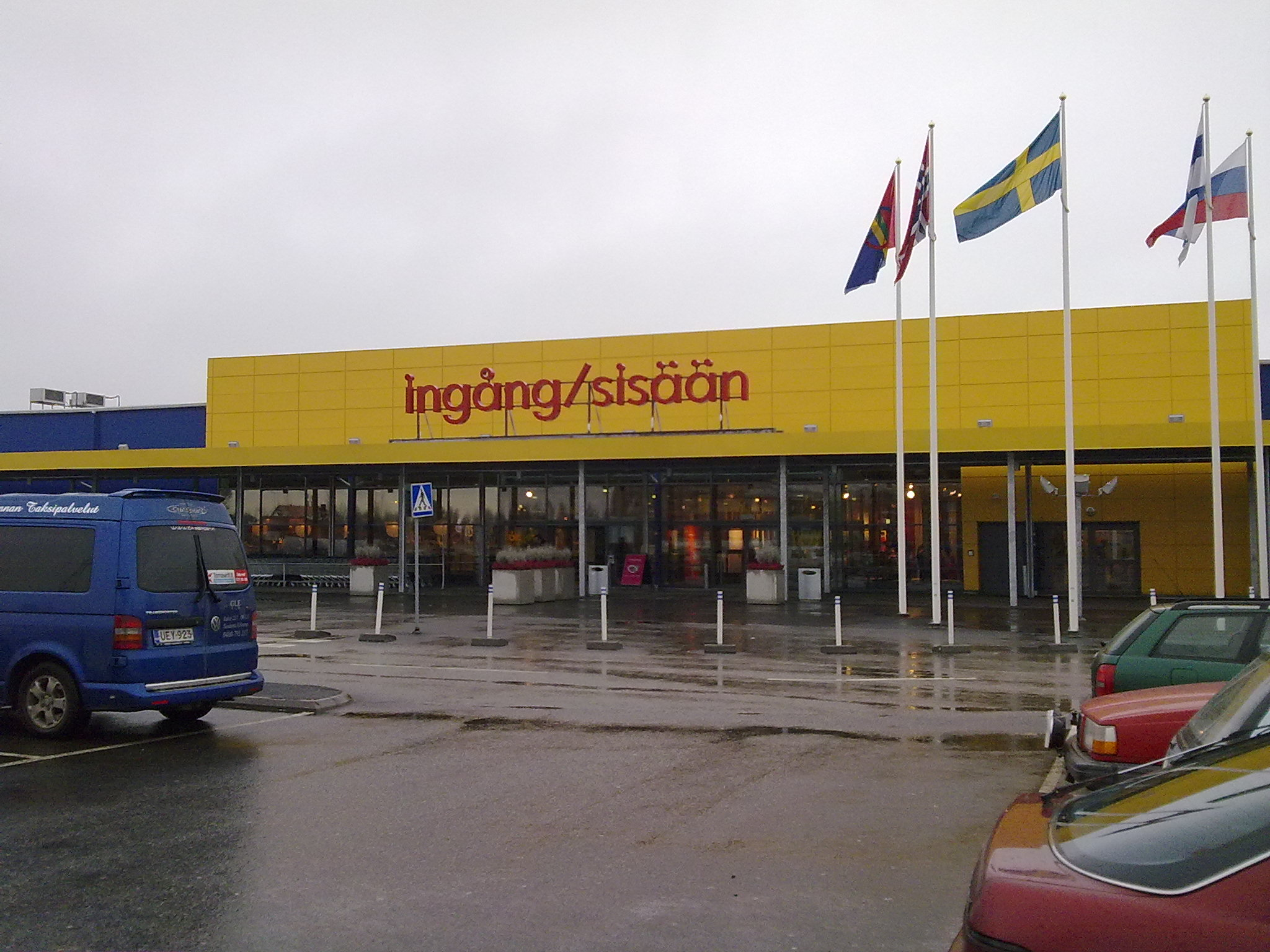
IKEA in Haparanda, the base for the shopping center which attracts many Finns.

Cities and municipalities discussed in this section.

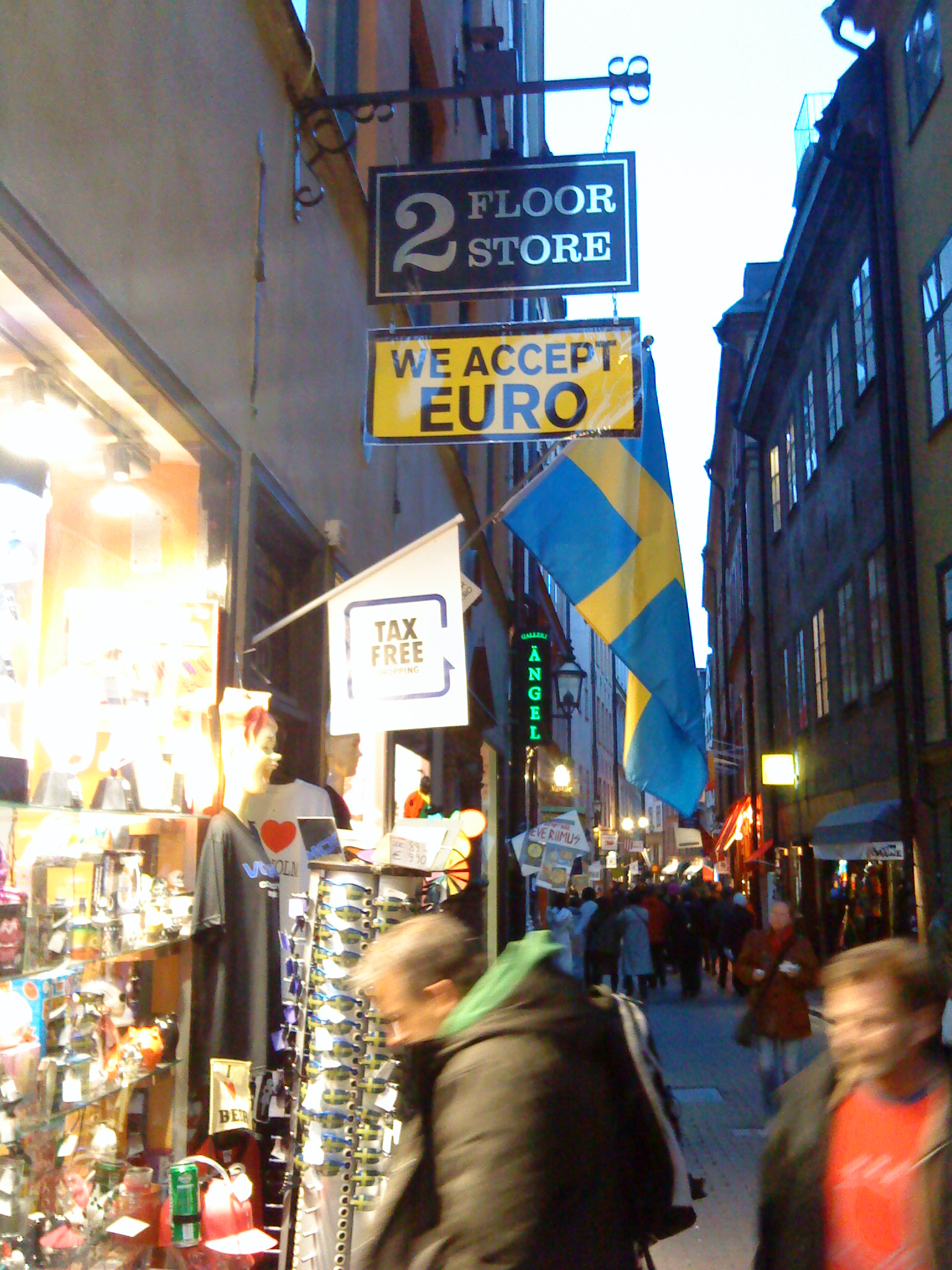
Shop in Stockholm that accepts euros, in the tourist district. Signs like this one are not so common in Stockholm.

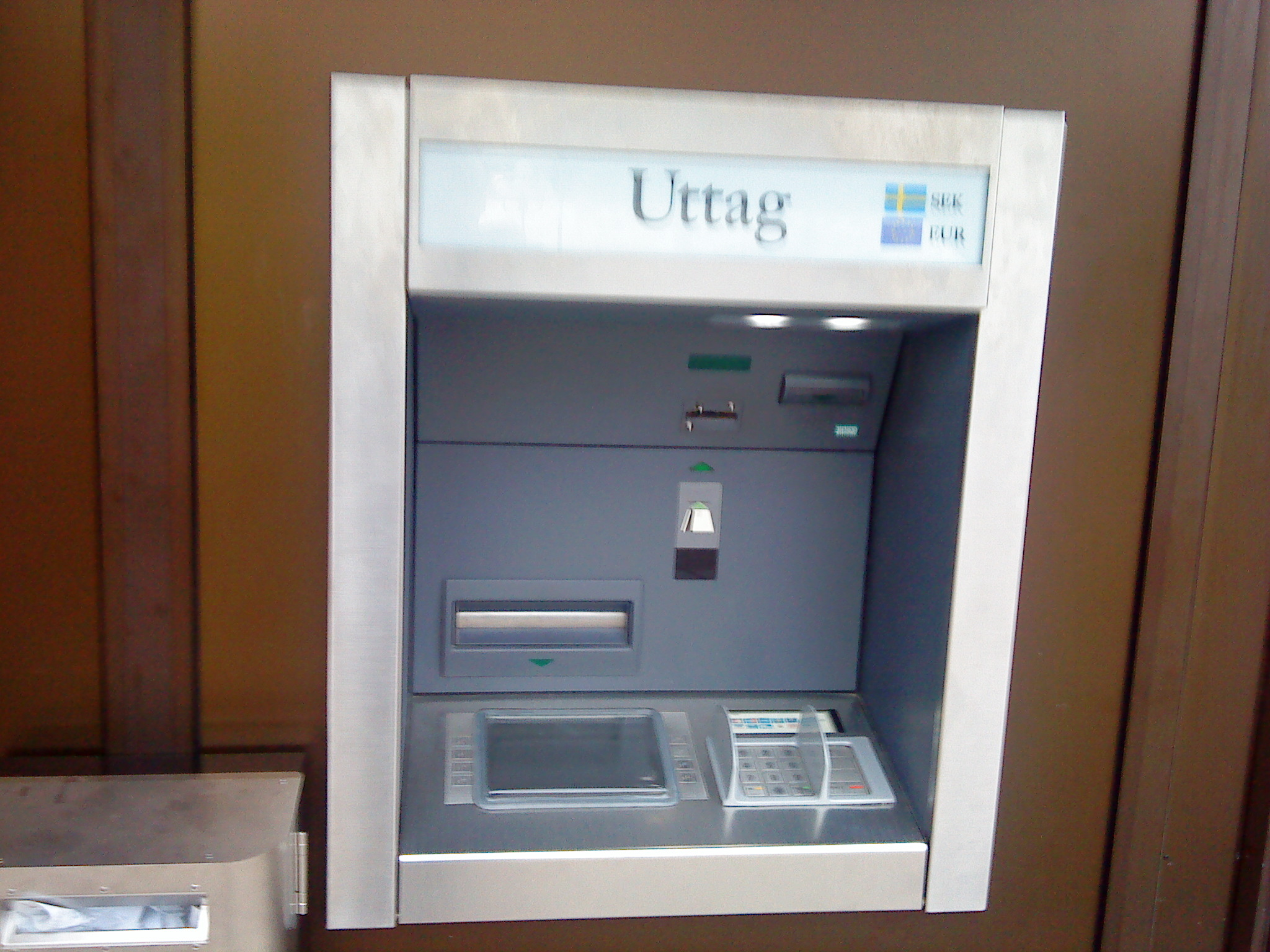
This ATM gives out both euros and kronor.

Some shops, hotels and restaurants may accept euros, often limited to notes and giving change in Swedish Krona. This is especially common in some border cities. Shops especially oriented towards foreign tourists are more likely to accept foreign currencies (such as the euro) than other shops. Payphones in Sweden were able to accept coins in both Swedish kronor and euro since the year 2000. The last payphone was dismantled in 2015.

=== Municipalities ===
==== Official currency status ====
Matters such as official currency status and legal tender issues are decided by the Swedish parliament, and the euro is not an official currency of any part of Sweden. Nevertheless, politicians from some municipalities (see below) have claimed that the euro is an official currency of their municipalities. This means that the municipality has made an agreement with many shops that they should accept euros (in cash and credit cards). However this is not mandatory for the stores and the status as "official currency" is mostly a marketing device rather than a legal mandate.

==== Haparanda ====
The only Swedish city near the eurozone is Haparanda, where almost all stores accept euros as cash and often display prices in euros. Haparanda has become an important shopping city with the establishment of IKEA and other stores. 200,000 Finns live within 150 km.

Some municipalities, especially Haparanda, wanted to have the euro as a legally official currency, and, for example, contract salaries in euros to employees from Finland. However, this is illegal due to tax laws and salary rules. (The actual payment can be in euro, handled by the bank, but the salary contract and the tax documentation must be in kronor).

Haparanda's budget is presented in both currencies. Haparanda has a close cooperation with the neighbour city of Tornio, Finland.

==== Höganäs ====
The town of Höganäs claimed to have adopted the euro for shops on 1 January 2009. From that date, all residents can use either kronor or euro in restaurants and shops, as well as in payments of rent and bills. Dual pricing is used at many places and ATMs dispense either currency without additional charge (the latter is law all over Sweden). Around 60 percent of stores in the town are reported to have signed up to the scheme and local banks have developed guidelines to accept euro deposits. This decision was approved and agreed by the municipality of Höganäs. Höganäs has developed a special euro logo for the city. It is not a law in Höganäs, just a recommendation. This has been a rather successful PR coup, with good coverage in newspapers, and it has been mentioned also in foreign newspapers.

==== Helsingborg, Landskrona and Malmö ====
Some shops accept euros, and price tags in euros exist in some tourist oriented shops, as in more cities in Sweden. Euro are typically accepted at 24-hour open petrol stations, international fast food chains and at hotels.

==== Pajala and Övertorneå ====
The Pajala and Övertorneå municipalities have borders to Finland (and thus to the eurozone). The euro is often accepted in shops and sometimes shown on price tags, but there is no official adoption of the euro from the municipality point of view. There was a rejected political proposal to officially adopt the euro in Pajala.

==== Sollentuna ====
There was a political proposal in June 2009 from a party in the Sollentuna Municipality, that the municipality should adopt the euro as its parallel currency in 2010.

==== Stockholm ====
Stockholm is the most important tourist city in Sweden, measured as the number of nights spent by tourists. Some tourist-oriented shops accept euros, although there is no official policy from the municipality. Taxi services in Stockholm can be paid in euros. In 2009 there was a rejected political proposal to officially introduce the euro in Stockholm.

=== Cash machines ===
Some cash machines can dispense foreign currency. Usually euros, but sometimes British pounds, US dollars, Danish kroner or Norwegian kroner can be dispensed instead. All of these cash machines also dispense Swedish kronor. Most of these cash machines are located in major cities, international airports and border areas.

=== Presence of the euro in Swedish law and bank system ===
The euro is present in some elements of Swedish law, based on EU directives. For example, an EU directive states that all transactions in euros inside the EU shall have the same fees as euro transactions within the country concerned. The Swedish government has made an amendment which states that the directive also applies to krona-based transactions. This means, for example, that euros can be withdrawn without fees from Swedish banks at any ATM in the eurozone, and that krona- and euro-based transfers to bank accounts in the European Economic Area can be done over the internet without a sending fee. The receiving banks can still sometimes charge a fee for receiving the payment, though, although the same EU directive typically makes this impossible for euro-based transfers to eurozone countries. This is different from, for example, Denmark where banks are required to set the price for international euro transactions within the European Economic Area to the same price as for domestic Danish euro transactions (which does not have to be the same as the price for domestic Danish krone transactions). However, banks in Sweden still decide the exchange rate, and so are able to continue charging a small percentage for exchanging between kronor and euros when using card payments.

It is also now possible for limited companies (companies limited by shares) to have their accounts and share capital denominated in euros. The law about money laundering is based on an EU directive and sets a limit of €5,000 for cash transactions to be investigated regarding origin of money and receipts to be claimed, by companies such as banks, car dealers etc.

Many more Swedish laws today include amounts in euro due to EU directives.

== Plans ==
Most major political parties in Sweden (as of 2006), including the formerly governing coalition Alliance for Sweden (except the Centre Party) and the currently governing Moderate Party, which won the 2022 election, are in principle in favour of introducing the euro.

Tommy Waidelich, then economic spokesperson for the Social Democratic Party, ruled out Swedish eurozone membership for the foreseeable future in August 2011.

The newspaper Sydsvenska Dagbladet claimed on 26 November 2007 (a few days after the former Danish Prime Minister, Anders Fogh Rasmussen, had announced plans to hold another referendum on abolishing Denmark's opt-outs including the opt-out from the euro) that the question of another euro referendum would be one of the central issues of the 2010 election in Sweden. Prime Minister Fredrik Reinfeldt stated in December 2007 that when more neighbours use the euro, it will be more visible that Sweden does not.

Swedish politician Olle Schmidt in an interview with journalists from the European Parliament 2008 when asked when Sweden will have good reasons to adopt the euro, he said "When the Baltic countries join the euro, the whole Baltic Sea will be surrounded by euro coins. Then the resistance will drop. I hope for a referendum in Sweden in 2010." Lithuania adopted the euro as the last Baltic country in 2015.

The then leader of the Social Democratic Party, Mona Sahlin, stated in 2008 that a new referendum would not occur in the period 2010–2013, because the 2003 referendum still counted.

=== 2009 European elections ===
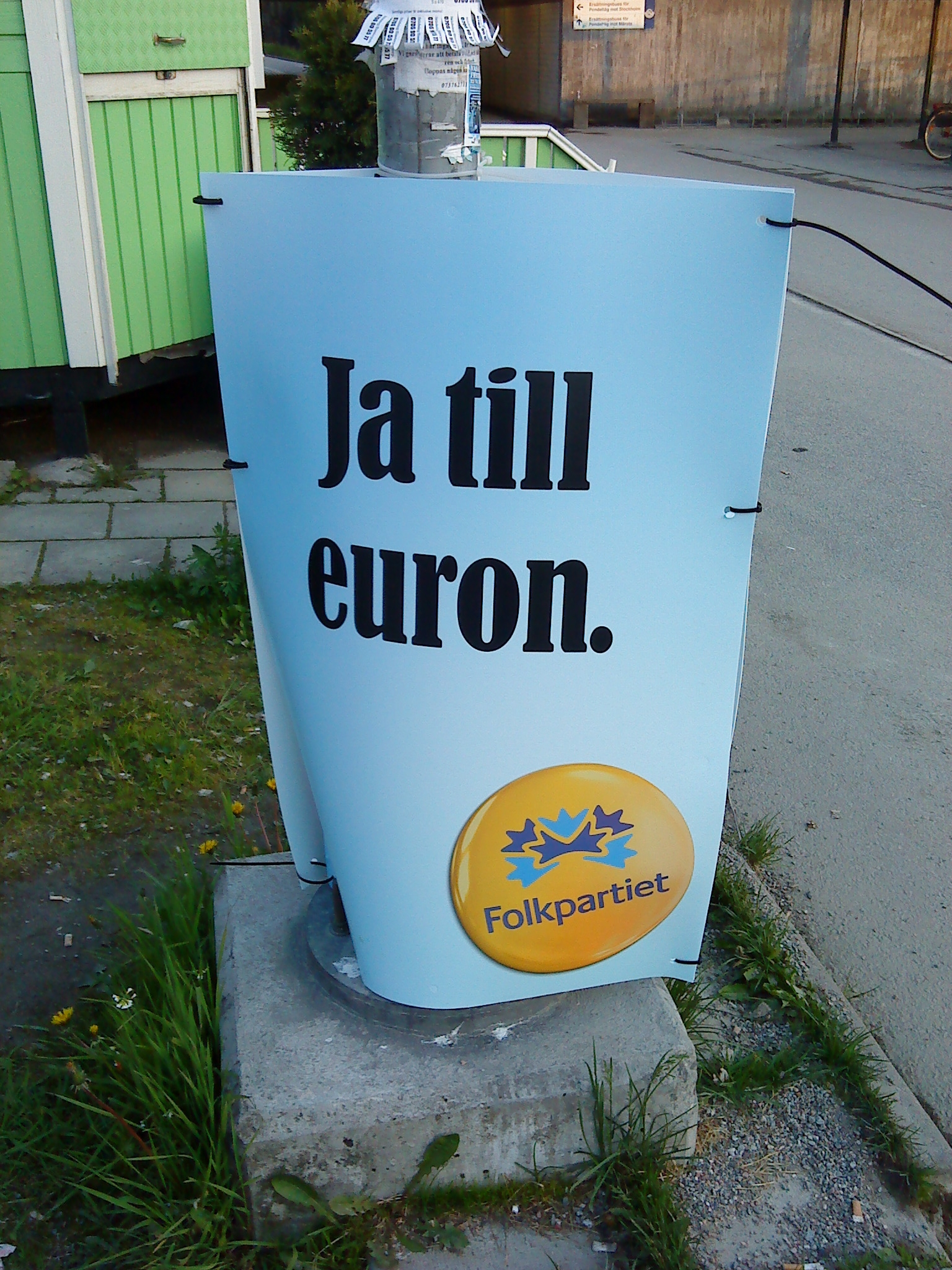
Yes to the euro slogan: part of the 2009 European Parliament election campaign.

During the election campaign for the 2009 European Parliament elections, the Liberal People's Party and Christian Democrats expressed interest in holding a second referendum on euro adoption. However, the Moderate Party and Centre Party thought that the time was ill-chosen.

=== 2014 European elections ===
During the election campaign for the 2014 European Parliament elections, the Moderate Party continued its support for euro adoption, but with no new referendum envisioned until there was stable support in favour in opinion polls.

=== Growing support since 2023 ===
As a result of an increase in support in recent opinion polls and the twentieth anniversary of the first euro referendum in Sweden, the question about organizing a second euro referendum received renewed attention in September 2023; although only one of the Swedish parliamentary parties (the Liberals) opted to push for introducing the euro as swiftly as possible, while the Centre Party opted to open up an investigation into the pros and cons. In October 2025 the governing Moderate Party expressed interest in, once again, investigating euro adoption in Sweden. The party stated that a new investigation should pay greater attention to the geopolitical implications of joining the eurozone Minister of finance Elisabeth Svantesson later stated that euro adoption would not happen in the near future. The Christian Democrats have also welcomed a renewed investigation of the pros and cons of euro adoption.

In January 2026, Svantesson announced that the Moderate Party would appoint a commission to weigh the pros and cons of joining the euro if the party remains in power after the September parliamentary election.

== Economic research ==
A 2009 economic study from J. James Reade (Oxford) and Ulrich Volz (German Development Institute) on the possible entry of Sweden in the eurozone has found that it would be likely to have a positive effect. The study of the evolution of the Swedish money market rates shows that they closely follow the euro rates, even during times of economic crisis. This shows that Sweden would not lose in terms of monetary policy autonomy, as the Swedish Central Bank already closely follows the rates set by the European Central Bank. When adopting the euro, Sweden would swap this autonomy on paper for a real influence on the European monetary policy thanks to the gaining of a seat in the ECB's governing council. Overall, the study concludes that "staying outside of the eurozone implies forgone benefits that Sweden, a small open economy with a sizable and internationally exposed financial sector, would enjoy from adopting an international currency."

== Opinion polls ==
Former Prime Minister Fredrik Reinfeldt stated in December 2007 that there would be no new referendum until there was stable support for "yes" in the polls.

From 2004–2009, polls generally showed stable support for the "no" alternative, except for a few polls in 2009 which showed a narrow lead for "yes". Strong support for "no" existed from 2010–2014, e.g., with 73% opposing and only 23% supporting euro introduction in a November 2014 poll. According to Eurobarometer polls, the numbers of Swedes favouring adoption of the euro in Sweden grew to 32% in April 2015, 45% in April 2022 and 54% in April 2023.

=== Results ===
Polls on the question whether Sweden should abolish the krona and join the euro are regularly carried out, usually by the state statistics agency Statistics Sweden (SCB). The results are always published in the press or online.

Pollster	Dates conducted	Dates published	Sample size	Yes	No	Unsure
SCB	May 2004	18 Jun 2004	7,046	37.8%	50.9%	11.3%
SCB	Nov 2004	15 Dec 2004	6,919	37.3%	48.6%	14.3%
SCB	May 2005	21 Jun 2005	6,985	39.4%	46.4%	14.2%
SCB	Nov 2005	20 Dec 2005	6,980	36.1%	49.4%	14.5%
SCB	May 2006	20 Jun 2006	6,870	38.1%	48.7%	13.2%
SCB	Nov 2006	19 Dec 2006	7,012	34.7%	51.5%	13.8%
Skop	?	24 Mar 2007	?	37%	60%	3%
SCB	May 2007	19 Jun 2007	6,932	33.3%	53.8%	13%
SCB	Nov 2007	18 Dec 2007	6,922	35.0%	50.8%	14.2%
SCB	May 2008	17 Jun 2008	6,817	34.6%	51.7%	13.7%
SCB	Nov 2008	16 Dec 2008	6,687	37.5%	47.5%	15%
SCB	?	Dec 2008	1,006	44%	48%	7%
Skop	?	1 Mar 2009	?	45%	51%	4%
Sifo	?	19 Apr 2009	?	47%	45%	8%
Novus Opinion	?	12 May 2009	1,000	51%	49%	0%
Novus Opinion	?	25 May 2009	1,000	47%	44%	9%
SCB	May 2009	23 Jun 2009	6,506	42.1%	42.9%	15.1%
SCB	Nov 2009	15 Dec 2009	6,398	43.8%	42.0%	14.2%
Demoskop	?	9 Apr 2010	1,004	37%	55%	8%
SCB	May 2010	15 Jun 2010	6,135	27.8%	60%	12.2%
SCB	Nov 2010	14 Dec 2010	6,192	28.9%	58.2%	12.9%
SCB	May 2011	15 Jun 2011	6,147	24.1%	63.7%	12.2%
SCB	Nov 2011	13 Dec 2011	5,907	11.2%	80.4%	8.4%
SCB	May 2012	11 Jun 2012	5,473	13.6%	77.7%	8.7%
SCB	Nov 2012	12 Dec 2012	5,479	9.6%	82.3%	8.0%
SCB	May 2013	11 Jun 2013	5,098	10.9%	81.4%	7.7%
SCB	Nov 2013	11 Dec 2013	5,267	12.6%	78.3%	9.2%
SCB	May 2014	10 Jun 2014	4,757	13.1%	77.4%	9.6%
Eurobarometer	Jun 2014	Jul 2014	?	19%	77%	4%
SCB	Nov 2014	10 Dec 2014	5,072	13.2%	76.9%	10.0%
Eurobarometer	Nov 2014	Dec 2014	?	23%	73%	4%
Eurobarometer	Apr 2015	19 May 2015	1,001	32.1%	65.6%	2.3%
SCB	May 2015	11 Jun 2015	6,067	15.3%	74.9%	9.7%
SCB	Nov 2015	9 Apr 2015	4,972	14.0%	75.5%	10.5%
Eurobarometer	Apr 2016	May 2016	1,000	29.9%	67,6%	2.5%
SCB	May 2016	3 Jun 2016	4,838	15.0%	74.1%	10.9%
SCB	Nov 2016	6 Dec 2016	5,021	15.8%	72.0%	12.2%
Eurobarometer	Apr 2017	May 2017	1,001	35.1%	62.2%	2.6%
SCB	May 2017	7 Jun 2017	4,808	16.5%	70.6%	12.9%
SCB	Nov 2017	8 Dec 2017	4,715	17.1%	69.9%	13.0%
Eurobarometer	Apr 2018	May 2018	1,001	40%	56%	4%
SCB	May 2018	11 Jun 2018	4,632	20.1%	66.0%	14.0%
SCB	Nov 2018	7 Dec 2018	4,721	18.6%	68.0%	13.4%
Eurobarometer	Apr 2019	Jun 2019	1,000	36%	60%	4%
SCB	May 2019	11 Jun 2019	4,506	19.3%	66.0%	14.7%
SCB	Nov 2019	10 Dec 2019	4,645	21.4%	62.5%	16.0%
Eurobarometer	May 2020	Jul 2020	1,003	35%	63%	3%
SCB	May 2020	11 Jun 2020	4,888	20.3%	64.3%	15.4%
SCB	Nov 2020	8 Dec 2020	4,692	19.2%	64.3%	16.5%
Eurobarometer	May 2021	Jul 2021	1016	42%	56%	2%
SCB	May 2021	8 Jun 2021	4,656	20.4%	63.2%	16.5%
SCB	Nov 2021	8 Dec 2021	4,319	20.6%	63.5%	15.8%
Eurobarometer	Apr 2022	Jul 2022	1,039	45%	52%	3%
SCB	May 2022	8 Jun 2022	4,274	22.6%	58.1%	19.3%
SCB	Nov 2022	7 Dec 2022	4,070	23.2%	58.5%	18.3%
Eurobarometer	Apr 2023	Jun 2023	1,039	54%	43%	2%
SCB	May 2023	7 Jun 2023	4,334	30.6%	50.5%	18.9%
Eurobarometer	May 2024	Jun 2024	1,038	55%	43%	2%
SCB	May 2024	13 Jun 2024	4,427	34.4%	46.1%	19.5%
SOM	December 2024	13 March 2025	?	32%	41%	27%
Eurobarometer	March 2025	June 2025	1,027	54%	35%	11%
SCB	May 2025	11 Jun 2025	4,595	32%	49.5%	18.5%
Eurobarometer	April 2026	1 Jun 2026	1,000	51%	47%	2%
SCB	Apr–May 2026	10 Jun 2026	4,542	28.7%	52.1%	19.2%

- SCB polling question: If a referendum were held today to replace the Swedish krona as a currency, would you vote "yes" or "no" with regard to introducing the euro as Sweden's currency? Swedish: Om vi idag skulle ha folkomröstning om att ersätta kronan som valuta, skulle du då rösta Ja eller Nej till att inför euron som valuta i Sverige?
- Eurobarometer question: Generally speaking, are you personally more in favour or against the idea of introducing the euro in Sweden?

Public support for introducing the euro in Sweden according to Eurobarometer polls

==== Critique of polling questions ====
How the polling questions are phrased has a major impact on how people respond. The SCB polling question tends to measure if the electorate favor voting yes/no for Sweden to adopt the euro as soon as possible. However, polls conducted by TNS Polska in Poland showed that this question finds a large group of supporters of euro adoption would vote no to adopting the euro as soon as possible, but that a majority of them would vote yes if asked whether or not the state should adopt the euro ten years from now.

== Swedish euro coins ==
There are no designs for potential Swedish euro coins. It was reported in the media that when Sweden changed the design of the 1-krona coin in 2001 it was in preparation for the euro. A newer portrait of the king was introduced. The 10-kronor coin already had a similar portrait. This in fact is from a progress report by the Riksbank on possible Swedish entry into the euro, which states that the lead in time for coin changeover could be reduced through using the portrait of King Carl XVI Gustaf introduced on the 1- and 10-kronor coins in 2001 as the national side on Swedish 1- and 2 euro coins.

Only the national bank can issue legal tender coins according to Swedish law. Some private collection mint companies have produced Swedish euro coins, claiming that they are copies of test coins made by the Riksbank.

== Membership of the European Central Bank's Banking Union ==
Since the rise in resolution fund fees for Swedish banks to protect against banking failures in 2017, resulting in the move of the headquarters of the biggest bank in Sweden and the entire Nordic region, Nordea, from Stockholm to the Finnish capital Helsinki, which lies within the eurozone and therefore also within the European Central Bank's Banking Union, there has been discussion about Sweden joining the banking union. Nordea's chairman of the board, Björn Wahlroos, stated that the bank wanted to put itself "on a par with its European peers" in justifying the relocation from Stockholm to Helsinki.

The main aim for joining the Banking Union is to protect Swedish banks against being "too big to fail". Sweden's Financial Markets Minister Per Bolund has said that the country is conducting a study on joining, which is planned to be completed by 2019. Critics argue that Sweden will be disadvantaged by joining the banking union because it does not have any voting rights, as it is not a member of the eurozone. Swedish former Finance Minister and former Prime Minister Magdalena Andersson stated: "You can't ignore the fact that the decision-making can be a little problematic for countries not in the eurozone."

== See also ==
- Economy of Sweden
  - § Economic and Monetary Union
  - § Trade unions
- Enlargement of the eurozone
- Sweden in the European Union
