= Yugoslav dinar in Serbia and Montenegro =

Dinar
jugoslavenski dinar (Serbo-Croatian); југословенски динар (Serbo-Croatian)

ISO 4217
- Code: YUM

Units of account
- Plural: The language(s) of this currency belong(s) to the Slavic languages. There is more than one way to construct plural forms.
- Symbol: din. / дин.
- Subunit
- 1/100: para / пара

Denominations
- Banknotes: 1, 5, 10, 20, 50, 100, 200, 1000, 5000 dinara
- Coins: 1, 5, 10, 50 para, 1, 2, 5 dinara

Demographics
- Replaced: Yugoslav dinar
- Official user(s): None, previously: FR Yugoslavia (Serbia 1992–2006, Montenegro 1992–2000); Serbia (2006)
- Unofficial users: None, previously: Republika Srpska; Republic of Serbian Krajina; Eastern Slavonia (Note: Under the United Nations Transitional Administration for Eastern Slavonia, Baranja and Western Sirmium (UNTAES) between 1995–1998, in parallel with the Croatian Kuna and Deutsche Mark.)

Issuance
- Central bank: National Bank of Yugoslavia in Serbia and Montenegro
- This infobox shows the latest status before this currency was rendered obsolete.

The dinar (Serbo-Croatian Cyrillic: динар) was the currency of the Federal Republic of Yugoslavia or Serbia and Montenegro, one of the successor states of Yugoslavia and the Yugoslav dinar. The dinar was subdivided into 100 para (Serbo-Croatian Cyrillic: пара).

== History ==
One of the successor states to former Yugoslavia, the Federal Republic of Yugoslavia, continued to use the name dinar for its currency until 2003, though Montenegro stopped exclusively using it in 1999 and moved away from it in 2000.

In the early 1990s, economic mismanagement made the government bankrupt and forced it to take money from the savings of the country's citizens. Following the breakup of Yugoslavia, this caused severe and prolonged hyperinflation in the Federal Republic of Yugoslavia, which has been described as the worst in history. Large amounts of money were printed, with coins becoming redundant and inflation rates reaching over one billion per cent per year. This hyperinflation caused five revaluations between 1990 and 1994, only some of which were given distinguishing names and separate ISO 4217 codes. The highest denomination banknote was 500 billion dinars, which became worthless a fortnight after it was printed.

=== July 1992 – September 1993: Reformed dinar (YUR) ===
In the Federal Republic of Yugoslavia, which consisted of the former Yugoslav republics of Serbia and Montenegro, a revaluation took place on 1 July 1992, at a ratio of 10 to 1. Hyperinflation in the country began during this currency's period of circulation. The sanctions against the Federal Republic of Yugoslavia, instituted over the course of 1992, seriously impacted its economy. People started to use foreign hard currency, such as Deutsche Marks, to mitigate some of the problems of hyperinflation.

=== October–December 1993 dinar (YUO) ===
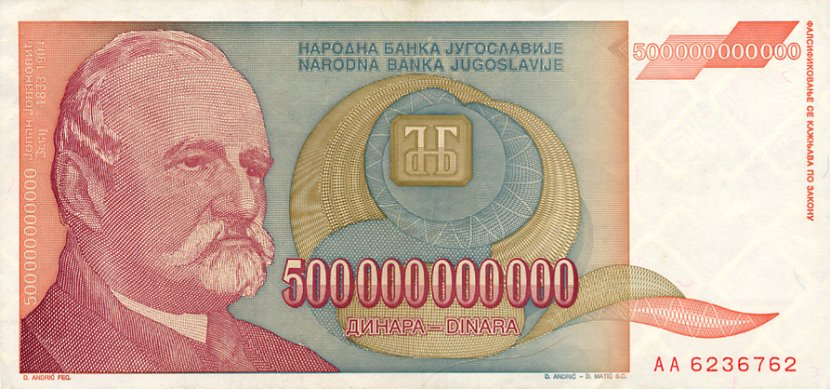

Yugoslavia re-denominated the dinar for the fourth time on 1 October 1993, at a ratio of 1 million to 1. This did not mitigate the hyperinflation, and the 1993 dinar (ISO 4217 code: YUO) lasted for only three months.

Coinage became redundant. The 1993 dinar had the largest denomination out of all incarnations of Yugoslav currency: the banknote featuring Jovan Jovanović Zmaj had a face value of 500 billion (5×10^{11}) dinara (pictured). Wages became worthless; if paid in cash, workers had to rush out and spend their wages before they lost their value overnight. Many businesses started to pay wages in goods instead, and a simple barter system developed. Businesses with good connections to politicians could still get access to hard currency. Some shops, instead of rewriting their prices several times a day, started pricing goods in "bods" (points), often equivalent to hard currency such as one Deutschmark. The winter of 1993 was particularly hard for pensioners; if a monthly pension was spent immediately, it was still barely enough to buy three litres of milk. Many people relied on connections to friends and family abroad (who could provide hard currency) or in the countryside (who could grow food).

=== 1994 dinar (YUG) ===
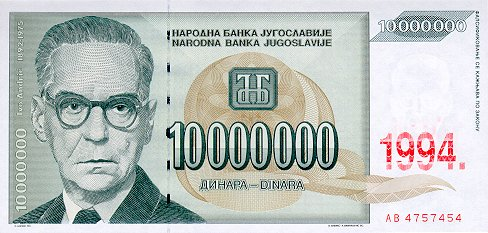
10 million dinara

Yugoslavia re-denominated the dinar for the fifth time on 1 January 1994, at a ratio of 1 billion (10^{9}) to 1.

The 1994 dinar (ISO 4217 code: YUG) was the shortest-lived out of all incarnations of Yugoslav currency, as hyperinflation continued to intensify, and only one coin (1 dinar) was issued for it. Towards the end of the 1994 dinar, the National Bank overprinted and reissued 10 million dinara banknotes from the 1992 dinar (right).

=== 1994–2003: Novi dinar (YUM) ===
Revaluations of the Yugoslav dinar
Date	Conversion Rate
1 July 1992	10
1 October 1993	1,000,000
1 January 1994	1,000,000,000
24 January 1994	~13 million

On 24 January 1994, the novi dinar (nominative plural: novi dinari, Cyrillic script: нови динар, нови динари; genitive plural: novih dinara, Cyrillic: нових динара; novi means new) was introduced. This was not merely a revaluation of the dinar. Instead, the novi dinar was pegged at par to the Deutsche Mark. On the day of the introduction of the novi dinar, the exchange rate of the previous dinar to the Deutsche Mark, and, hence, to the novi dinar, was approximately 1 DM or 13 million dinara. Despite not being pegged to the newest currency, the previous dinar did not fall further in value, remaining at about 12 million "1994" dinar to the novi dinar. However, the currency experienced two devaluations: on 26 November 1995 (to 3.30 dinars per mark) and on 1 April 1998 (to 6 dinars per mark). The overall impact of the hyperinflation was that 1 novi dinar equalled approximately 1.2×10^{27} third (hard) dinara from before 1990, 1.2×10^{29} Federation dinara, or 2.4 ×10^{30} pre-war dinara. The "novi" portion of the name was abandoned in 2000.

In 2003, as Yugoslavia became the State Union of Serbia and Montenegro, the Yugoslav dinar in the constituent Republic of Serbia was replaced by the Serbian dinar (CSD) at par.

=== Replacement of the dinar ===
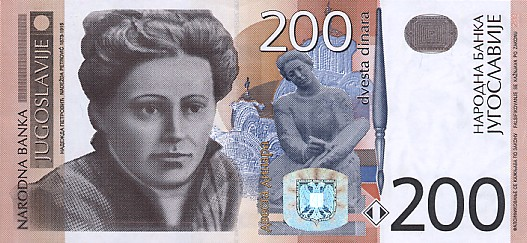
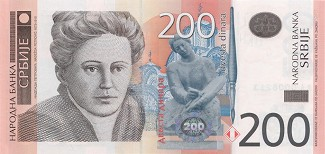
200 Yugoslav dinara and 200 Serbian dinara at the time of introduction of the Serbian dinar

On 6 November 1999, Montenegro decided that, besides the Yugoslav dinar, the Deutsche Mark would also be an official currency. On 13 November 2000, the dinar was dropped in Montenegro and the Deutsche Mark (by that time defined in terms of the euro) became the only currency there. Deutsche Mark ceased to be a legal tender in Germany and was physically replaced by the euro on 1 January 2002, which is also when Montenegro unilaterally adopted the euro, though it does not mint it.

In 2003, after the creation of Serbia and Montenegro, the dinar, by then only used in Serbia, was replaced by the Serbian dinar. In practice, the introduction of the Serbian dinar functioned as a name change with their values being at par and maintaining essentially the same banknote and coin designs except for the name of the state. Old Yugoslav banknotes remained in official use in parallel with the new Serbian notes until 1 January 2007, and old banknotes could be exchanged for new ones with services provided by the National Bank of Serbia until the end of 2012.

== Coins ==
=== 1992 dinar ===
Coins were issued for this currency in 1992 in denominations of 1, 2, 5, 10 and 50 dinara. The 1, 2 and 5 dinara were bronze, whilst the 10 and 50 dinara were nickel-brass. The coins bore the state title "Yugoslavia" (Jugoslavija in the Latin alphabet and Југославија in Cyrillic) in its simplest form without any modifier.

=== 1993 dinar ===
Coins were issued in 1993 in denominations of 1, 2, 5, 10 and 50 dinara struck in nickel-brass, and 100 dinara struck in brass. Brass 500 dinara coins were also struck but not issued, most being remelted. The design of these coins was similar to that of coins of the fifth dinar, except that the sixth dinar coins bore the state title "FR Yugoslavia" (SR Jugoslavija in Latin and СР Југославија in Cyrillic).

=== 1994 dinar ===
Only one coin type was struck for this short-lived currency, a brass 1 dinar.

=== Novi dinar ===
In 1994, brass 1 and 5 para, and nickel-brass 10 and 50 para, and 1 novi dinar were introduced. In 2000 the word novi was dropped from the currency and new, brass 50 para, 1, 2 and 5 dinara coins were introduced.
