= Hyperinflation in Serbia and Montenegro =

Hyperinflation between March 1992 and January 1994

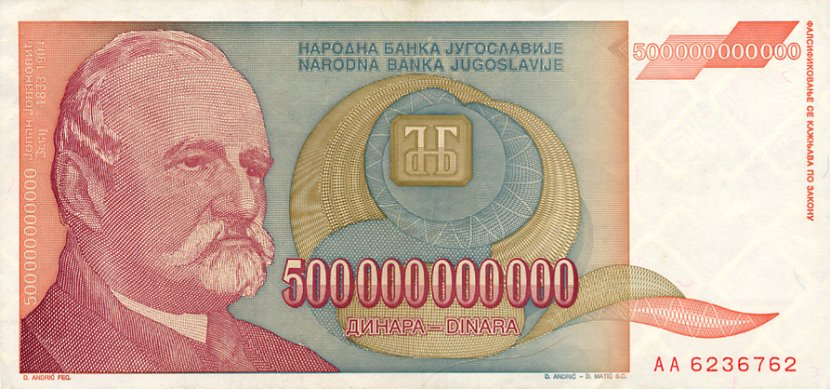
A 500 billion dinar banknote, which was the largest denomination banknote printed in FR Yugoslavia.

Between 1992 and 1994, Serbia and Montenegro experienced the second-longest period of hyperinflation in world economic history after 1920s Russia, (Note: Some sources have the 1940s Greek hyperinflation lasting from 1941 to 1946; however, Cagan’s criteria has it lasting only thirteen months in 1943 and 1944.) caused by an explosive growth in the money supply of the economy of FR Yugoslavia during the Yugoslav Wars. This period spanned 22 months, from March 1992 to January 1994. Inflation peaked at a monthly rate of 313 million percent in January 1994. Daily inflation was 62%, with an inflation rate of 2.03% per hour – higher than the annual inflation rate of many developed countries. The inflation rate in January 1994, converted to annual levels, reached 116,545,906,563,330% (116.546 trillion percent, or 1.16 × 10^{14} percent). During this period of hyperinflation in FR Yugoslavia, store prices were given in points, with each point equal to the Deutsche Mark. The conversion was made either in Deutsche Marks or in dinars at the current black market exchange rate that often changed several times per day.

== Stabilization program ==
Hyperinflation in the Socialist Federal Republic of Yugoslavia was managed with a heterodox stabilization program. When the Federal Republic of Yugoslavia (FRY) was established, an orthodox program was implemented instead. Both were relatively successful in the short term but failed in the long term, leading to their collapse.

At the beginning of 1994, another stabilization program – Monetary Reconstruction Program and Economic Recovery – came into effect. The program was led by Dr. Dragoslav Avramović and became known as the "Avramović Program")

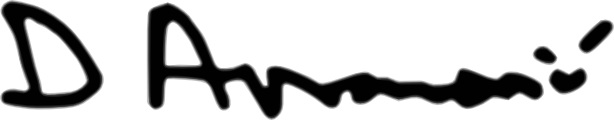
Dragoslav Avramović's signature

This program had to deal with the third-worst hyperinflation in world economic history, lasting 22 months (Note: March 1992 to January 1994) with a peak monthly inflation rate (Note: January 1994) of 313,563,558%. This hyperinflation resulted in a drastic deterioration of all important economic indicators. 1993 saw a 30% decline in GDP, a decrease in investments and industrial production by 37%, and unemployment by 24.1%. Simultaneously, there was a huge budget deficit.

Public revenues declined rapidly, driven by a shrinking tax base caused by reduced economic activity, sanctions on the Federal Republic of Yugoslavia, and a sharp rise in the "grey economy." As a result, much of the already diminished human resources remained untapped. At the same time, public expenditures rose significantly, fueled by increased social benefits in response to worsening economic conditions, economic and military support for insurgent Serbian groups in Bosnia and Croatia, the outbreak of the Bosnian and Croatian wars of independence, refugee assistance, and other related factors.

The budget deficit was largely financed from the primary issue, and this monetization of the budget deficit was the main cause of hyperinflation. Accordingly, the main measures of Avramović's program was primarily related to the monetary and fiscal measures, making it an orthodox stabilization program. The stabilization program should, above all, result in:

1. breaking the hyperinflation and returning the lost money function to the dinar
2. enabling fast and stable economic growth
3. a significant increase in wages (drastically depreciated during the period of hyperinflation) and establishing a safety net
4. an essential reform of the economic system, especially in the financial sphere.

At the same time, it was essential to create conditions for the prompt abolition of international sanctions and to reopen the economy to foreign markets, without which the Program could not be fully implemented. Since it had become evident that lifting international economic sanctions could not be implemented in the near future, the decision was made to begin developing and implementing a stabilization program to be carried out in two phases.

The first, short-term phase envisaged monetary reconstruction and anti-inflationary measures aimed at breaking down hyperinflation. It was supposed to be realized in the first 6 months under conditions of economic sanctions by the international community. The second, long-term phase envisioned essential economic reforms that (while preserving the stability achieved in the first phase) would lead to the economic recovery of the country. This would ensure long-term stable economic growth with an optimal employment rate and the improvement of the standard of living.

This phase, as the authors of the Program have pointed out, assumed the abolition of economic sanctions and the flow of "fresh" capital . Since sanctions were not lifted, this second phase had no chance of significant success, as was the case with the first phase of the Program. Therefore, we will only detail the first stage of the Avramović program. The first phase of the Monetary Reconstruction Program had no aid or capital inflows, with initial foreign exchange reserves amounting to about 300 million German marks.

The Monetary Reconstruction Program focused on monetary policy, monetary reforms, and fiscal policy. Life in the country after the implementation of the stabilization program began to slowly return to normal. However, it is important to point out that in these two years, because of the gray money issue 4.7 billion DEM from the citizens were bought (according to the estimates of economists from that period).

The National Bank of Yugoslavia issued 33 banknotes during the stated hyperinflation period, of which 24 were issued in 1993. Yugoslav hyperinflation lasted for 24 months, which is longer than the German hyperinflation after World War I, which lasted 16 months, the Greek hyperinflation, which lasted 13 months, and the Hungarian hyperinflation, which lasted 12 months.

== In popular culture ==
- A Diary of Insults (1994)
- The Wounds (1998)
- Three Palms for Two Punks and a Babe (1998)
- Celts (2021)
