= Kurtuluş (disambiguation) =

Kurtuluş is a neighbourhood of Istanbul, Turkey.

Kurtuluş may also refer to:

- Kurtuluş (surname)
- Kurtuluş, Kuyucak, a town in Kuyucak district of Aydın Province, Turkey
- Kurtuluş, Mut, a village in Mut, Mersin Province, Turkey
- Kurtuluş, Seyhan, a mahalle in Seyhan, Adana Province, Turkey
- Kurtuluş, Silifke, a village in Silifke, Mersin Province, Turkey
- Kurtuluş, a village in Northern Cyprus
- Kurtuluş SK, a football club in Istanbul
- SS Kurtuluş, a Turkish freighter ship
- Kurtuluş: The Steamship That Carried Peace, a 2006 Turkish documentary film about the SS Kurtuluş
