= List of Fenerbahçe S.K. presidents =

This is a list of all presidents of Fenerbahçe, including their occupation.

== Presidents ==
Below is the official presidential history of Fenerbahçe until the present day.

Fenerbahçe Presidents
| Name (Note: Fenerbahçe have had numerous presidents over the course of their history, some of which have been the owners of the club, others have been honorary presidents.) | From | To | Honours (total number) |
|---|---|---|---|
| Ziya Songülen | 1907 | 1908 | |
| Ayetullah Bey | 1908 | 1909 | |
| Tevfik Taşçı | 1909 | 1910 | |
| Hakkı Saffet Tarı | 1910 | 1910 | |
| Galip Kulaksızoğlu | 1910 | 1911 | |
| Şehzade Osman Fuad | 1911 | 1912 | Istanbul Football League (1) |
| Arif Emirzade | 1911 | 1912 | |
| Hamit Hüsnü Kayacan | 1912 | 1914 | Istanbul Football League (1) |
| Mehmet Hulusi Bey | 1914 | 1915 | Istanbul Football League (1) |
| Mehmet Sabri Toprak | 1915 | 1916 | |
| Nazım Bey | 1916 | 1918 | |
| Ahmet Nuri Sekizinci | 1918 | 1919 | |
| Şehzade Ömer Faruk | 1920 | 1923 | Istanbul Football League (2) |
| Mehmet Sabri Toprak | 1923 | 1924 | |
| Nasuhi Esat Baydar | 1924 | 1925 | Istanbul Men's Volleyball League (1) |
| Ali Naci Karacan | 1926 | 1927 | |
| Muvaffak Menemencioğlu | 1928 | 1932 | Istanbul Men's Volleyball League (3) |
| Sait Selahattin Cihanoğlu | 1932 | 1933 | Istanbul Men's Volleyball League (1) |
| Hayri Cemal Atamer | 1933 | 1934 | Istanbul Football League (1); Turkish Football Championship (1); Istanbul Men's Volleyball League (1) |
| Şükrü Saracoğlu | 1934 | 1950 | Turkish National Division (6); Istanbul Football League (6); Turkish Football Championship (2); Istanbul Cup (1); Prime Minister's Cup (3) |
| Ali Muhittin Hacı Bekir | 1950 | 1951 | Prime Minister's Cup (1) |
| Osman Kavrakoğlu | 1951 | 1953 | Istanbul Football League (1) |
| Bedii Yazıcı | 1953 | 1954 | |
| Zeki Rıza Sporel | 1955 | 1957 | Istanbul Football League (1); Turkish Basketball Championship (1); Istanbul Basketball League (3); Turkish Women's Basketball Championship (2); Istanbul Women's Basketball League (3); Turkish Women's Volleyball Championship (2); Istanbul Women's Volleyball League (2) |
| Agah Erozan | 1958 | 1959 | Istanbul Football League (1); Turkish Basketball Championship (1); Turkish Women's Basketball Championship (1); Istanbul Women's Basketball League (1); Turkish Women's Volleyball Championship (2); Istanbul Women's Volleyball League (2) |
| Medeni Berk | 1960 | 1960 | |
| Hasan Kamil Sporel | 1960 | 1961 | Süper Lig (1) Turkish Women's Volleyball Championship (1); Istanbul Women's Volleyball League (1) |
| Razi Trak | 1961 | 1962 | Süper Lig (1) |
| İsmet Uluğ | 1962 | 1966 | Süper Lig (2) Turkish Basketball Championship (1); Istanbul Basketball League (2) |
| Faruk Ilgaz | 1966 | 1974 | Süper Lig (4); Turkish Cup (2); Turkish Super Cup (2); Balkan Cup (1); Prime Minister's Cup (1); Turkish Basketball Cup (1); Istanbul Basketball League (1); Istanbul Men's Volleyball League (3); Turkish Women's Volleyball Championship (3); Istanbul Women's Volleyball League (5) |
| Emin Cankurtaran | 1974 | 1976 | Turkish Super Cup (1) |
| Faruk Ilgaz | 1976 | 1980 | Süper Lig (1); Turkish Cup (1); Prime Minister's Cup (1) |
| Razi Trak | 1980 | 1981 | |
| Ali Haydar Şen | 1981 | 1983 | Süper Lig (1); Turkish Cup (1); Prime Minister's Cup (1) |
| Faruk Ilgaz | 1983 | 1984 | |
| Fikret Arıcan | 1984 | 1986 | Süper Lig (1); Turkish Super Cup (1); Prime Minister's Cup (2) |
| Tahsin Kaya | 1986 | 1989 | Süper Lig (1) |
| Metin Aşık | 1989 | 1993 | Prime Minister's Cup (1); Basketbol Süper Ligi (1); Turkish Basketball Presidential Cup (3) |
| Güven Sazak | 1993 | 1994 | Turkish Basketball Presidential Cup (1) |
| Hasan Özaydın | 1994 | 1994 | |
| Ali Şen | 1994 | 1998 | Süper Lig (1); Turkish Super Cup (2) |
| Aziz Yıldırım | 1998 | 2018 | Süper Lig (6); Turkish Cup (2); Turkish Super Cup (3); Prime Minister's Cup (1); EuroLeague (1); Basketbol Süper Ligi (5); Turkish Basketball Cup (3); Turkish Basketball Presidential Cup (2); Women's Basketball Super League (11); Turkish Women's Basketball Cup (9); Turkish Women's Basketball Presidential Cup (10); Turkish Men's Volleyball League (4); Turkish Men's Volleyball Cup (2); Turkish Men's Volleyball Super Cup (2); CEV Challenge Cup (1); Men's Volleyball Balkan Cup (1); Turkish Women's Volleyball League (3); Turkish Women's Volleyball Cup (1); Turkish Women's Volleyball Super Cup (2); CEV Women's Champions League (1); Women's CEV Cup (1) |
| Ali Koç | 2018 | 2025 | Turkish Cup (1); Basketbol Süper Ligi (1); Women's Basketball Super League (3); Turkish Men's Volleyball League (1); Turkish Basketball Cup (2); Turkish Women's Basketball Cup (2); Turkish Men's Volleyball Cup (1); IWBF Challenge Cup (1); Turkish Wheelchair Basketball Super League (2); Turkish Men's Volleyball Super Cup (1); Turkish Women's Basketball Presidential Cup (1); EuroLeague Women (2) |
| Sadettin Saran | 2025 | 2026 | Turkish Super Cup (1); Turkish Women's Football Super League (1); Turkish Basketball Cup (1); EuroLeague Women (1); Women's Basketball Super League (1); Turkish Women's Basketball Presidential Cup (1); Turkish Women's Basketball Cup (1); EuroCup 1 (1); Turkish Women's Volleyball Super Cup (1) |
| Aziz Yıldırım | 2026 | | |
