= List of Turkish basketball champions =

Turkish basketball championships
- Founded: 1943
- Country: Turkey
- Number of teams: 16
- Level on pyramid: 1
- Current champions: Fenerbahçe (2025-26)
- Most championships: All-time: Galatasaray (18 titles); Süper Lig: Anadolu Efes (16 titles)

The Education Cup (Turkish: Maarif Kupası) was a top-level basketball championship competition in Turkey, that was run by the Turkish Training Community Alliance in 1943. In the 1944 season, the competition was replaced by the Spring Cup (Turkish: Bahar Kupası), that was run by the Turkish Training Community Alliance from 1944 to 1946. In the 1946 season, the competition was replaced by the Turkish Basketball Championship.

The Turkish Basketball Championship (Turkish: Türkiye Basketbol Şampiyonası) was a top-level basketball championship competition in Turkey, that was run by the Turkish Training Community Alliance & Turkish Basketball Federation, from 1946 to 1967. In the 1966–67 season, the competition was replaced by the Turkish Basketball Super League (BSL).

The Basketball Super League (Turkish: Basketbol Süper Ligi; BSL), also known as the ING Basketbol Süper Ligi for sponsorship reasons, is the top men's professional basketball division of the Turkish basketball league system. It replaced the former Turkish Basketball Championship (1946–1967) to become the Turkish Basketball League (TBL) until 2015 when it adopted its current name while the TBL name became exclusive to the second-tier and third-tier divisions.

== Title holders ==
Education Cup^{1}
- 1943 Harp Okulu

Spring Cup^{1}

- 1944 Galatasaray
- 1945 Galatasaray

Turkish Basketball Championship

- 1946 Beykoz
- 1947 Galatasaray
- 1948 Galatasaray
- 1949 Galatasaray
- 1950 Galatasaray
- 1951 Harp Okulu
- 1952 Harp Okulu
- 1953 Galatasaray
- 1954 Modaspor
- 1955 Galatasaray & Modaspor (Note: see the "1955 two domestic champions" section)
- 1956 Galatasaray
- 1957 Fenerbahçe
- 1958 Modaspor
- 1959 Fenerbahçe
- 1960 Galatasaray
- 1961 Darüşşafaka
- 1962 Darüşşafaka
- 1963 Galatasaray
- 1964 Galatasaray
- 1965 Fenerbahçe
- 1966 Galatasaray
- 1967 Altınordu (Note: see the "1967 Turkish Basketball Championship" section)

Basketball Super League

- 1966–67 Altınordu
- 1967–68 İTÜ
- 1968–69 Galatasaray
- 1969–70 İTÜ
- 1970–71 İTÜ
- 1971–72 İTÜ
- 1972–73 İTÜ
- 1973–74 Muhafızgücü
- 1974–75 Beşiktaş
- 1975–76 Eczacıbaşı
- 1976–77 Eczacıbaşı
- 1977–78 Eczacıbaşı
- 1978–79 Efes Pilsen
- 1979–80 Eczacıbaşı
- 1980–81 Eczacıbaşı
- 1981–82 Eczacıbaşı
- 1982–83 Efes Pilsen
- 1983–84 Efes Pilsen
- 1984–85 Galatasaray
- 1985–86 Galatasaray
- 1986–87 Karşıyaka
- 1987–88 Eczacıbaşı
- 1988–89 Eczacıbaşı
- 1989–90 Galatasaray
- 1990–91 Fenerbahçe
- 1991–92 Efes Pilsen
- 1992–93 Efes Pilsen
- 1993–94 Efes Pilsen
- 1994–95 Ülker
- 1995–96 Efes Pilsen
- 1996–97 Efes Pilsen
- 1997–98 Ülker
- 1998–99 Tofaş
- 1999–00 Tofaş
- 2000–01 Ülker
- 2001–02 Efes Pilsen
- 2002–03 Efes Pilsen
- 2003–04 Efes Pilsen
- 2004–05 Efes Pilsen
- 2005–06 Ülker
- 2006–07 Fenerbahçe Ülker
- 2007–08 Fenerbahçe Ülker
- 2008–09 Efes Pilsen
- 2009–10 Fenerbahçe Ülker
- 2010–11 Fenerbahçe Ülker
- 2011–12 Beşiktaş Milangaz
- 2012–13 Galatasaray Medical Park
- 2013–14 Fenerbahçe Ülker
- 2014–15 Pınar Karşıyaka
- 2015–16 Fenerbahçe

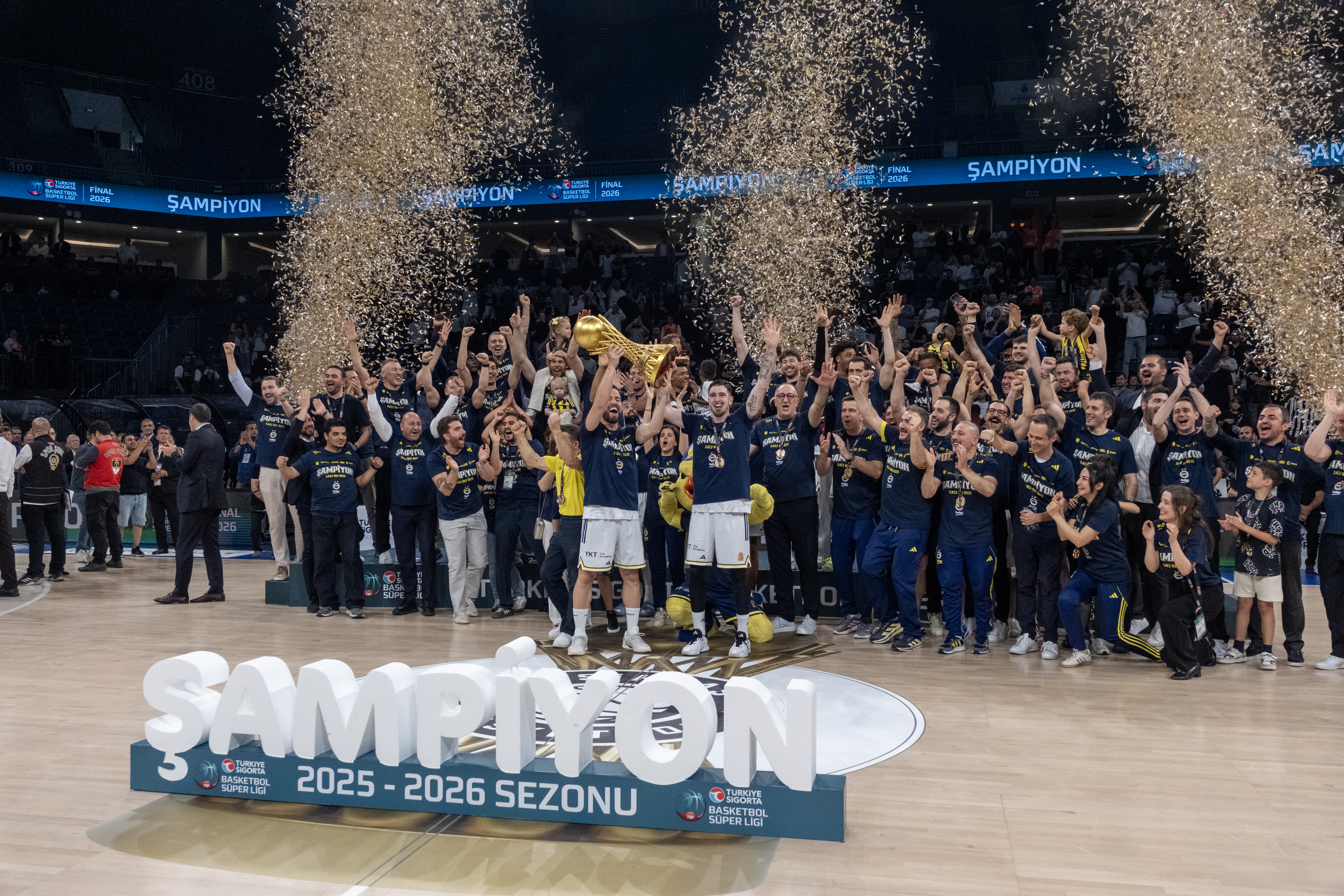
Fenerbahçe 2025–26 Basketbol Süper Ligi championship ceremony

- 2016–17 Fenerbahçe
- 2017–18 Fenerbahçe Doğuş
- 2018–19 Anadolu Efes
- 2019–20 Cancelled due to the COVID-19 pandemic.
- 2020–21 Anadolu Efes
- 2021–22 Fenerbahçe Beko
- 2022–23 Anadolu Efes
- 2023–24 Fenerbahçe Beko
- 2024–25 Fenerbahçe Beko
- 2025–26 Fenerbahçe Beko

- ^Note 1 – Education Cup (Turkish: Maarif Kupası) and Spring Cup (Turkish: Bahar Kupası) are considered as the early championship in Turkish Basketball Federation's own history book which named Türkiye Basketbol Tarihi.

== Performance by club ==
Clubs in bold currently play in the top division.

Club	Titles	Runners-up	Winning years
**Galatasaray**	**18**	9	1944, 1945, 1947, 1948, 1949, 1950, 1953, 1955, 1956, 1960, 1963, 1964, 1966, 1969, 1985, 1986, 1990, 2013
**Fenerbahçe**	**16**	16	1957, 1959, 1965, 1991, 2007, 2008, 2010, 2011, 2014, 2016, 2017, 2018, 2022, 2024, 2025, 2026
**Anadolu Efes**	**16**	14	1979, 1983, 1984, 1992, 1993, 1994, 1996, 1997, 2002, 2003, 2004, 2005, 2009, 2019, 2021, 2023
Eczacıbaşı	**8**	1	1976, 1977, 1978, 1980, 1981, 1982, 1988, 1989
İTÜ	**5**	4	1968, 1970, 1971, 1972, 1973
Ülker	**4**	5	1995, 1998, 2001, 2006
Harp Okulu	**3**	2	1943, 1951, 1952
Modaspor	**3**	1	1954, 1955, 1958
**Beşiktaş**	**2**	9	1975, 2012
**Tofaş**	**2**	3	1999, 2000
**Pınar Karşıyaka**	**2**	2	1987, 2015
Darüşşafaka	**2**	1	1961, 1962
Altınordu	**2**	—	1967, 1967
Beykoz	**1**	—	1946
Muhafızgücü	**1**	—	1974
Mülkiye	—	4	—
Şekerspor	—	2	—
Çukurova Sanayi	—	2	—
Paşabahçe	—	2	—
**Türk Telekom**	—	2	—
Beyoğluspor	—	1	—
Kurtuluş	—	1	—
Vefa	—	1	—
Bandırma	—	1	—

== 1955 two domestic champions ==
On April 25, 1955, the last game of the championship was Fenerbahçe against Galatasaray at Spor Sergi Sarayı. Galatasaray and Modaspor were in the championship race until the last game and they had the same number of points. Therefore, the last game was very important for both Galatasaray and Modaspor since the champion would be determined by total point difference. In the game against Galatasaray, Fenerbahçe officials withdrew their team from the match with just 44 seconds left to the end of the match due to Fenerbahçe being behind by 13 points, with no chance of turning the game. Thus the match could not be concluded. Nevertheless, the Federation of Sports declared that such behavior of the Fenerbahçe officials would not be acceptable and there were two domestic champions, Galatasaray and Modaspor, in that year. The trophy was split into two pieces and both clubs could keep these in their museums.

Final ranking

Pos.	Club	Pld	Pts	W	D	L	PF	PA	PD
1.	Galatasaray	5	9	4	0	1	302	222	+80
1.	Modaspor	5	9	4	0	1			
3.	Fenerbahçe	5	9	4	0	1	251	159	+92
4.	Ankaragücü	5	6	1	0	4	232	287	-55
5.	Altınordu	5	6	1	0	4			
6.	Harp Okulu	5	6	1	0	4	226	330	-104

Pos.=Position, Pld=Matches played, W=Matches won, D=Draws, L=Matches lost, PF=Points for, PA=Points against, PD=Points difference

== 1967 Turkish Basketball Championship ==
1967 season was the last season of Turkish Basketball Championship in Turkey before Basketball Super League. The tournament was organized by the Turkish Basketball Federation (TBF) to select a club that would represent Turkey in the 1967–68 FIBA European Champions Cup. The championship was played between champion of 1966-67 Basketball Super League Altınordu and winner of 1966-67 Turkish Basketball Cup Fenerbahçe. Altınordu won the championship by winning two matches against Fenerbahçe.
