= KK Olimpija in international competitions =

KK Olimpija history and statistics in FIBA Europe and Euroleague Basketball (company) competitions.

== European competitions ==
Record	Round	Opponent club			
1958 FIBA European Champions Cup 1st–tier
2–2	Qualifying round 2	(Turkey) Modaspor	74–67 (a)	86–45 (h)	
2–2	Qualifying round 3	(Bulgaria) Academic	80–81 (a)	64–80 (h)	
1959–60 FIBA European Champions Cup 1st–tier
2–2	2nd round	(Austria) Union Babenberg	84–83 (a)	100–51 (h)	
2–2	QF	(Soviet Union) Rīgas ASK	79–95 (h)	63–79 (a)	
1961–62 FIBA European Champions Cup 1st–tier
6–2	1st round	(Austria) Engelmann Wien	99–77 (a)	86–64 (h)	
6–2	2nd round	(West Germany) USC Heidelberg	95–81 (a)	97–58 (h)	
6–2	QF	(Belgium) Antwerpse	83–87 (a)	90–56 (h)	
6–2	SF	(Spain) Real Madrid	105–91 (h)	53–69 (a)	
1962–63 FIBA European Champions Cup 1st–tier
3–3	1st round	(Israel) Maccabi Tel Aviv	60–46 (a)	71–72 (h)	
3–3	2nd round	(France) Alsace Bagnolet	61–80 (a)	128–94 (h)	
3–3	QF	(Czechoslovakia) Spartak ZJŠ Brno	86–83 (h)	72–79 (a)	
1966–67 FIBA European Champions Cup 1st–tier
5–5	2nd round	(Netherlands) Herly Amsterdam	72–74 (a)	87–82 (h)	
5–5	QF	(France) ASVEL	87–78 (h)	59–72 (a)	
5–5	QF	(Italy) Simmenthal Milano	69–73 (a)	92–107 (h)	
5–5	QF	(Belgium) Racing Mechelen	76–70 (a)	101–80 (h)	
5–5	SF	(Spain) Real Madrid	86–88; March 29, Pabellón de la Ciudad Deportiva del Real Madrid, Madrid		
5–5	3rd place game	(Czechoslovakia) Slavia VŠ Praha	88–83; April 1, Pabellón de la Ciudad Deportiva del Real Madrid, Madrid		
1967–68 FIBA European Cup Winner's Cup 2nd–tier
2–2	2nd round	(Romania) Dinamo București	84–100 (a)	87–60 (h)	
2–2	QF	(Czechoslovakia) Slavia VŠ Praha	64–95 (a)	82–70 (h)	
1968–69 FIBA European Cup Winner's Cup 2nd–tier
5–3	1st round	(Turkey) Altınordu	70–57 (a)	79–66 (h)	
5–3	2nd round	(West Germany) Bayern Munich	101–81 (a)	94–46 (h)	
5–3	QF	(East Germany) Berlin 1893	101–73 (h)	90–91 (a)	
5–3	SF	(Czechoslovakia) Slavia VŠ Praha	76–83 (h)	61–82 (a)	
1970–71 FIBA European Champions Cup 1st–tier
4–4	1st round	(Netherlands) Fiat Stars	Fiat Stars withdrew without games		
4–4	2nd round	(Poland) Śląsk Wrocław	74–60 (a)	89–94 (h)	
4–4	QF	(France) Olympique Antibes	89–81 (h)	67–74 (a)	
4–4	QF	(Czechoslovakia) Slavia VŠ Praha	76–58 (h)	78–101 (a)	
4–4	QF	(Italy) Ignis Varese	68–85 (a)	73–71 (h)	
1973–74 FIBA Korać Cup 3rd–tier
5–4	1st round	(Switzerland) Union Neuchâtel	127–114 (a)	130–98 (h)	
5–4	2nd round	(Belgium) Maes Pils	90–85 (h)	101–96 (a)	
5–4	Top 12	(France) ASVEL	72–73 (h)	85–100 (a)	96–105 (a)
5–4	Top 12	(Italy) Innocenti Milano	89–100 (a)	83–59 (h)	
1978–79 FIBA Korać Cup 3rd–tier
5–3	2nd round	(Switzerland) Pully	117–74 (h)	125–106 (a)	
5–3	Top 16	(Israel) Hapoel Gvat/Yagur	81–84 (a)	89–77 (h)	
5–3	Top 16	(Spain) Cotonificio	82–94 (a)	119–94 (h)	
5–3	Top 16	(Belgium) Standard Liège	89–100 (h)	83–59 (a)	
1981–82 FIBA Korać Cup 3rd–tier
0–2	2nd round	(Italy) Acqua Fabia Rieti	82–86 (a)	75–77 (h)	
1982–83 FIBA European Cup Winner's Cup 2nd–tier
4–4	2nd round	Bye	ZZI Olimpija qualified without games		
4–4	QF	(Czechoslovakia) Inter Slovnaft	97–90 (h)	95–101 (a)	
4–4	QF	(France) ASVEL	92–89 (a)	95–117 (h)	
4–4	QF	(Hungary) Soproni MAFC	92–75 (a)	106–88 (h)	
4–4	SF	(Italy) Scavolini Pesaro	78–97 (a)	92–107 (h)	
1988–89 FIBA Korać Cup 3rd–tier
2–2	1st round	(Greece) Panionios	73–88 (a)	97–78 (h)	
2–2	2nd round	(Spain) Estudiantes Bosé	96–70 (h)	65–92 (a)	
1989–90 FIBA Korać Cup 3rd–tier
6–4	1st round	(Israel) Hapoel Galil Elyon	73–70 (a)	79–81 (h)	
6–4	2nd round	(Italy) Benetton Treviso	83–80 (a)	84–68 (h)	
6–4	Top 16	(Italy) Enimont Livorno	88–109 (a)	112–81 (h)	
6–4	Top 16	(Spain) CAI Zaragoza	81–79 (h)	85–97 (a)	
6–4	Top 16	(France) Pitch Cholet	87–103 (a)	95–84 (h)	
1990–91 FIBA Korać Cup 3rd–tier
3–1	1st round	(East Germany) Magdeburg	122–46 (a)	121–67 (h)	
3–1	2nd round	(Israel) Hapoel Tel Aviv	67–77 (a)	103–94 (h)	
1991–92 FIBA European Cup 2nd–tier
11–6	2nd round	(Soviet Union) VEF Rīga	89–81 (a)	77–75 (h)	
11–6	3rd round	(Switzerland) Vevey	114–86 (h)	87–88 (a)	
11–6	Top 12	(Portugal) Benfica	91–88 (h)	84–47 (a)	
11–6	Top 12	(Spain) Real Madrid	90–96 (a)	89–91 (h)	
11–6	Top 12	(Greece) Panionios	95–83 (h)	85–80 (a)	
11–6	Top 12	(France) Pau-Orthez	73–89 (a)	88–86 (h)	
11–6	Top 12	(Israel) Hapoel Galil Elyon	91–82 (h)	92–87 (a)	
11–6	SF	(Greece) PAOK	81–68 (h)	61–79 (a)	86–104 (a)
1992–93 FIBA European League 1st–tier
1–3	1st round	(Lithuania) Žalgiris	74–80 (a)	103–89 (h)	
1–3	2nd round	(Greece) Olympiacos	85–88 (h)	81–88 (a)	
1992–93 FIBA European Cup 2nd–tier
6–6	3rd round	(Switzerland) Pully	107–86 (h)	95–102 (a)	
6–6	Top 12	(Turkey) Efes Pilsen	52–69 (a)	77–75 (h)	
6–6	Top 12	(Israel) Hapoel Tel Aviv	78–77 (h)	92–89 (a)	
6–6	Top 12	(Latvia) ASK Brocēni	93–71 (h)	75–73 (a)	
6–6	Top 12	(Spain) NatWest Zaragoza	77–91 (a)	63–66 (h)	
6–6	Top 12	(Russia) CSKA Moscow	89–82 (a)	104–118 (h)	
1993–94 FIBA European League 1st–tier
2–2	1st round	(Russia) CSKA Moscow	65–88 (a)	89–62 (h)	
2–2	2nd round	(Portugal) Benfica	63–87 (a)	91–76 (h)	
1993–94 FIBA European Cup 2nd–tier
11–3	3rd round	Bye	Smelt Olimpija qualified without games		
11–3	Top 12	(North Macedonia) Rabotnički	89–77 (h)	80–66 (a)	
11–3	Top 12	(Turkey) Tofaş	103–90 (a)	87–78 (h)	
11–3	Top 12	(Spain) Taugrés	63–67 (a)	86–73 (h)	
11–3	Top 12	(Switzerland) Fidefinanz Bellinzona	77–62 (h)	53–50 (a)	
11–3	Top 12	Croatia Osiguranje	84–79 (a)	68–76 (h)	
11–3	SF	(Greece) Sato Aris	79–83 (a)	84–78 (h)	74–61 (h)
11–3	F	(Spain) Taugrés	91–81; March 15, Centre Intercommunal de Glace Malley, Lausanne		
1994–95 FIBA European League 1st–tier
4–12	2nd round	(Belgium) Maes-Flandria	85–61 (h)	63–75 (a)	
4–12	Top 16	(Spain) Real Madrid	61–66 (h)	72–74 (a)	
4–12	Top 16	(Portugal) Benfica	84–81 (a)	87–78 (h)	
4–12	Top 16	(Italy) Scavolini Pesaro	75–81 (a)	84–87 (h)	
4–12	Top 16	(Greece) PAOK Bravo	87–81 (h)	66–85 (a)	
4–12	Top 16	(Israel) Maccabi Tel Aviv	61–79 (a)	79–86 (h)	
4–12	Top 16	(Greece) Panathinaikos	62–65 (h)	66–79 (a)	
4–12	Top 16	(Russia) CSKA Moscow	80–94 (a)	85–88 (h)	
1995–96 FIBA European League 1st–tier
0–2	2nd round	(France) Pau-Orthez	71–96 (a)	75–97 (h)	
1995–96 FIBA European Cup 2nd–tier
4–8	3rd round	(Slovakia) Baník Cígeľ Prievidza	73–81 (a)	107–88 (h)	
4–8	Top 12	(Estonia) Kalev	74–72 (a)	84–91 (h)	
4–8	Top 12	(Greece) PAOK	67–77 (a)	66–86 (h)	
4–8	Top 12	(Russia) Dynamo Moscow	75–79 (h)	76–83 (a)	
4–8	Top 12	(Poland) Nobiles Włocławek	87–77 (h)	85–97 (a)	
4–8	Top 12	(Croatia) Zrinjevac	79–96 (a)	72–67 (h)	
1996–97 FIBA EuroLeague 1st–tier
15–9	1st round	(Greece) Panathinaikos	67–75 (a)	74–76 (h)	
15–9	1st round	(Germany) Bayer 04 Leverkusen	86–70 (h)	89–77 (a)	
15–9	1st round	(Spain) FC Barcelona	77–65 (h)	71–70 (a)	
15–9	1st round	(France) ASVEL	69–70 (a)	73–60 (h)	
15–9	1st round	Croatia Osiguranje	66–53 (a)	81–53 (h)	
15–9	2nd round	(Spain) Caja San Fernando	76–81 (a)	67–70 (h)	
15–9	2nd round	(France) Pau-Orthez	96–86 (h)	71–77 (a)	
15–9	2nd round	(Russia) Dynamo Moscow	76–64 (a)	80–72 (h)	
15–9	Top 16	(Croatia) Cibona	58–61 (a)	69–66 (h)	62–61 (a)
15–9	QF	(Italy) Stefanel Milano	90–94 (a)	73–69 (h)	77–61 (a)
15–9	SF	(Greece) Olympiacos	65–74; April 22, PalaEur, Rome		
15–9	3rd place game	(France) ASVEL	86–79; April 24, PalaEur, Rome		
1997–98 FIBA EuroLeague 1st–tier
8–10	1st round	(Croatia) Cibona	75–78 (a)	59–76 (h)	
8–10	1st round	(Greece) AEK	71–74 (h)	65–74 (a)	
8–10	1st round	(France) PSG Racing	69–66 (a)	60–49 (h)	
8–10	1st round	(Germany) Alba Berlin	78–72 (h)	74–82 (a)	
8–10	1st round	(Italy) Teamsystem Bologna	89–68 (h)	61–77 (a)	
8–10	2nd round	(Spain) FC Barcelona	92–60 (h)	65–84 (a)	
8–10	2nd round	(Italy) Kinder Bologna	62–72 (a)	76–60 (h)	
8–10	2nd round	(France) Pau-Orthez	71–68 (h)	77–76 (a)	
8–10	Top 16	(Italy) Benetton Treviso	79–81 (a)	61–70 (h)	– (a)
1998–99 FIBA EuroLeague 1st–tier
14–5	1st round	(Italy) Teamsystem Bologna	57–45 (h)	66–63 (a)	
14–5	1st round	(Spain) Real Madrid	76–84 (h)	68–67 (a)	
14–5	1st round	(Greece) PAOK	68–76 (a)	84–68 (h)	
14–5	1st round	(Russia) CSK VVS Samara	67–60 (a)	84–55 (h)	
14–5	1st round	(France) ASVEL	64–54 (h)	68–77 (a)	
14–5	2nd round	(Germany) Alba Berlin	75–57 (a)	66–59 (h)	
14–5	2nd round	(Croatia) Zadar	76–65 (h)	72–61 (a)	
14–5	2nd round	(Turkey) Ülker	71–61 (a)	80–62 (h)	
14–5	Top 16	(France) Pau-Orthez	72–63 (h)	57–74 (a)	57–64 (h)
1999–00 FIBA EuroLeague 1st–tier
13–9	1st round	(Spain) Real Madrid	73–63 (h)	74–76 (a)	
13–9	1st round	(Germany) Alba Berlin	74–69 (a)	78–83 (h)	
13–9	1st round	(Greece) Panathinaikos	80–100 (a)	71–86 (h)	
13–9	1st round	(Turkey) Tofaş	87–92 (h)	78–74 (a)	
13–9	1st round	(Lithuania) Žalgiris	85–84 (a)	76–64 (h)	
13–9	2nd round	(France) Cholet	77–67 (a)	69–55 (h)	
13–9	2nd round	(Greece) PAOK	69–63 (h)	74–70 (a)	
13–9	2nd round	(Federal Republic of Yugoslavia) Crvena zvezda	77–83 (a)	59–47 (h)	
13–9	Top 16	(Greece) Olympiacos	65–61 (h)	52–68 (a)	85–67 (h)
13–9	QF	(Spain) FC Barcelona	67–70 (a)	71–64 (h)	66–71 (a)
2000–01 Euroleague 1st–tier
9–6	Regular season	(Italy) Benetton Treviso	71–69 (a)	78–74 (h)	
9–6	Regular season	(Portugal) Ovarense Aerosoles	102–79 (h)	92–70 (a)	
9–6	Regular season	(Greece) Olympiacos	69–73 (h)	70–82 (a)	
9–6	Regular season	(Israel) Hapoel Jerusalem	88–76 (a)	95–68 (h)	
9–6	Regular season	(Spain) Real Madrid	88–79 (h)	70–82 (a)	
9–6	Top 16	(Greece) PAOK	64–75 (a)	85–77 (h)	73–69 (a)
9–6	QF	(Italy) Kinder Bologna	79–80 (a)	79–81 (h)	– (a)
2001–02 Euroleague 1st–tier
10–10	Regular season	(Greece) Peristeri	81–74 (h)	75–67 (a)	
10–10	Regular season	(United Kingdom) London Towers	91–58 (a)	73–40 (h)	
10–10	Regular season	(Lithuania) Žalgiris	87–66 (h)	81–70 (a)	
10–10	Regular season	(Turkey) Ülker	63–75 (a)	78–80 (h)	
10–10	Regular season	(Italy) Kinder Bologna	70–86 (a)	85–89 (h)	
10–10	Regular season	(Germany) Opel Skyliners	81–55 (h)	79–56 (a)	
10–10	Regular season	(Spain) FC Barcelona	61–81 (a)	80–74 (h)	
10–10	Top 16	(Greece) AEK	87–97 (a)	69–85 (h)	
10–10	Top 16	(Greece) Panathinaikos	67–85 (a)	72–79 (h)	
10–10	Top 16	(Greece) Olympiacos	66–75 (h)	89–85 (a)	
2002–03 Euroleague 1st–tier
12–8	Regular season	(Spain) Unicaja	77–70 (a)	83–82 (h)	
12–8	Regular season	(Spain) TAU Cerámica	72–76 (h)	79–86 (a)	
12–8	Regular season	(Serbia and Montenegro) Budućnost	83–71 (h)	100–81 (a)	
12–8	Regular season	(Lithuania) Žalgiris	81–73 (a)	76–55 (h)	
12–8	Regular season	(Israel) Maccabi Tel Aviv	81–76 (h)	60–69 (a)	
12–8	Regular season	(Italy) Montepaschi Siena	79–86 (a)	94–92 (h)	
12–8	Regular season	(Greece) Panathinaikos	77–70 (a)	63–65 (h)	
12–8	Top 16	(Greece) Olympiacos	72–74 (h)	61–73 (a)	
12–8	Top 16	(Spain) FC Barcelona	72–69 (h)	75–79 (a)	
12–8	Top 16	(France) ASVEL	78–77 (a)	87–66 (h)	
2003–04 Euroleague 1st–tier
7–13	Regular season	(Serbia and Montenegro) Partizan Mobtel	69–67 (h)	67–77 (a)	
7–13	Regular season	(France) Pau-Orthez	91–89 (a)	84–78 (h)	
7–13	Regular season	(Turkey) Ülker	82–91 (h)	63–68 (a)	
7–13	Regular season	(Spain) FC Barcelona	63–69 (h)	72–92 (a)	
7–13	Regular season	(Italy) Lottomatica Roma	79–80 (a)	87–68 (h)	
7–13	Regular season	(Greece) AEK	78–77 (h)	87–91 (a)	
7–13	Regular season	(Croatia) Cibona VIP	86–95 (a)	85–81 (h)	
7–13	Top 16	(Italy) Skipper Bologna	76–84 (a)	73–86 (h)	
7–13	Top 16	(Turkey) Efes Pilsen	68–57 (h)	58–68 (a)	
7–13	Top 16	(France) Pau-Orthez	77–83 (a)	86–90 (h)	
2004–05 Euroleague 1st–tier
6–8	Regular season	(Italy) Scavolini Pesaro	68–77 (a)	63–74 (h)	
6–8	Regular season	(Spain) Winterthur FC Barcelona	69–83 (h)	69–79 (a)	
6–8	Regular season	(Lithuania) Žalgiris	83–78 (a)	86–73 (h)	
6–8	Regular season	(Italy) Montepaschi Siena	79–74 (h)	70–74 (a)	
6–8	Regular season	(France) Adecco ASVEL	54–61 (a)	79–67 (h)	
6–8	Regular season	(Israel) Maccabi Tel Aviv	93–81 (h)	82–95 (a)	
6–8	Regular season	(Greece) AEK	75–76 (a)	70–66 (h)	
2005–06 Euroleague 1st–tier
5–9	Regular season	(Lithuania) Žalgiris	75–78 (h)	79–80 (a)	
5–9	Regular season	(Germany) CHP Bamberg	80–81 (a)	57–59 (h)	
5–9	Regular season	(Spain) TAU Cerámica	70–87 (h)	63–91 (a)	
5–9	Regular season	(France) Strasbourg	82–90 (a)	82–68 (h)	
5–9	Regular season	(Greece) AEK	81–72 (h)	77–68 (a)	
5–9	Regular season	(Italy) Climamio Bologna	87–80 (h)	65–68 (a)	
5–9	Regular season	(Italy) Benetton Treviso	66–81 (a)	95–77 (h)	
2006–07 Euroleague 1st–tier
5–9	Regular season	(Croatia) Cibona VIP	61–77 (a)	92–88 (h)	
5–9	Regular season	(Italy) Lottomatica Roma	83–72 (h)	74–84 (a)	
5–9	Regular season	(Greece) Panathinaikos	65–86 (h)	74–83 (a)	
5–9	Regular season	(Spain) Unicaja	55–62 (a)	87–59 (h)	
5–9	Regular season	(Serbia) Partizan	70–71 (h)	60–106 (a)	
5–9	Regular season	(Israel) Maccabi Tel Aviv	87–110 (a)	77–75 (h)	
5–9	Regular season	(Spain) DKV Joventut	67–69 (h)	86–82 (a)	
2007–08 Euroleague 1st–tier
4–10	Regular season	(Italy) Montepaschi Siena	52–80 (a)	80–86 (h)	
4–10	Regular season	(Greece) Olympiacos	87–78 (h)	80–113 (a)	
4–10	Regular season	(Russia) CSKA Moscow	74–72 (h)	57–74 (a)	
4–10	Regular season	(Lithuania) Žalgiris	72–91 (a)	74–83 (h)	
4–10	Regular season	(Spain) TAU Cerámica	78–92 (h)	74–89 (a)	
4–10	Regular season	(Italy) VidiVici Bologna	91–101 (a)	75–60 (h)	
4–10	Regular season	(Poland) Prokom Trefl Sopot	68–49 (h)	68–79 (a)	
2008–09 Euroleague 1st–tier
2–8	Regular season	(Spain) DKV Joventut	64–81 (a)	65–86 (h)	
2–8	Regular season	(Spain) TAU Cerámica	90–91 (h)	69–101 (a)	
2–8	Regular season	(Italy) Lottomatica Roma	67–78 (h)	69–74 (a)	
2–8	Regular season	(Turkey) Fenerbahçe Ülker	87–89 (a)	70–90 (h)	
2–8	Regular season	(Germany) Alba Berlin	77–69 (h)	67–59 (a)	
2009–10 Euroleague 1st–tier
1–9	Regular season	(Israel) Maccabi Tel Aviv	65–85 (a)	65–82 (h)	
1–9	Regular season	(Greece) Maroussi	75–81 (h)	62–74 (a)	
1–9	Regular season	(Spain) Caja Laboral	76–82 (h)	53–62 (a)	
1–9	Regular season	(Russia) CSKA Moscow	69–79 (a)	77–80 (h)	
1–9	Regular season	(Italy) Lottomatica Roma	87–70 (h)	48–69 (a)	
2010–11 Euroleague 1st–tier
7–9	Regular season	(Turkey) Efes Pilsen	95–90 (h)	78–84 (a)	
7–9	Regular season	(Italy) Armani Jeans Milano	76–72 (a)	82–75 (h)	
7–9	Regular season	(Greece) Panathinaikos	85–84 (h)	88–95 (a)	
7–9	Regular season	(Russia) CSKA Moscow	55–65 (a)	81–72 (h)	
7–9	Regular season	(Spain) Power Electronics Valencia	72–68 (h)	77–78 (a)	
7–9	Top 16	(Italy) Lottomatica Roma	64–63 (a)	76–87 (h)	
7–9	Top 16	(Spain) Regal FC Barcelona	67–68 (h)	58–76 (a)	
7–9	Top 16	(Israel) Maccabi Tel Aviv	67–104 (a)	65–83 (h)	
2011–12 Euroleague 1st–tier
1–9	Regular season	(Spain) FC Barcelona Regal	64–86 (h)	46–72 (a)	
1–9	Regular season	(Italy) Montepaschi Siena	57–79 (a)	57–63 (h)	
1–9	Regular season	(Poland) Asseco Prokom Gdynia	70–62 (h)	52–67 (a)	
1–9	Regular season	(Turkey) Galatasaray	70–79 (h)	59–80 (a)	
1–9	Regular season	(Russia) UNICS	51–81 (a)	63–76 (h)	
2012–13 Euroleague 1st–tier
3–7	Regular season	(Italy) Mapooro Cantù	84–71 (a)	81–79 (h)	
3–7	Regular season	(Turkey) Fenerbahçe Ülker	75–81 (h)	68–85 (a)	
3–7	Regular season	(Greece) Panathinaikos	67–85 (h)	72–80 (a)	
3–7	Regular season	(Russia) Khimki	65–75 (a)	74–72 (h)	
3–7	Regular season	(Spain) Real Madrid	76–89 (h)	60–91 (a)	
2013–14 Eurocup 2nd–tier
8–8	Regular season	(Italy) Cimberio Varese	67–59 (h)	83–82 (a)	
8–8	Regular season	(France) ASVEL	56–64 (a)	86–48 (h)	
8–8	Regular season	(Spain) Valencia	67–64 (h)	93–91 (a)	
8–8	Regular season	(Germany) ratiopharm Ulm	80–83 (a)	74–61 (h)	
8–8	Regular season	(France) Paris-Levallois	74–66 (h)	63–80 (a)	
8–8	Top 32	(Israel) Hapoel Migdal	66–69 (h)	77–86 (a)	
8–8	Top 32	(Ukraine) Budivelnyk	76–88 (a)	83–87 (h)	
8–8	Top 32	(Turkey) Banvit	84–80 (h)	65–81 (a)	
2014–15 Eurocup 2nd–tier
7–9	Regular season	(Turkey) Beşiktaş Integral Forex	70–68 (a)	57–80 (h)	
7–9	Regular season	(Russia) Khimki	85–88 (h)	77–105 (a)	
7–9	Regular season	(Hungary) Szolnoki Olaj	86–80 (a)	89–67 (h)	
7–9	Regular season	(Russia) Zenit Saint Petersburg	89–84 (h)	74–75 (a)	
7–9	Regular season	(Latvia) VEF Rīga	83–74 (a)	90–61 (h)	
7–9	Top 32	(Germany) Brose Baskets	65–71 (h)	90–91 (a)	
7–9	Top 32	(France) Dijon	81–77 (a)	73–76 (h)	
7–9	Top 32	(Germany) Bayern Munich	80–90 (h)	84–90 (a)	
2015–16 Eurocup 2nd–tier
6–10	Regular season	(Italy) Dolomiti Energia Trento	97–97 (h)	77–90 (a)	
6–10	Regular season	(France) Nanterre	72–85 (a)	78–65 (h)	
6–10	Regular season	(Germany) Telekom Baskets Bonn	77–82 (h)	93–88 (a)	
6–10	Regular season	(Spain) Dominion Bilbao	83–80 (a)	63–84 (h)	
6–10	Regular season	(Germany) EWE Baskets	81–82 (h)	77–75 (a)	
6–10	Top 32	(Israel) Maccabi Tel Aviv	73–82 (a)	73–66 (h)	
6–10	Top 32	(Russia) UNICS	83–89 (h)	64–72 (a)	
6–10	Top 32	(Russia) Nizhny Novgorod	73–79 (h)	74–81 (a)	

== Record ==
KK Olimpija has overall, from 1958 (first participation) to 2015–16 (last participation): 236 wins against 260 defeats in 496 games for all the European club competitions.

- EuroLeague: 151–185 (336)
  - FIBA Saporta Cup: 43–32 (75) /// EuroCup Basketball: 21–27 (48)
    - FIBA Korać Cup: 21–16 (37)

== See also ==
- Yugoslav basketball clubs in European competitions
