= Turkish Basketball Championship =

Top-level basketball championship competition in Turkey

- Sport: Basketball
- Founded: 1946
- Folded: 1967
- Country: Turkey
- Last champions: Altınordu (1st title)
- Most titles: Galatasaray (11 titles)
- Website: tbf.org.tr

The Turkish Basketball Championship (Turkish: Türkiye Basketbol Şampiyonası) was a top-level basketball championship competition in Turkey, that was run by the Turkish Basketball Federation, from 1946 to 1967. In the 1966–67 season, the competition was replaced by the Turkish Basketball Super League (BSL).

== Title holders ==
- 1946: Beykoz
- 1947: Galatasaray
- 1948: Galatasaray
- 1949: Galatasaray
- 1950: Galatasaray
- 1951: Harp Okulu
- 1952: Harp Okulu
- 1953: Galatasaray
- 1954 Modaspor
- 1955: Galatasaray & Modaspor
- 1956: Galatasaray
- 1957: Fenerbahçe
- 1958: Modaspor
- 1959: Fenerbahçe
- 1960: Galatasaray
- 1961: Darüşşafaka
- 1962: Darüşşafaka
- 1963: Galatasaray
- 1964: Galatasaray
- 1965: Fenerbahçe
- 1966: Galatasaray
- 1967: Altınordu

== Performance by club ==
Club	Titles	Runners-up	Winning years
Galatasaray	11	4	1947, 1948, 1949, 1950, 1953, 1955, 1956, 1960, 1963, 1964, 1966
Fenerbahçe	3	6	1957, 1959, 1965
Modaspor	3	1	1954, 1955, 1958
Harp Okulu	2	2	1951, 1952
Darüşşafaka	2	1	1961, 1962
Beykoz	1	–	1946
Altınordu	1	–	1967

== 1955 two domestic champions ==
On April 25, 1955, the last game of the championship was Fenerbahçe against Galatasaray at Spor Sergi Sarayı. Galatasaray and Modaspor were in the championship race until the last game and they had the same number of points. Therefore, the last game was very important for both Galatasaray and Modaspor since the champion would be determined by total point difference. In the game against Galatasaray, Fenerbahçe officials withdrew their team from the match with just 44 seconds left to the end of the match due to Fenerbahçe being behind by 13 points, with no chance of turning the game. Thus the match could not be concluded. Nevertheless, the Federation of Sports declared that such behavior of the Fenerbahçe officials would not be acceptable and there were two domestic champions, Galatasaray and Modaspor, in that year. The trophy was split into two pieces and both clubs could keep these in their museums.

Final ranking

Pos.	Club	Pld	Pts	W	D	L	PF	PA	PD
1.	Galatasaray	5	9	4	0	1	302	222	+80
1.	Modaspor	5	9	4	0	1			
3.	Fenerbahçe	5	9	4	0	1	251	159	+92
4.	Ankaragücü	5	6	1	0	4	232	287	-55
5.	Altınordu	5	6	1	0	4			
6.	Harp Okulu	5	6	1	0	4	226	330	-104

Pos.=Position, Pld=Matches played, W=Matches won, D=Draws, L=Matches lost, PF=Points for, PA=Points against, PD=Points difference

== Participants ==
- 20 seasons: Galatasaray
- 18 seasons: Altınordu
- 13 seasons: Fenerbahçe
- 9 seasons: Harp Okulu, Mülkiye
- 8 seasons: Modaspor
- 6 seasons: TED Ankara Kolejliler
- 5 seasons: İTÜ, MKE Ankaragücü
- 3 seasons: Beyoğluspor, Darüşşafaka
- 2 seasons: Deniz Harp Okulu, Karşıyaka, Stadyum Ankara
- 1 season: Ankara DSİ, Beykozspor, Eskişehir Havagücü, Gençlerbirliği, İzmir Karması, Kurtuluş, Vefaspor, Yüksek Ekonomi ve Ticaret Okulu İzmir

== See also ==
- Basketbol Süper Ligi
- Turkish Basketball Cup
- Turkish Basketball Presidential Cup
- List of Turkish basketball champions
