= Ali Naci Karacan =

Turkish journalist and publisher

Ali Naci Karacan (1896 – 7 July 1955) was a Turkish journalist and publisher. He was a co-founder of the Turkish daily newspaper Akşam (1918) and founder of Milliyet (1955), and his family, including grandson Ali Naci Karacan, built up a publishing group around Milliyet. He was the President of Fenerbahçe S.K. (1926–1927), and the editor of the newly founded Tan from 1935. Born Ali Naci, he later took the additional surname Karacan.

The Ali Naci Karacan Stadı in Gönyeli, Cyprus, near the capital city Nicosia, is named for him.

== Books ==
- Naci Karacan, Ali. Ya Hürriyet Ya Ölüm (1934)
- Naci Karacan, Ali. Lozan Konferansı ve İsmet pașa (1943) – on the Conference of Lausanne and İsmet İnönü
- Tanju, Sadun. Doludizgin: Ali Naci Karacan, bir gazetecinin hayatı. Karacan, 1986.
