= Kurtuluş, Seyhan =

Kurtuluş
- Neighbourhood
- Location within Turkey
- Coordinates: 37°00′02″N 35°19′14″E
- Country: Turkey
- Province: Adana
- District: Seyhan

Government
  - Muhtar: Nevin Biçer
- Elevation: 35 m (115 ft)
- Population (2022): 11,444
- Time zone: UTC+3 (TRT)
- Area code: 0322

Kurtuluş (Turkish pronunciation: [kuɾtuluʃ]) is a neighbourhood (mahalle) in the municipality and district of Seyhan, Adana Province, Turkey. Its population is 11,444 (2022). The neighborhood is part of the downtown of Adana, situated south of the railway lines and east of the Adana Metro line.

== Governance ==
Kurtuluş is a mahalle and it is administered by the Muhtar and the Seniors Council.

== Demographics ==
Most of the residents of Kurtuluş are from families that live in Adana for several generations.

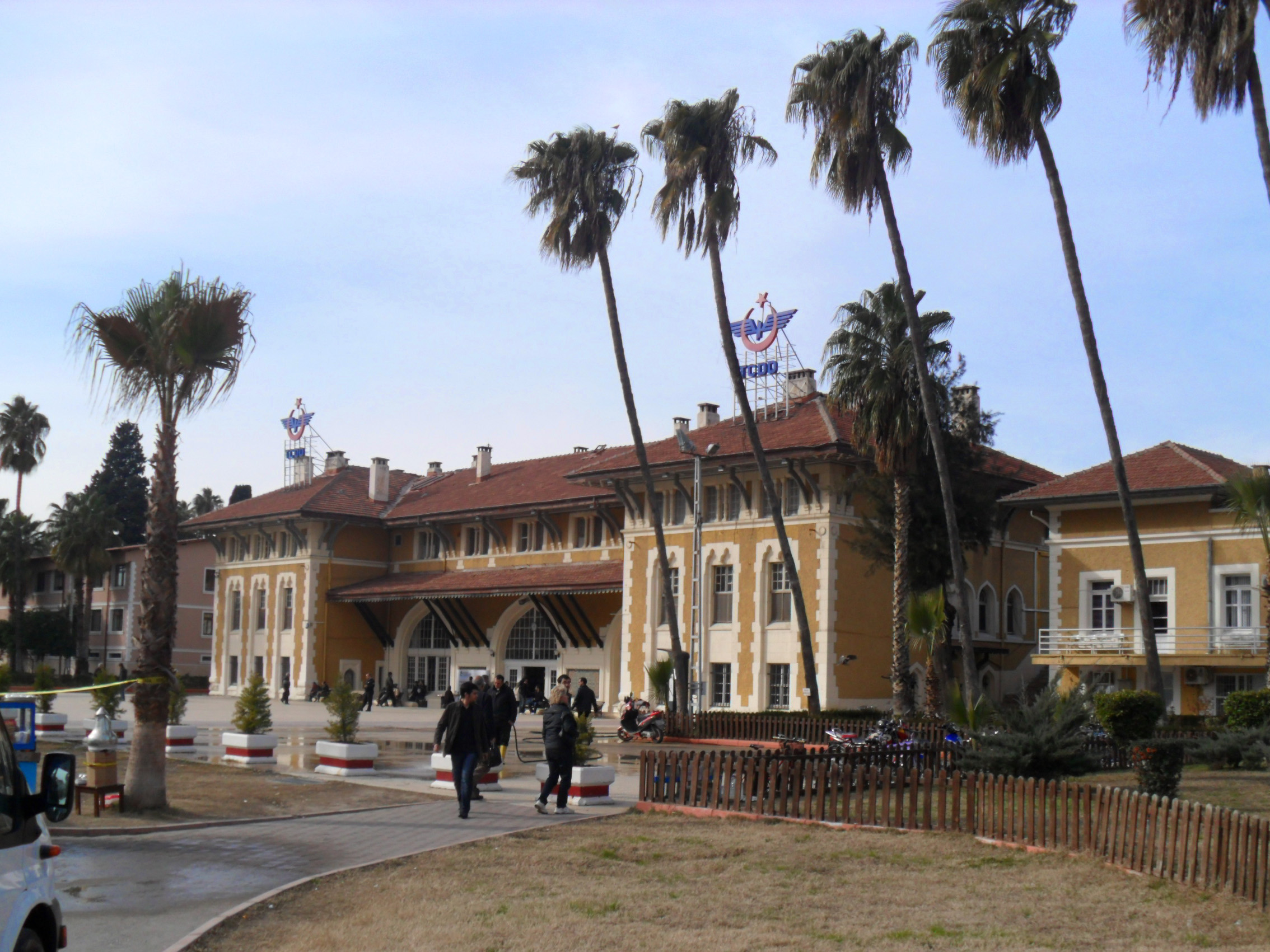
Railway station in the neighborhood

== Economy ==
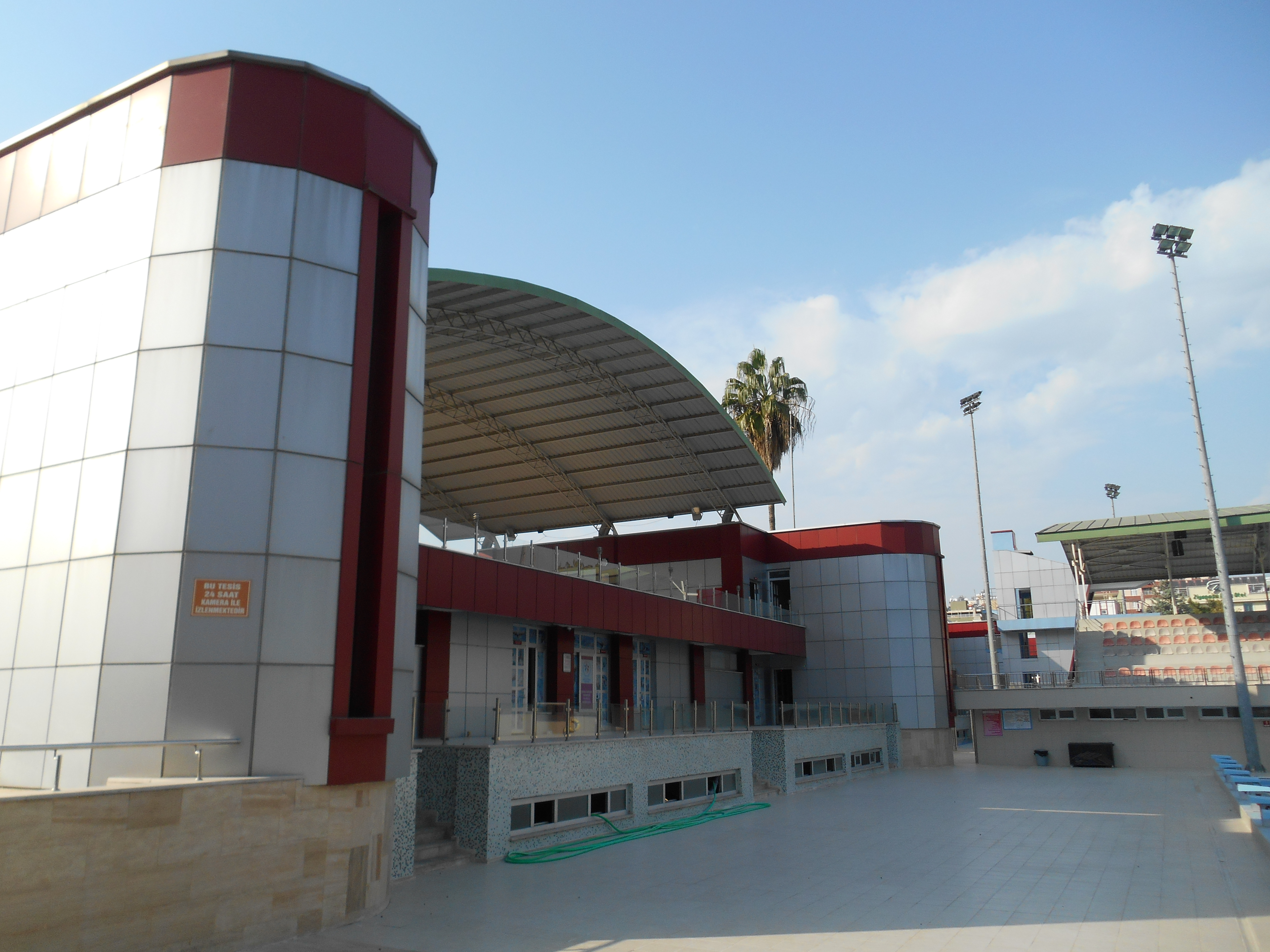
Atatürk Swimming Complex

Kurtuluş is one of the wealthiest neighbourhoods in the city. Education levels are higher than most of the neighborhoods of Adana. TCDD and Türk Telekom regional headquarters are within the neighborhood.

Kurtuluş farmer's market serves from Tuesday at 11am to Wednesdays at 15pm, every week, east of the Atatürk Swimming Complex.

== Sports ==
Adana's major water sports hall, the Atatürk Swimming Complex is located within the neighborhood. There are two tennis courts next to the complex. Adana Demirspor youth football training ground is also in the neighborhood, next to the club's office in the Sular area.

== Transport ==
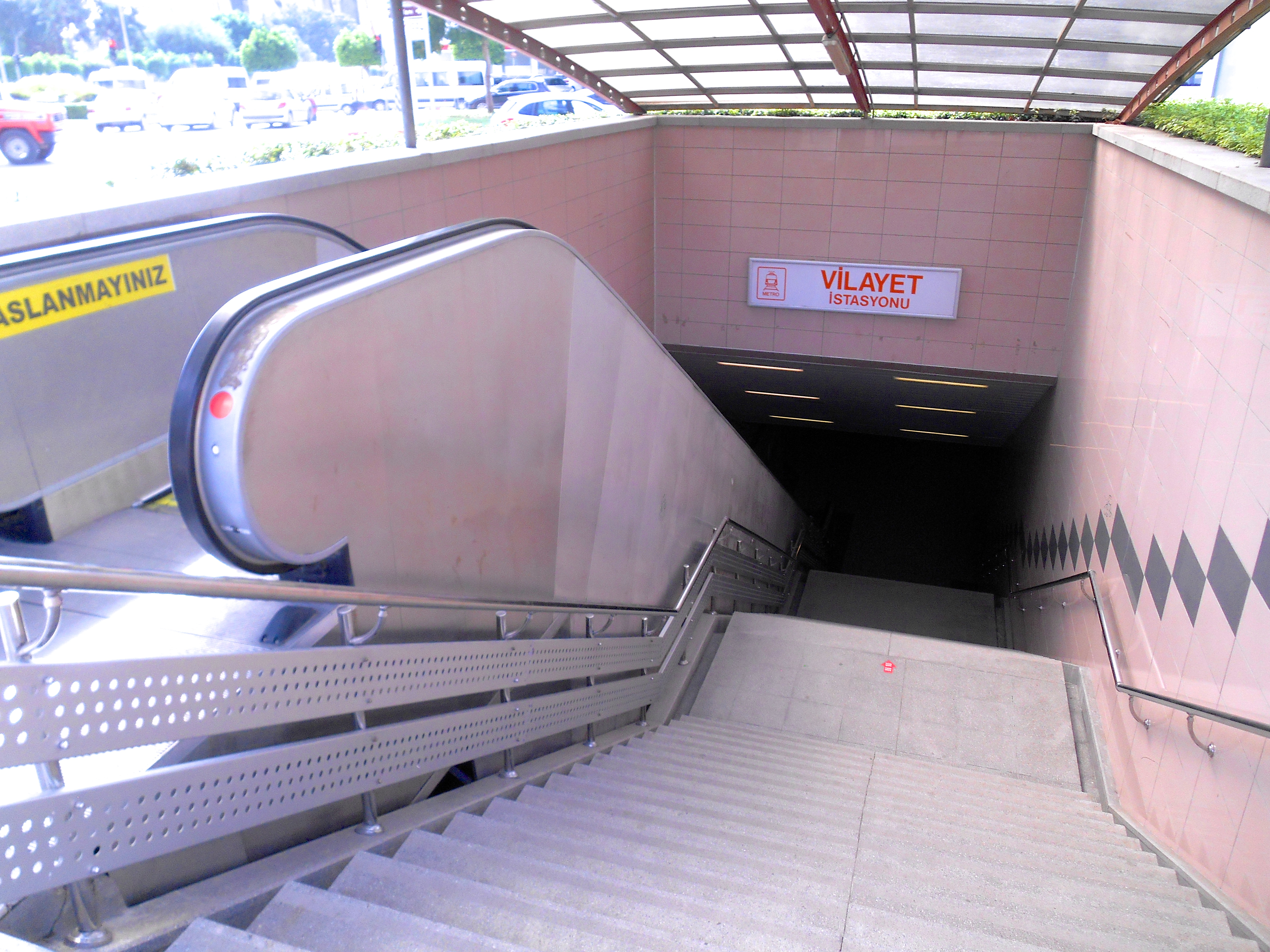
Metro entrance

Adana Central railway station is within the Kurtuluş mahalle, at the Sular area. Vilayet station of the Adana Metro is located at the northwest section of Kurtuluş. Adana Metropolitan Municipality Bus Department (ABBO) has bus routes from Atatürk and Ziyapaşa boulevard in Kurtuluş to most of the neighborhoods of Adana.

Şakirpaşa Airport is 4.4 km west of the neighborhood and can accessed by Bus #159.
