= Great Famine (Greece) =

World War II starvation in Greece

The Great Famine Μεγάλος Λιμός
- Country: Greece
- Location: Most of Greece (urban, rural areas, islands)
- Period: 1941–1942
- Total deaths: Est. 300,000 (mortality rate reached a peak in the winter of 1941–1942, and 150,000 just in 1941 alone) Nazi claim at the time: ~70,000
- Relief: After the lifting of the naval blockade, the first humanitarian missions began from Turkey, with a total of 17,500 tons of food aid being supplied from the country until the end of 1946, with significant support from Turkish, Greek and other humanitarian organizations. Other neutral and non-aligned nations such as Sweden sought to also support the humanitarian effort.
- Consequences: Deaths, lootings, destruction of Greek infrastructure and severe economic damage, and international humanitarian support
- Preceded by: Axis invasion of Greece by Fascist Italy, Kingdom of Bulgaria and Nazi Germany, Nazi massacres, and a naval blockade by the Allied forces which caused supply shortages

The Great Famine (Greek: Μεγάλος Λιμός, sometimes called the Grand Famine) was a period of mass starvation during the Axis occupation of Greece (1941–1944), during World War II. The local population suffered greatly during this period, while the Axis powers initiated a policy of large-scale plunder. Requisitions, together with a blockade by the Allies, the ruined state of the country's infrastructure after the German invasion of Greece, and the emergence of a powerful and well-connected black market, resulted in the Great Famine, with the mortality rate reaching a peak during the winter of 1941–42.

The resulting human suffering, and the resulting pressure from the Greek diaspora, eventually forced the Royal Navy to partially lift the blockade. Through the end of 1941, Kızılay (the Turkish Red Crescent), and in the summer of 1942, the International Red Cross, were able to distribute supplies in sufficient quantities with the help of several foreign and Greece-based humanitarian organizations helping with financial aid and support. The situation remained grim until the end of the Nazi occupation, and continued on a small scale until the end of the war.

== Background ==
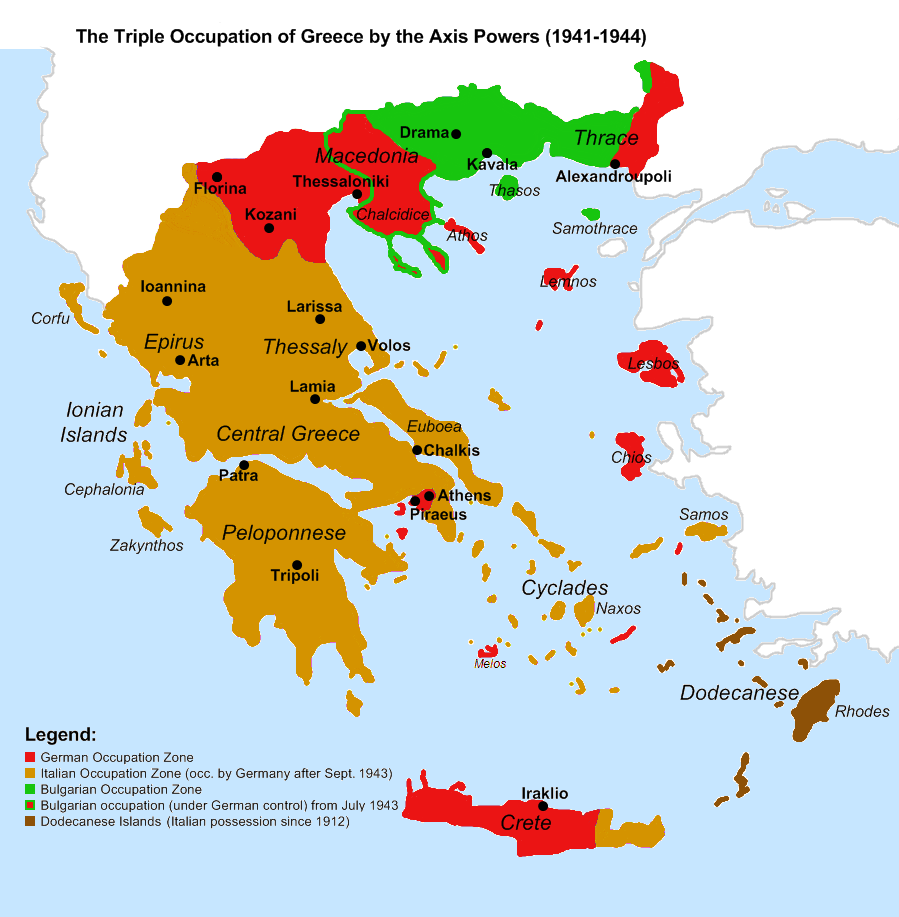
The three occupation zones. Italian German Bulgarian

An invasion of Greece was carried out by Fascist Italy from Albania on 28 October 1940; however, the invasion was quickly turned into a humiliating defeat for the Italians. Greek forces managed to penetrate deep into Albanian territory, so on 6 April 1941, Greece was attacked by Nazi Germany and the Greek forces fell back quickly under the firepower of the blitzkrieg. Immediately following their victory, the occupying powers divided the country into 3 zones between which any movement of goods and people was strictly prohibited: the Germans occupied parts of Athens, the region around Thessaloniki, a few strategic outposts in the Aegean and the island of Crete; the Bulgarians held the northern regions of Thrace and Eastern Macedonia; and the Italians controlled most of the mainland and the Ionian Islands.

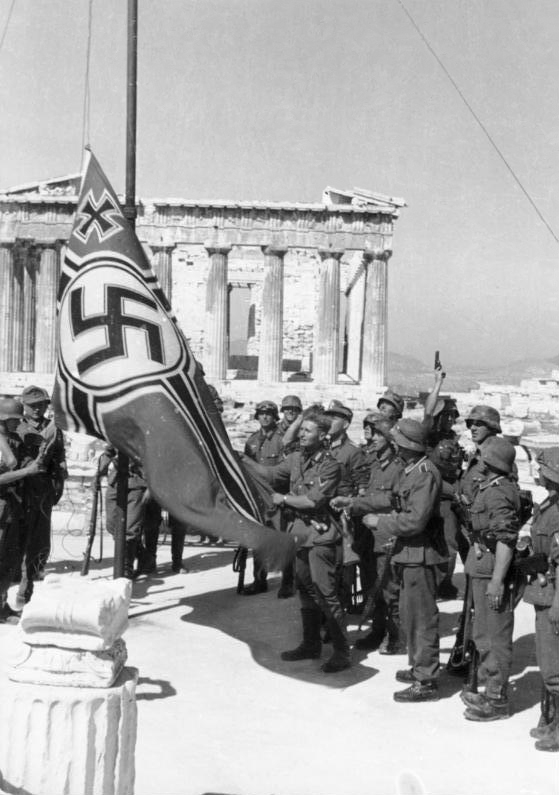
German soldiers raising the German War Flag over the Acropolis. An official Nazi propaganda photo

In general, the Axis powers viewed conquered nations as sources of raw materials, food and labor. As a matter of policy, subjugated nations were to provide material support to Germany and Italy. From the outset of the occupation, German and Italian troops initiated wide-scale plunder of everything of value, with pillage, torture, execution, and civilian massacre also occurring. The Nazi attitude toward occupied peoples was expressed succinctly by Hermann Göring in a letter to Reich commissioners and military commanders of occupied territories on 6 August 1942:

...This continual concern for the aliens must come to an end once and for all... I could not care less when you say that people under your administration are dying of hunger. Let them perish so long as no German starves.

== First months of occupation ==
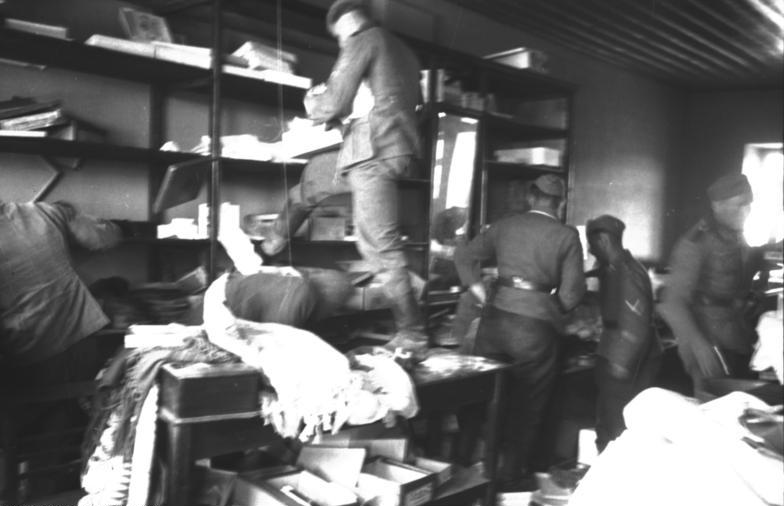
German soldiers in a shop

Within the occupation zones, the confiscation of fuel and all means of transportation (including fishing boats and pack animals) prevented any transfer of food and other supplies and reduced mobility to a minimum. The occupiers seized strategic industries and appropriated or bought them at low prices, paying with occupation marks. They circulated all stocks of commodities like tobacco, olive oil, cotton, and leather and transferred them to their home countries.

Laird Archer, who worked for an American aid agency and was in Athens when the Germans entered the city on 27 April 1941, noted in his Journal:

April 28 … The wholesale looting of Athens has begun.

Remaining food and fuel reserves have been taken first. … [A staff member] found the entire market sealed under the swastika. The Germans have emptied all public [fuel] tanks].… A Marathon farmer, who made his way in today to report that our nurses were safe in the hills, said that his flocks of poultry, even the pigeons, had been machine-gunned and the swastika planted at the four corners of the field. He had been warned to take nothing from the fields on pain of death.

The invaders have been taking meat, cattle and sheep north of the city for some days and now have reserved the dairy herds in the environs of Athens for their own use. … My friends in the Ministry of Agriculture estimate that the 200,000-ton domestic supply may be cut to a third by the slaughtering.

Modern transport has been seized simultaneously with food supplies. Syntagma square is already filled with seized cars. … Buses likewise are being taken. And especially trucks… Orders posted and radioed require all bicycles to be delivered to a given location, More than five thousand have been taken.

Wholesale and retail shops are being systematically cleared out. This is done by the polite method of "purchase" with freshly printed Occupation Marks, of no value outside of Greece. Early this morning, all troops in Athens not on detail were issued with 100 of such marks each. … They were sent into the shops to buy anything from women's stockings to electrical equipment. They took their "purchases" to the parcel post office or to the reailway express and promptly shipped them home to the Reich… I saw a squad of soldiers, who had cleaned out a small leathergoods shop, carry their new suitcases to a clothing store to be filled. The Eastman Kodak store has been emptied of cameras. … Principal Greek industries are being taken over. This is done by the same polite system of "purchasing" 60 percent of the issued stock and installing a German director.

Raw materials, metal, leather and so on are being confiscated. Scores of little factories, turned back to their owners by the sneering Germans as not of any importance, are without materials for processing. … Carpenters can't get nails with which to get on with the few construction jobs that are still in progress. Even cement… can no longer be had.

Finally, hospital and drugstore supplies are being taken…

The incredible speed and efficiency of this leaves us dazed, not knowing where to turn for the most ordinary supplies.

Unemployment rose to extreme levels, while large levies were extorted from the Greek collaborationist government to sustain the occupying forces. Occupied Greece was not only burdened with the occupation costs of the German and Italian armies but also with the expenses of Axis military projects in the Eastern Mediterranean. Unlike the rest of the occupied countries, whose costs were limited to their actual defense appropriations prior to the Axis invasion, the size of Greece's levy in 1941–1942 reached 113.7% of the local national income.

Exacerbating the problem, the Allied forces responded with a full naval blockade in order to weaken the Axis in its military efforts. This cut off all imports to Greece, including food.

Farmers in Greece had to pay a 10% in kind tax on their produce, and sell to the collaborationist government at fixed prices for all production above the subsistence level. The food price controls and rationing that had been in place before the Greek defeat were now tightened. Due to low government prices and newly imposed taxes, farmers went to great lengths to hide their produce from the officials and traders pulled their merchandise from the shelves, a factor that added to the severing of the foreign trade routes on which Greece traditionally depended for food imports. Thus, the scarcity of food supplies resulted in the increase of their prices, while the circulation of the German Occupation Reichsmark and the Italian Casa Mediterranean Drachma soon led to inflation under which the black market and rationing became the only means of food supply in the urban areas of Greece. Fishing was also prohibited, at least during the early period of occupation. Moreover, the Bulgarians forbade any transportation of grain from their zone, where 30% of Greek pre-war production took place, to the rest of the country.

In mid-September 1941, when the famine was imminent, Berlin responded to enquiries of German officials in Greece:

Supplying Belgium and probably Holland and Norway as well, will be more urgent from the standpoint of military economy than supplying Greece.

Contrary to the rational exploitation of national resources applied to occupied countries in Western and Northern Europe, the Germans in Greece resorted to a policy of plunder. Although the collaborationist government under Georgios Tsolakoglou requested that the Axis import grain before the winter, this had no serious impact; Germany and Italy sent a very small amount of grain while Bulgaria sent nothing at all. The few organized efforts by the Orthodox Church and Red Cross were unable to meet the needs of the population.

Determining factors of the food crisis included low food availability and curtailment of communications, partly due to the severe lack of transport facilities (especially because it was imposed on both goods and persons). Other factors included the attempts by the local government and occupying forces to regulate the market and its prices.

== Winter of 1941–1942 ==
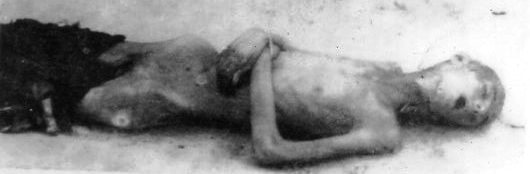
A dead body of a starved child

The situation became critical in the summer of 1941 and in the autumn became a full-blown famine. Especially in the first winter of occupation (1941–42) food shortages were acute and famine struck, especially in the urban centers of the country. Food shortages reached a climax and famine was unavoidable. During that winter the mortality rate peaked, and according to British historian, Mark Mazower, this was the worst famine the Greeks had experienced since ancient times. Dead bodies were secretly abandoned in cemeteries or on the streets (possibly so their ration cards could continue to be used by surviving relatives). In other cases, bodies were found days after death. The sight of emaciated dead bodies was commonplace in the streets of Athens.

The situation in the port of Piraeus and the wider Athens area was out of control; hyperinflation was in full swing and the price of bread multiplied by nearly 90 times from April 1941 to June 1942. According to the records of the German army, the mortality rate in Athens alone reached 300 deaths per day during December 1941, while the estimates of the Red Cross were much higher, at 400 deaths, while on some days the death toll reached 1,000. Apart from the urban areas, the population of the islands was also affected by the famine, especially those living in Mykonos, Syros and Chios.

There are no completely accurate numbers of famine deaths because civil registration records did not function during the occupation. In general, it is estimated that Greece suffered approximately 300,000 deaths during the Axis occupation as a result of famine and malnutrition. However, not all parts of Greece experienced equal levels of food scarcity. Although comprehensive data on regional famine severity does not exist, the available evidence indicates that the severe movement restrictions, proximity to agricultural production, and level of urbanization were crucial factors of famine mortality.

== Lifting of the Allied blockade ==
Universal Newsreel about distribution of food to the Greek people in 1944

Britain was initially reluctant to lift the blockade; however, a compromise was reached to allow shipments of grain to come from neutral Turkey. The first and most significant ship with food supplies that was permitted to supply Greece was the SS Kurtuluş from Turkey, in September 1941. It set sail from Istanbul. Foodstuffs were collected by a nationwide campaign of the Kızılay (Turkish Red Crescent) and the operation was mainly funded by the Greek-American Greek War Relief Association and the Hellenic Union of Constantinopolitans. Initially a total of 50,000 tons of food supplies were to be shipped from Turkey; however, only 17,500 tons were actually delivered.

This assistance was mostly symbolic; one assigned ship was unable to alleviate such an extreme situation alone, and the state of the Turkish economy was generally limited at the time. After colliding with a rock off the coast of Marmara Island due to heavy weather conditions in the Sea of Marmara, SS Kurtuluş was damaged and sank the following day during her fifth voyage from Istanbul to Piraeus, Athens.

She alone had supplied a total of 6,700 tons of aid during her service in the humanitarian campaign. After the sinking, Turkey and collaborative humanitarian organizations kept supplying Greece with humanitarian needs. Ships such as the SS Dumlupınar, SS Tunç, SS Konya, SS Güneysu and SS Aksu were assigned to part-time food delivery with a more limited amount of supplies. One ship, the SS Dumlupınar, brought about 1,000 sick Greek children aged 13–16 to Istanbul, to recuperate in a safe place during the war, and later returned them to Greece.

Because of the efforts of the Greek diaspora in the United States and Great Britain, the situation of the starving civilian population in Greece soon became a public issue in Allied countries. The increasing public pressure finally led to the lifting of the naval blockade in February 1942. The plan was carried out under the International Red Cross, and Sweden offered to transport 15,000 tons of Canadian wheat. Wheat shipments soon began and, together with the rising temperatures of springtime, reduced the mortality rate. At the end of 1942, a steady supply of sufficient quantity to the country's largest ports caused to mortality rate to fall, but the food situation remained grim until the end of the occupation (in 1944).

International relief focused mainly on children. In Athens, the Red Cross provided daily milk rations, medical services and clothing to children younger than two. The following March, the occupiers and Allied forces agreed to the establishment of the Swedish-run Joint Relief Commission to reorganize the public food supply system. The occupiers also committed to replacing all appropriated agricultural products with food imports of equal calorific value and relaxed the harshest mobility restrictions and price regulations.

== Nazi bailout plan and the resistance ==
The collapse of the Greek monetary system was imminent, and the Germans were alarmed that such a possibility would render worthless the flow of drachmas to their troops. To deal with this situation, Hermann Neubacher was appointed the Reich's special commissioner in Greece. Neubacher's objective was to sustain Axis operation in Greece without destroying the Greek economy. His initiative was eased by the supplies provided by the International Red Cross.

From 1943 onward, large areas of the countryside witnessed reprisal operations, the burning of settlements, and massive executions by the Germans, particularly in Epirus and Thessaly. German military operations against rising guerrilla activity in rural areas sent large numbers of people into towns or mountains, emptying part of the countryside of its labour force. Famine conditions appeared again during the winter of 1943–44 in Aetolia and some islands. Moreover, the rural population did not receive Red Cross supplies like the cities, either because the Germans retaliated against villages suspected of supporting guerrillas or because they feared that the supplies would fall into the hands of the resistance. However, the largest Greek resistance organization, the National Liberation Front (EAM), took the initiative and distributed food and clothing to the regions it controlled at the time.

== Impact on literature and thought ==
In the modern vernacular Greek language the word "occupation" is almost synonymous with famine and hunger due to the harsh situation the Greek population faced during the years of WWII. Stockpiling unnecessary amounts of food and an irrational fear upon seeing an empty pantry, is still colloquially called occupation syndrome by many Greeks, since these behaviours were especially common during the postwar years.

Several works mention the hardships faced by the Greek population during the occupation. One of these is the novel Zorba the Greek by Nikos Kazantzakis, which reflected the starvation and general danger of the time.

== See also ==
- Siege of Leningrad
- Blockade of Germany (1939–1945)
- Dutch famine of 1944–1945
- Holodomor
- SS Kurtuluş
- Chinese famine of 1942–1943
- Vietnamese famine of 1944–1945
- Bengal famine of 1943

== Sources ==
- Clogg, Richard (2008). Bearing Gifts to Greeks: Humanitarian Aid to Greece in the 1940s. Palgrave Macmillan. ISBN 978-0230500358.
- Matalas, Antonia-Leda; Grivetti, Louis E.; Henry, Jeya, Macbeth, Helen (2007). Non-Food Food during Famine: the Athens Famine Survivor Project (1. publ. ed.). New York: Berghahn Books. doi:10.2307/j.ctt1x76f70.18. ISBN 978-1-84545-353-4.
- Voglis, Polymeris (2006). "Surviving Hunger: Life in the Cities and the Countryside during the Occupation". In Gildea, Robert; Wievorka, Olivier; Warring, Anette (eds.). Surviving Hitler and Mussolini: Daily Life in Occupied Europe. Oxford: Berg. pp. 16–41. ISBN 978-1-84520-181-4.
- Hionidou, Violetta (2006). Famine and death in occupied Greece : 1941–1944 (1. publ. ed.). Cambridge [u.a.]: Cambridge Univ. Press. ISBN 978-0-521-82932-8.
- De Wever, Bruno; van Goethem, Herman; Wouters, Nico (2006). Local government in occupied Europe : (1939–1945). Gent: Academia Press. ISBN 978-90-382-0892-3.
- Kojak, James B. (2006). "Italian Policy in Occupied Greece: Counterproductive Policy Frustrated War Aims". Maxwell Air Force Base, Alabama.
- Hionidou, Violetta (2002). "'Send Us either Food or Coffins': The 1941-2 Famine on the Aegean Island of Syros". "Send us Either Food or Coffins": The 1941–2 Famine on the Aegean Island of Syros. Oxford [England]: Oxford University Press. pp. 181–203. doi:10.1093/oso/9780199251919.003.0009. ISBN 978-0-19-925191-9.
- Palairet, Michael (2000). The four ends of the Greek hyperinflation of 1941–1946. København: Museum Tusculanum Press [u.a.] ISBN 978-87-7289-582-6.
- Mark Mazower (1995). Inside Hitler's Greece: The Experience of Occupation, 1941–44. Yale University Press. ISBN 0-300-08923-6.
- Laiou-Thomadakis, Angeliki (1980). "The Politics of Hunger: Economic Aid to Greece, 1943–1945". Journal of the Hellenic Diaspora. 07. hdl:10066/5356.
- Documents on German Foreign Policy, series D, volume XIII (June 23 - December 11, 1941)
