= Aziz Yıldırım =

Turkish businessman and civil engineer (born 1952)

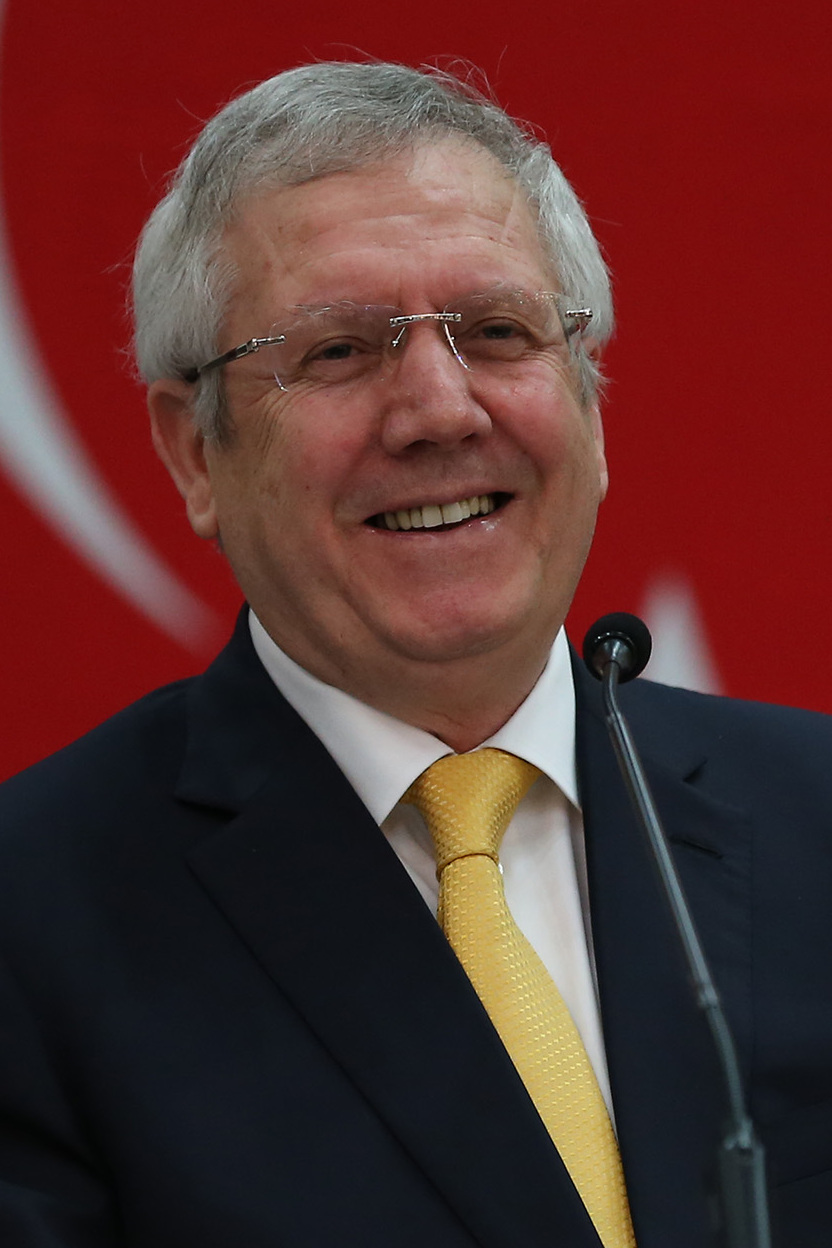
- Yıldırım in 2017

President of Fenerbahçe
- Incumbent
- Assumed office 10 June 2026
- Preceded by: Sadettin Saran
- In office 14 February 1998 – 5 June 2018
- Preceded by: Ali Haydar Şen
- Succeeded by: Ali Koç

Personal details
- Born: 2 November 1952 (age 73) Ergani, Diyarbakır, Turkey
- Spouses: Yıldız Yıldırım (m. 1981; div. 2010) Gonca Çelikkıran (m. 2011)
- Children: 3
- Education: Ankara State Academy of Engineering and Architecture
- Profession: Engineer, businessperson

Aziz Yıldırım (born 2 November 1952) is a Turkish businessman and civil engineer who served as the 32nd chairman of the Turkish multi-sport club Fenerbahçe S.K.. He lost the election held on 3 June 2018 to Ali Koç which made Koç the 33rd president of the Turkish club. He served the club as the president from 1998 to 2018. He has a degree in civil engineering. In May 2026, Yıldırım once again declared his candidacy for chairman of Fenerbahçe S.K., seeking to get reelected. On 7 June 2026, he was re-elected chairman of Fenerbahçe.

== Personal life ==
Yıldırım was born in Ergani. He has 3 daughters, two of whom are from his first marriage.

== 2011 Turkish sports corruption scandal ==
On 2 July 2012, a Turkish "Special Authority Court" sentenced Yıldırım to three years and nine months for match-fixing and two years and six months for forming an illegal organisation. The sentence was later approved by the Turkish Supreme Court of Appeals. He was detained for one year in Metris Prison together with several other sportspeople involved in the scandal. However, on 6 March 2014 special authority courts were abolished in Turkey. On 23 July 2014, his earlier retrial demand was accepted. On 9 October 2015, the courts acquitted Aziz Yıldırım and all the people who were charged at the beginning of the investigation, pending the Supreme Court's approval. Fenerbahce declared that after the Supreme Court's approval, they would take every action to be compensated from all of the damages that has been done to the club by this investigation and previous court rulings.
