= Kurtuluş: The Steamship That Carried Peace =

The Steamship That Carried Peace Barışı Taşıyan Vapur
- Directed by: Erhan Cerrahoğlu
- Written by: Erhan Cerrahoğlu
- Release date: June 1, 2006 (Istanbul)
- Running time: 53 min
- Country: Turkey
- Language: Turkish

The Steamship That Carried Peace (Turkish: Barışı Taşıyan Vapur) is a documentary film about the Turkish steamship SS Kurtuluş, that sank in 1942 in the Marmara Sea while taking food aid to Greece under Nazi occupation and suffering the Great Famine. The film was based on the research by Turkish writer-researcher-film director Erhan Cerrahoğlu and debuted on June 1, 2006 in Istanbul.

== See also ==
- SS Kurtuluş
- Great Famine (Greece)
