= Sadettin Saran =

American-Turkish businessman

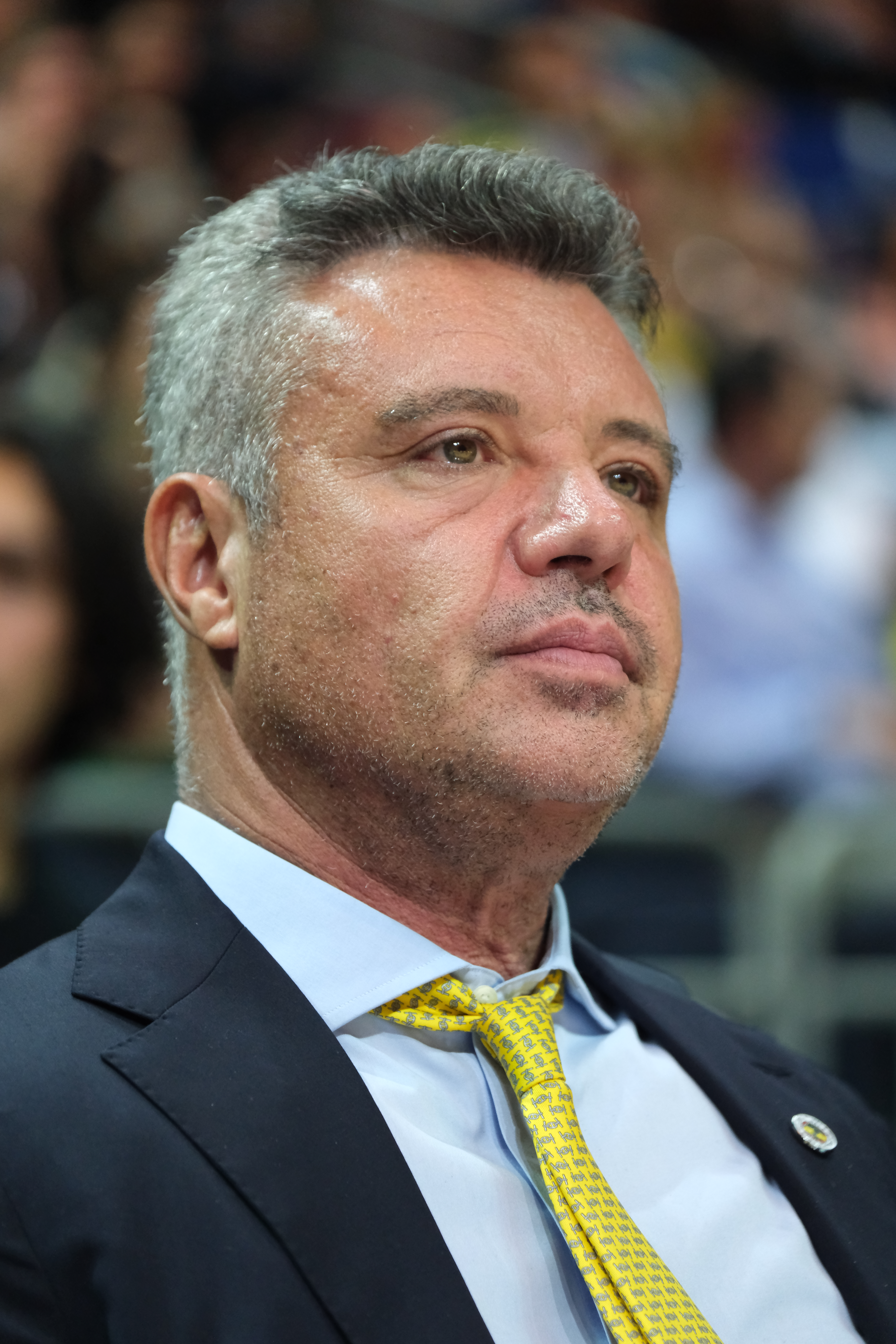
- Saran in 2025

President of Fenerbahçe
- In office 25 September 2025 – 10 June 2026
- Preceded by: Ali Koç
- Succeeded by: Aziz Yıldırım

Vice President of Fenerbahçe
- In office 1 July 2001 – 7 June 2003
- President: Aziz Yıldırım
- Preceded by: Şadan Kalkavan
- Succeeded by: Hakan Bilal Kutlualp

Personal details
- Born: Steven Sadettin Saran; August 30, 1964 (age 62) Denver, Colorado, U.S.
- Education: University of Kentucky
- Occupation: Businessman and sports executive.

Steven Sadettin Saran (born 30 August 1964) is a Turkish-American former athlete, businessman and sports executive. In September 2025, he became the 34th president of Fenerbahçe Sports Club.

== Biography ==
Saran was born in Denver, Colorado to a Turkish father Özbek Saran and an American mother Geraldine Saran. He studied Mechanical Engineering at the University of Kentucky in the United States.

While he was studying in the US, he was the captain of the school's swimming team and was named the Most Valuable Athlete for two years. He was the captain of the Turkish National Swimming Team in 1984–1985 and broke the 50-meter freestyle swimming record during this period.

Saran, who later came to Turkey after completing his education, worked at the Ministry of Culture and Tourism. Later, he founded Saran Holding and assumed the representation of many well-known world brands. Between 1990 and 1995, he served as Assistant General Manager and General Manager at Martin Marietta's Ankara Office.

Saran, who has a daughter named Lal from a previous marriage, speaks Spanish, intermediate German, and English.

== Saran Holding ==
Saran Holding, which he founded in Istanbul in 1990, operates in the media, publishing, internet platforms, aviation, tourism and betting sectors.

In Saran Media, it owns approximately 65% of sports broadcasting in Turkey and holds the broadcasting rights for major events such as La Liga, Serie A, Premier League, and UEFA competitions. It also operates hotels in Split and Prague in the tourism sector. With 33 different companies and approximately 2,000 employees, the company is one of Türkiye's major business groups.

Media organizations such as S Sport, Radyospor, Radyo Music, Radyo Traffic, Ajansspor sports portal and tuttur.com betting site also belong to Sadettin Saran. (He halted operations of tuttur.com because of legislation of Turkish Football Federation.)

== Fenerbahçe ==
Saran is a member of the High Council of Fenerbahçe S.K. with registration number 9945. He took charge in the board as executive of the department of football during the presidency of Aziz Yıldırım. His relations with Aziz Yıldırım sharply deteriorated because he did not approve the actions of the president, criticizing him clearly. As a result of this, he was illegally dismissed from the board. He sued the club for being unfairly expelled. Eventually, the Turkish Court concluded that Saran won the 7-year long case.

On 16 December 2021, Saran stated that he would be a candidate for presidency of Fenerbahçe S.K. in the future.

On 30 July 2025, Saran became candidate via "500 Candidate's signature (As needed for Club Charter)" and he became president candidate in extraordinary elections, for Fenerbahçe SK.

At the Fenerbahçe Sports Club Extraordinary General Assembly Meeting held on 21 September 2025, 24,732 votes were cast, of which 24,393 were deemed valid. Saran became the 38th president of Fenerbahçe with 12,325 votes, while President Ali Koç received 12,068 votes. 135 blank votes were cast, and 204 votes were deemed invalid.

== Borussia Dortmund ==
Saran, who was a shareholder of Borussia Dortmund, one of the Bundesliga teams, sold his shares after receiving backlash from club members and fans.

== Use of illegal substances ==
On 24 December 2025, during his Fenerbahçe presidency Saran was detained by police after testing positive for illegal drugs, and WhatsApp messages allegedly discussing recreational drug use. Saran rejected all accusations and noted that he had "nothing to hide" and would fully cooperate with authorities. A day after on 25 December 2025, he was released under judicial condition.
