= Greek War Relief Association =

World War II relief organization

The Greek War Relief Association (sometimes Greek Relief Association or abbreviated GWRA) was a relief organization for Greek civilians created during World War II. Founded by prominent Greek-American businessmen, along with railroad tycoon Harold Vanderbilt and film industry executive Spyros Skouras, the association provided economic relief to Greeks following Italian and German invasions. Aid was especially focused on food and medicine to mitigate the severe famine of the winter of 1941/42.

Films such as Fantasia and Gone with the Wind opened with gala premieres with proceeds benefiting the Greek War Relief Association.

In a multinational agreement which included Nazi Germany, the GWRA continued to deliver supplies to Greece following occupation in 1942. Three neutral Swedish-flagged ships were chartered, along with Swedish and International Red Cross workers to distribute the cargos. Between 1942 and 1944, roughly 75-million USD in aid was sent to Greece from abroad (according to Skouras).
