= Istanbul Basketball League =

Discontinued regional basketball league competition in Turkey

- Sport: Basketball
- Founded: 1926
- Folded: 1966
- Country: Turkey
- Last champion: Fenerbahçe (7th title)
- Most titles: Galatasaray (15 titles)
- Website: tbf.org.tr

The Istanbul Basketball League (Turkish: İstanbul Basketbol Ligi) was a regional basketball league competition in Turkey, that was run by the Turkish Basketball Federation from 1926 to 1966. The league lost its first level status after the nationwide Turkish Super League was introduced in the 1966–67 season.

== Champions ==
Season	Winners	Runners-up
1926–27	Maccabi	?
1927–28	Maccabi	?
1928–29	Maccabi	?
1929–30	Maccabi	?
1930–31	Maccabi	?
1931–32	Maccabi	?
1932–33	İstanbulspor	Galatasaray
1933–34	Galatasaray	?
1934–38	Not held	
1938–39	Kurtuluş	?
1939–40	Kurtuluş	Galatasaray
1940–41	Not held	
1941–42	Galatasaray	Kurtuluş
1942–43	Galatasaray	Beşiktaş
1943–44	Kurtuluş	Beyoğluspor
1944–45	Galatasaray	Beyoğluspor
1945–46	Galatasaray	Beykoz
1946–47	Galatasaray	Kurtuluş
1947–48	Galatasaray	Beyoğluspor
1948–49	Galatasaray	Beyoğluspor
1949–50	Galatasaray	Beyoğluspor
1950–51	Galatasaray	Fenerbahçe
1951–52	Galatasaray	Modaspor
1952–53	Galatasaray	Modaspor
1953–54	Galatasaray	Fenerbahçe
1954–55	Fenerbahçe	Galatasaray
1955–56	Fenerbahçe	Galatasaray
1956–57	Fenerbahçe	Galatasaray
1957–58	Galatasaray	Fenerbahçe
1958–59	Modaspor	Galatasaray
1959–60	Darüşşafaka	Modaspor
1960–61	Galatasaray	Modaspor
1961–62	Deniz Harp Okulu	Galatasaray
1962–63	Fenerbahçe	İTÜ
1963–64	Fenerbahçe	Galatasaray
1964–65	Fenerbahçe	İTÜ
1965–66	Fenerbahçe	Galatasaray

== Performance by club ==
Club	Titles	Runners-up
Galatasaray	15	9
Fenerbahçe	7	3
Maccabi	6	–
Kurtuluş	3	2
Modaspor	1	4
Darüşşafaka	1	–
İstanbulspor	1	–
Deniz Harp Okulu	1	–
Beyoğluspor	–	5
İTÜ	–	2
Beşiktaş	–	1
Beykoz	–	1
