= Maccabi S.K. =

Maccabi SK
- Full name: Maccabi Spor Kulübü (Maccabi Sports Club)
- Founded: 1913
- Disbanded: 1940s
- Colours: Blue, White

Maccabi SK (Hebrew: מכבי ש.ק.) was a sports club in the city of Istanbul, historically representing the Jewish community of the city. The club was founded by local Jews in the district of Hasköy, Beyoğlu. Maccabi SK was active in football and basketball. The colours of the club were white and blue.

== History ==
Maccabi SK was founded in 1913 by members of the Jewish community in the district of Hasköy, Istanbul. Its players were all of the Jewish faith. The football branch of the club participated in the 1919-20 Sunday League.

The club was active in several sports, including football and basketball, where the greatest success could be achieved. The basketball team became Istanbul champions six times in a row. Maccabi was active until the 1940s, then the club was dissolved after many Turkish Jews left the country for Israel, due to the wealth tax imposed on non-Muslims in 1942. There they founded the club of Maccabi Haifa, one of the major sports clubs in the country. Managers of Maccabi Haifa visited the former president of Maccabi SK in 1996.

== Honours ==
- Istanbul Basketball League
  - Winners (6): 1926–27, 1927–28, 1928–29, 1929–30, 1930–31, 1931–32
