= SS Kurtuluş =

Turkish cargo ship

Coordinates: 40°40′17″N 27°38′00″E

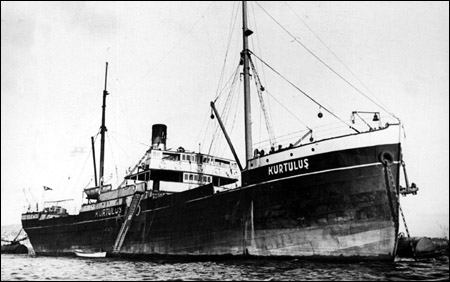
- SS Kurtuluş

History

Turkey
- Name: SS Teşvikiye (1924–1930), SS Bülent (1930–1934), SS Kurtuluş (1934–1942), also see register below
- Builder: Caird & Purdie Shipyard in Barrow-in-Furness, Cumbria, England
- Launched: 8 May 1883
- In service: 1883
- Out of service: 20 January 1942
- Home port: Istanbul
- Fate: Sank on 20 January 1942 off Marmara Island

General characteristics
- Length: 75.5 m (247 ft 8 in)
- Capacity: 2,735

SS Kurtuluş was a Turkish cargo ship, which became famous for her humanitarian role in carrying food aid during the famine Greece suffered under the Axis occupation in World War II. She sank on 20 February 1942 in the Sea of Marmara during her fifth voyage from Istanbul, Turkey, to Piraeus, Greece. In Turkish, kurtuluş means "liberation".

== History of the ship ==
Year	Name	Country
1883	SS Euripides	Greece
1896	SS Razeto	Italy
1897	SS Bratia Paramonovi	Russia
1901	SS Cephalonia Vagiano	Greece
1905	SS Michael Archangel	Russia
1915	N41	Russian Navy
1918	SS Michael Archangel	Serbia
1924	SS Teşvikiye	Turkey
1930	SS Bülent	Turkey
1934–1942	SS Kurtuluş	Turkey

The steamer Kurtuluş was built by Caird and Purdie Shipyard in Barrow-in-Furness, Cumbria, England, in 1883. She was a dry-freight carrier, 76.5 metres (251 ft 0 in) long with 2,735 gross register tons capacity. After having served under different flags and names, she was purchased in 1924 by the prominent Turkish ship owning family, Kalkavan brothers.

She served as freighter in Turkish waters as one of the first ships under the flag of the newly established Turkish Republic. She was resold in 1934 to another family active in the same field, Tavilzade brothers, who named her "SS Kurtuluş" ("SS Liberation") in 1934. In 1941, SS Kurtuluş was leased by the Turkish government for humanitarian relief to be provided during the food crisis in Greece.

== Mission and aftermath ==
Greece experienced the Great Famine (Greek: Μεγάλος Λιμός) during the time the country was occupied by Nazi Germany starting April 1941, and blockaded by the Royal Navy. Today, the famine is generally believed to have caused the deaths of around 300,000 people of all ages, according to historian and researcher Mark Mazower.

The National Greek War Relief Association, formed in October 1940 by the Greek Orthodox Church, started to raise funds in the United States and to organize relief efforts to supply the population with food and medicine. The Allied high command were initially reluctant to lift the blockade, since it was the only form of pressure they had on the Axis powers. However, a compromise was reached to allow shipments of grain to come from the neutral Turkey, despite the fact that it was within the blockade zone.

Turkish President İsmet İnönü with the Turkish parliament and his government, signed a decision and initiated a mission to help the people whose army with which he had personally clashed and fought during the Turkish War of Independence 19 years prior. Turkey thus became the first to lend help to Greece officially, with a significant amount of support from several other organizations. Foodstuffs were collected by a nationwide campaign of Kızılay (Turkish Red Crescent) and the operation was mainly funded by the American Greek War Relief Association and the Hellenic Union of Constantinopolitans. Food supplies were sent to the port of Istanbul to be shipped to Greece. SS Kurtuluş was prepared for her voyage with big symbols of the Red Crescent painted on both sides.

After having received permission from London to cross the blockade zone, the ship left Karaköy Pier on 6 October 1941 for the first time. Upon landing in Piraeus, the port city near Athens, the International Red Cross took charge of unloading and distributing the foodstuffs. In the following months, SS Kurtuluş made three more voyages to Greece delivering a total of 6,735 tons of food aid.

=== Sinking and fate ===
During her fifth voyage, after having left Istanbul on 18 February, the old ship was caught in heavy weather and rough seas in the Sea of Marmara. During the stormy night of 20 February 1942, SS Kurtuluş was blown onto rocks off the coast near Saraylar village, north of Marmara Island. She sank the next morning at 9:15 after the accident. All 34 crew members reached Marmara Island. The place was later named Cape Kurtuluş in her memory.

Despite the loss of SS Kurtuluş, Turkey maintained its determination to help, and continued sending aid until 1946, with other ships, such as SS Dumlupınar, SS Tunç, SS Konya, SS Güneysu, and SS Aksu. One ship, SS Dumlupınar brought around 1,000 sick Greek children aged 13–16 to Istanbul to recuperate in a safe place.

== The documentary film ==
Turkish writer-researcher and film director Erhan Cerrahoğlu undertook research work to produce a documentary on SS Kurtuluş and on the relief campaign of which the ship was a part. The wreck site was identified in summer 2005, by diver Professor Erdoğan Okuş and his team. The shipwreck was found mostly demolished, and many of the wreckage parts were scattered across the seafloor.

The documentary film Barışı Taşıyan Vapur: Kurtuluş (SS Kurtuluş: The Steamship That Carried Peace) features images seen for the first time. The documentary debuted on 1 June 2006, during the 3rd International Istanbul Bunker Conference.
