= TSC Berlin 1893 (basketball) =

Turn-Sport-Club Berlin 1893 section Basketball is a basketball club, part of the eponymous multi-sports club, based in Berlin, Germany.

== History ==
The Club participated in the East Germany basketball league from 1953 to 1990 and the German reunification.

The men's team participated in the 1968–69 FIBA European Cup Winners' Cup and managed to play in the quarterfinals against AŠK Olimpija from Ljubljana (73–101 defeat away, 91–90 win in East Berlin).

The women's team became national champions two times in 1963 and 1967. The ladies participated in the 1963–64 FIBA Women's European Champions Cup and eliminated by the European powerhouse of Daugava Rīga with two easy defeats (48–72 in East Berlin, 38–66 in Riga). In 1967–68 the ladies of Berlin 1893 played again in the FIBA Women's European Champions Cup but eliminated just in the first round by the Polish ŁKS Łódź (56-51 home win, 53-70 away defeat).
