= Hyperinflation in Greece =

1940s period of hyperinflation

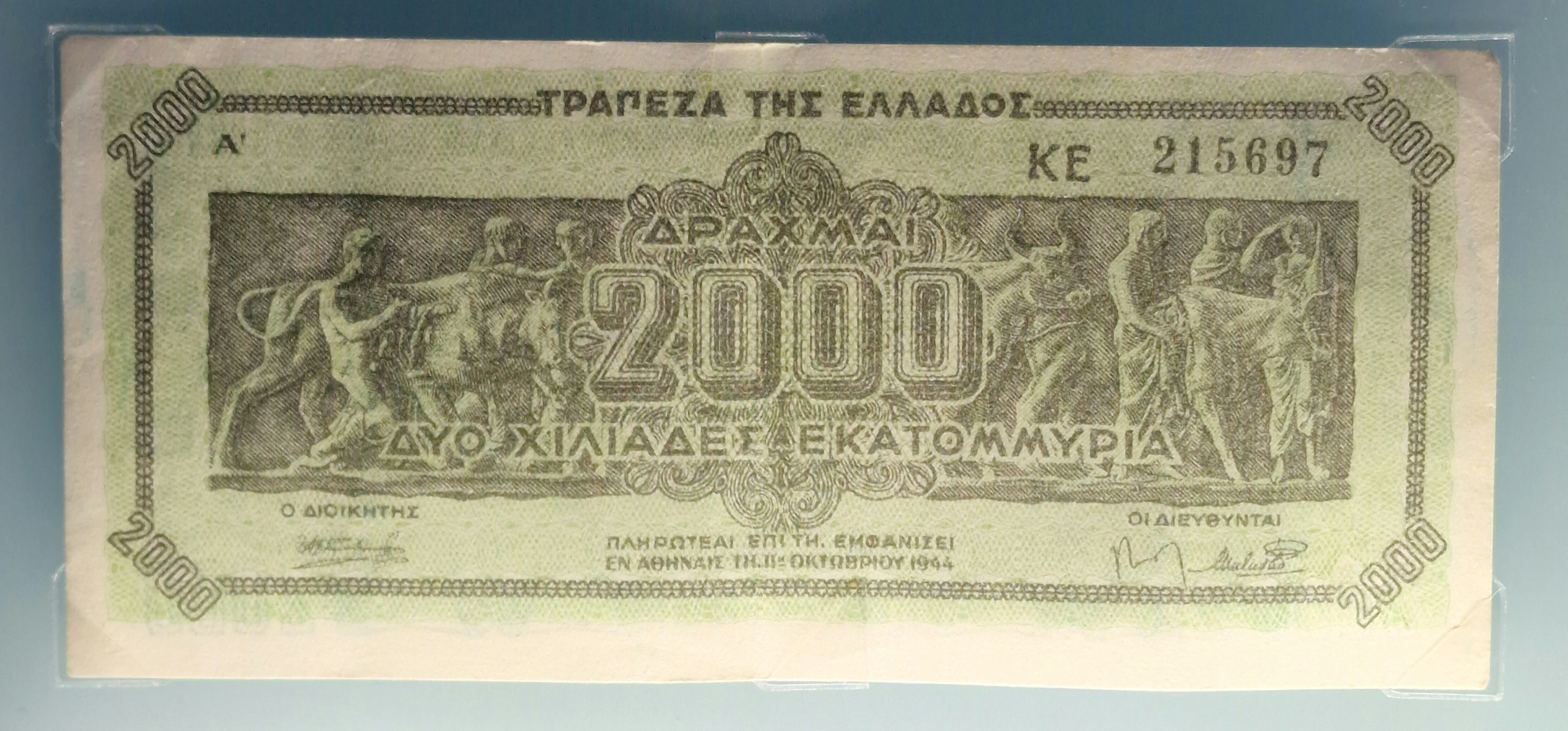
1944 2,000 million drachmai note, Numismatic Museum of Athens

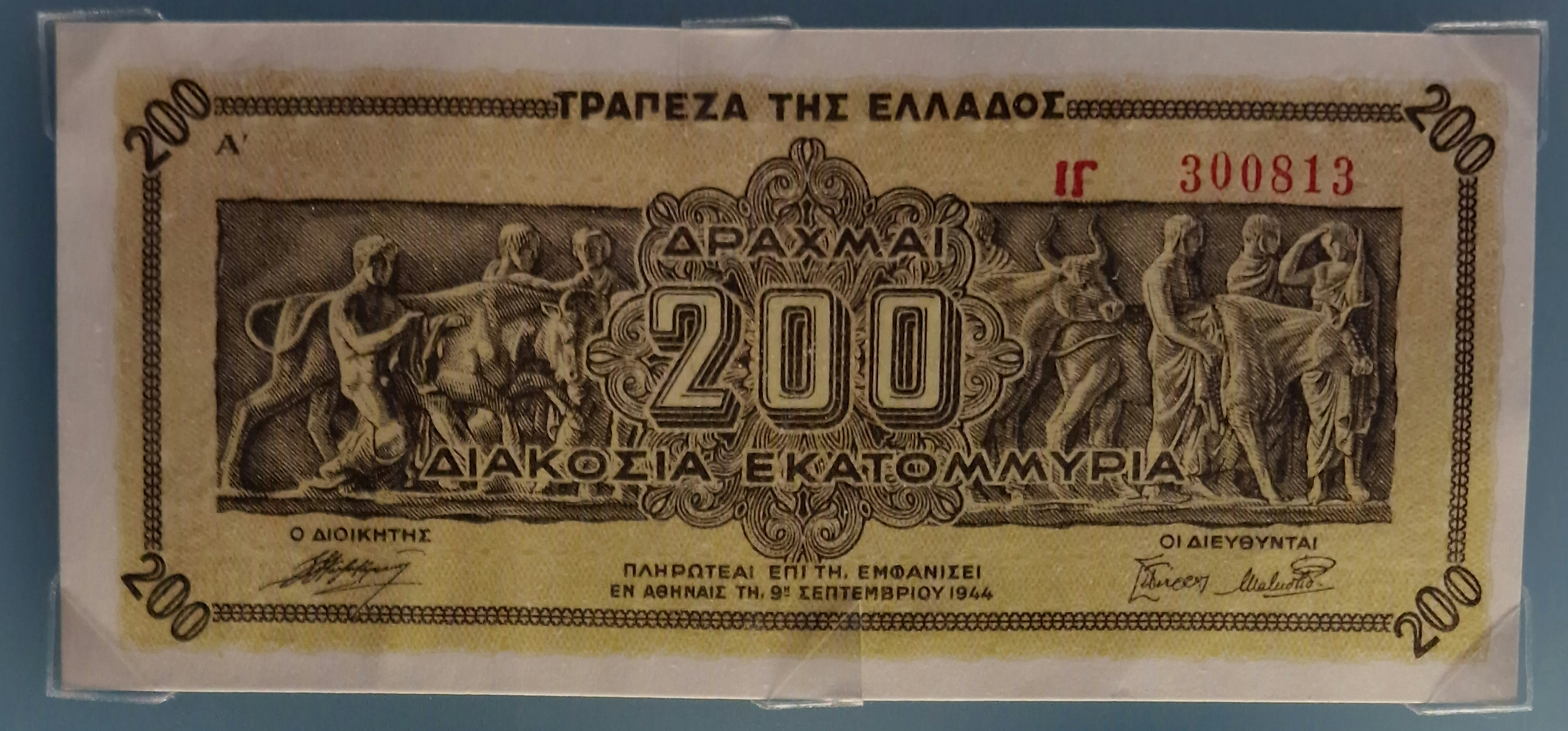
1944 200 million drachmai note, Numismatic Museum of Athens

Hyperinflation in Greece occurred between 1941 and 1946 during World War II and the Axis occupation. In the most comprehensive study, Michael R. Palairet of Central European University described it as an "extraordinary long fifty months hyperinflation". Palairet attributes its length to the fact that Greece’s governments in this era made no effort to tax and were consistently able to print as much money as they needed for finance. Opposing Palairet's study, other scholars calculate that the Greek hyperinflation lasted only for most of 1943 and 1944, with several others lasting longer. (Note: Cagan’s original study had the 1920s Soviet hyperinflation as the longest, whilst the 1992 to 1994 Yugoslav event has been calculated based upon this as lasting 24 months versus 13 for the Greek.)

== Background ==
Although in previous years Greece had been plagued by chronic budget deficits, before World War II Greece's finances under dictator Ioannis Metaxas, in power since 1936, became highly favourable, with the government running surpluses until the 1939–40 financial year. The roots of the Greek hyperinflation date back to October 1940, when the army of Fascist Italy invaded the country. During the following six months, Metaxas was fighting a war against the Italian army, and, clearly unable to raise sufficient taxes or rents, relied entirely on borrowing from the Bank of Greece, leading to an increase of 72 percent in the volume of drachma banknotes by April.

Inflation began to skyrocket in April 1941 when the Tsouderos government moved to London alongside Bank of Greece Governor Kyriakos Varvaresos and Deputy Governor Georgios Mantzavinos, both of whom were fired by the occupying powers. The country would be occupied by a coalition of Germany, Italy and Bulgaria, who would divide the country into three regions between which no movement of goods or people was permitted.

Once Greece was fully occupied, the Axis plundered all stocks of olive oil, olives, figs, and raisins, and mines for chromium, bauxite, manganese, molybdenum and nickel were handed over. The value of the drachma was initially set as low as possible so that the Axis obtained Greek exports as cheaply as possible, whilst at the same time Italian and German occupation money were also placed into circulation. Ultimately the “occupation currencies” were scrapped and the occupiers levied a monthly payment in drachma from the exiled central bank.

The effects of occupation produced a shift of activity to the black market, which further restricted government finance to printing money.

== Beginnings ==
Given that there was no way to cover the costs of the Axis governments by taxation — which Greeks had a tradition of resistance to — printing money became the only possible means. Monthly inflation would exceed 50% as early as May 1941, and it would remain high though erratic until the end of 1942, by when shops had long been emptied and clothing, shoes and medicine unobtainable.

In late 1942, the German occupiers attempted to curb the high inflation via a program launched by Hermann Neubacher, a longtime Nazi Party member and former mayor of Vienna. Neuberger would take the following steps:

- suspend all payments to Greek contractors working on Wehrmacht and Greek government contracts
- instruct all banks to restrict credit allocations
- ban all foodstuff exports
- increase non-fiscal taxation
- create DEGRIGES, a German–Greek trade corporation that monopolised trade between the two nations

Since the early period of Axis occupation, the drachma had changed from undervalued to overvalued, due to increased seignorage and government controls designed to make imports for the Axis occupiers cheap. Neuberger's moves would initially be quite successful: between November 1942 and February 1943 prices actually fell by five-eighths. However, it was always apparent that continuing printing of money would threaten to reverse this fall in prices, while the expectation of Greece being liberated from the Nazis was linked to public fear of renewed inflation.

== Establishment of hyperinflation ==
From the spring of 1943, prices began increasing again, as efforts were made to use Greek workers to provide for the German Reich rather than for the Greek population. As workers were diverted from producing goods, inflation returned and increased above 50% per month in October 1943 after the withdrawal of Italy from the country, although the rate of increase in the money supply remained stable for several months either side. Unlike the better-known hyperinflations in Germany and Hungary, studies have shown that during this period of the Greek hyperinflation feedback — contrary to conventional models of hyperinflation — was from inflation to money creation, so that increasing velocity of money was predating increases in seignorage.

Nevertheless, by the end of 1943, the quantity of drachma notes had increased 72-fold, while prices in terms of gold sovereigns 155-fold. As Greeks turned gradually towards gold instead of drachma notes for exchanges, and seignorage remained very high, the German occupation forced bought more and more gold for drachmas and inflation became worse and worse. It reached 534 percent per month in August 1944, and by October it was as high as 7,459 percent per month, or prices doubling every 4.23 days. Some sources suggest that at the absolute peak of hyperinflation prices doubled every 28 hours — comparable to Zimbabwe in the late 2000s. This was at the time the second-highest inflation rate for a month on record (Note: After that of the Weimar Republic in 1923.) and even today it is the fourth-worst on record. (Note: After that of Hungary in 1945–46, Zimbabwe in 2007–08, Yugoslavia between 1992 and 1994, and the Weimar Republic in 1923.)

=== Effects of the hyperinflation ===
Hyperinflation was disastrous for Greece's workers and peasants: real wages fell by over fifty percent between the invasion by Mussolini's Italy and the peak of inflation. The depletion of gold as stocks of goods fell with the departure of the Nazis further exacerbated shortages and forced businesses back to barter. Overall, the Nazis and other occupiers are believed to have collected 12,600,000,000 1940 drachmai, and hyperinflation was the main agent for transferring market power from natives to the Axis powers. Even the work of the Wehrmacht was effected: barter economies based around eggs of gold sovereigns developed even for small weapons like hand grenades.

By the peak of the hyperinflation, notes with face values as high as 100,000,000,000,000 (one hundred trillion) drachmai were issued, and it is estimated that the total quantity of drachma notes had increased by a factor of 826 million. Gold sovereigns largely replaced the drachma as a medium of exchange and store of value. Whereas in 1938 a drachma note was held for an average of forty days, by 1944 Greeks held drachma notes for an average of only four hours.

Another effect of hyperinflation was to increase the popularity of the Communist EAM, who would seize control of large areas of the country as Axis forces were pushed back by the Red Army.

== Stabilization attempts ==
=== Waley’s plan ===
At the height of the hyperinflation, Athens was placed under control of the British, (Note: During this period, most of Greece outside the capital was under the control of the EAM Communist movement.) the United States preferring a largely hands-off approach.

Sir David Waley was asked to develop a plan to stabilise the drachma. In November, Waley would develop a plan based upon the redenomination of the hyperinflated drachma at a ratio of 50,000,000,000 old drachmai to 1 new drachma, with the new drachma convertible to pounds sterling at a rate of 600 to one, although only for amounts larger than 12,000 new drachmai. This plan, accompanied by wage freezes at low levels, and the importation of gold sovereigns for the Bank of Greece to sell at fixed prices, would be carried out on 11 November. Prices, however, would continue to rise in the following seven months — by 140 percent in terms of consumer prices and as much as 800 percent in gold sovereign prices. Additionally, the gap between official and black market exchange rates, rose, and in the spring inflation further increased, with the gold standard rate surpassing 100 percent again during May 1945.

At an early stage, it was recognised that Waley's stabilization plan failed because there had been inadequate efforts to increase tax revenues or to prune the inefficient state bureaucracy. Also, efforts at gaining revenue via sale of foreign aid goods failed entirely: the costs of selling them marginally exceeded revenue therefrom. As early as two weeks after the announcement of the stabilization, total money supply had passed the planned maximum of 1,500,000,000 new drachmai in Athens alone, where the limited supply of goods put severe upward pressure onto prices.

=== Return of Varvaressos ===
The failure of the first plan to stabilise the drachma led to returned Bank of Greece governor Kyriakos Varvaressos devising a new plan on 4 June 1945, based upon radically raised direct taxation especially of corporate income, increased foreign aid, devalued the drachma, and severely controlled imports, prices and wages. Although Varvaressos’ plan supposedly insisted upon hard money, it was clear that it, like the previous plan of Waley, was not going to curb inflation because he could not countenance increases in indirect taxation, while the financial waste in the public sector was again not tackled. Moreover, the government was not able to ensure supplies of goods subject to price controls. Consequently, after an initial fall in prices, hyperinflation returned in the last three months of 1945, with monthly inflation in December of that year reaching over 120 percent.

Varvaressos would leave Greece in September 1945, upset that his plan had failed to stabilise the currency. As he left, Varvaressos blamed hoarders and uncompromising vested interests for undermining his economic plan. Observers said that “complete monetary anarchy” prevailed in the last quarter of 1945, while inflation accelerated again.

=== Establishment of the Currency Committee ===
The failure of the second stabilisation plan led to a combined plan by the British and American authorities still occupying Greece in early 1946. Known generally as the "Currency Committee", it was composed of the following:

1. The Minister of Financial Coordination, who officially headed it
2. The Governor of the Bank of Greece
3. The Minister of Finance
4. The Minister of Commerce and National Economy
5. Two foreign experts, one British and one American

Alongside the new committee, the government encouraged the Bank of Greece to sell gold sovereigns to the public. The plan was criticised severe by the still-powerful opposition Communist press, who viewed it as pure economic imperialism. Sale of gold sovereigns is estimated to have removed about a third of the sum of drachmai that would otherwise have been in circulation at the end of 1948. This was not enough to stabilise prices, which more than doubled between the end of 1945 and the end of 1948.

The British, however, would waive British wartime loans to Greece worth a total of 46 million pounds sterling, whilst the drachma was again devalued by fifty percent and import controls liberalised.

More critically, according to Gail Makinen, the British would radically reform the tax assessment and increase the price at which aid goods were sold, and maintain the devalued drachma exchange rate against both the pound sterling and US dollar. Inflation would stabilise for the rest of 1946. Although the effects of a bitter civil war meant that prices would increase significantly in 1947 and 1948, the memory of the wartime hyperinflation meant that the central government would establish a "Counterpart Fund" of drachmai obtained via the sale of foreign currency needed to buy economically critical capital imports, with the result that hyperinflation never returned.

== See also ==
- Hyperinflation in Brazil
- Hyperinflation in Zimbabwe
- Hyperinflation in the Weimar Republic
- Hyperinflation in Venezuela
