= Atatürk Swimming Complex =

Olympic-size swimming pools and centre in Adana, Southern Turkey

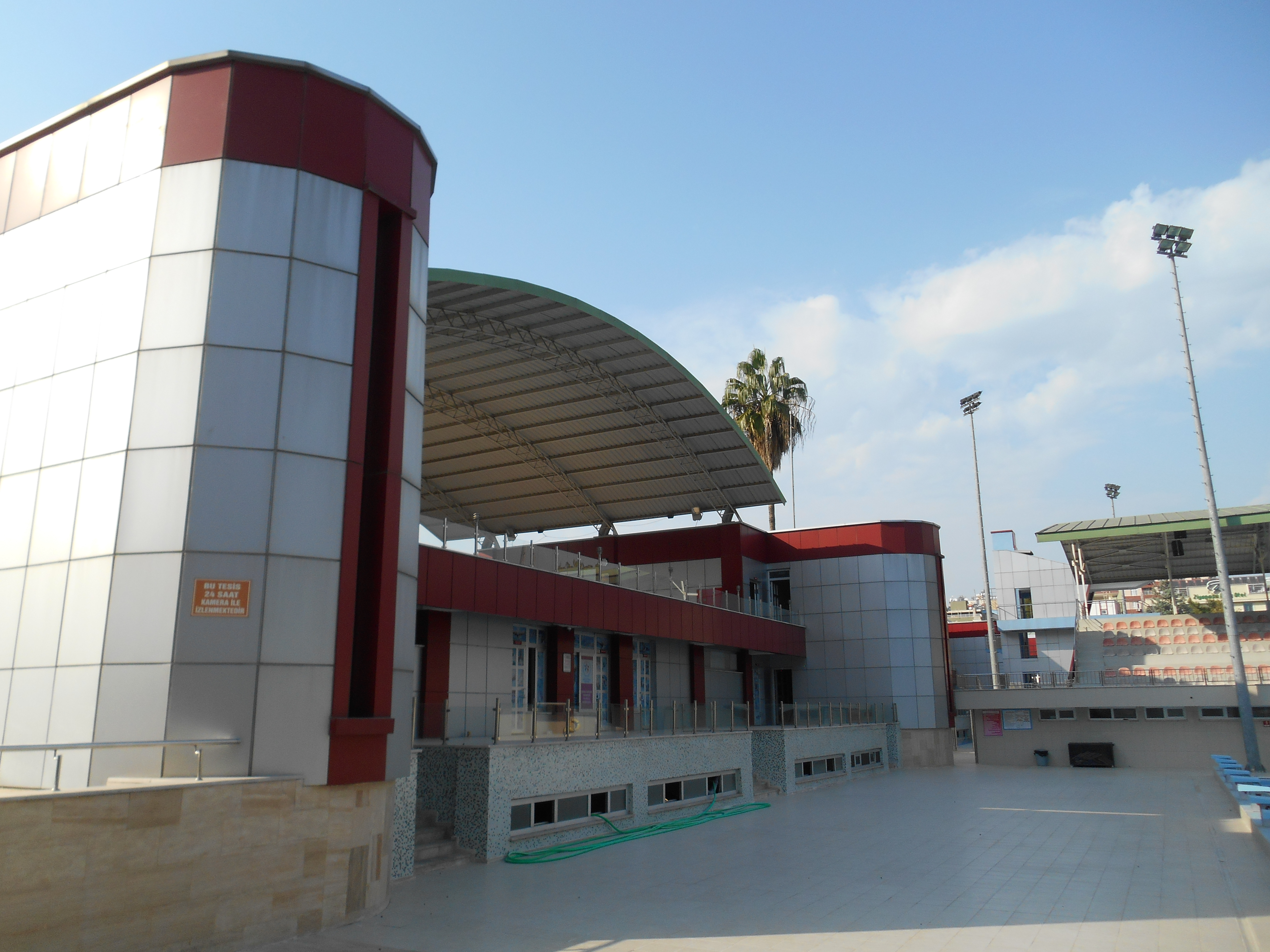
- Interactive map of Atatürk Swimming Complex
- Location: Seyhan, Adana, Turkey
- Coordinates: 36°59′46″N 35°19′15″E
- Owner: Republic of Turkey
- Operator: Adana Youth Services and Sports Directorate
- Capacity: 2200

Construction
- Opened: 1936
- Cost: 6.5 million TL (re-construction)

The Atatürk Swimming Complex is a swimming centre in Adana, featuring two outdoor Olympic-size swimming pools and an indoor semi-Olympic-size swimming pool. The building was opened in 1936, and re-constructed in 2009 at a cost of 6.5 million TL. The complex was the venue of the Adana Demirspor waterpolo team.

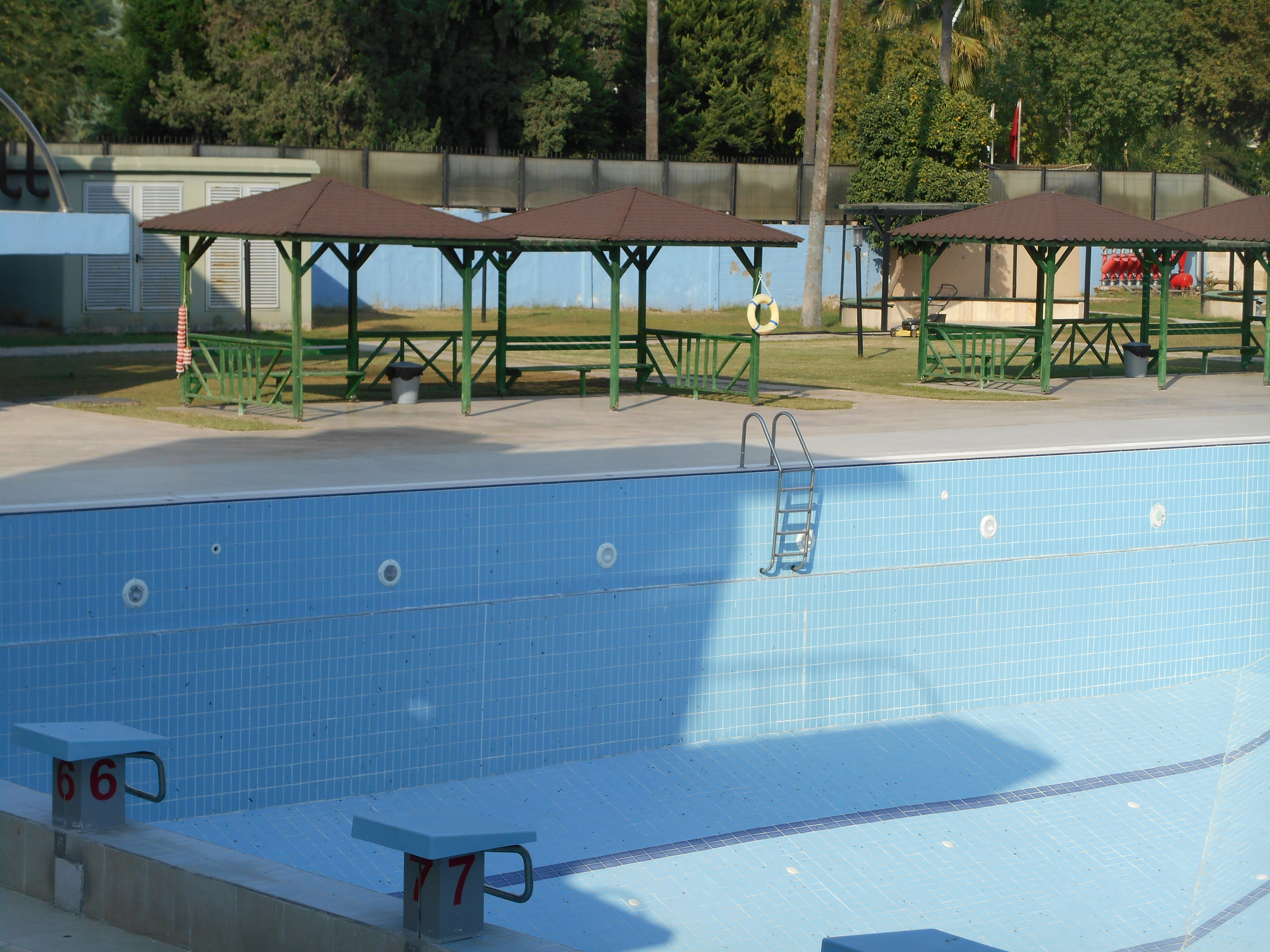
Atatürk Pool

Olympic length Atatürk swimming pool features:

- 10-lane
- 2.4 depth
- 5.5m high 3-storey diving tower (with elevator)
- 2200-seater Spectator Stands with Shelter

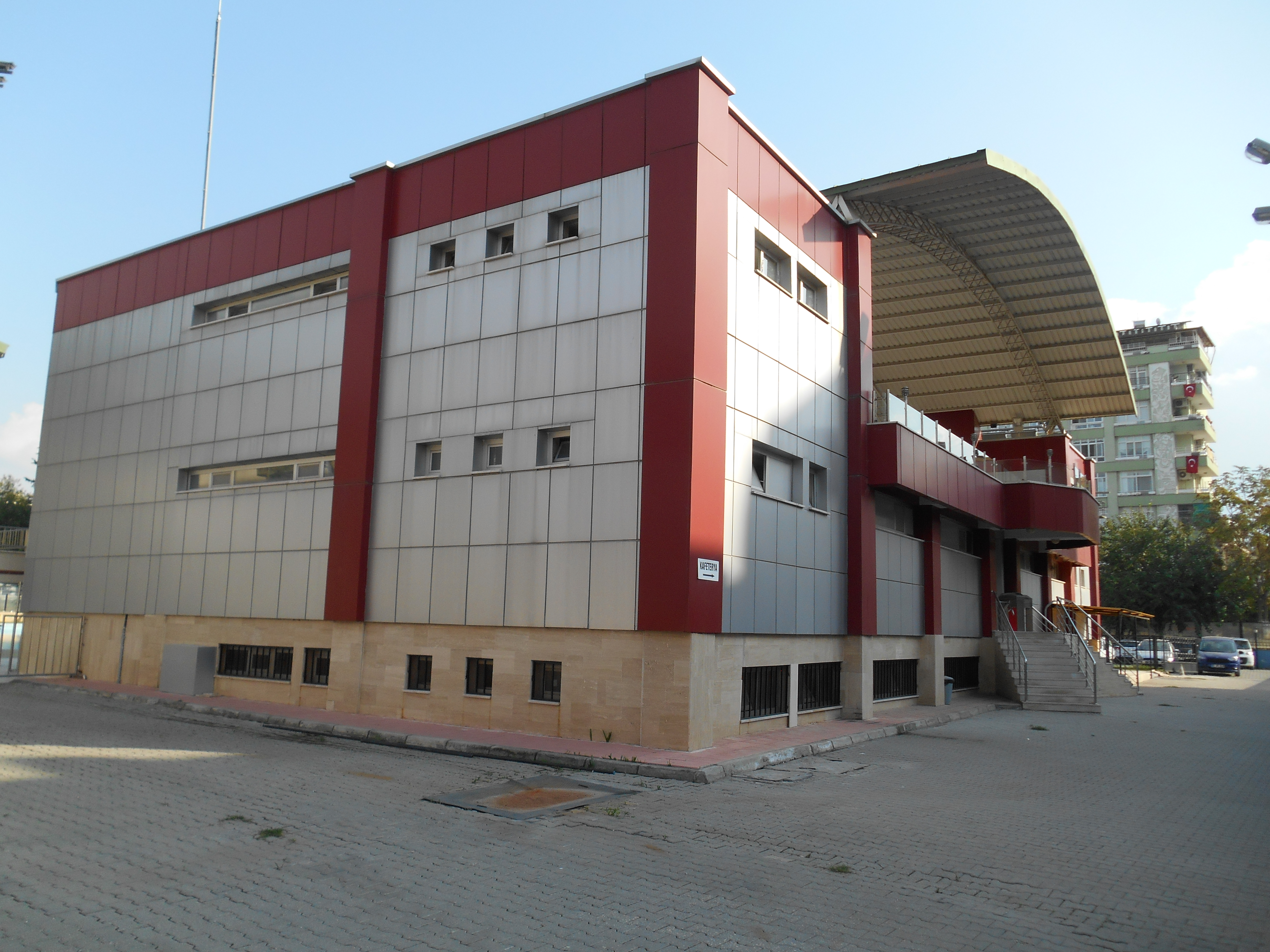
Yüzüncü Yıl Pool Building

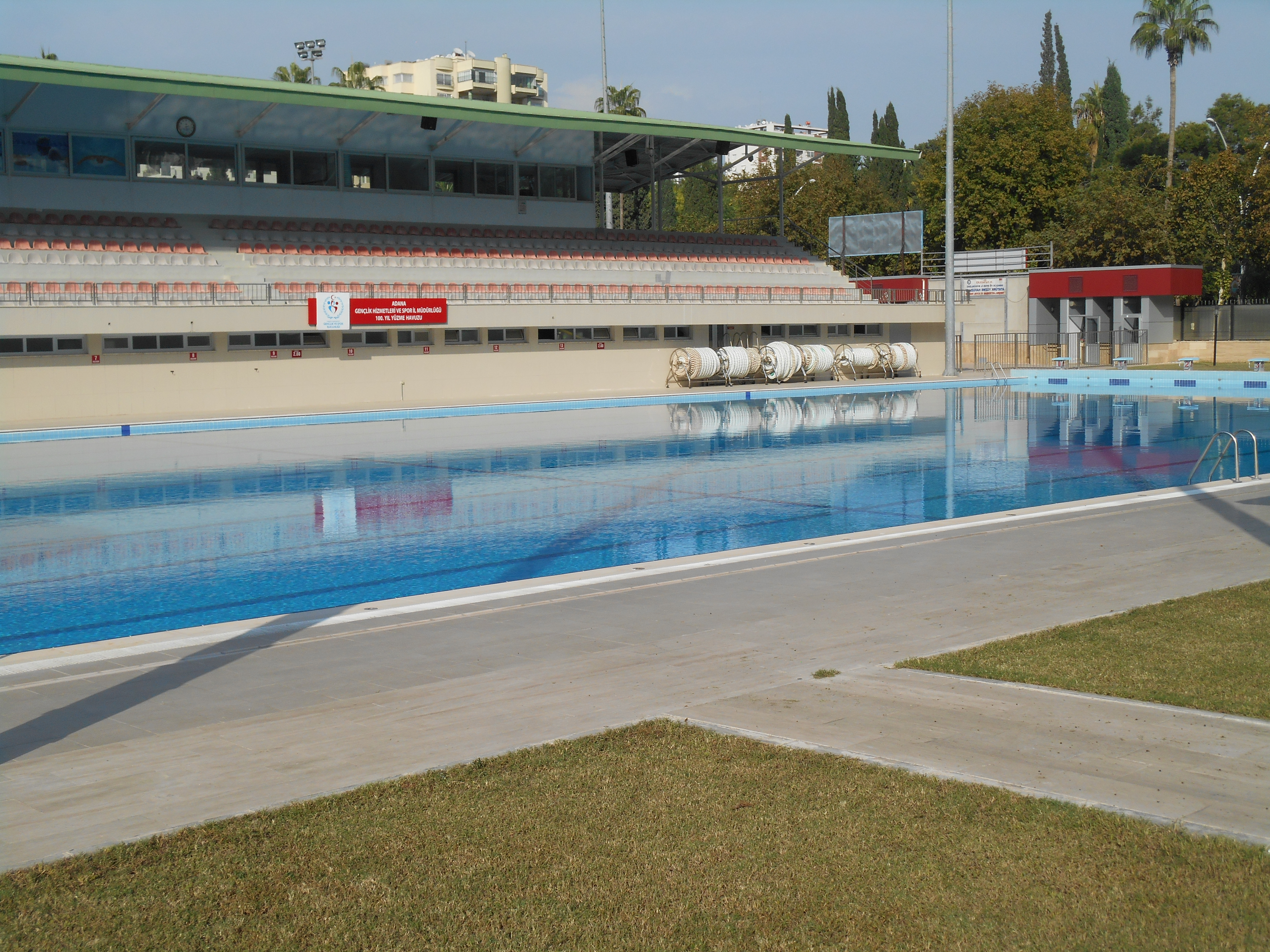
Yüzüncü Yıl Pool

Olympic length outdoor 100.Yıl swimming pool features:

- 10-lane
- 2.4 depth
- Spectator Stands with Shelter

Semi-olympic length indoor swimming pool features:

- 5-lane
- 1.8m depth

In addition, the fitness centre is equipped with cardiovascular conditioning equipment, strength training equipment, and free weights. The facility also includes two cafeterias, sauna and multi-purpose rooms.
