= Ali Haydar Şen =

Turkish businessperson

Ali Şen
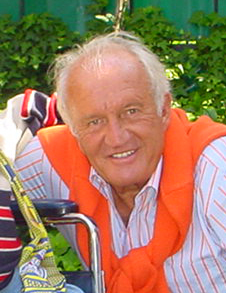

President of Fenerbahçe SK
- In office 12 April 1981 – 14 February 1998
- Preceded by: Razi Trak
- Succeeded by: Aziz Yıldırım

Personal details
- Born: 1939 (age 86–87) Prizren, Yugoslavia (modern Kosovo)

Ali Haydar Şen (born 1939) is a former president of the Turkish club Fenerbahçe SK.

== Early life ==
Şen was born to an ethnic Turkish family in Prizren, Kosovo (at the time Kingdom of Yugoslavia).

== Career ==
He worked as a journalist for a short time, before he first came to Fenerbahçe in 1975, when he was made the head of the club's basketball branch. On 12 April 1981, he was chosen as club president, taking the reins from Razi Trak.

During his first spell as club president, the club's football team won the league and cup double in the 1982–83 season, and his tenure ended on 10 December when he resigned. He had one more spell at the club, from December 1994 until 1998, with the football side again winning a championship a year after he came to power. He is famous for the then popular chant of club supporters, "Ali Şen başkan, Fenerbahçe şampiyon" (If Ali Şen is president, Fenerbahçe is victorious/champion).

In the 1995–96 season, goals from club legends Aykut Kocaman and Oğuz Çetin against Trabzonspor in the third last game of the season all but sealed the championship for Fenerbahçe. But it wasn't enough to convince Ali Şen, and at the end of the season, both players and Emre Aşık were sacked, leading to huge controversy amongst the club's faithful.

In late 1997, he announced that he would not run for a third time at the club. Next year, the presidency was taken over by Aziz Yıldırım.
