= Istanbul Women's Volleyball League =

Istanbul Women's Volleyball Championship
- Sport: Volleyball
- Founded: 1955
- Folded: 1984
- Country: Turkey
- Most titles: Eczacıbaşı VitrA (11)
- Website: tvf.org.tr

The Istanbul Women's Volleyball Championship (Turkish: İstanbul Kadınlar Voleybol Şampiyonası) is a defunct volleyball league competition of the volleyball teams from Istanbul in Turkey, run by the Turkish Volleyball Federation from 1955 to 1984.

== Champions ==
Season	Winner	Runner-up	3rd place
1954–55	İÜSK	Modaspor	Fenerbahçe
1955–56	Fenerbahçe	İÜSK	Modaspor
1956–57	Fenerbahçe	Galatasaray	
1957–58	Fenerbahçe	Galatasaray	İÜSK
1958–59	Fenerbahçe	Galatasaray	
1959–60	Galatasaray	Fenerbahçe	Rasimpaşa
1960–61	Fenerbahçe	Galatasaray	Rasimpaşa
1961–62	Galatasaray	Rasimpaşa	Fenerbahçe
1962–63	Galatasaray	Fenerbahçe	Rasimpaşa
1963–64	Galatasaray	Rasimpaşa	Fenerbahçe
1964–65	Galatasaray	Beşiktaş	Fenerbahçe
1965–66	Galatasaray	Rasimpaşa	Fenerbahçe
1966–67	Rasimpaşa	Galatasaray	Fenerbahçe
1967–68	Fenerbahçe	Galatasaray	Beşiktaş
1968–69	Fenerbahçe	Galatasaray	Beşiktaş
1969–70	Eczacıbaşı VitrA	Fenerbahçe	Galatasaray
1970–71	Fenerbahçe	Eczacıbaşı VitrA	Galatasaray
1971–72	Fenerbahçe	Eczacıbaşı VitrA	Galatasaray
1972–73	Fenerbahçe	Eczacıbaşı VitrA	Galatasaray
1973–74	Eczacıbaşı VitrA	Fenerbahçe	Galatasaray
1974–75	Eczacıbaşı VitrA	Fenerbahçe	Galatasaray
1975–76	Eczacıbaşı VitrA	Galatasaray	Doğuşspor
1976–77	Eczacıbaşı VitrA	Galatasaray	Fenerbahçe
1977–78	Galatasaray	Eczacıbaşı VitrA	Vinylex
1978–79	Eczacıbaşı VitrA	Büyükdere Boronkay	Galatasaray
1979–80	Eczacıbaşı VitrA	Arçelik	Galatasaray
1980–81	Eczacıbaşı VitrA	Arçelik	Galatasaray
1981–82	Eczacıbaşı VitrA	Arçelik	
1982–83	Eczacıbaşı VitrA	Arçelik	Ankara Pazarları
1983–84	Eczacıbaşı VitrA	Arçelik	Ankara Pazarları

== All champions ==
Team	Winner	Runners-up
Eczacıbaşı VitrA	11	4
Fenerbahçe	10	5
Galatasaray	7	9
Rasimpaşa	1	3
ÜSBK	1	1
