= Kurtuluş (surname) =

Kurtuluş is a Turkish surname means “salvation, liberation”. Notable people with the surname include:

- Edvin Kurtulus (born 2000), Kosovan footballer
- İlknur Kurtuluş (born 1972), Turkish female hand ball coach
- Mehmet Kurtuluş (born 1972), German actor of Turkish descent
- Serdar Kurtuluş (born 1987), Turkish footballer
- Serkan Kurtuluş (born 1990), Turkish footballer
- Tekin Kurtuluş (born 1968), German actor of Turkish descent
- Yekta Kurtuluş (born 1985), Turkish footballer
- Yusuf Kurtuluş (born 1986), Turkish footballer
