= Modaspor (basketball) =

- Location: Kadıköy, Istanbul, Turkey
- Team colors: White and Navy blue
- President: Esat Polat
- Championships: 3 Turkish Basketball Championships; 1 Istanbul Championship
- Website: modaspor.net

Modaspor basketball team (Turkish: Modaspor basketbol takımı) is the amateur basketball department of the Turkish sports club Modaspor, based in the district of Kadıköy, Istanbul. The team competes in the Istanbul Men's Amateur League.

== History ==
The basketball team of Modaspor was founded in 1946 and soon became one of the most successful Turkish basketball teams in the 1950s. The club managed to win the Turkish Basketball Championship in 1954, 1955, and 1958 and won the Istanbul Basketball League in the 1958–59 season. Modaspor became the first Turkish club to represent Turkey in the inaugural season of the newly founded FIBA European Champions Cup.

== Honours ==
- Turkish Championship
  - Winners (3): 1954, 1955, 1958
  - Runners-up (1): 1959
- Istanbul League
  - Winners (1): 1958–59
