= Kurtuluş S.K. =

Association football clubs established in 1896

- Full name: Kurtuluş Spor Kulübü
- Founded: 1 January 1896; 129 years ago as İraklis Jimnastik Kulübü
- Dissolved: Active
- Chairman: Konstantin Belalidis
Home colours

Kurtuluş S.K. is a sports club of Kurtuluş, Şişli district, Istanbul, Turkey. Its men's basketball team competes in the fifth tier İstanbul Büyük Erkekler Basketbol Ligi

== History ==
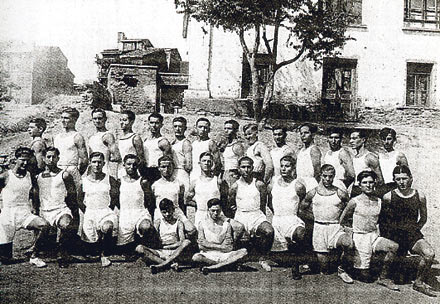
Gymnasts of the club

Kurtuluş S.K. was founded ατ 1896 under the name Hercules (Greek: Ηρακλής, Turkish: İraklis Jimnastik Kulübü) by local Greeks in 1896. It was the first club in Istanbul exclusively dedicated to sports activities. Later in 1934 it was forced to change its name to Turkish, Kurtuluş.

It was one of the major Greek sports clubs in Istanbul, while from 1910 to 1922 it was one of the clubs that undertook the organization of the Pan-Constantinopolitan games (Games organized among the Greek clubs of the city).

In 1906 two athletes of the club, the brothers Georgios and Nikolaos Alimbrandis won gold medals in the Intercalated Olympic Games in Athens, in horizontal bar and rope climbing respectively.

During the 1930s, the club intensified the efforts in the field of sports with the foundation of basketball, volleyball, cycling, athletics and other sports departments. Competent athletes from these departments were distinguished in local and international sports events. The club played in the Turkish Basketball League between 1966 and 1968.

== Notable athletes ==
- Minas Gekos, basketball player

== See also ==
- Beyoğluspor, another still existing sports club in Istanbul founded by local Greeks.
- List of Turkish sports clubs by foundation dates
