= Fenerbahçe S.K. =

Turkish professional sports club

- Full name: Fenerbahçe Spor Kulübü
- Nicknames: Sarı-Lacivertliler (The Yellow-Navy Blues); Sarı Kanaryalar (The Yellow Canaries); Efsane (The Legend); Cumhuriyet (The Republic)
- Short name: FB; Fener
- Sport: Multiple
- School: Fenerbahçe University
- Founded: 3 May 1907; 119 years ago as Phener-Bagtche Football Club (Note: Although it is known that the club was founded in the spring of 1907, the day and month are unknown, 3 May was chosen to honor Mustafa Kemal Ataturk's visit of the club in 1918.)
- Based in: Istanbul, Turkey
- Home ground: Şükrü Saracoğlu Stadium; Ülker Sports Arena
- Colors: Yellow and Navy blue
- Anthem: Yaşa Fenerbahçe (Viva Fenerbahçe)
- President: Aziz Yıldırım
- Secretary: Orhan Demirel
- Club titles: Intercontinental titles: 1 European titles: 18; Balkan titles: 3
- Mascot: Yellow canary
- Local media: Fenerbahçe TV
- Website: www.fenerbahce.org

Fenerbahçe Spor Kulübü (Turkish pronunciation: [feˈnæɾbahtʃe], Fenerbahçe Sports Club), commonly known as Fenerbahçe or colloquially Fener, is a Turkish professional multi-sport club based in Istanbul, Turkey. Fenerbahçe is parent to a number of different competitive departments including football, basketball, volleyball, table tennis, athletics, swimming, sailing, boxing, rowing, and eSports, which have won both international and domestic titles over the club's history. Some departments also have parasports divisions.

Fenerbahçe is one of the oldest and most successful multi-sport clubs in Turkey, having won 22 international titles, including 18 major European titles, one World championship, three regional Balkan titles and numerous Mediterranean titles across five sport departments. It is among the few clubs in Europe to have won titles across multiple departments.

Fenerbahçe is one of the most supported Turkish clubs with millions of fans inside Turkey and all over the world. The club has 309,026 paid members as of 2012 while having 55.000 congress members as of 2025.

In its 101st year of 2008; with a market value of $2 billion, it surpassed Manchester United to become the world's most valuable club. Also, in March 2008, Fenerbahçe's record application was accepted by Guinness World Records, which envisages Fenerbahçe to have the highest number of medal and trophy achievements on the planet with its 9 departments entirely, a total of 1134 cups and medals.

== History ==
=== Foundation and early history ===
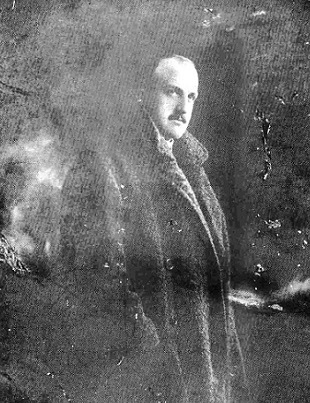
Ziya Songülen, the founder and first president

Fenerbahçe was founded as a football club in 1907 in Istanbul, Ottoman Empire, by Ziya Songülen, Ayetullah Bey, and Necip Okaner. This group of individuals founded the club secretly in order to keep a low profile and not get into any trouble with the strict Ottoman rule. So strict that the Sultan, Abdul Hamid II, forbade the Turkish youth to set up a club or engage in the game of football played by the English families that was watched in envy. Ziya Songülen was elected the first President of the club, Ayetullah Bey became the first General Secretary, and Enver Necip Okaner was given the post of the General Captain.

The club's name comes from a neighbourhood in Istanbul. The name literally means "lighthouse garden" in Turkish (from fener, meaning "lighthouse", and bahçe, meaning "garden"), referring to a historic lighthouse located at Fenerbahçe Cape. The location was a big influence on the design of the club's first crest as well, which sported the yellow white colours of daffodils and the leaf of oaks around the lighthouse. The first kits were also designed with yellow and white stripes. The crest and the colours of the club were changed in 1910 when Hikmet Topuzer redesigned the badge and Ziya Songülen changed the colours to yellow and navy, from then on the iconic colours of the club. Fenerbahçe's activities were kept in secrecy until a legislation reform in 1908, when, under a new law, all football clubs had to register to exist legally.

Fenerbahçe joined the Istanbul League in 1909, finishing fifth in their first year. The founding line-up included Ziya Songülen, Ayetullah Bey, Necip Okaner, Galip Kulaksızoğlu, Hassan Sami Kocamemi, Asaf Beşpınar, Enver Yetiker, Şevkati Hulusi Bey, Fuat Hüsnü Kayacan, Hamit Hüsnü Kayacan, and Nasuhi Baydar. Fenerbahçe played against the staff of the Royal Navy that occupied Istanbul during the Turkish War of Independence. Some British soldiers formed football teams that were named after the players' speciality, for example Essex Engineers, Irish Guards, Grenadiers, and Artillery. These teams played against each other and against local football teams in Istanbul. Fenerbahçe won many of these matches. General Harrington Cup, named after the commander of the British occupation forces in Istanbul, was a football tournament held in Istanbul in 1923. Local football teams and teams formed by the occupying forces participated in the tournament. In the final match which was played at Taksim Stadium on 1923, Fenerbahçe and the British occupation forces team faced each other. Fenerbahçe won this match 2-1 and got the cup. As a result of the Kuşdili Fire that occurred on the night of 1932, the club lost all its material artifacts and documents, including trophies, membership records, and match books. Consequently, May 3, the day Atatürk visited the club's clubhouse for the first time in 1918, was adopted as its founding day. It is being claimed that he was a supporter of Fenerbahçe.

In 1910, the club's infamous rowing department and sailing department were founded. In 1913, the basketball branch was founded, along with its athletics department and swimming department, the former being the first basketball team established within a sports club in the Ottoman Empire. In 1928; both men's and women's volleyball departments were founded along with the table tennis team.

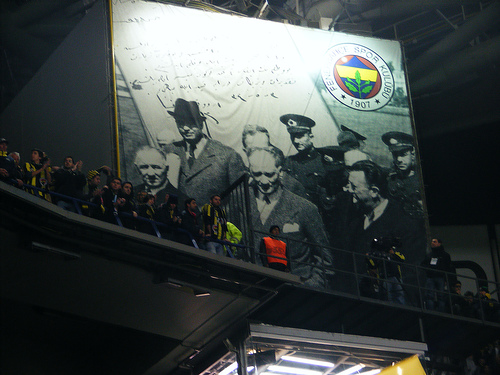
Picture of Atatürk during his visit to the club

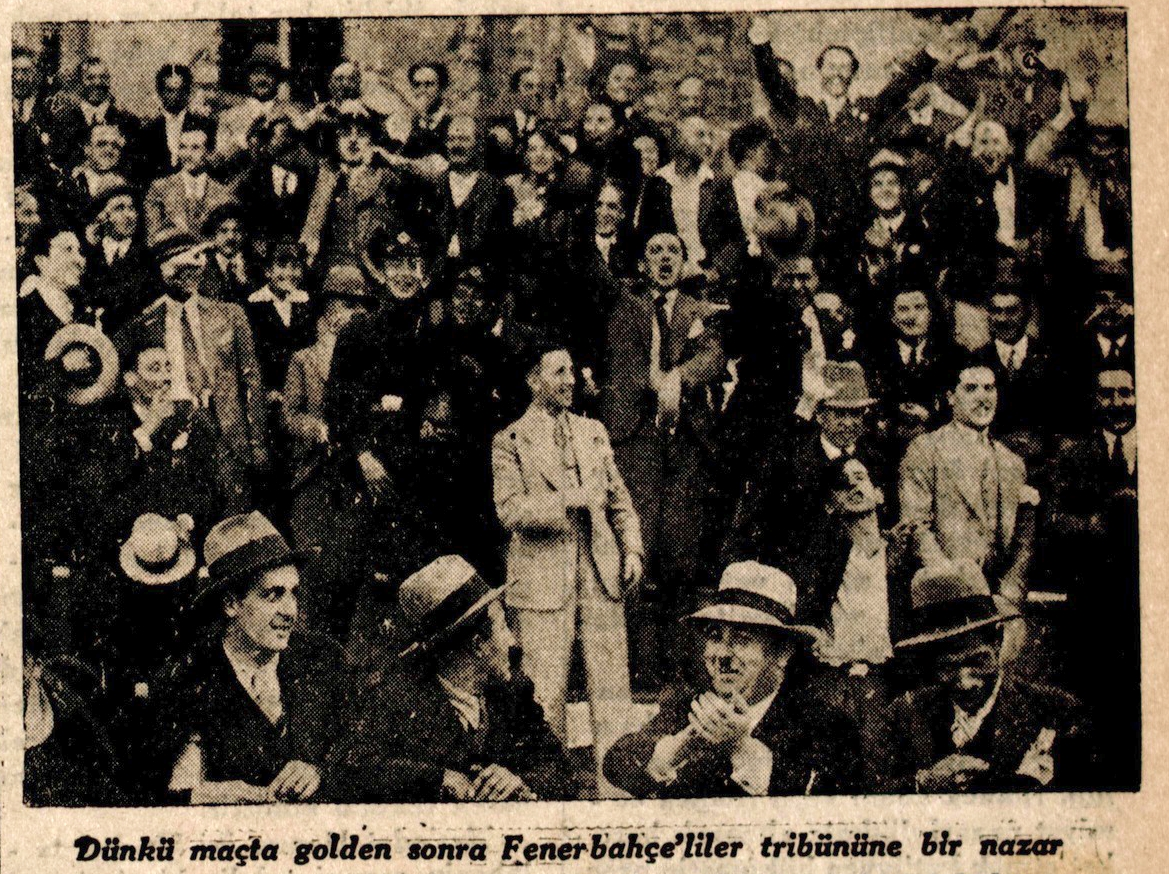
Fenerbahçe fans at Taksim Stadium during the Fenerbahçe-Galatasaray match in the Akşam newspaper dated 28 May 1932

=== Branch outlines ===
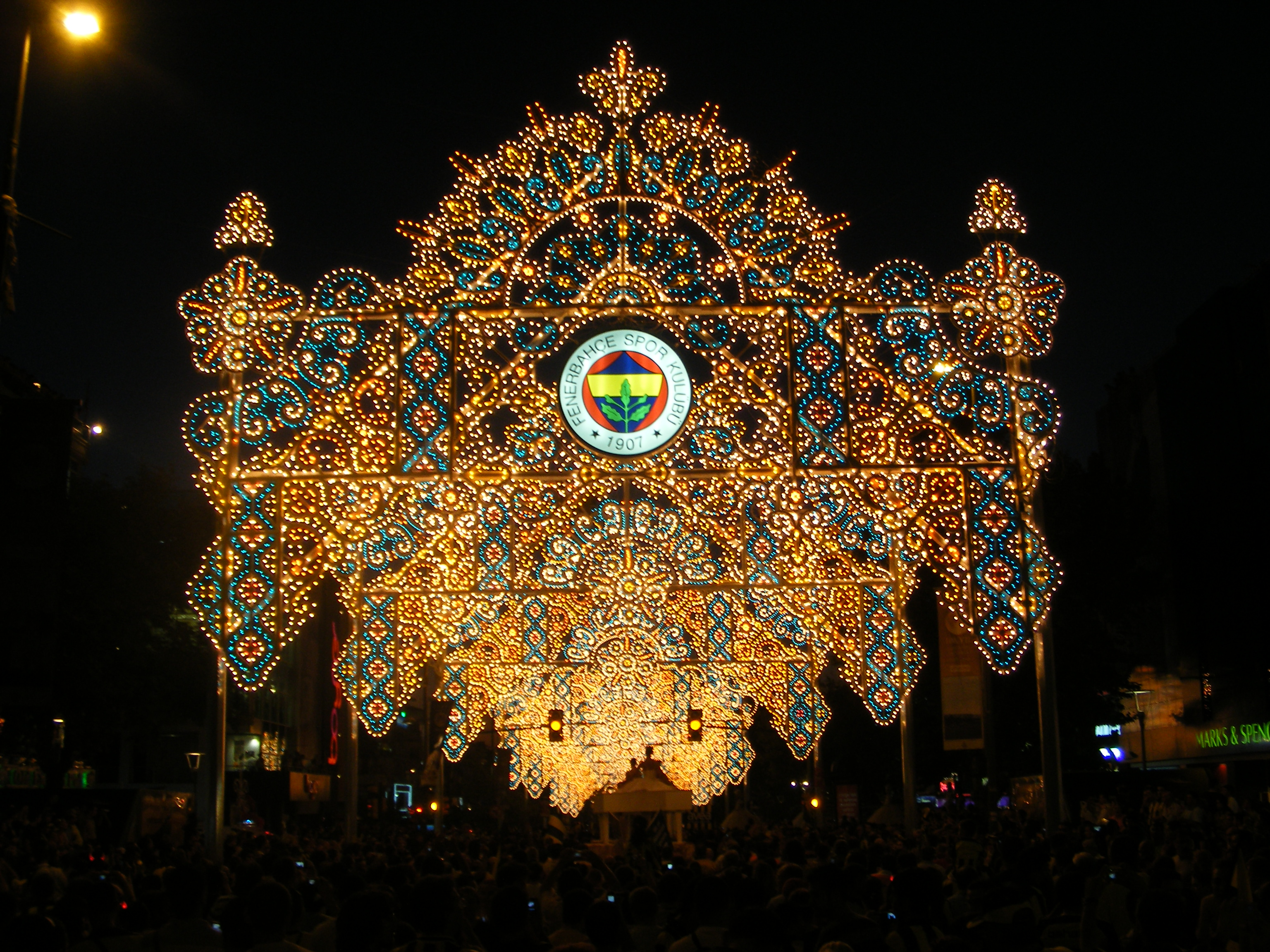
100th year celebrations

The men's football department is the most known of the club and has won a total of 54 domestic trophies, including a record 28 Turkish championship titles (19 Turkish Super League, six National Division, and three Turkish Football Championship titles), among others, which make the club the most successful in the country. The club is also leading the all-time table of the Turkish Super League. In international club football, Fenerbahçe won the Balkans Cup in 1968, the first international trophy won by a Turkish football team.

The men's basketball team is one of the most successful in Turkey and also has one of the highest rankings in Europe, being the first team in Turkish basketball history to have won the EuroLeague and a match against an NBA team. They became European champions in the 2016–17 season and runners-up in 2015–16 and 2017–18. The club have played in five consecutive EuroLeague Final Fours (2015, 2016, 2017, 2018, 2019) so far, which is also a Turkish record. They won another F4 in 2023.

In 2023, the women's basketball team won the EuroLeague by defeating ÇBK Mersin Yenişehir 99–60 in the all-Turkish final. By achieving this feat, Fener became the first and only sports club in history to be crowned European champions in both men's and women's basketball. Eventually in the same year, Fenerbahçe became the first and only Turkish club to date to win the FIBA Europe SuperCup by crushing France's LDLC ASVEL Féminin on their own homeground with a dominating victory and a point differential of 57, a record in the SuperCup's history.

In volleyball, Fenerbahçe became the first Turkish club ever to be crowned World champions in an Olympic team sport, by winning the FIVB Volleyball Women's Club World Championship undefeated in 2010. They also were crowned European Champions by winning the CEV Champions League in the 2011–12 season, having reached the final before in 2010. Furthermore, they won the CEV Cup in 2014.

The men's volleyball team won the CEV Challenge Cup, also in the 2013–14 season, thus writing volleyball history as the women's team won another continental title, the aforementioned CEV Cup, the very same day. By achieving this unparalleled feat, Fenerbahçe became the only sports club in Turkey and one of few in Europe with European titles won in both the men's and women's volleyball departments. They also became Balkan Champions in 2009 and 2013.

The table tennis department of Fenerbahçe is the best in Turkey and one of the best in Europe, with the women's team having won the ETTU Cup two times in a row, in the 2011–12 and 2012–13 seasons, which is a Turkish record. They became the only Turkish team that played in a European Champions League Final, and they won the Champions League title in 2015 undefeated, thus achieving the only Triple Crown ever for a Turkish table tennis team. The men's team reached the final of the ETTU Cup in 2008, which is the best result for any Turkish team to date.

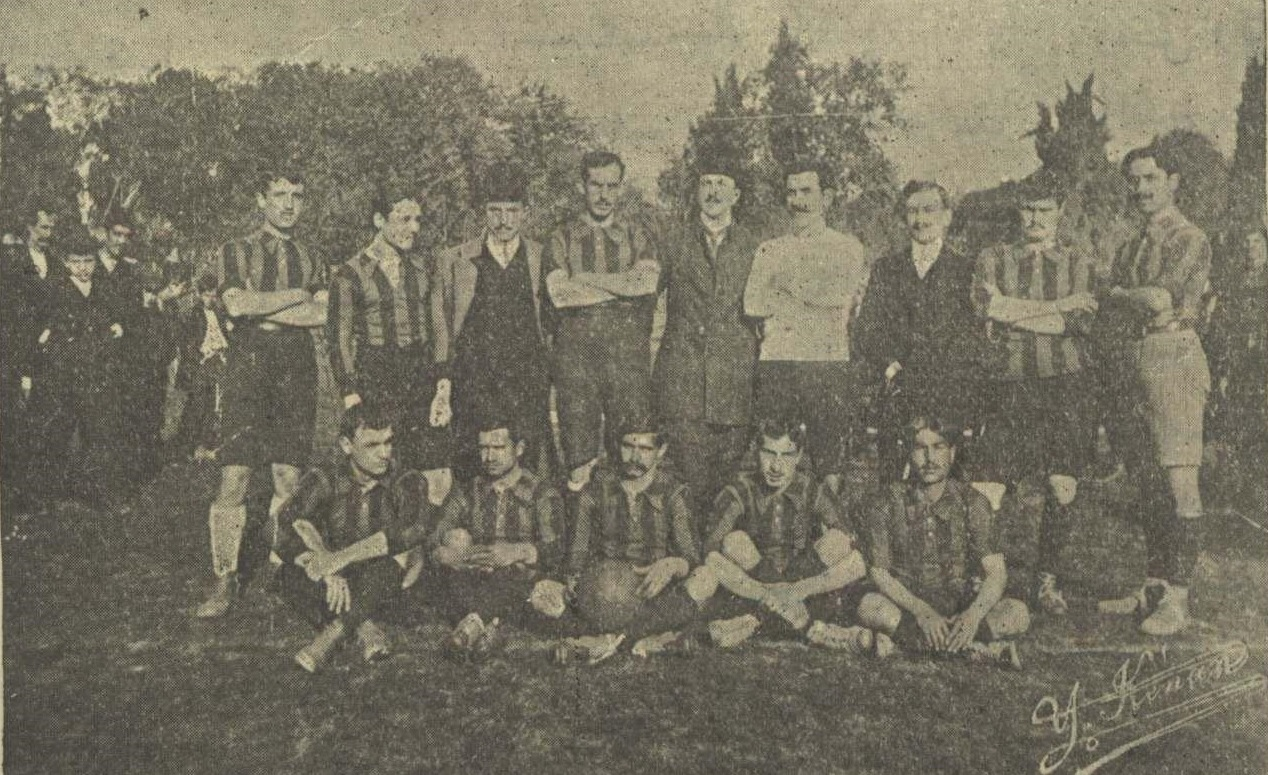
The first men's football team, in the 1907-08 season

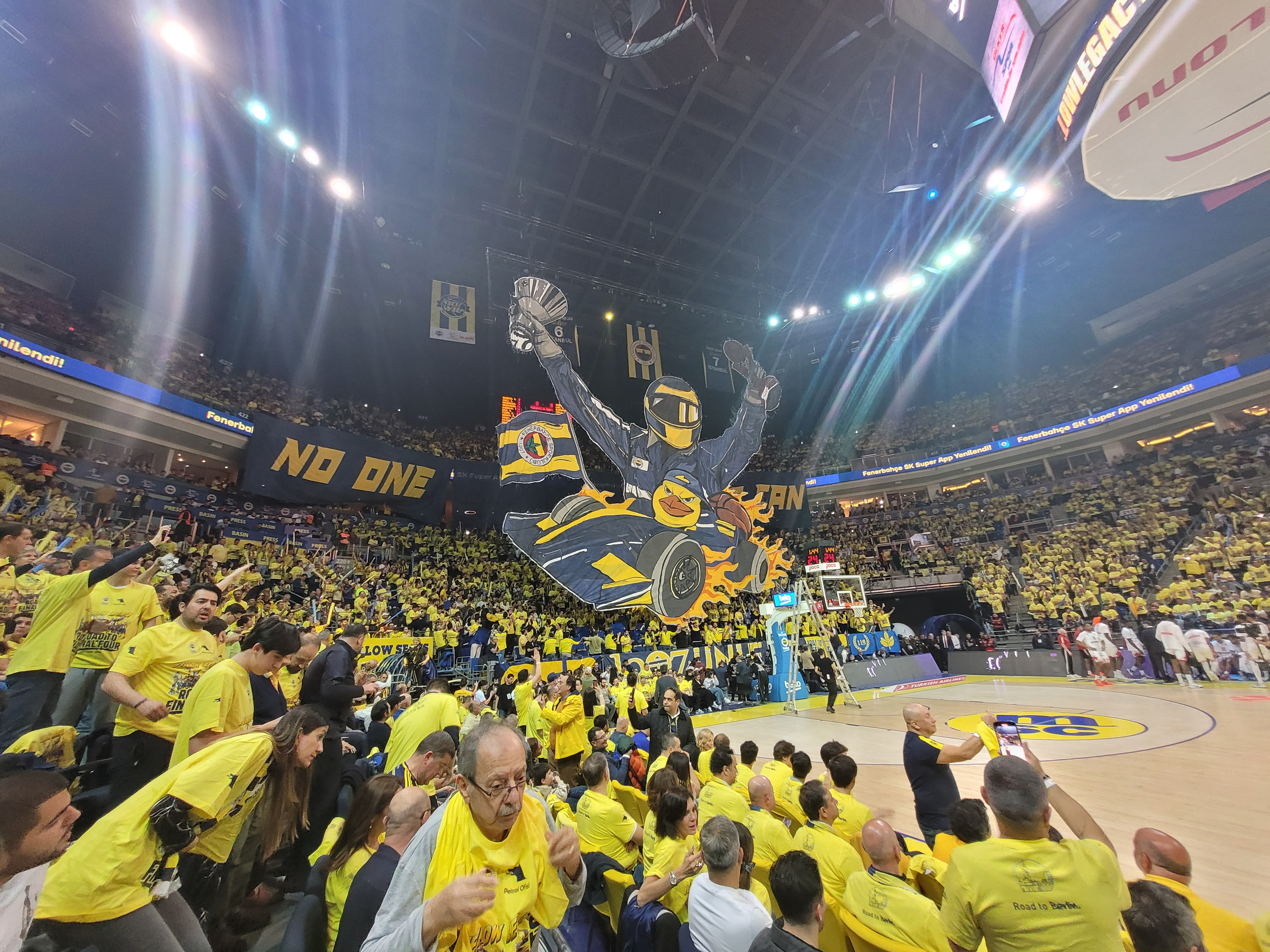
A choreography during a EuroLeague Basketball match

=== Club crest and colours ===
Former crest of Fenerbahçe (1907–1928, Ottoman Turkish: فنارباغچه سپور قلوبی)

Since the club's foundation, Fenerbahçe has used the same badge, which has only undergone minor alterations.

It was designed by Hikmet Topuzer, nicknamed Topuz Hikmet, who played as left winger, in 1910, and had made as lapel pins by Tevfik Haccar Taşçı (then Tevfik Haccar) in London. The crest consists of five colours. The white section which includes the writing Fenerbahçe Spor Kulübü ★ 1907 ★ represents purity and open-heartedness, the red section represents love and attachment to the club and symbolises the Turkish flag. The yellow section symbolises other ones' envy and jealousy about Fenerbahçe, while the navy symbolises nobility. The oak leaf which rises from the navy and yellow section shows the force and the power of being a member of Fenerbahçe. The green colour of the leaf shows the success of Fenerbahçe is imperative. Hikmet Topuzer describes the story of the emblem as below:

After the change of the club's colours from yellow and white to yellow and navy, it was an issue to create an emblem with our new colours. My friends left the design of this emblem to me. Firstly, I brought together the colours of our national flag, red and white. Then drew a heart shape over the red and gave it a yellow and navy colour, adding an acorn leaf that represents resistance, power and strength. I wrote the club name and foundation date on the white section. When drawing our emblem, I tried to give this meaning: Serving the club with dependence from heart. The design was favored by my friends and our new emblem was made through the guidance of Tevfik Haccar, who was in Germany at time. After the new alphabet was approved, the design was protected, but the club name on the emblem was changed to Fenerbahçe Spor Kulübü ★ 1907 ★.

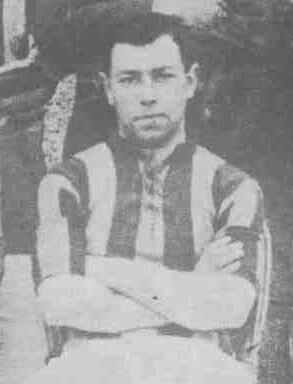
Hikmet Topuzer

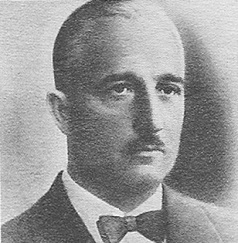
Tevfik Haccar Taşçı

The cover of the Ottoman sports magazine İdman with Fenerbahce's original color tones (28 June 1913)

== European and worldwide honours ==
Sport	Competition	Result	Year
Men's football	Balkans Cup	Winners	1968
Women's boxing	European Champions Cup	Runners-up	1999
Women's basketball	EuroCup Women	Runners-up	2004–05
Men's table tennis	ETTU Cup	Runners-up	2007–08
Men's volleyball	Balkan Cup	Winners	2009
Women's volleyball	CEV Women's Champions League	Runners-up	2009–10
Women's volleyball	FIVB Volleyball Women's Club World Championship	Winners	2010
Women's volleyball	CEV Women's Champions League	Winners	2011–12
Women's table tennis	ETTU Cup	Winners	2011–12
Women's table tennis	ETTU Cup	Winners	2012–13
Women's volleyball	Women's CEV Cup	Runners-up	2012–13
Women's basketball	EuroLeague Women	Runners-up	2012–13
Women's basketball	EuroLeague Women	Runners-up	2013–14
Men's volleyball	Balkan Cup	Winners	2013
Men's volleyball	CEV Challenge Cup	Winners	2013–14
Women's volleyball	Women's CEV Cup	Winners	2013–14
Women's table tennis	European Champions League	Runners-up	2013–14
Women's table tennis	European Champions League	Winners	2014–15
Women's athletics	European Champion Clubs Cup	Runners-up	2015
Men's basketball	Euroleague	Runners-up	2015–16
Women's basketball	EuroLeague Women	Runners-up	2016–17
Men's basketball	EuroLeague	Winners	2016–17
Men's basketball	EuroLeague	Runners-up	2017–18
Men's athletics	European Champion Clubs Cup	Runners-up	2019
Wheelchair basketball	EuroCup 3	Winners	2019
Women's basketball	EuroLeague Women	Runners-up	2021–22
Women's basketball	EuroLeague Women	Winners	2022–23
Wheelchair basketball	EuroCup 2	Winners	2023
Women's basketball	FIBA Europe SuperCup Women	Winners	2023
Women's basketball	EuroLeague Women	Winners	2023–24
Wheelchair basketball	EuroCup 1	Winners	2024
Women's basketball	FIBA Europe SuperCup Women	Winners	2024
Men's basketball	EuroLeague	Winners	2024–25
Women's basketball	EuroLeague Women	Winners	2025–26
Wheelchair basketball	EuroCup 1	Winners	2026
Women's basketball	FIBA Europe SuperCup Women	Winners	2026

== Active departments ==
=== Men's football ===
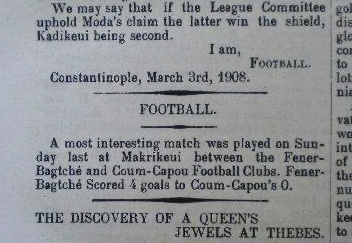
Newspaper article about a match played by Fenerbahçe in the regional tournament on 1 March 1908

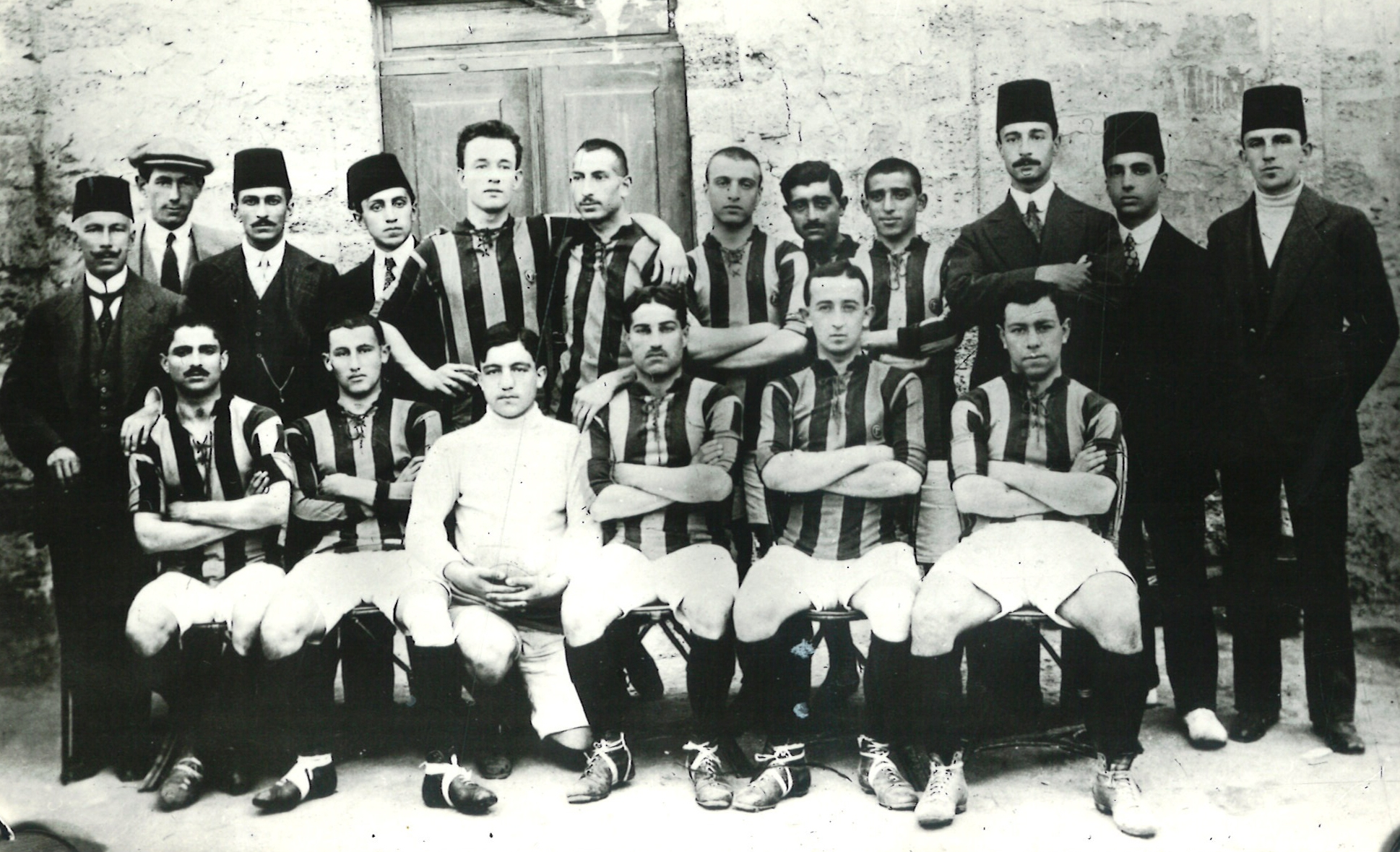
First international appearance of the team. Odessa, 3 June 1914.

The club were founded as a football club in 1907, hence the men's football department are the first and oldest of the club. They have won a record 28 Turkish championship titles over the course of their history, including 19 Super League titles, six National Division titles, and three former Turkish Football Championship titles. Fenerbahçe also won the Balkans Cup in 1968, the first ever international trophy won by a Turkish football club.

Turkish football championships: 28 titles (record)

- Süper Lig (since 1959)

Winners (19): 1959, 1960–61, 1963–64, 1964–65, 1967–68, 1969–70, 1973–74, 1974–75, 1977–78, 1982–83, 1984–85, 1988–89, 1995–96, 2000–01, 2003–04, 2004–05, 2006–07, 2010–11, 2013–14
Runners-up (25): 1959–60, 1961–62, 1966–67, 1970–71, 1972–73, 1975–76, 1976–77, 1979–80, 1983–84, 1989–90, 1991–92, 1993–94, 1997–98, 2001–02, 2005–06, 2007–08, 2009–10, 2011–12, 2012–13, 2014–15, 2015–16, 2017–18, 2021–22, 2022–23, 2023–24

- Turkish National Division (1937–1950)

Winners (6) (record): 1937, 1940, 1943, 1945, 1946, 1950
Runners-up (2): 1944, 1947

- Turkish Football Championship (1924–1951)

Winners (3) (shared-record): 1933, 1935, 1944
Runners-up (2): 1940, 1947

National cups (27)

- Turkish Cup

Winners (7): 1967–68, 1973–74, 1978–79, 1982–83, 2011–12, 2012–13, 2022–23
Runners-up (11): 1962–63, 1964–65, 1988–89, 1995–96, 2000–01, 2004–05, 2005–06, 2008–09, 2009–10, 2015–16, 2017–18

- Turkish Super Cup

Winners (10): 1968, 1973, 1975, 1984, 1985, 1990, 2007, 2009, 2014, 2025
Runners-up (10): 1970, 1974, 1978, 1979, 1983, 1989, 1996, 2012, 2013, 2023

- Prime Minister's Cup

Winners (8) (record): 1945, 1946, 1950, 1973, 1980, 1989, 1993, 1998
Runners-up (7): 1944, 1971, 1976, 1977, 1992, 1994, 1995

- Atatürk Cup

Winners (1) (shared-record): 1998

- Spor Toto Cup

Winners (1): 1967

Regional competitions:

- Istanbul Football League

Winners (16) (record): 1911–12, 1913–14, 1914–15, 1920–21, 1922–23, 1929–30, 1932–33, 1934–35, 1935–36, 1936–37, 1943–44, 1946–47, 1947–48, 1952–53, 1956–57, 1958–59
Runners-up (18): 1915–16, 1917–18, 1921–22, 1925–26, 1926–27, 1928–29, 1930–31, 1933–34, 1937–38, 1938–39, 1939–40, 1940–41, 1942–43, 1944–45, 1945–46, 1949–50, 1955–56, 1957–58

- Istanbul Football Cup

Winners (1): 1944–45
Runners-up (2): 1941–42, 1943–44

- Istanbul Shield

Winners (4) (record): 1929–30, 1933–34, 1937–38, 1938–39
Runners-up (1): 1932–33

International competitions:

- Balkans Cup

Winners (1): 1966–67

=== Women's football ===
Originally founded in 1995 and re-founded in 2021, the women's football department of Fenerbahçe competes in the Turkish Women's Football Super League.

National championships (1)

- Women's Super League

Winners (1): 2025–26

=== Men's basketball ===
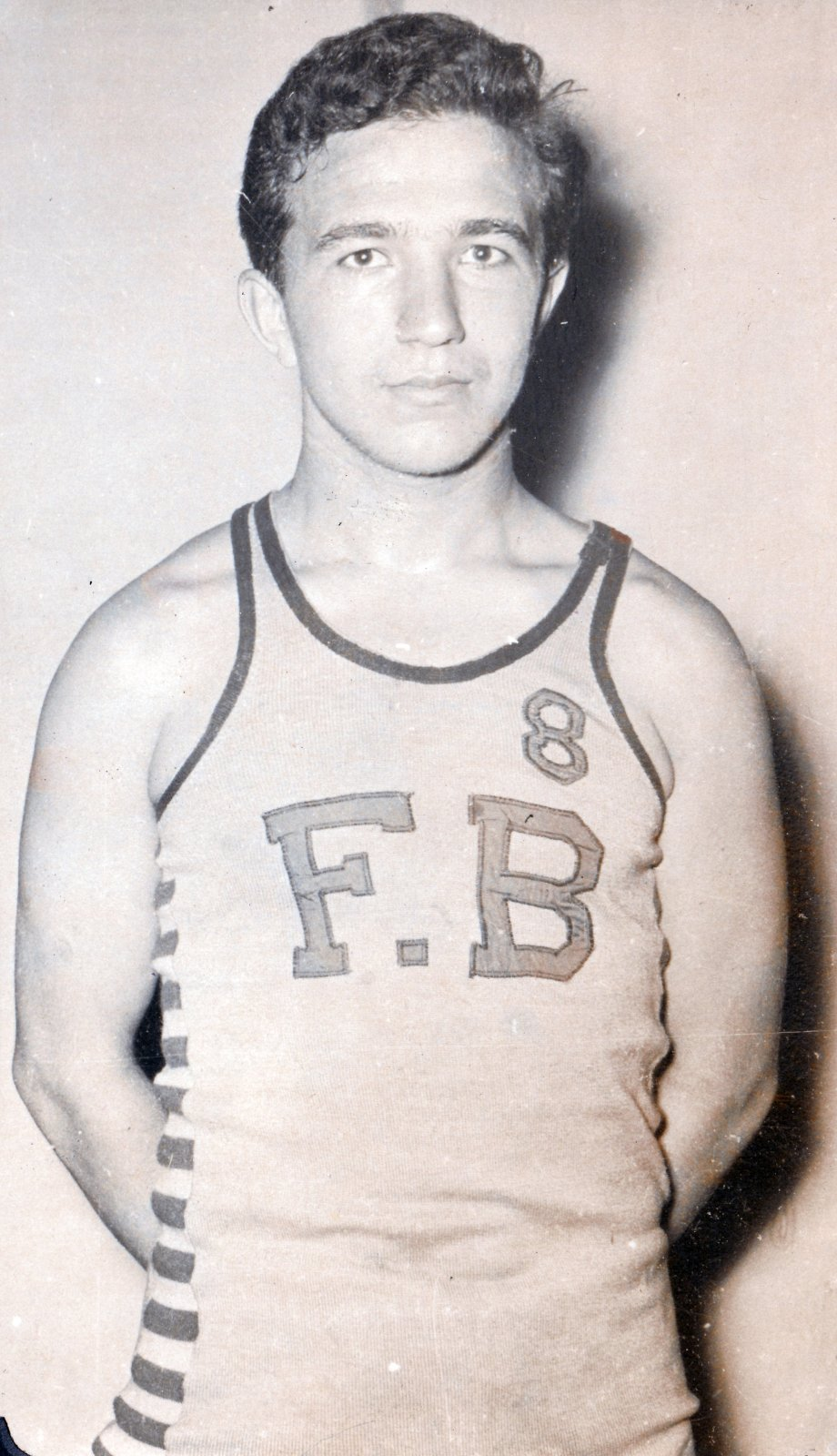
Mehmet Baturalp, one of the key players of the first basketball championship in team's history in the 1954–55 season.

Initially founded in 1913, the men's basketball department could not persist due to the Balkan Wars and WWI. Eventually, under the initiative of Muhtar Sencer and Cem Atabeyoğlu, they were founded in their current permanent form in 1944. Fenerbahçe are one of the most successful clubs in Turkish basketball history, having won the EuroLeague as the first Turkish team, as well as 15 championship titles (12 in the Basketball Super League and 3 in the former Turkish Basketball Championship), 10 Turkish Cups, and 8 Turkish Super Cups, among others. They have also played in five consecutive EuroLeague Final Fours (2015, 2016, 2017, 2018, and 2019) and seven in total so far, a record in Turkish basketball. On 5 October 2012, Fenerbahçe became the first and only Turkish basketball club to win against an NBA team. As of 2025, Fenerbahçe is considered to be one of the two top teams of the Turkish Super League and 5th in European rankings. In the 2024–25 season, Fener managed to achieve a historic Triple Crown, becoming the first and only Turkish team to achieve this feat.

European competitions:

- EuroLeague

Winners (2): 2016–17, 2024–25
Runners-up (2): 2015–16, 2017–18

National competitions:

- Turkish League

Winners (15): 1957, 1959, 1965, 1990–91, 2006–07, 2007–08, 2009–10, 2010–11, 2013–14, 2015–16, 2016–17, 2017–18, 2021–22, 2023–24, 2024–25
Runners-up (16): 1954, 1956, 1958, 1963, 1964, 1967, 1967–68, 1969–70, 1970–71, 1982–83, 1984–85, 1992–93, 1994–95, 2008–09, 2018–19, 2020–21

- Turkish Cup

Winners (10): 1966–67, 2009–10, 2010–11, 2012–13, 2016, 2019, 2020, 2024, 2025, 2026
Runners-up (5): 1993–94, 1996–97, 1998–99, 2014–15, 2022

- Turkish Presidential Cup

Winners (8): 1990, 1991, 1994, 2007, 2013, 2016, 2017, 2025
Runners-up (11): 1985, 1988, 2008, 2009, 2010, 2011, 2014, 2018, 2019, 2022, 2024

- Turkish Federation Cup (defunct)

Winners (5): 1954, 1958, 1959, 1960, 1961
Runners-up (2): 1948, 1951

Regional competitions:

- Istanbul Basketball League (defunct)

Winners (7): 1954–55, 1955–56, 1956–57, 1962–63, 1963–64, 1964–65, 1965–66
Runners-up (3): 1950–51, 1953–54, 1957–58

=== Women's basketball ===
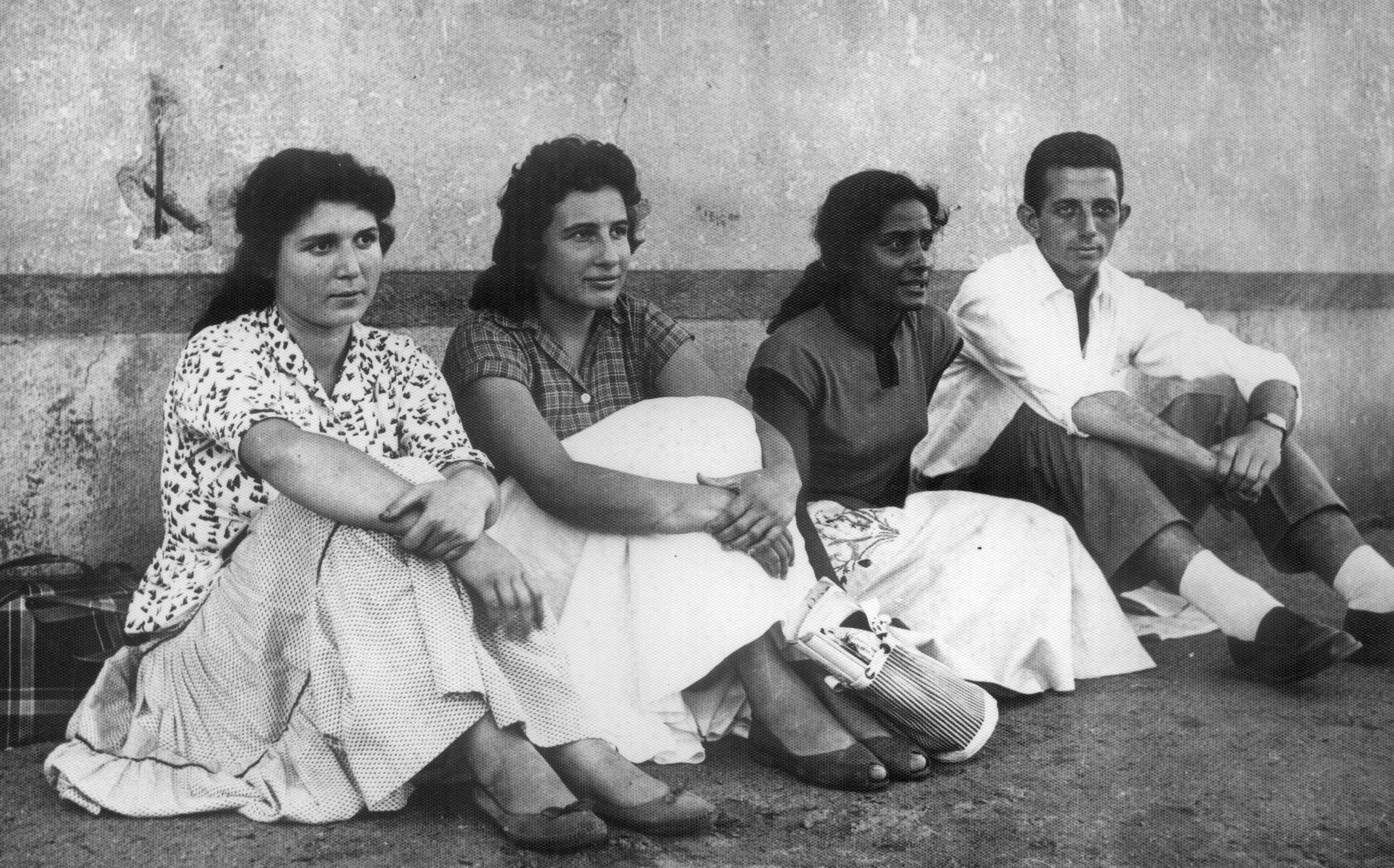
Fenerbahçe women's basketball team founders Ayten Salih and İnci Önen with their teammates Süheda Özçiçekçi and their first coach Altan Dinçer

In 1954, Fenerbahçe founded the first women's basketball team in Turkey. They became the most successful in Turkey, and achieved considerable success in European competitions. They became EuroLeague runners-up on three occasions, in the 2012–13, 2013–14, and 2016–17 seasons, and reached the third place twice in 2016 and 2021. The club also became fourth in the 2011–12 and 2014–15 seasons. Furthermore, Fenerbahçe became runners-up in the EuroCup in 2005. Overall, Fener played in four major European finals and managed to be among the best four European clubs seven times. In 2023, Fenerbahçe finally won the EuroLeague by defeating ÇBK Mersin Yenişehir 99–60 in the all-Turkish final. By achieving this feat, Fener became the first sports club in history to be crowned European champions in both men's and women's basketball. Eventually in the same year, Fenerbahçe became the first and only Turkish club to date to win the FIBA Europe SuperCup by crushing France's LDLC ASVEL Féminin on their own homeground with a dominating victory and a point differential of 57, a record in the SuperCup's history. in 2024 Fenerbahçe successfully defended their crown by defeating first-time finalists Villeneuve d'Ascq LM to become back-to-back champions in EuroLeague.

Domestically, Fenerbahçe won 23 Turkish championship titles (3 in the former Turkish Women's Basketball Championship and 20 in the Turkish Super League), 15 Turkish Cups, and 14 Turkish Super Cups, all of them records.

The team has scored a perfect season in 2023–24 Women's Basketball Super League by winning all 35 season games. The team also won all the championships that they compete in 23-24 season; Turkish Women's Basketball Cup, FIBA Europe SuperCup Women and EuroLeague Women.

European competitions (4)

- European Championship

Winners (3) (Turkish record): 2022–23, 2023–24, 2025–26

- European Super Cup

Winners (2) (Turkish record): 2023, 2024

National championships (23) (record)

- Women's Basketball Super League

Winners (20) (record): 1998–99, 2001–02, 2003–04, 2005–06, 2006–07, 2007–08, 2008–09, 2009–10, 2010–11, 2011–12, 2012–13, 2015–16, 2017–18, 2018–19, 2020–21, 2021–22, 2022–23, 2023–24, 2024–25, 2025–26

- Turkish Basketball Championship (defunct)

Winners (3): 1956, 1957, 1958

National cups (29) (record)

- Turkish Cup

Winners (15) (record): 1998–99, 1999–2000, 2000–01, 2003–04, 2004–05, 2005–06, 2006–07, 2007–08, 2008–09, 2014–15, 2015–16, 2019, 2020, 2024, 2026

- Turkish Super Cup

Winners (14) (record): 1999, 2000, 2001, 2004, 2005, 2007, 2010, 2012, 2013, 2014, 2015, 2019, 2024, 2025

=== Wheelchair basketball (mixed gender) ===
The team became champion in the Wheelchair Basketball Super League under the name of 'Engelli Yıldızlar SK' in the 1998–99 and 1999-2000 seasons, and in the 2018-19 season under the name of '1907 Fenerbahçe Engelli Yıldızlar SK'. In Europe the team came second in the Andre Vergauwen Cup in 2006-2007 and the Willi Brinkmann Cup in 2005-2006, and became the champion in EuroLeague 3 in the 2018-19 season under the name of 1907 Fenerbahce Disabled Stars SK. In the 2022-2023 season, Fenerbahçe Göksel Çelik Wheelchair Basketball team became the champion in EuroCup II. The team also beat the Bidaideak Bilbao BSR and became the 2024 EuroCup 1 champions in 2023-24 season.

National championships (7)

- Turkish Wheelchair Basketball Super League

Winners (7): 1998–99, 1999–00, 2018–19, 2021–22, 2022–23, 2023-24, 2025-26

European competitions (3)

- EuroCup 1, EuroCup 2, EuroCup 3

Winners (3): 2018–2019, 2022–2023, 2023–2024

=== Men's volleyball ===
Founded in 1927, they are one of the most successful volleyball teams in Turkey, having won five Turkish Volleyball League titles, five Turkish Cups and four Turkish Super Cups, among others. In Europe, Fenerbahçe have won two Balkan Cups and the CEV Challenge Cup in the 2013–14 season.

European competitions (3)

- European Cup

Winners (1) (shared Turkish record): 2013–14

- Balkan Cup

Winners (2) (shared-record): 2009, 2013

National championships (5)

- Turkish Men's Volleyball League

Winners (5): 2007–08, 2009–10, 2010–11, 2011–12, 2018–19

National cups (11)

- Turkish Cup

Winners (5): 2007–08, 2011–12, 2016–17, 2018–19, 2024–25

- Turkish Super Cup

Winners (4): 2011, 2012, 2017, 2020

- Turkish Federation Cup (defunct)

Winners (2): 1962, 1966

=== Women's volleyball ===
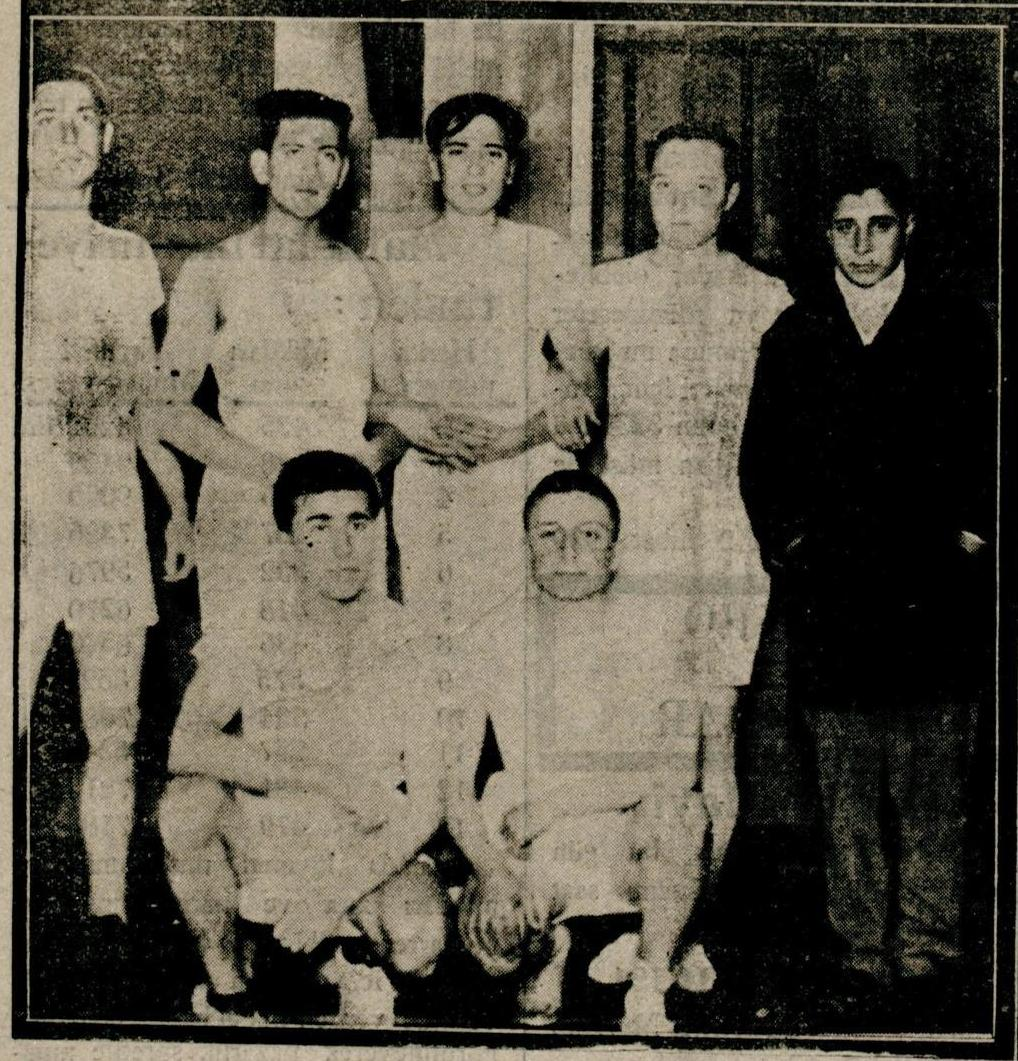
Sabiha Rıfat Gürayman with her male teammates from Fenerbahçe's volleyball team in 1929

Founded in 1928 by Sabiha Gürayman who also became captain of the team, the women's volleyball department of Fenerbahçe was the first in Turkey and was closed the same year due to a lack of opponents. As a young woman, Sabiha Gürayman also played for the club's men's volleyball team, being the first female athlete to play in a men's team in Turkish sports history. Refounded in their current form in 1954, they became one of the best volleyball teams in Turkey and in the world. They were crowned World Champions by winning the FIVB Volleyball Women's Club World Championship undefeated in 2010, thus achieving the first Intercontinental Quadruple ever in Turkish volleyball history, after having won the Turkish League, Turkish Cup, and the Turkish Super Cup in 2010. Fenerbahçe became the first Turkish team to claim a World Championship title. After being runners-up in the European Champions League in 2010, Fenerbahçe were eventually crowned European Champions in the 2011–12 season after defeating French powerhouse RC Cannes in three straight sets (25–14, 25–22, and 25–20) in the final game. The club also reached the third place of the Champions League twice, in the 2010–11 and 2015–16 seasons.

Fenerbahçe also won the CEV Cup by defeating Russia's Uralochka-NTMK Ekaterinburg 3–0 (25-11, 28–26, 25-22) in the 2014 finals in front of their home crowd, thus making volleyball history as the men's team won another continental title and the CEV Challenge Cup the very same day. By achieving this unparalleled feat, Fenerbahçe became the first and only sports club in Turkey and one of a few in Europe with European titles won in both the men's and women's volleyball departments.

Domestically, Fenerbahçe won 15 championship titles (seven in the Turkish Women's Volleyball League and eight in the former Turkish Women's Volleyball Championship), four Turkish Cups and four Turkish Super Cups, among others.

International competitions (1)

- World Championship

Winners (1): 2010

European competitions (2)

- European Championship

Winners (1): 2011–12

- European Cup

Winners (1): 2013–14

National championships (15)

- Turkish Women's Volleyball League

Winners (7): 2008–09, 2009–10, 2010–11, 2014–15, 2016–17, 2022–23, 2023–24

- Turkish Women's Volleyball Championship (defunct)

Winners (8): 1956, 1957, 1958, 1959, 1960, 1968, 1969, 1972

National cups (11)

- Turkish Cup

Winners (4): 2009–10, 2014–15, 2016–17, 2023–24

- Turkish Super Cup

Winners (5) (shared-record): 2009, 2010, 2015, 2022, 2024

- Turkish Federation Cup (defunct)

Winners (2): 1960, 1977

=== Men's table tennis ===
Founded in 1928, the table tennis department of Fenerbahçe became the most successful in Turkey. The men's team won the Turkish Super League five times, the Turkish Cup a record 11 times and the Istanbul Championship a record 23 times. They also reached the final of the ETTU Cup in 2008, which is the best result for any Turkish team so far.

- Turkish Super League

Winners (6) (record): 2006–07, 2007–08, 2008–09, 2015–16, 2018–19, 2020-21

- Turkish Cup

Winners (12): 1951, 1966, 1968, 1970, 1972, 1979, 1983, 2006, 2007, 2009, 2012, 2015

=== Women's table tennis ===
The women's team is the most successful in Turkey and one of the most successful in Europe, having won the Turkish Championship a record 13 times, the Turkish Cup a record 14 times, the ETTU Cup two times in a row in 2012 and 2013, and the European Champions League as the first and only Turkish club in the 2014–15 season.

- European Championship

Winners (1) (Turkish record): 2014–15

- European Cup

Winners (2) (Turkish record): 2011–12, 2012–13

- Turkish Super League

Winners (16) (record): 1998–99, 1999–00, 2000–01, 2001–02, 2007–08, 2009–10, 2010–11, 2011–12, 2012–13, 2013–14, 2014–15, 2015–16, 2018–19, 2020–21, 2021–22, 2022–23

- Turkish Cup

Winners (16) (record): 1968, 1999, 2000, 2001, 2007, 2008, 2009, 2010, 2011, 2012, 2013, 2014, 2015, 2019, 2022, 2023

- Istanbul Championship/League (defunct)

Winners (11): 1964, 1965, 1966, 1967, 1968, 1970, 1976, 1999, 2000, 2001, 2002

=== Athletics (men's & women's) ===
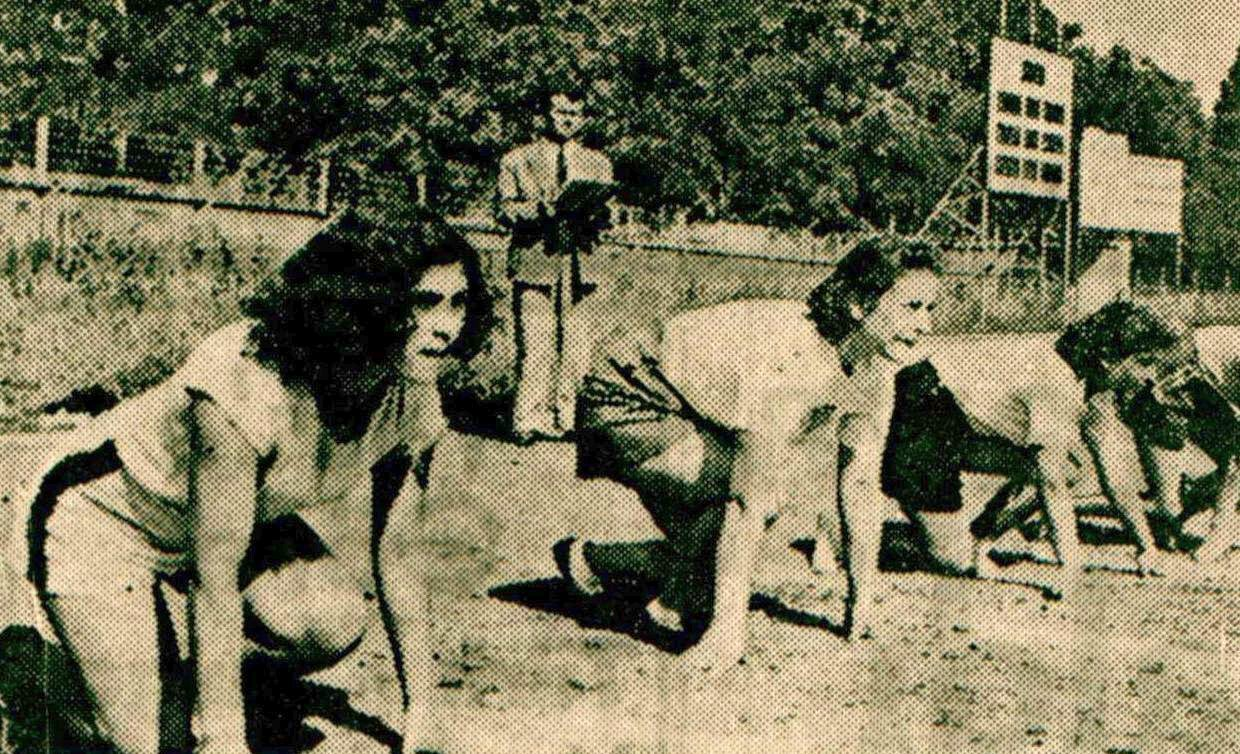
Women's athletics in 1941

The department was founded in 1913 and is one of the most successful in Turkey, with the men's team having won a record 20 championships in the Turkish Men's Athletics League, amongst others. The women's team won 8 championships in the Women's Athletics League and became runners-up in the European Champion Clubs Cup in 2015.

Fenerbahçe athletes won many medals representing Turkey, such as in Olympics; Ruhi Sarıalp (1948-bronze), Eşref Apak (2004-silver) and Yasmani Copello Escobar (2016-bronze), Nevin Cevap (2010 and 2012) and Ramil Guliyev (2018) became European champions, Ruhi Sarıalp (1950) and Halil Akkaş (2011) became European third. While Ramil Guliyev became World champion in 2017 and Karin Melis Mey came third in the World in 2009, Ekrem Koçak, Osman Coşgül, Mustafa Batman and Muharrem Dalkılıç won the Inter-Army World championships.

=== Boxing (men's & women's) ===
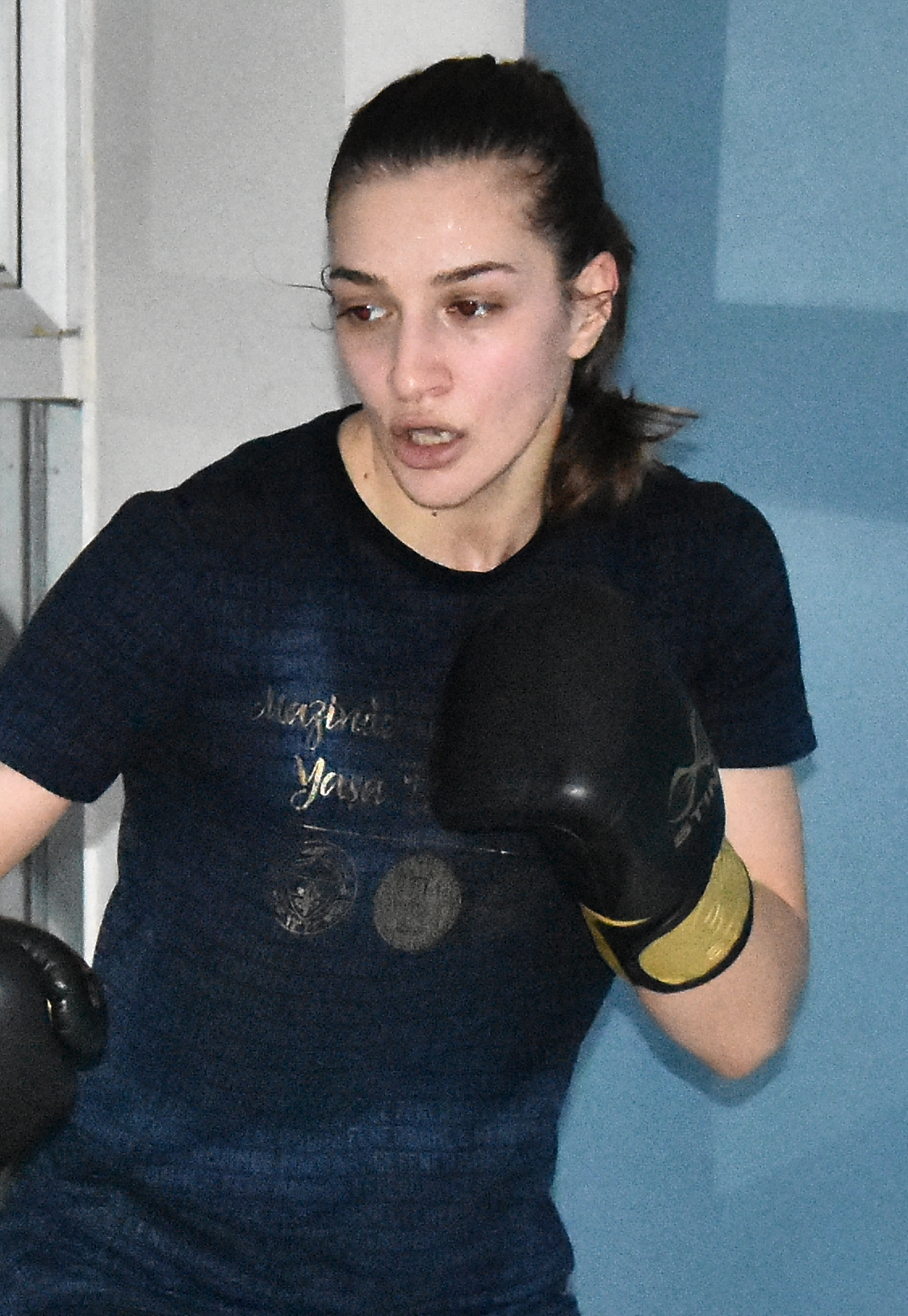
Buse Naz Çakıroğlu, two times Olympic and World and four times European finalist

Founded in 1914, they are one of the boxing departments in Turkey. Overall, Fenerbahçe Boxing has nurtured some of the greatest boxers in Turkish boxing history, with numerous Mediterranean, European, Olympic, and Worldwide honours won for Turkish sports and the club itself.

The club's athletes have won nine gold, four silver, and nine bronze medals in world championships, whilst winning five silver and two bronze medals at the Olympics, and securing nine gold, one silver and nine bronze medals in European championships. Athletes have also won seven gold medals in Mediterranean games and eight gold medals in Balkan games.

=== Rowing (men's & women's) ===
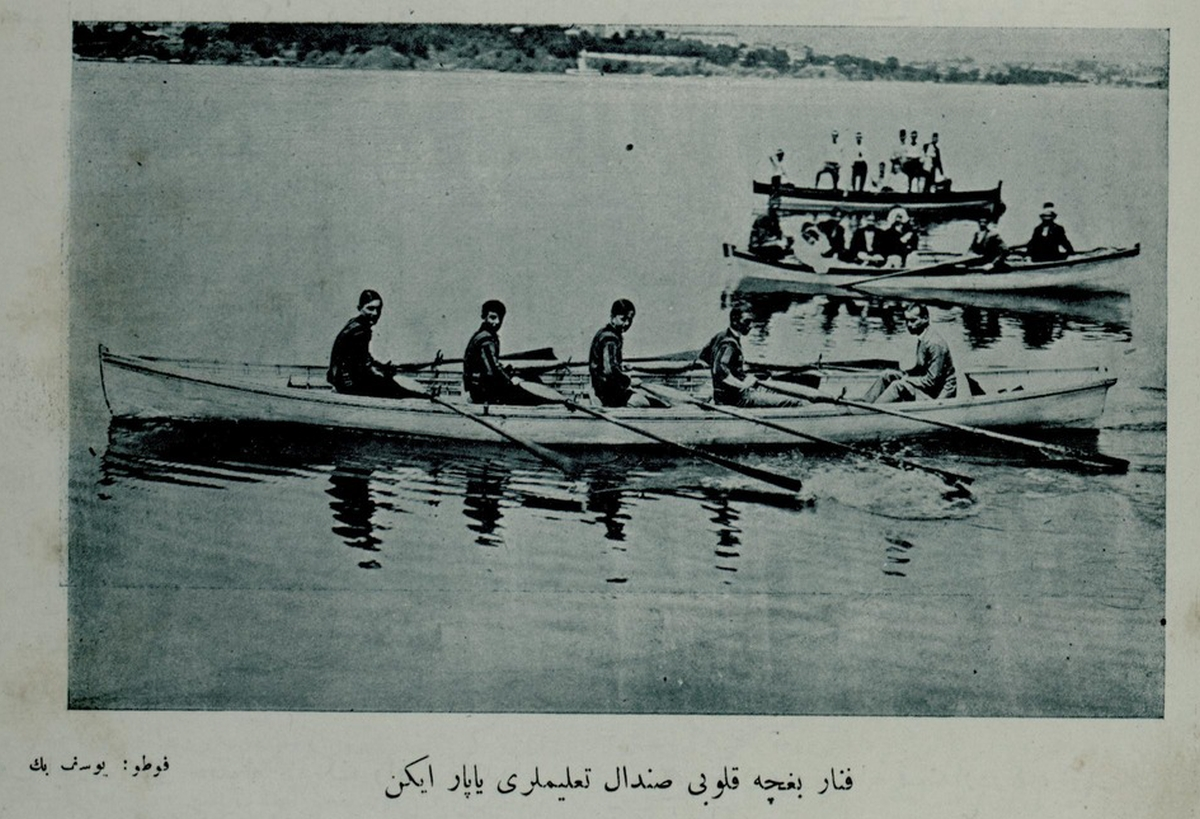
Men's rowing team in 1913

Founded in 1910. Fenerbahçe Rowers use the Dereağzı Facilities as homeground. Founded in 1914, both the men's and women's rowing teams are the most successful in Turkey, having won the Turkish Men's Rowing Championship a record 35 times and the Women's Rowing Championship a record 18 times, amongst others. Fenerbahçe has been the club that has provided the most athletes to the national team since Tonguç Türsan, who achieved Turkey's first official success in the international arena by winning the silver medal in single sculls at the 1955 Mediterranean Games.

=== Sailing (men's & women's) ===
Founded in 1910, the department consists of optimist, laser, 420, 470 and windsurf teams and uses the Dereağzı Facilities, belonging to the club.

=== Swimming (men's & women's) ===
Founded in 1913, the swimming department of Fenerbahçe is the most successful in Turkey, with the men's team having won 23 national championships and the women's team a record 33 national championships altogether. In the combined category, they have won a total of 23 national championships, which is also a Turkish record.

=== Fenerbahçe Esports (mixed gender) ===
Founded in 2016, the team has three championships and two runners-up in the League of Legends Championship League.

=== Semi-professional branches ===
==== Gymnastics ====
Gymnastics activities began when former president Hamit Hüsnü Kayacan purchased a chin-up bar and parallel bars and set them up next to the club in 1914. The activities were led by İlhami Polater, air pilot (later Lieutenant General) Asım Uçar, General Nuri Bey and Colonel Kadri Bey, and the activities were increased by the fact that famous physical education experts of the period Faik Üstünidman and Mazhar Kazancıoğlu occasionally gave lessons to young Fenerbahçe fans. However, this sport was neglected after 1924 and became disbanded in 1930. It was later reactivated under 'Fenerbahçe Spor Okulları' (Fenerbahçe Sports Schools).

==== Chess ====
Although not being directly a branch of the club, several Fenerbahçe affiliated organizations competed in national championships in 2023 and 2024. The club also has a semi-professional presence under 'Fenerbahçe Spor Okulları' (Fenerbahçe Sports Schools).

== Inactive departments ==
=== Bicycle and triathlon ===
In cycling, which has been active since 1912, Fenerbahçe athletes won their first period championships, while Vecdi Çağatay, who came first in the 1912 and 1913 Fenerbahçe Sports Festivals and the 1914 Friday Union Festivals, stood out as the first champion. The first Turkish cyclists to participate in the 1924 and 1928 Summer Olympics were the brothers Cavit Cav and Galip Cav. In 1924, Cavit Cav became both the speed and endurance champion in the Turkish Cycling Championships, which were first held in Ankara. He maintained this success until 1932. Galip and Cavit Cav brothers became the first Turkish athletes to complete the long-distance race by completing the İzmir-Bandırma leg in 50.5 hours, starting on July 10, 1926. Tayyar Güner, who completed the 3,500-kilometer Anatolian tour starting from Istanbul in 1956 and Sadık Yalım, who helped Fenerbahçe win the Istanbul championship in 1959, were the last notable cyclists to achieve success in the yellow-navy blue jersey. The activity in the triathlon branch in the early 1990s, although there were some isolated successes, was not long-lasting.

=== Cricket ===
At the beginning of the century, Fenerbahçe was the only Turkish club to show interest in cricket activities in Beykoz and Moda and a team was established in the yellow-navy club in 1911. The team, consisting of a complete team of athletes such as Sait Selahattin Cihanoğlu, Galip Kulaksızoğlu, Tevfik Taşçı, Fahri Ayad, competed against English teams between 1911 and 1914. With the end of World War I and the British leaving Turkey, it was left without a rival and disbanded.

=== Tennis ===
The tennis team, founded in 1914 with the efforts of former president Sabri Toprak, won its first İstanbul, Turkey and Challenge Cup championships in 1922, also defeating the British. In 1923, it became the team that brought the first female tennis players of Turkey to the courts. 3 The national team, consisting of Fenerbahçe tennis players Suat Subay, Sedat Erkoğlu and Vahram Şirinyan, became champions in the 1930 Balkan Championship in Athens by defeating their Greek, Bulgarian and Romanian opponents, and in 1931 they won third place in Istanbul. The Turkish and Challenge Cup championships, which were held by Fenerbahçe tennis players in the men's singles and doubles until 1937, were passed on to the Tennis, Fencing and Mountaineering Sports Club, which was founded in 1936, due to the club's financial difficulties restricting its activities to football, athletics and rowing. The tennis branch, which gained momentum with the reopening of the Fernerbahçe courts to sports in 1942, performed its last important activity in 1949 with matches against the visiting Cercle de la Jeunesse team from Syria; although it was invited to Lebanon in 1950, it became history in the 1950s.

=== Wrestling ===
In wrestling, which was taken into operation in 1914, Seyfi Cenap Berksoy and Dürrü Sade (who also served as presidents of the Wrestling Federation) represented Turkey as athletes in the 1924 Summer Olympics and İlhami Polater (1922), the first Greco-Roman style champion in Turkey, became the most important Fenerbahçe athletes of the classical period. Fenerbahçe wrestling team, which was reactivated in 1959 under the supervision of coach Mustafa Çakmak. The team won its first Istanbul championship in Greco-Roman in 1961. The captain of the Fenerbahçe Greco-Roman team, which was the Istanbul champion for three years in a row between 1966 and 1968, Sırrı Acar won the European championship in 1967 and 1968, and the World championship in 1967. Fenerbahçe wrestling team, which was re-established in 1981 and continued its activities until 1987, reached the second places in Istanbul and Turkey.

=== Field hockey ===
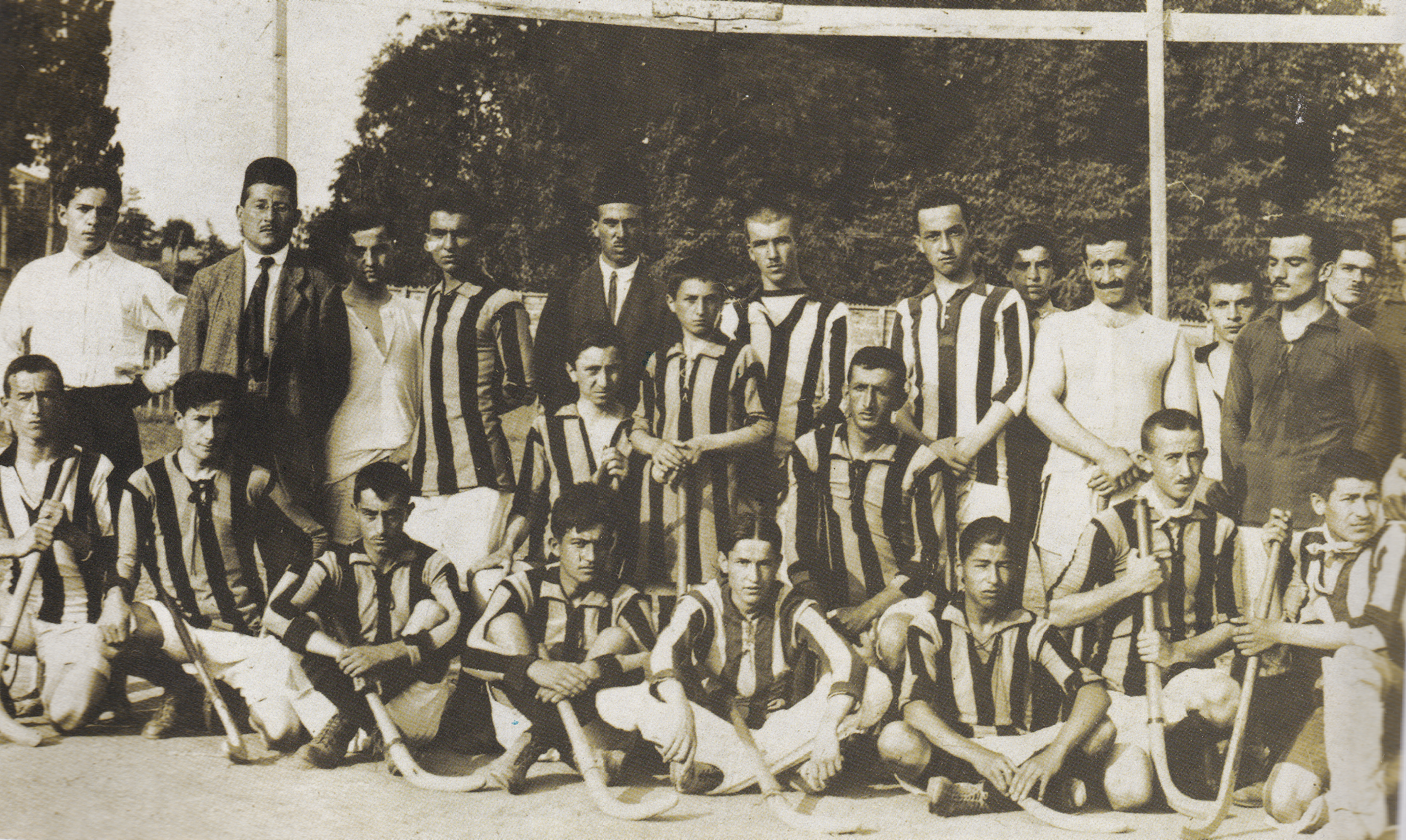
Field hockey team in 1915

The team, which was formed in 1914 with the efforts of the founding director Mustafa Elkatipzade, came first in the Istanbul Championship organized by the Hockey Association, which was founded by six Istanbul teams in 1915. In 1923, the Turkish Sports Association Alliance also took up this sport, and Fenerbahçe became the club with the most first-place finishes, winning four championships in the eight Istanbul Leagues organized between 1915 and 1926. The match in which the yellow-navy team won 3-1 against the English on April 14, 1926 was the last match of the Fenerbahçe field hockey team due to lack of competition and was the last competition seen in this sport in Turkey until the 2000s.

=== Skating and roller hockey ===
Former presidents first practiced it in a 16x30 meter concrete skating rink built next to the club's premises, which was moved to Kuşdili in 1914, and these activities formed the basis for the establishment of the roller hockey team in 1923. In the 1923-24 season, Fenerbahçe, which was included in the Istanbul 2nd League in which Galatasaray, Vefa and Nişantaşı clubs competed, beat Nişantaşı 6-4 and then beat Vefa 20-3 on March 7, 1924, establishing the current points record in this sport. Galatasaray's withdrawal and the league remaining unfinished, which was accepted as a demonstration sport at the 1992 Summer Olympics, caused this sport to become history in Turkey in 1924, and forced Fenerbahçe, which had focused on this sport by establishing two young teams, to end its activities.

=== Scouting ===
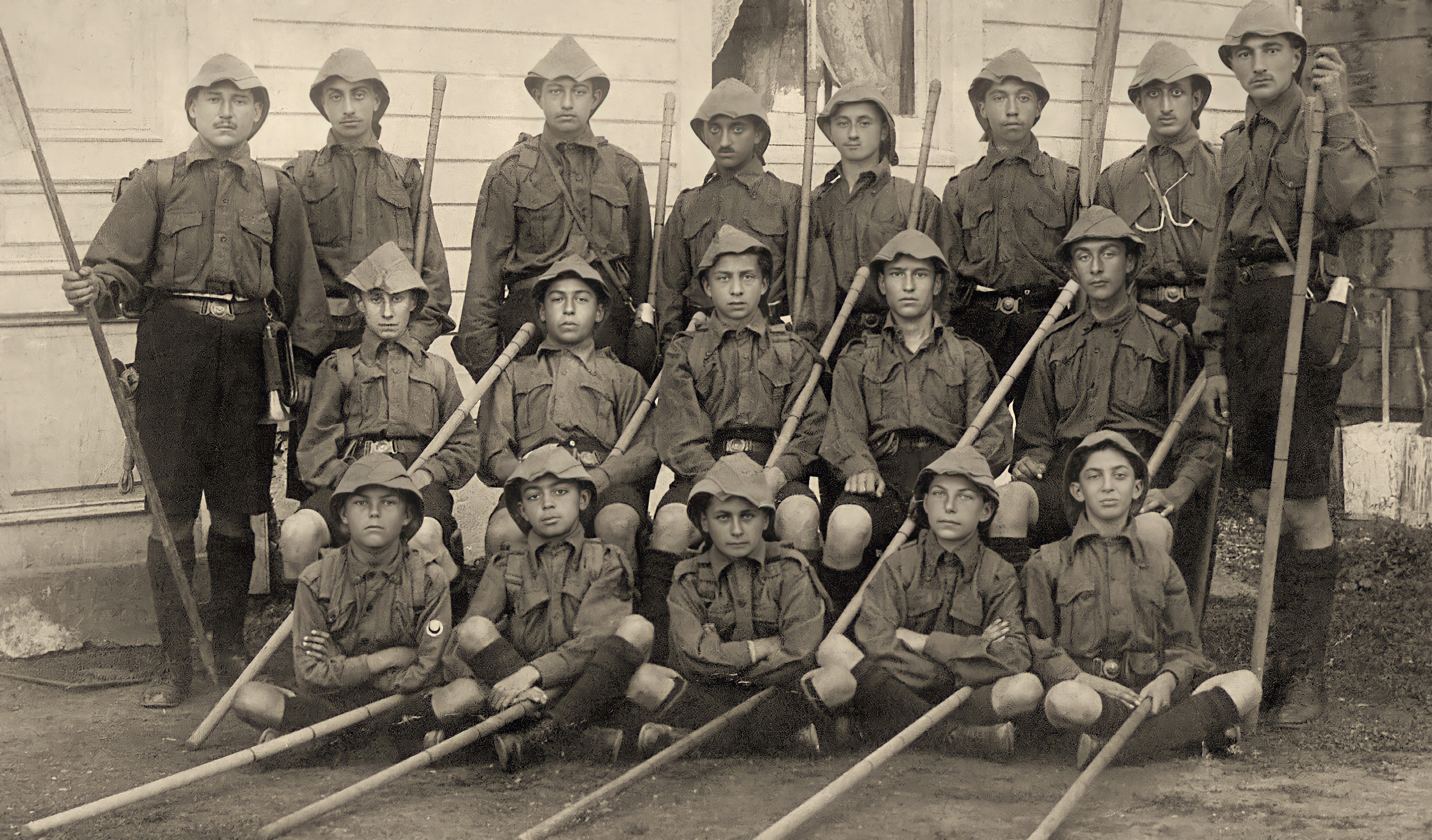
Men's scouts in 1914

Fenerbahçe turned to this field in 1915 upon the application of the Minister of War Enver Pasha, who wanted to revive the scouting activities that started under the leadership of the Ottoman Scouts Society, which was founded in 1912, and after the Balkan War, Fenerbahçe established its first scouting team under the leadership of Mustafa Elkatipzade with the equipment sent by the government. As a result of the defeats in the Balkan and Tripoli Wars, the government of the period focused on the Scouting Club system, which was aimed at accustoming Muslim, Turkish youth to war conditions and mobilizations. In accordance with this understanding, Fenerbahçe Club first established the Keşşaflık Ocağı team in 1913 to train scouts consisting of youth players in all branches of sports. During the National Struggle years, the branch, which was content with camping and travel activities due to the seizure of equipment by the occupying forces, was reorganized in 1923 with the efforts of football player Alaattin Baydar. The activities that were performed in Bursa and Istanbul, which had just been liberated from enemy occupation, and were appreciated at the highest level, were eliminated in 1932 when the scouting equipment was completely reduced to ashes in the fire of Fenerbahçe Museum.

=== Fencing ===
Air pilot Asım Uçar and Sait Bey epee, Sedat and Feyzi Beys distinguished themselves in the foil branch of this Olympic sport, which was taken into operation in 1917. The yellow-navy team, coached by Colonel Grodetski, one of the White Russians who fled the 1917 Revolution and settled in Istanbul, performed at the Himaye-i Etfal Festival on June 20, 1920 and at the Fenerbahçe Festival in 1921 Although they had successful competitions, they lost their vitality when Asım Uçar left Istanbul to join the National Struggle.

=== Fikir ve Sahne ===
Fenerbahçe's 1918 bylaws state that "The club is divided into Sports and Intellectual Training Branches. The idea and stage branch, founded in the spring of 1919 by the then president (also a playwright and former wrestler) Refik Ahmet Nuri Sekizinci in accordance with the 4th article of the ruling that "Each branch has separate statutes", carried out efforts to raise awareness among the public and members during the National Struggle years through conferences, theater plays and concerts led by Muhittin Sadak and Münir Nurettin Selçuk, and the Fenerbahçe magazine was published every 15 days. The branch was forced to end its activities on March 16, 1920, when the Occupation Army Command declared a ban on meetings after the occupation of Istanbul.

=== Baseball ===
The activities of the team, which was formed in July 1919 under the supervision of an American coach and consisting of leading Fenerbahçe football players of the period, primarily Galip Kulaksızoğlu, Zeki Rıza Sporel, İsmet Uluğ, Alaattin Baydar and Sabih Arca, were limited to competitions with American teams when other Turkish clubs did not show interest in this sport, and it ended in a short time.

=== Billiards ===
Fenerbahçe and Beşiktaş athletes showed interest in this sport in the early years of the Republic In the Istanbul Championship held in 1924, yellow-navy athlete Major Fuat Bey became the champion with 183 points. A year later, Beşiktaş's Nafi Bey came first with 187 shots and the Prime Minister of the period İsmet İnönü showed great interest in this sport, but over the years it has become an activity specific to coffeehouses, and this has also extinguished the clubs' early interest.

=== Motor sports ===
Automobile races, which started with the establishment of the Turkish Touring and Automobile Association in 1923, Fenerbahçe drivers Ziya Koşar (1927, Veliefendi) and Atatürk watched the races in which Samiye Burhan Cahit Morkaya (1931, İstinye-Maslak) won their first championships. While Morkaya became the first female champion, The Castrol and Turing Club cups were also won by the aforementioned Fenerbahçe racers and the cups were donated to the Fenerbahçe Museum. The successes of the first generation Fenerbahçe racers were also left in history as this sport was neglected from the World War II years to the 1970s.

=== Weightlifting ===
The first championship of the yellow-navy colors in weightlifting, which was launched in 1925, was the Istanbul lightweight championship won by the famous master of description and rower of the 1940s and 50s Kenan Dinçman on October 8, 1926. The weightlifting branch, which was revived after 1957, became the Istanbul champion and second in Turkey in the youth category in 1968, and reached the Istanbul championship in 1969. Fenerbahçe, which won individual championships until 1976, won its last team success with the Istanbul championship on March 19, 1972.

=== Hunting ===
The work that Galip Kulaksızoğlu and Sait Selahattin Cihanoğlu first started in 1913 became more organized with the establishment of the hunting branch in 1925. The activities, which are particularly concentrated in the Kayışdağı Forest, Katırlı and Alemdağ forests in Istanbul, Cihanoğlu's Kenya, Tanzania and South Sudan regions The branch reached its peak with the hunting party in 1925-1926, which included the hunting party of 1925-1926. Cihanoğlu donated the heads of 22 game animals he hunted, including a lion, to the Fenerbahçe Museum. This branch, which experienced its most active period in the 1930s, lost its popularity as the club's activities focused on Olympic sports and became history with Cihanoğlu's death in 1975.

=== Tower and trampoline diving ===
While Fenerbahçe athletes Fahri Ayad and Kemal Bey stand out as pioneers in both the tower and trampoline diving categories, Mısırlı Şefik, Mahir Canbakan and Suat Erler became the first champions, especially after 1925. Fenerbahçe was represented in this sport by Kiryako Şakir in the 1930s, Mustafa Keskin in the 1940s and Muammer Çolpan after 1950, and all three athletes held the Istanbul and Turkish championships for a long time. Having also played for the national team from 1966 to 1971 and winning his last championship in the pole vault at the Turkish Swimming and Diving Championship held in Adana on August 25, 1969 Çolpan also said goodbye to this sport and the diving branch ended at Fenerbahçe.

=== Water polo ===
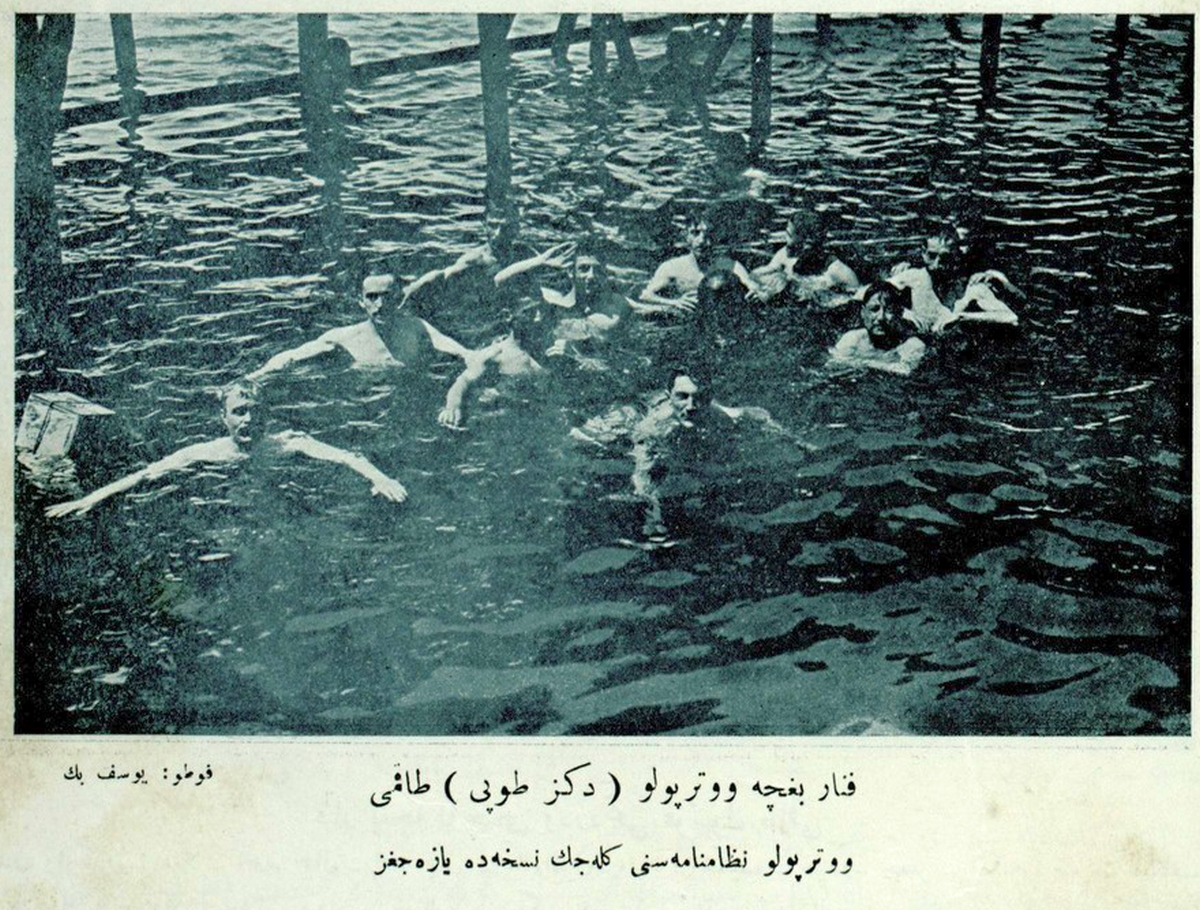
Water polo team in 1913

Although the initial activities of the water polo team captained by Galip Kulaksızoğlu and Said Salahaddin Cihanoğlu on the shores of Moda and Kalamış in 1912 stopped due to lack of competition, activities that were activated with the opening of the Büyükdere pool in 1931 were resumed by Fenerbahçe with the team founded in 1932 under the leadership of Rüştü Dağlaroğlu re-joined. The team, which closed the Vakit Newspaper and Haliç tournaments as champions, finished third in the 1932 İstanbul League and became a rival to Galatasaray in 1933. After a controversial match, Istanbul lost to its opponent 3-2 in overtime and came second. After disbanding in 1936, the teams that were re-established in the 1940s and 1953 were also short-lived.

=== Water skiing ===
This sport, which was first practiced in the US in 1922, was pioneered in Turkey in 1937 by Fenerbahçe's all-around athlete Galip Kulaksızoğlu and sailors Faruk Hızer and Semih Arıcan. On July 25, 1937, on the Maritime Day of Modaspor The cup that Faruk Hızer won and received from Prime Minister İsmet İnönü is one of the most interesting awards exhibited in the Fenerbahçe Museum even in 2024.

=== Handball ===
The handball team, which was formed in 1942 as a result of the joint effort with Haydarpaşa High School, participated in the Istanbul Handball League that started the same year and became the Istanbul champion in the 1943–44 and 1944-45 seasons. The spectator record for handball of the period, which was played in open fields due to insufficient halls, was approximately The record was broken in the match played on April 8, 1945 with 12,000 people before the Fenerbahçe-Galatasaray football match, which Fenerbahçe won 7-4 and secured the championship. The team came second in the first Turkish Handball Championship in 1945, losing 7-5 to Harbokulu in the finals on July 1, 1945. After becoming the champion of Istanbul in 1945-46, it protested the arrangements against it and withdrew from the league as of the 1946-47 season.

=== Rugby ===
Under the leadership of Reşat Ersü, who also played in the national match against France with the Italian national team, and in cooperation with Haydarpaşa High School, a rugby team was formed in Fenerbahçe in 1945 and beat the high school team 8-7 on 12 May 1945 at the Haydarpaşa High School Sports Day. Before the football match in which Fenerbahçe beat Beşiktaş 4-0 at Fenerbahçe Stadium on 18 May 1947, Fenerbahçe's rugby team's 12-0 win over Galatasaray in front of approximately 18,000 spectators caused the red-yellow club to disband the team, and this match went down in history as the last rugby match until the Turkish League was founded in 2007.

=== Archery ===
Archery began operating in Fenerbahçe in 1966 and achieved various successes in the short period until 1971. Fenerbahçe archer Sadık Öğretir, who held Turkish records for a long time, brought Fenerbahçe the Istanbul championship on September 19, 1966 On January 18, 1968, he also came first in the Turkish Archery Championship held in Mersin with 1003 points, which is a Turkish record. Öğretir was also on the national team that participated in the World Archery Championship held in Amersfoort, Netherlands on July 23–29, 1967.

=== Judo ===
Fenerbahçe Club first included judo in its field of study in 1967. Despite the hopeful statements in the Board of Directors report presented to the Fenerbahçe Sports Club Congress held on March 17, 1968, the activities carried out for the youth did not receive the expected attention and this sport was bid farewell in 1971.

=== Bridge ===
A bridge team was established in Fenerbahçe in 1984 with the initiative of former athlete and basketball player Orhan Zeren. The team came third among 44 club and institution teams in the Institutions and Inter-Clubs Turkey Bridge Championship organized by the Turkish Bridge Federation on April 14–15, 1984, behind Seydişehirspor and Turkish Airlines. The team that became the champions of Istanbul in 1986 earned the right to go to the European Champion Clubs' Cup, but since Fenerbahçe Sports Club did not grant the team the right to represent, Ankara champion Ankara Bridge Club participated in the Cup instead of Fenerbahçe. The bridge team, which was re-established in 1999, came third once again among 44 teams in the Turkish Championship held in Burdur on 16–17 October 1999.

=== Shooting ===
Although shooting activities that started in 1986 were successful in a short time, this sport had a short life at Fenerbahçe and activities ended in 1988. The Trap-Skeet Competitions Prime Ministry Cup, Fenerbahçe's greatest success in this sport, is currently exhibited in the Fenerbahçe Museum.

=== Mountaineering ===
A mountaineering team consisting of Tunç Fındık and Mustafa Kalaycı was formed in 2007 as part of the Fenerbahçe World Summits project, which was part of the club's 100th anniversary celebrations during the term of President Yıldırım. Within the scope of the project, the team climbed Mount Ararat, Aconcagua Summit in Argentina, Somoni Summit in Tajikistan, Mont Blanc Summit in France and Kilimanjaro Summit in Tanzania while waving the Turkish and Fenerbahçe flags. They reached the summit of the world's highest mountain Everest on May 21, 2007 and planted the Turkish and Fenerbahçe flags.

== Facilities ==
=== Stadia ===
Grounds of FB

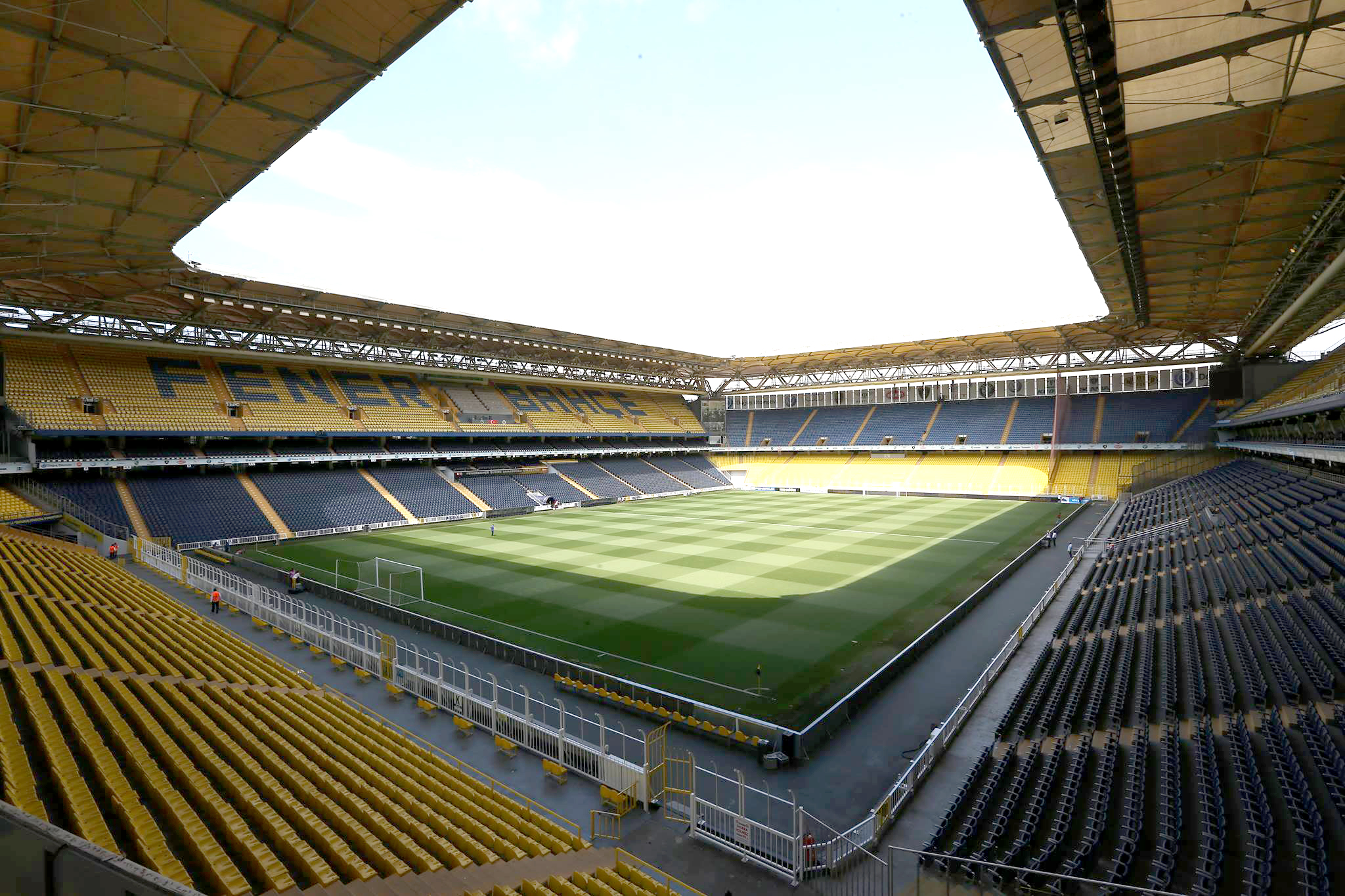
Şükrü Saracoğlu Stadium

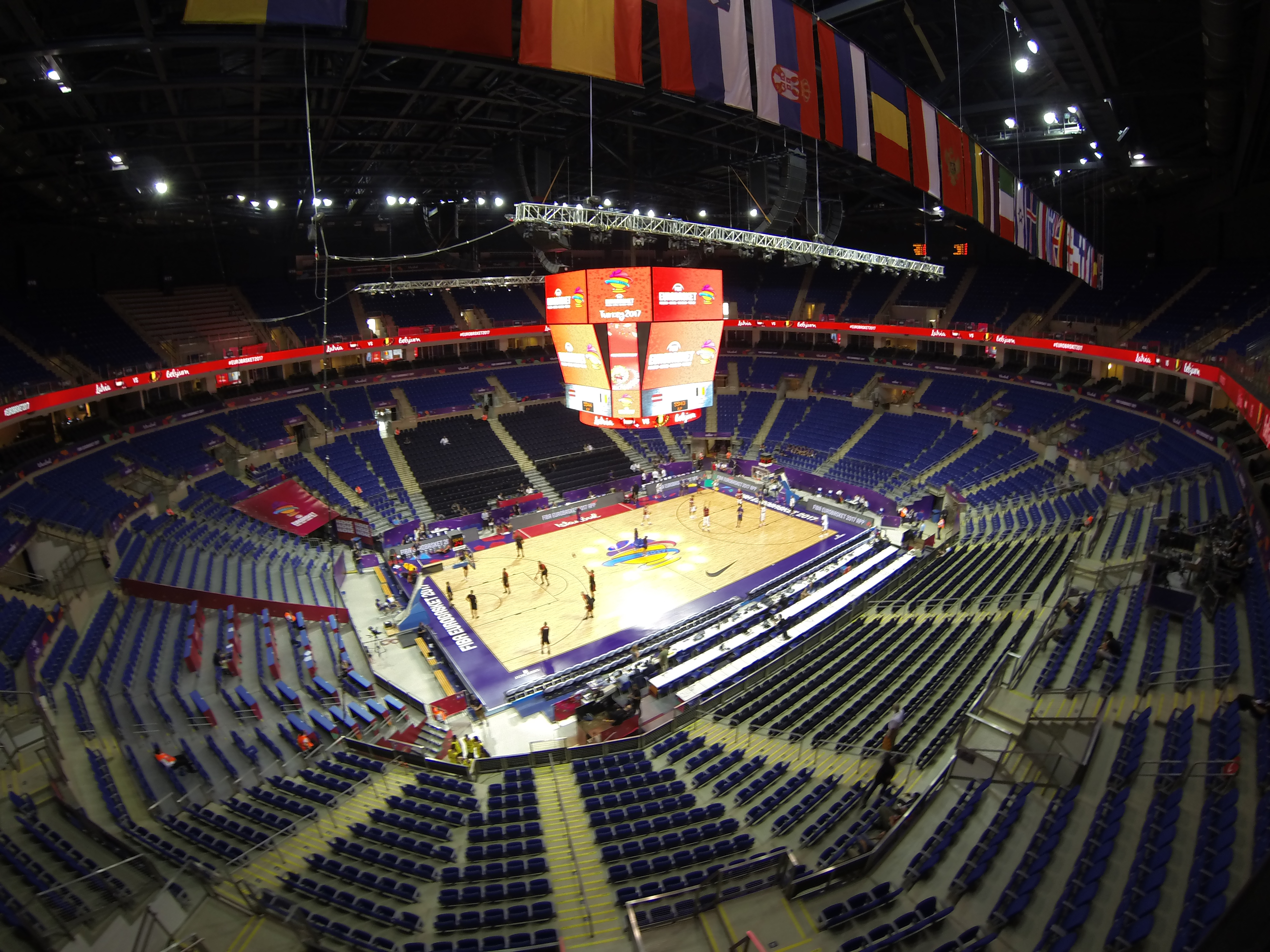
Ülker Sports Arena

The football team of Fenerbahçe play their home games at the Şükrü Saracoğlu Stadium (simply known as Kadıköy or Mabet ("shrine" in Turkish) among supporters) in Kızıltoprak, Kadıköy, Istanbul. The stadium was opened in 1908 and most recently renovated between 1999 and 2006. Its seating capacity is 50,509. The stadium does not have a running track around the pitch, which is unusual for a typical Turkish stadium.

The Ülker Sports Arena is a multi-purpose indoor arena in Ataşehir, Istanbul, with a capacity of 13,800 seats. The arena completed and opened in January 2012 after over two years of construction. Fenerbahçe's basketball team play their home games at the Ülker Sports Arena.

=== Training facilities ===
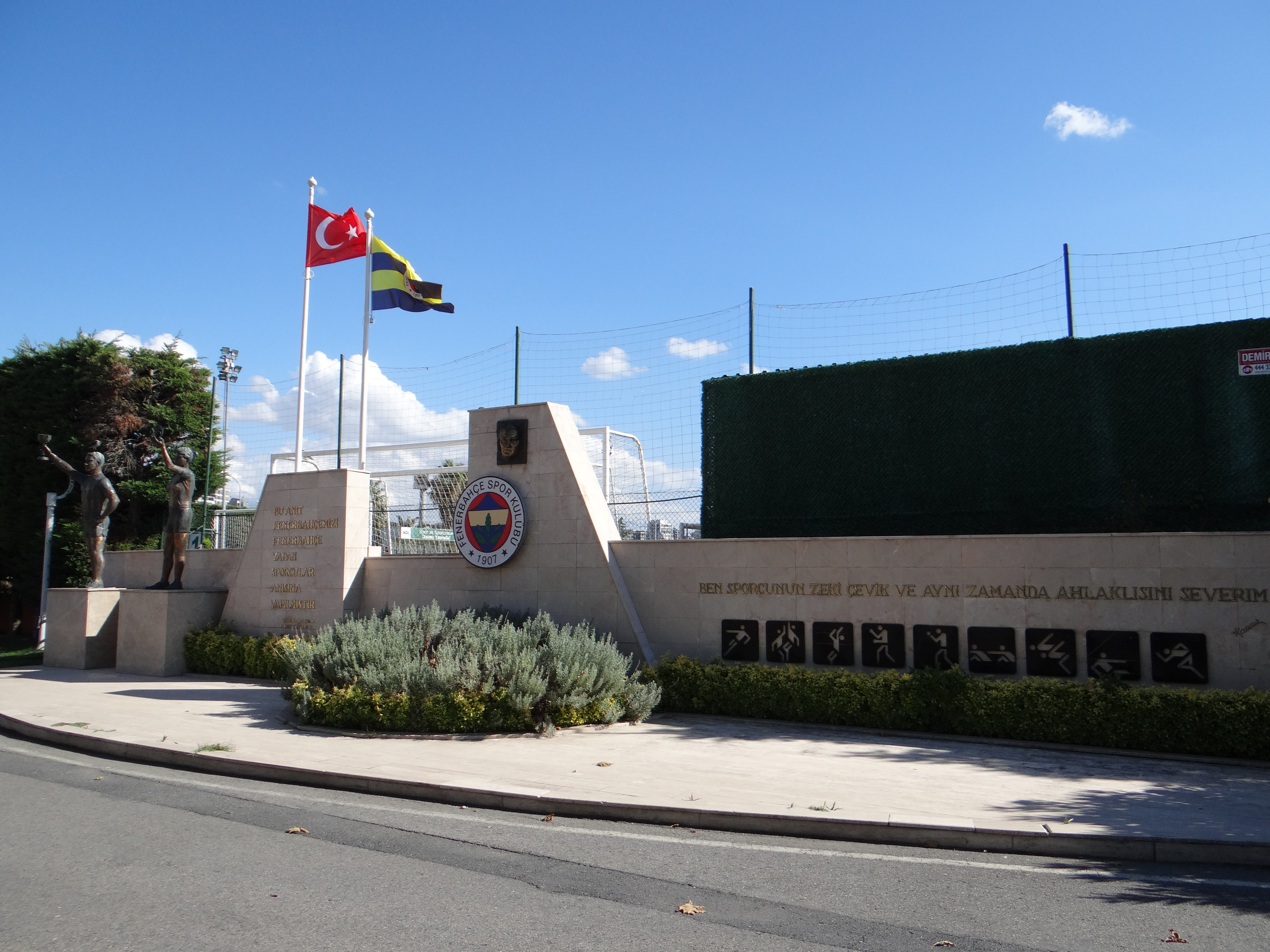
Lefter Küçükandonyadis Training Facilities entrance

The Can Bartu Training Facilities are a training complex located in Samandıra, Sancaktepe, Istanbul. The construction for this training complex began in 1997 during former president Ali Şen's presidency. The construction was completed in 2000. The football department of Fenerbahçe use the facilities.

The Lefter Küçükandonyadis Training Facilities are a large complex located at Dereağzı, Kadıköy, Istanbul. Re-opened in 1989 and renovated in 1998. Fenerbahçe's A2, U18, U17, U16, U15, and U14 teams play their home games in the complex. The facilities also serve the basketball, volleyball, athletics, boxing, rowing, and sailing departments. The area will be redeveloped into an 'olympic village' including an arena for the volleyball team.

The Topuk Yaylası Facilities are a training complex near a forest and a lake, located in the Topuk Plateau in Kaynaşlı, Düzce Province. The construction began in 2010 and was completed in 2011. All departments of the club use the complex for their pre-season trainings.

The Türk Telekom Ankara Facilities are a complex located in İncek in the suburbs of Ankara. The complex hosts Fenerbahçe's all departments that visit Ankara or a nearby locality for their games as well as other clubs.

The Samim Göreç Basketball Hall is a basketball hall with a training facility, located in the Lefter Küçükandonyadis Training Facilities in Dereağzı. First opened in 1982 and refurbished on 24 February 2001. The men's basketball and women's basketball departments of Fenerbahçe use the hall and the training facility for their trainings.

The Muhtar Sencer Volleyball Hall is a volleyball hall located in the Lefter Küçükandonyadis Training Facilities in Dereağzı. Fenerbahçe's men's volleyball and women's volleyball teams use the hall for their trainings.

The Vefa Küçük Swimming Pool is a semi-Olympic-sized swimming pool on the Fenerbahçe Isle. The pool was built by the former vice-president Vefa Küçük and opened on 16 July 1999, and serves the swimming department. There is also an Olympic-sized swimming pool located on the Fenerbahçe Isle, which was opened in 2004. The pool is also used by the swimming department of the club.

The Fikirtepe Facilities are located in Fikirtepe, Kadıköy. They opened on 1 July 1998 and serve the development of the youth football departments.

=== Fenerbahçe Museum ===
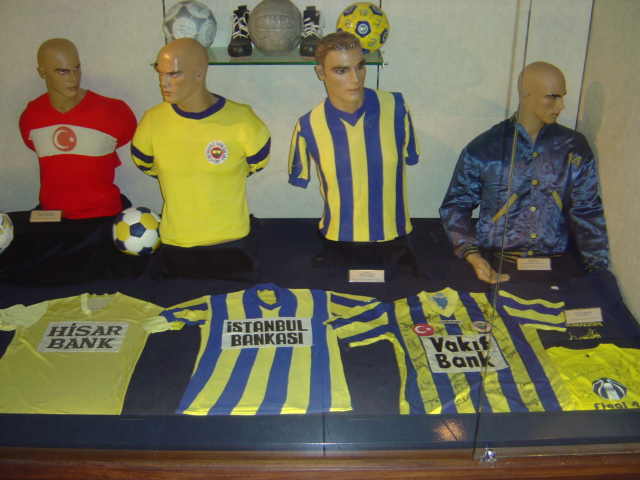
Old kits in the museum

The Fenerbahçe Museum (Turkish: Fenerbahçe Müzesi) is devoted to the history of the club. Founded in 1908 by Ali Rıza Bey, the museum is housed in the Şükrü Saracoğlu Stadium. Many of the trophies won by the club are on display there. There are 426 trophies on exhibition out of approximately 3.000 trophies won.

Also, Turkey's first basketball museum, "Fenerbahçe Basketball Museum", was opened at Ülker Sports and Event Hall.

=== Other facilities ===
The club's headquarters were initially located on the Fenerbahçe Isle near to the stadium. In 2006, the headquarters moved into the stadium to gather all the sections under one roof.

The Faruk Ilgaz Social Facilities are a social complex with an indoor hall, a restaurant, a patisserie, and an Olympic swimming pool, located next to the club's headquarters. They were initially opened on 15 May 1969 but rebuilt during the presidency of former president Aziz Yıldırım as a modern complex and re-opened on 21 January 2004.

The Fenerbahçe Guesthouse is an inn with a capacity of 60 guests. The inn also hosts new transfers. The Todori Facility is a restaurant owned and operated by the club, located in Kalamış, Kadıköy. The Entertainment and Recreation Center is located in the Faruk Ilgaz Social Facilities. The swimming pool is located in the Lefter Küçükandonyadis Training Facilities and hosts the club members and their families.

Fenerbahçe plans to develop the Kenan Evren High School land next to the stadium, building a shopping mall in Ataşehir next to the arena, and expanding Samandıra facilities.

== Media and brands ==
=== TV ===
Radyo Fenerbahçe
- Istanbul; Turkey
- Frequencies: 97.0 Istanbul; 97.0 Ankara; 97.0 Bursa; 97.0 Adapazarı; 99.2 Tekirdağ; 101.0 Balıkesir; 102.4 Çanakkale

Programming
- Format: Music radio

Ownership
- Owner: Fenerbahçe SK

History
- Former names: Fenerbahçe FM

Links
- Webcast: live.radyofenerbahce.org

Fenerbahçe TV (FB TV) is the first television channel of a sports club in Turkey. The channel launched in 2004 over satellite (Free-To-Air on Turksat 3A located 42° East, 11957 V 27500 5/6), D-Smart 82. Canal satellite network services and cable service.

=== Radio ===
Fenerbahçe Radyo (FB Radyo) is a nationwide FM radio network broadcasting from Istanbul. It is the first sports club radio station in Turkey. Broadcasting Pop Music in Turkish and other languages, FB Radyo can be listened to via terrestrial broadcast, Free-To-Air on Turksat 3A Satellite (located 42° East, 11804 V 24444 5/6, VPID: 516, APID:690, SPID:5), BlackBerry and iPhone applications.

=== Fenerium ===
Fenerium is the club's own company which markets licensed products and sponsors some of the club's departments and teams. The company was established in 2000. The headquarter is located in the Şükrü Saracoğlu Stadium in Istanbul.

Fenerium has 96 stores in total. 46 are based in Istanbul, 8 in Ankara, 4 in İzmir, 3 in Antalya, 2 in Adana, Aydın, Gaziantep, Hatay, Konya, Muğla, Sakarya, and Samsun. The other stores are located in Bursa, Çanakkale, Denizli, Diyarbakır, Düzce, Elazığ, Kahramanmaraş, Kayseri, Kocaeli, Malatya, Manisa, Mersin, Şanlıurfa, and Tekirdağ. There is one store serving abroad, located in Northern Cyprus (North Nicosia Fenerium).

== Supporters ==
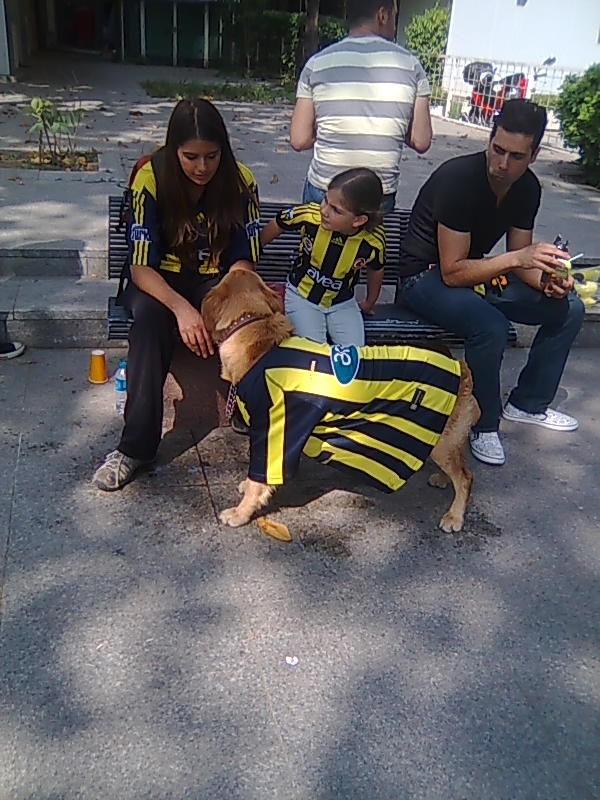
A family of Fener supporters

It has been estimated that; of the 30 million people interested in football in Turkey, 8 million 580 thousand are Fenerbahçe fans while another research suggests 32% of football fans in Turkey support Fener. The club has a strong following worldwide, both by the Turkish diaspora and non-Turks.

The main supporter groups are; Genç Fenerbahçeliler (ultras), 1907 ÜNİFEB (university youth) and 1907 Fenerbahçe (non-governmental organisation).

== Club officials ==
Position	Name
Chairman	(Turkey) Aziz Yıldırım
Deputy Chairman	(Turkey) Barış Göktürk
General Secretary	(Turkey) Mahmut Uslu
Board Member	(Turkey) Nihat Özbağı
Board Member	(Turkey) Mustafa Çağlar
Board Member	(Turkey) Ahmet Önder Fırat
Board Member	(Turkey) Cihan Kamer
Board Member	(Turkey) Fatih Öztürk
Board Member	(Turkey) Batuhan Özdemir
Board Member	(Turkey) Tanju Kaya
Board Member	(Turkey) Ahmet Murat İman
Board Member	(Turkey) Özgür Peker
Board Member	(Turkey) Yusuf Buğra Tanık
Board Member	(Turkey) Mehmet Aydın
Board Member	(Turkey) Mehmet Selim Kosif
Board Member	(Turkey) Fatih Aslan
Board Member	(Turkey) Volkan Akan
Board Member	(Turkey) Mustafa Aydın Acun
Board Member	(Turkey) Barış Karagöz
Board Member	(Turkey) Yasemin Babayiğit
Board Member	(Turkey) Savaş Adalet
Board Member	(Turkey) Demre İşçen
Board Member	(Turkey) Feridun Geçgel
Board Member	(Turkey) Mehmet İman
Board Member	(Turkey) İsmail Balcı
Board Member	(Turkey) Ömer Onan
Board Member	(Turkey) Abdullah Çiftçi

Last updated: 10 June 2026

=== Presidential history ===
Name (Note: Fenerbahçe have had numerous presidents over the course of their history, some of which have been the owners of the club, others have been honorary presidents.)	Period	Occupation
Ziya Songülen	1907–1908	#1 founding member, officer at the Ottoman Public Debt Administration
Ayetullah Bey	1908–1909	#2 founding member, officer at a water company
Tevfik Haccar Taşçı	1909–1910	Former athlete, businessman
Hakkı Saffet Tarı	1910–1911	Bank teller
^{HIH Prince} Shahzade Osman Fuad	1911–1912	Ottoman prince, the grandson of Sultan Murad V
^{Dr.} Hamit Hüsnü Kayacan	1912–1914	Internist
Mehmet Hulusi Bey	1914–1915	General manager at the Hejaz Railways
Mehmet Sabri Toprak	1915–1916	Secretary General at the Committee of Union and Progress
^{Dr.} Nazım Bey	1916–1918	Minister of Education of the Ottoman Empire
Ahmet Nuri Sekizinci	1918–1919	Playwright
^{HIH Prince} Shahzade Şehzade Ömer Faruk	1920–1923	Ottoman prince, son of the last caliph Abdulmejid II
Mehmet Sabri Toprak	1923–1924	Secretary General at the Committee of Union and Progress
Nasuhi Esat Baydar	1924–1925	Former athlete
Ali Naci Karacan	1926–1927	Journalist
Muvaffak Menemencioğlu	1928–1932	General manager at the Anatolian Agency
Sait Selahattin Cihanoğlu	1932–1933	Former athlete
Hayri Cemal Atamer	1933–1934	General secretary at Fenerbahçe SK
Şükrü Saracoğlu	1934–1950	Prime Minister of Turkey, Minister of Justice, Minister of Foreign Affairs, Minister of National Education, Minister of Finance
Ali Muhittin Hacı Bekir	1950–1952	Confectioner
Osman Kavrakoğlu	1952–1953	Former athlete, Lawyer, Deputy of Rize Province
Bedii Yazıcı	1953–1954	Former footballer, general manager at an insurance company
Osman Kavrakoğlu	1954–1955	Former athlete, Lawyer, Deputy of Rize Province
Zeki Rıza Sporel	1955–1958	Former athlete, Deputy of Istanbul Province, commercial man
Agah Erozan	1958–1960	Deputy of Bursa Province
Medeni Berk	1960	Minister of State, Deputy Prime Minister
Hasan Kamil Sporel	1960–1961	Former athlete
Razi Trak	1961–1962	Chairman of the board of the Yapı ve Kredi Bankası
^{Dr.} İsmet Uluğ	1962–1966	Ophthalmologist
Faruk Ilgaz	1966–1974	M.Sc. Civil engineer, Industrialist
Emin Cankurtaran	1974–1976	Industrialist
Faruk Ilgaz	1976–1980	M.Sc. Civil engineer, Industrialist
Razi Trak	1980–1981	Chairman of the board of the Yapı ve Kredi Bankası
Ali Haydar Şen	1981–1983	Businessman, Industrialist
Faruk Ilgaz	1983–1984	M.Sc. Civil engineer, Industrialist
Fikret Arıcan	1984–1986	Former footballer
Tahsin Kaya	1986–1989	Building contractor
Metin Aşık	1989–1993	Building contractor
Güven Sazak	1993–1994	Businessman, Building contractor
Hasan Özaydın	1994	Building contractor
Ali Haydar Şen	1994–1998	Businessman, Industrialist
Aziz Yıldırım	1998–2018	Civil engineer, Building contractor
Ali Y. Koç	2018–2025	Businessman, heir to Koç Holding
Steven Sadettin Saran	2025–2026	Athlete, Businessman
Aziz Yıldırım	2026–present	Civil engineer, Building contractor

== Sponsorship ==
Companies that Fenerbahçe SK currently have sponsorship deals with (as 4.09.2029):

Adidas
Ülker
Otokoç
Beko
Doğuş Group
Acıbadem
Denizbank
Tüpraş
Aygaz
Turkish Airlines
Chobani
Medicana
Cabir Holding

Audi
Damat Tween
Pürsu
Diversey
Nesine.com
Yandex
Hublot
Getir
Spor Toto
Burger King
Kimbo(Coffee Brand)
Tarfin
arsaVev

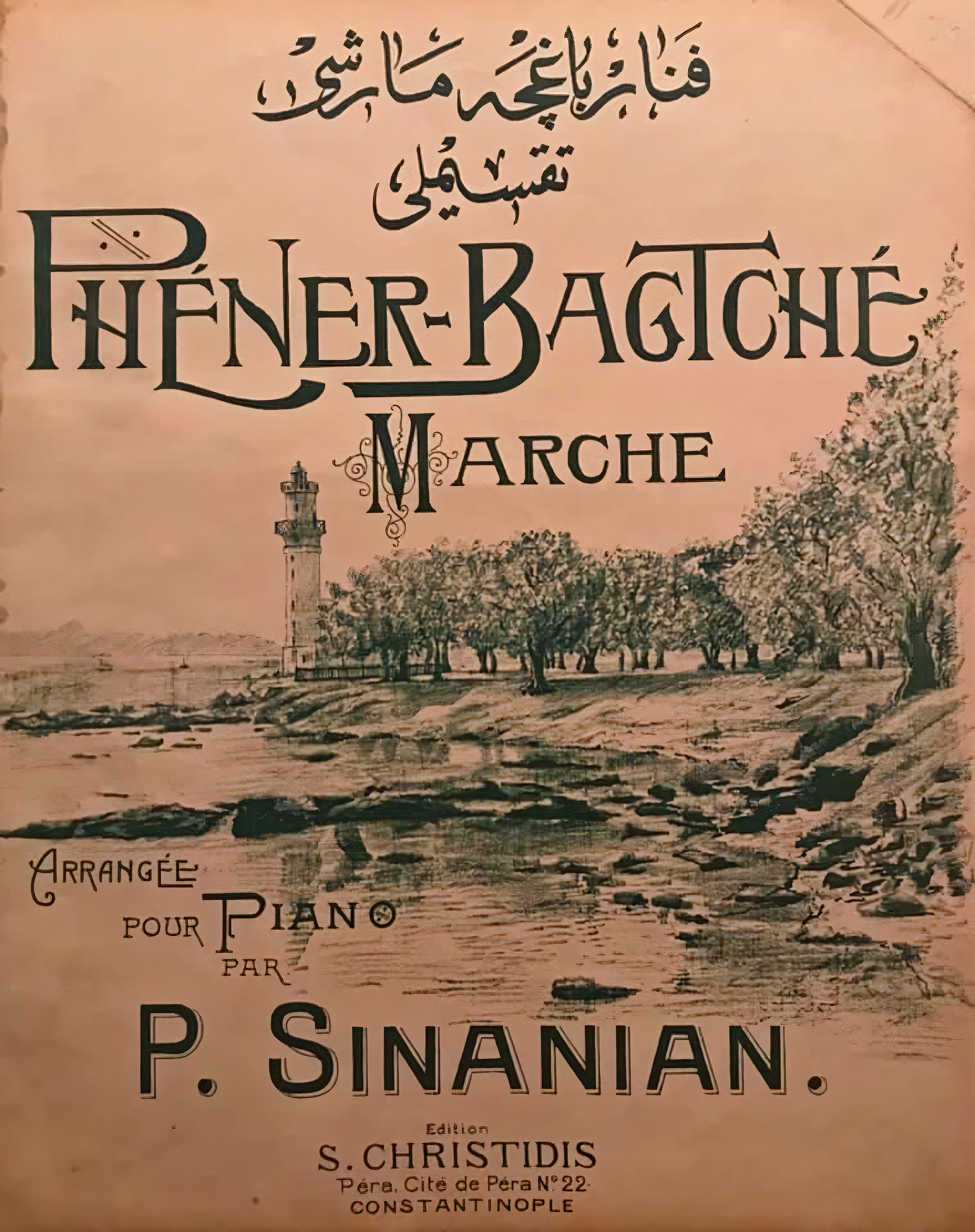
Cover of the '1909 First March'
