= Mehmet Sabri Toprak =

Turkish politician

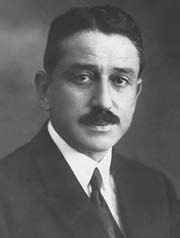

Minister of Agriculture
- Prime Minister: İsmet İnönü
- Preceded by: Hasan Fehmi Ataç
- Succeeded by: Mustafa Rahmi Köken

Member of the Grand National Assembly
- Constituency: Manisa (1923, 1927, 1931, 1935)

Member of the Chamber of Deputies
- Constituency: Saruhan - Manisa (1912, 1914)

Personal details
- Born: 1877 Manisa, Ottoman Empire
- Died: 19 February 1938 (aged 60–61)
- Party: Republican People's Party; Union and Progress Party

Mehmet Sabri Toprak (1877 – 19 February 1938) was a Turkish politician, and an early key member of the CHP.

== Career ==
Mehmet Sabri Toprak, a graduate from postal and telegraph division of Darüşşafaka High School, was one of the Balkanite originated students at Darussafaka. Toprak undertook some duties with various ranks at the Postal Service in accordance with his graduation and carried on the duty of Postal and Telegraph during the National Struggle. He has been at the parliament as a member of Union and Progress Party and was a board member of Fenerbahçe Sports Club. He had the chance to observe some innovations on postal and telegraph service by visiting Europe in different times. His reformist side could be easily seen in respect of the renovations which were transferred from Europe and Soviet Russia to Turkey in his ministry of agriculture period. Mehmet Sabri Toprak was also a cordial friend of Mustafa Kemal Atatürk and a member of parliament until 1938.

Mehmet Sabri at the Committee of Union and Progress in the establishment of Turkish football as a politician and in its development, it has the distinction of being a parliamentarian. The fact that most of the founders and directors of the Committee of Union and Progress were educated abroad, coming from Rumelia, Paris and London. The mass effect of football they know well. For this reason, Fırka started to be influential in the football community. The management took over. Mehmet Sabri Bey was the president of Fenerbahçe Sports Club during his first establishment years. In late 1914, Hamit Hüsnü Kayacan, Mehmet Sabri Bey, who took the presidency of Fenerbahçe upon the insistence of three months, "Belkıs Kotrası" who is the spoils of the enemy and a few futa ile Fenerbahçe has provided the full range of sports equipment. Mehmet Sabri Bey, Fenerbahce during the World War I kept alive during the years. Especially Following the closure of the Committee of Union and Progress, the whole library of Fırka was given to Fenerbahçe. Fenerbahçe took office Mustafa Elkatipzade states that "Mehmet Sabri Bey is a very honest person and he is doing a lot for Fenerbahçe."
