= Sporel =

Sporel is a Turkish surname. Notable people with the surname include:

- Hasan Kamil Sporel (1894–1968), Turkish footballer
- Zeki Rıza Sporel (1898–1969), Turkish footballer
