= Fenerbahçe University =

Private university in Ataşehir, Istanbul, Turkey

- Fenerbahçe Üniversitesi
- Type: Private
- Established: 17 March 2016 (as university)
- Affiliations: Fenerbahçe Sports Club, FBU Acadex, Fenerbahce International Student Partnership Association (ISPA)
- Rector: Prof. Dr. Fatma Kanca
- Students: 6000+
- Location: Ataşehir, Istanbul, Turkey
- Campus: ~100000 m²
- Language: English, Turkish
- Colors: Navy Blue Yellow
- Website: fbu.edu.tr Fenerbahce University
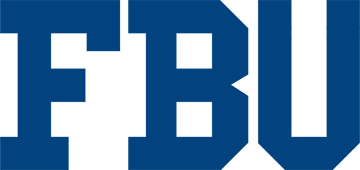

Fenerbahçe University (Turkish: Fenerbahçe Üniversitesi; FBU) is a private university in Istanbul established by the relevant foundation of the Fenerbahçe Sports Club.

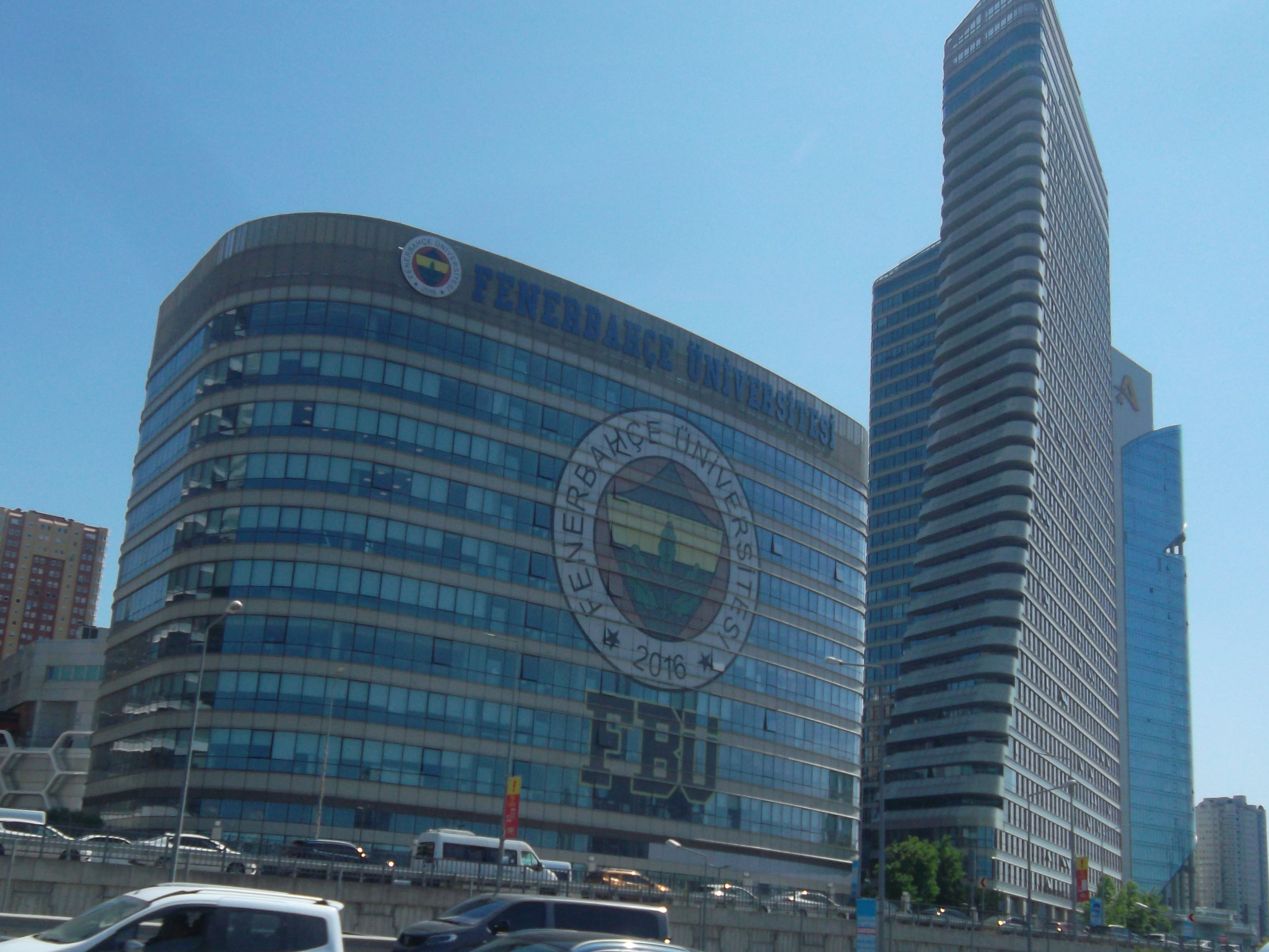
Main campus in Ataşehir

At Fenerbahçe Faruk Ilgaz Facilities in April 2016; the workshop on its establishment, management and operation started. In the first year of accepting students, Medicana Group invested ₺100M. Security of the campus network and Internet of Things technologies were carried out with Aruba, a Hewlett Packard Enterprise company. In 2020, it started to contribute to the National Combat Aircraft Project, which is carried out in cooperation with TÜBİTAK and TUSAŞ. Faculty of Communication students; In December 2019, started the social responsibility project "Neither Child Neither Adolescent" and place in the Young Spokesperson of the Environment Competition organized by the International Environment Foundation in February 2020 won the first.

== Fenerbahce University Tuition ==
Fenerbahce University tuition fees for a bachelor's degree equals to 5.000,00 USD per year; pharmacy costs 10,000.00 USD per year.

== See also ==
- Council of Higher Education (Turkey) (YÖK)
- Education in Turkey
