= Ilgaz (disambiguation) =

Ilgaz is a town in Çankırı Province in the Central Anatolia region of Turkey.

Ilgaz may also refer to:

- Ilgaz District, Çankırı Province
- Ilgaz Mountains, mountain range in northwestern Anatolia, between Çankırı and Kastamonu Provinces
- Abdullah Ilgaz (born 1998), Turkish para-athlete
- Faruk Ilgaz (1922–2014), Turkish politician
- Rıfat Ilgaz (1911–1993), Turkish poet
