= 1907 Fenerbahçe =

Fenerbahçe S.K. organization (e. 1992)

1907 Fenerbahçe Derneği
- Formation: 1992
- Founder: Mustafa Koç
- Type: non-governmental organization
- Headquarters: Istanbul, Turkey
- Affiliations: Fenerbahçe S.K.
- Website: 1907.org

1907 Fenerbahçe Association (Turkish: 1907 Fenerbahçe Derneği) is an association founded in 1992 by businesspeople and managers from the Fenerbahçe community. The association's primary goal is to provide material and moral support, as well as to contribute to the Fenerbahçe Sports Club. It is a platform where businesspeople and managers, who are well-versed in Fenerbahçe culture can participate in the club's management.

The association aims to modernize the club's structure with the aspiration of matching global standards. It focuses on ensuring that Fenerbahçe has sustainable financial resources based on its own income. 1907 Fenerbahçe Association devises strategies for Fenerbahçe Sports Club, emphasizing institutionalization, integration, and establishment issues.

In 2016, the Fenerbahçe Esports branch was established with the association playing an initiating role.

== History ==
The association took over the management of the Fenerbahçe Basketball Team in 1993 and generated a fund of $11 million within four years. In 2007, through the association's initiatives, the club emblem, unregistered for 90 years, was officially registered. Simultaneously, resources were allocated for the establishment of Fenerium. Between 1994 and 2002, the association initiated ticket sales for the Şükrü Saracoğlu Stadium VIP tribune (1907 Tribune).

In 2002, the association produced the documentary Lantern in the Garden, directed by Can Dündar, with all proceeds directly benefiting the club. The association also launched the "UNİFEB" project, bringing together university student Fenerbahçe fans under one roof. Beyond its contributions to Fenerbahçe, the association engages in social activities and provides assistance. Notably, in collaboration with the Turkish Education Volunteers Foundation, it covered the educational expenses of 500 students.

The 1907 Tribune, with 1,295 sets, was established at Fenerbahçe Şükrü Saracoğlu Stadium, inaugurated in March 2006. During Ali Koç's presidency, the association facilitated the publication of the book Asr-ı Fener, chronicling the club's history, and launched the "Fener For Justice!" campaign, which garnered nearly 1 million digital signatures.

It has become a tradition for the association, which upholds the ideals of Kemalism, to visit Anıtkabir with fan groups during the 10th of November Atatürk commemoration day and Atatürk weeks.

== ÜNİFEB ==
Üniversiteli Fenerbahçeliler Birliği (ÜNİFEB) is a student-based supporter organization in Turkey, composed of university students who support Fenerbahçe Sports Club. Established in 2001, the group aims to unite Fenerbahçe fans in higher education under a shared identity, promoting sportsmanship, club loyalty, and social responsibility. ÜNİFEB organizes various activities including match gatherings, charity events, cultural programs, and volunteer initiatives across numerous university campuses in Turkey and abroad. In 2006, ÜNİFEB officially merged with the **1907 Fenerbahçe Association**, one of the club’s most prominent civil society groups, becoming its youth branch. This merger provided institutional support and expanded ÜNİFEB’s influence, allowing for broader participation in social projects and stronger representation within the Fenerbahçe community.
