= Fenerbahçe TV =

Sports TV channel in Turkey

Fenerbahçe Televizyonu
- Country: Turkey
- Broadcast area: Turkey; European Union; United States
- Affiliates: Radio Fenerbahçe
- Headquarters: Kadıköy, Istanbul, Turkey

Programming
- Language(s): Turkish
- Picture format: 576i (16:9 SDTV); 1080i (HDTV)

Ownership
- Owner: Fenerbahçe S.K.

History
- Launched: 19 January 2003

Links
- Website: www.fenerbahce.org/fbtv

Fenerbahçe TV (FB TV) is a sports channel of Fenerbahçe SK, a major Turkish multi-sport club based in Istanbul, Turkey. It is the first sports club channel in Turkey. The channel launched in 2003, over satellite, satellite network services and cable service.

The daily programs are Live News, Futbolun Zirvesi (live program with president Aziz Yıldırım), 2F1B, Biz Bir Aileyiz (about the family life of athletes), Café Fener (about the daily life of athletes), Eko Fener (about daily economy news), Endüstriyel Spor (about "industrial" sports), Filede Fener (about volleyball), Potada Fener (about basketball), Genç Kramponlar (about the youth teams), Maç Kaç Kaç, Maça Doğru, Maç Başlıyor, Maçın Ardından, Maçın Öyküsü (all five are about weekly football matches), Nostalji Futbol (about past memorable matches), Yaşayan Efsaneler (about the lives of living legends) etc.

The live programs of TV are daily news, women's basketball, men's and women's volleyball, youth football, athletics, boxing, rowing and sailing live games and matches and news before matches.

== Commentators/Presenters ==
- Kıvanç Özkök
- Serhan Hayat
- Barış Yalçınsoy
- Turhan Seven
- Derin Uçar
- Pınar Emanet
- İnci Hangül
- Nihat Mangura
- Umut Bilgen

== Services ==
- Satellite
  - Türksat 4A 12345 V 30000 3/4
  - Digiturk : Channel 76
  - D-Smart : Channel 83
- Cable
  - Teledünya : Channel 139
