= Mustafa Elkatipzade =

Turkish football manager

Personal information
- Date of birth: 1889
- Place of birth: Tunisia
- Date of death: 4 March 1967 (aged 77–78)
- Place of death: Istanbul, Turkey

Managerial career
- Years: Team
- 1921–1924: Fenerbahçe

Mustafa Elkatipzade (1889 – 4 March 1967) was a Turkish football manager. He managed Fenerbahçe between 1921 and 1924 He won the 1922–23 Istanbul League Championship. He was also the manager of the General Harington Cup squad.

He founded the first youth team in Turkish football history. He also founded the Fenerbahçe S.K. Academy and managed the youngsters between 1909 and 1911. Zeki Rıza Sporel, Hasan Kamil Sporel and Hikmet Topuzer played in the academy under his management.

He was also a member of the Committee of Union and Progress and is known for sacking all the players who refused to join the army during the Turkish War of Independence.

He died on 4 March 1967.
