= Hasan Fehmi Ataç =

Turkish politician (1879–1961)

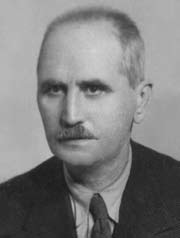

Minister of Finance
- In office 24 April 1922 – 2 January 1924
- Prime Minister: Fevzi Çakmak; Rauf Orbay; Ali Fethi Okyar; İsmet İnönü; Ali Fethi Okyar
- Preceded by: Office established
- Succeeded by: Abdülhalik Renda

Minister of Agriculture, Food and Livestock
- In office 22 November 1924 – 2 March 1925
- Prime Minister: Ali Fethi Okyar
- Preceded by: Şükrü Kaya
- Succeeded by: Mehmet Sabri Toprak

Personal details
- Born: Hasan Fehmi; 1879 Gümüşhane, Trebizond Vilayet, Ottoman Empire
- Died: 16 September 1961 (aged 82)
- Awards: Medal of Independence with Red-Green Ribbon
- Nickname: Ataç

Hasan Fehmi Ataç (Note: Hasan Fehmi was one of two members of the Turkish parliament who was named as such. Therefore, he went by his nickname "Ataç".) (1879 – 16 September 1961) was a Turkish politician and a member of both the Grand National Assembly of the Republic of Turkey (the Turkish Parliament) and the earlier Chamber of Deputies of the Ottoman Empire (the lower house of the Ottoman Parliament). As a member of both parliaments, Hasan Fehmi was a deputy representing Gümüşhane, the place of his birth.

After his career in the Grand National Assembly, Hasan Fehmi was appointed by Mustafa Kemal Atatürk to be the Minister of Agriculture and Minister of Finance. Later in life, he was awarded the Medal of Independence with Red-Green Ribbon for his services to the Republic of Turkey.

== Early life and career ==
Hasan Fehmi was born in Gümüşhane in 1879 and was the son of Kadirbeyzade Mehmed Salim Bey. Fehmi went on to receive his local education at the high school located in the Süleymaniye district of Gümüşhane. In his later life, however, Fehmi did not have an opportunity to attain higher education. Soon thereafter, Fehmi became a politician and a member of the Chamber of Deputies of the Ottoman Empire from Gümüşhane in its second and third sessions during the disintegrating Empire's Second Constitutional Era, and after the fall of the Ottoman Empire, became a deputy in the newly established Republic of Turkey. He served as deputy of Gümüşhane in the first period of the convening of the Grand National Assembly until the eighth period. On 17 October 1920, during his career as a deputy, Fehmi provided important testimony concerning the Armenian deportations during a secret conference in the national assembly:

"As you know the [Armenian] deportations were an event that triggered a worldwide outcry and caused us to be regarded as murderers. Before embarking upon it we knew that the Christian world would not indulge us and would direct its full wrath and deep-seated enmity against us on account of it. Why have we then [opted for] appending to ourselves the label of murderers (Neden katillik unvanını nefsimize izafe ettik)? Why have we involved ourselves in such a grave and difficult conflict? We acted thusly simply to ensure the future of our country that we consider to be dearer and more sacred to us than our own lives."

During the testimony, Mustafa Kemal Atatürk, the first president of the Republic of Turkey, presided over the national assembly. Fehmi also provided testimony regarding the confiscation of Armenians goods and property during another secret session of the national assembly:

"Not a single Muslim's good were liquidated, you can establish these facts by examining the old records of the secret deliberations. The Parliament at that time secretly secured reassurances from the Finance Minister that the law would not apply to Muslims who had fled as a result of war. Only after registering this assurance did we proclaim to the world that law. Presently, we are repeating that procedure."

Amid protests that he was uneducated, Fehmi was appointed by Atatürk as the Finance Minister on 24 April 1922 and served until 2 January 1925. During his career as a Finance Minister, Fehmi managed to provide needed provisions of the Turkish army after Turkish War of Independence. After serving as Finance Minister for three years, Fehmi became the Minister of Agriculture between 22 November 1924 and 3 March 1925.

Fehmi was married and had one child.

He was also awarded the Medal of Independence with Red-Green Ribbon.

Fehmi died on 16 September 1961 at the age of 82.

== See also ==
- Mustafa Kemal Atatürk
- Turkish National Movement
- Chamber of Deputies (Ottoman Empire)
- Witnesses and testimonies of the Armenian genocide
