= Tevfik Taşçı =

Turkish footballer and president

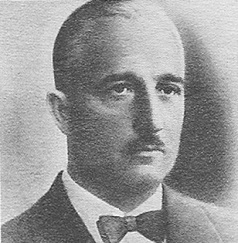
Tevfik Haccar Taşçı

Tevfik Haccar Taşçı (1890 Kadıköy, Istanbul – Istanbul 1979) was a Turkish footballer, who was among the first squads of Fenerbahçe. He was the third president of the major Turkish multi-sport club Fenerbahçe SK between 1909 and 1910. He also introduced the sport of tennis to the club.
