= Hamit Hüsnü Kayacan =

Turkish intellectual and sports executive

Hamit Hüsnü
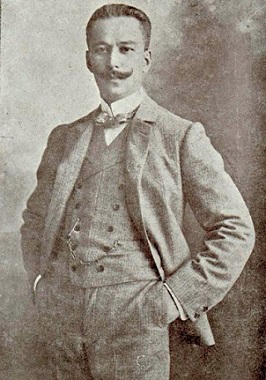
- Born: 1868; Istanbul, Kadıköy, Ottoman Empire
- Died: 1952 (aged 83–84); Istanbul, Turkey

Hamit Hüsnü Kayacan (1868, Kadıköy, Istanbul – 1952, Istanbul) was a Turkish intellectual and sports executive, who played a major role in the development of football in Turkey. He was the older brother of Fuat Hüsnü Kayacan. Being one of the principal founders of Galatasaray SK, he left the club after a disagreement with the Galatasaray board members and switched to Fenerbahçe SK which he also served as a president.
