= Hikmet Topuzer =

Turkish footballer (1893–1958)

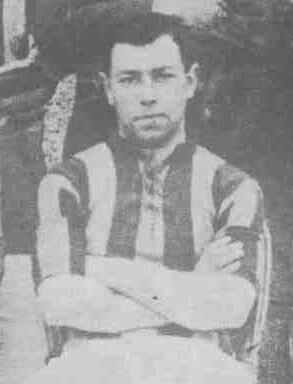
A photograph of Hikmet Topuzer, taken in 1913 when he was in the Fenerbahce squad invited to their country by the Tsarist Russia football teams. (In Odessa)

Hikmet Topuzer, commonly known as Topuz Hikmet, (1893 – 13 May 1958) was a Turkish football player for Fenerbahçe between 1912 and 1915. The Fenerbahçe emblem, which he created in 1914, is used today. He played as a right winger or right forward. He was the uncle of artist Fikret Muallâ Saygı.

== The Emblem ==
Fenerbahce's logo, created by Hikmet Bey in 1914 and used until the Turkish Alphabet Reform in 1928, is still used in the same form today.

When he was playing for Fenerbahçe around 1914, he designed the Fenerbahçe emblem. Hikmet Topuzer, describes the story of the emblem as below:

After the change of the club's colours from yellow and white to yellow and navy, it was an issue to create an emblem with our new colours. My friends left the design of this emblem to me. Firstly, I brought together the colours of our national flag, red and white. Then drew a heart shape over the red and gave it a yellow and navy colour, adding an acorn leaf that represents resistance, power and strength. I wrote the club name and foundation date on the white section. When drawing our emblem, I tried to give this meaning: Serving the club with dependence from heart. The design was favored by my friends and our new emblem was made through the guidance of Tevfik Haccar, who was in Germany at time. After the new alphabet was approved, the design was protected, but the club name on the emblem was changed to Fenerbahçe Spor Kulübü ★ 1907 ★
