= Faruk Ilgaz =

Turkish politician (1922–2014)

Mayor of Istanbul
- In office 12 March 1968 – 6 June 1968
- Preceded by: Haşim İşçan
- Succeeded by: Fahri Atabey

President of Fenerbahçe SK
- In office 1966–1974
- Preceded by: İsmet Uluğ
- Succeeded by: Emin Cankurtaran
- In office 1976–1980
- Preceded by: Emin Cankurtaran
- Succeeded by: Razi Trak
- In office 1983–1984

Personal details
- Born: 1922
- Died: 16 July 2014 (aged 92) Istanbul, Turkey

Faruk Ilgaz (1922 – 16 July 2014) was the chairman of Türkiye Süper Lig club Fenerbahçe SK from 1966 to 1974 and from 1976 to 1980.

He was also Mayor of Istanbul Province Municipality between 12 March 1968 – 6 June 1968. He died in 2014.
