= Hasan Kamil Sporel =

Turkish footballer

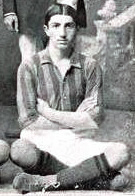
- Hasan Kamil Sporel (1911–12 season)

Personal information
- Full name: Hasan Kamil Sporel
- Date of birth: 1894
- Place of birth: Istanbul, Ottoman Empire
- Date of death: 17 April 1969 (aged 75)
- Place of death: Istanbul, Turkey
- Position: Defender

Senior career*
Years	Team	Apps	(Gls)
1911–1934	Fenerbahçe		

International career
1923	Turkey	1	(0)
- * Club domestic league appearances and goals

Hasan Kamil Sporel (1894 – 27 April 1969) was a Turkish footballer. He played as a defender for Fenerbahçe and the Turkey national football team.

Starting in 1911, Hasan Kamil played his entire career for Fenerbahçe. He was the first player to score in a derby against Galatasaray and was the first captain of the national team in a game against Romania in 1923.

He moved to the United States to pursue graduate studies. He is the older brother of Zeki Rıza Sporel, a player and president of Fenerbahçe S.K.
