= 1991 in association football =

The following are the football (soccer) events of the year 1991 throughout the world.

== Events ==
- UEFA Champions League 1991: Red Star Belgrade wins 5–3 on penalties over Olympique de Marseille after 0–0 draw.
- FIFA Women's World Cup – United States wins 2–1 over Norway
- For the first time since the Heysel Stadium disaster of 1985, English clubs are allowed to participate in competitions sponsored by UEFA, for the 1991–1992 season.
- 6 March – Feyenoord Rotterdam's coaching staff, led by Gunder Bengtsson and Pim Verbeek, is fired and replaced by former player Wim Jansen.
- 29 March – Diego Maradona is banned for fifteen months in the Italian Serie A after failing a drug test on cocaine.
- 18 May – Tottenham Hotspur wins 2–1 (after extra-time) over Nottingham Forest to claim the FA Cup.
- 2 June – Feyenoord Rotterdam claims the KNVB Cup by defeating FC Den Bosch in its own stadium, De Kuip. The only goal is scored by Rob Witschge in the 8th minute. The last seven minutes of the second half are cancelled due to hooligans invading the pitch.
- 5 June – Copa Libertadores is won by Colo-Colo after defeating Olimpia Asunción on an aggregate score of 3–0.
- 19 June – Slovenia plays its first ever international match, losing 1–0 to neighbouring Croatia in Murska Sobota.
- 25 September – Asgeir Eliasson makes his debut as the manager of Iceland with a 2–0 win over Spain.
- 4 December – Peter Bosz makes his debut for the Netherlands national football team, replacing striker Wim Kieft after 85 minutes in the game against Greece.
- 8 December – Red Star Belgrade wins the Intercontinental Cup in Tokyo, Japan by defeating Chile's Colo-Colo 3–0. Vladimir Jugović scores twice for the Yugoslavs.

== Winner club national championships ==
=== Asia ===
- Qatar – Al-Arabi

=== Europe ===
- England – Arsenal
- France – Olympique de Marseille
- Germany – 1. FC Kaiserslautern
- Italy – Sampdoria
- Netherlands – PSV Eindhoven
- Portugal – S.L. Benfica
- Scotland – Rangers
- Soviet Union – CSKA Moscow
- Spain – Barcelona
- Turkey – Beşiktaş

=== North American ===
- Canada – Vancouver 86ers (CSL)
- Mexico – UNAM
- United States – San Francisco Bay Blackhawks (APSL)

=== South America ===
- Argentina
  - 1990/1991 – Newell's Old Boys
  - Apertura 1991 – River Plate
- Bolivia – Bolívar
- Brazil – São Paulo
- Paraguay – Sol de América

== International tournaments ==
- Baltic Cup in Klaipėda, Lithuania
  1. Lithuania
  2. Latvia
  3. Estonia
- CONCACAF Gold Cup in Los Angeles and Pasadena, United States
  1. United States
  2. Honduras
  3. Mexico
- Pan American Games in Havana, Cuba
  1. United States
  2. Mexico
  3. Cuba
- FIFA U-17 World Championship in Italy
  1. Ghana
  2. Spain
  3. Argentina
- Copa América in Chile
  1. Argentina
  2. Brazil
  3. Chile
- UNCAF Nations Cup in San José, Costa Rica
  1. Costa Rica
  2. Honduras
  3. Guatemala
- FIFA Women's World Cup in China
  1. United States
  2. Norway
  3. Sweden

== Births ==
=== January ===
- 1 January:
  - Michael Lucky Kelechuckwu, Nigerian footballer
  - Stéphane Okou, Ivorian footballer
- 2 January
  - Luis Pedro Cavanda, Belgian footballer
  - Sergei Petrov, Russian football player
  - Davide Santon, Italian footballer
- 5 January:
  - Denis Alibec, Romanian footballer
  - Soner Aydoğdu, Turkish footballer
  - Juan Falchi, Uruguayan footballer
  - Rahel Kiwic, Swiss footballer
  - Dani Pacheco, Spanish footballer
- 7 January:
  - Eden Hazard, Belgian football player
  - Adaon Kalalla, Belgian footballer
  - Alen Stevanović, Swiss-Serbian footballer
- 8 January:
  - Jorge Enríquez, Mexican international
  - Emiliano Tabone, Argentinian footballer
- 9 January: Nicola Hatefi, Belgian-Iranian footballer
- 13 January: Juan Mbo Ondo, Equatoguinean footballer
- 17 January: Santiago Fernández, Uruguayan footballer
- 20 January: Rouven Meschede, German former professional footballer
- 21 January:
  - Mohammad Ghadir, Arab-Israeli footballer
  - Alfredo Ortuño, Spanish footballer
  - Luis Alfonso Rodríguez, Mexican international
- 24 January: Ali Kireş, Turkish footballer
- 26 January: Milad Fayyazbakhsh, Iranian footballer

=== February ===
- 3 February: Peter Pawlett, English footballer
- 8 February:
  - Nicholas Killas, South African footballer
  - Aristidis Soiledis, Greek footballer
  - Roberto Soriano, Italian footballer
- 12 February: Damian Skołorzyński, Polish footballer
- 14 February:
  - Daniela Mona Lambin, Estonian footballer
  - Chris Rowney, English club footballer
- 16 February: Sergio Canales, Spanish footballer
- 20 February:
  - Giovanni Kyeremateng, Italian footballer
  - Antonio Pedroza, English-Mexican footballer
  - Christopher Tvrdy, Austrian footballer
- 22 February: Hayri Sevimli, German former professional footballer
- 25 February: Marco Muraccini, former San Marino international footballer

=== March ===
- 5 March
  - Ramiro Funes Mori, Argentine footballer
  - Rogelio Funes Mori, Argentine footballer
- 7 March: Ivan Bobylev, former Russian professional footballer
- 14 March: Mladen Ličina, Serbian footballer
- 20 March: Nkanyiso Madonsela, South African soccer player
- 23 March: Jorge Iván Bocanegra, Colombian footballer
- 27 March: Jesse-Juho Kuusisto, Finnish footballer
- 29 March: Zakaria Amrani, Dutch footballer

=== April ===
- 10 April: Michael La Rosa, Belgian former professional footballer
- 11 April: Niall Canavan, English-born Irish footballer
- 12 April: Deivison (Deivison William Borges), Brazilian footballer
- 20 April:
  - Dariusz Góral, Polish former professional footballer
  - Ondřej Kraják, Czech footballer
- 21 April: Hussein El Husseiny, Egyptian professional footballer
- 30 April: Iakob Apkhazava, Georgian professional footballer

=== May ===
- 1 May
  - Abdisalam Ibrahim, Norwegian footballer
  - Bartosz Salamon, Polish footballer
- 11 May: Milton Raphael, Brazilian professional footballer
- 14 May:
  - Niklas Hörber, German former professional footballer
  - Ahmed Saif, Emirati footballer
- 17 May: Aybars Garhan, Turkish footballer
- 20 May: Brandon Saldaña, American-born footballer
- 25 May: Yasin Öztop, Turkish footballer
- 27 May: Filip Starzyński, Polish international footballer
- 30 May: Markus Gröger, German former footballer

=== June ===
- 2 June: Sèrge Brou, Ivorian footballer
- 3 June:
  - Łukasz Teodorczyk, Polish international
  - Kenechuhwu Uchenwa, Nigerian footballer
- 5 June: Facundo Cabrera, Uruguayan footballer
- 10 June: George Sofroni, Romanian footballer
- 13 June: Irvin Museng, Indonesian former footballer
- 16 June: Héctor Pérez (Héctor Eduardo Pérez Cuevas), Venezuelan footballer
- 21 June:
  - Gaël Kakuta, Congolese professional footballer
  - César Taján, Colombian club footballer
- 23 June: Fakhreddine Ben Youssef, Tunisian international striker
- 25 June: Luca Flavio Artaria, Italian professional footballer
- 28 June: Kevin De Bruyne, Belgian international

=== July ===
- 1 July:
  - Gunel Mutallimova, Azerbaijani footballer
  - Lucas Vázquez, Spanish footballer
- 7 July: Jennie Wecksell, Swedish footballer
- 10 July: Antonio Franco, Paraguayan footballer
- 13 July: Khairu Azrin Khazali, Malaysian footballer
- 15 July: Dale Lee, Montserratian international footballer
- 16 July: Andros Townsend, English international
- 20 July: Cristian Pulido, Colombian footballer
- 21 July: Tuan Muhamad Faim, Malaysian footballer
- 23 July: Dedi Kusnandar, Indonesian footballer
- 24 July: Riku Matsuda, Japanese club footballer

=== August ===
- 3 August: Malin Ahlberg, Swedish footballer
- 6 August: Michel Ternest, Belgian footballer
- 10 August: Mohamed Aleem, Sri Lankan international footballer
- 12 August: Erik Fabbri, Italian footballer
- 13 August: Juan Carlos Lueiza, Chilean footballer
- 15 August: Filip Mladenović, Serbian football player
- 19 August: Maxime Rousseau, French footballer
- 20 August:
  - Arseny Logashov, Russian international
  - Luke O'Neill, English youth international
  - Mario Tičinović, Croatian youth international
- 24 August: Filip Kinček, Slovak footballer
- 25 August: Gershon Koffie, Ghanaian youth international

=== September ===
- 4 September: Toshiro Yatsuzuka, retired Japanese footballer
- 7 September: Matteo Lignani, Italian professional footballer
- 11 September: Jordan Ayew, French-born Ghanaian footballer

=== October ===
- 10 October:
  - Manuel Giandonato, Italian footballer
  - Xherdan Shaqiri, Swiss footballer
- 11 October: Iván Jiménez, Spanish footballer
- 24 October: Torstein Andersen Aase, Norwegian striker
- 25 October: Manuel Schönhuber, German goalkeeper

=== November ===
- 5 November: Stefan Ninčić, Serbian footballer
- 9 November: João Filipe Poceiro, Swiss footballer
- 14 November: Jucélio, São Toméan footballer
- 25 November: Luca Tremolada, Italian youth international

=== December ===
- 5 December: Breno Matosinhos, Brazilian professional footballer
- 6 December: Arnold Mampori, Botswana footballer
- 7 December: Jermaine van Pijkeren, Dutch footballer
- 15 December: Sandra Lindkvist, Swedish footballer

== Deaths ==
=== February ===
- 24 February
  - Georges Capdeville (91), French football referee
  - Héctor Rial (62), Spanish footballer

=== March ===
- 9 March – Ely do Amparo, Brazilian defender, runner-up at the 1950 FIFA World Cup. (69)

=== May ===
- 31 May – Rubens Josué da Costa, Brazilian forward, Brazilian squad member at the 1954 FIFA World Cup. (62)

=== July ===
- 27 July – Gino Colaussi, Italian striker, winner of the 1938 FIFA World Cup, scoring two goals in the final. (77)

=== August ===
- 9 August – Schubert Gambetta, Uruguayan defender, winner of the 1950 FIFA World Cup. (71)
- 30 August – Adão Nunes Dornelles, Brazilian striker, runner-up at the 1950 FIFA World Cup. (68)

=== October ===
- 11 October – Pietro Ferraris, Italian striker, winner of the 1938 FIFA World Cup. (79)

=== November ===
- 15 November – Sylvio Hoffmann, Brazilian midfielder, Brazilian squad member at the 1934 FIFA World Cup. (83)
