= Amrani =

Amrani or El Amrani (Lamrani) is an Arabic surname literally meaning "from Amran". Amrani (عمراني), El Amrani ( العمراني) or Al Imrani ( العمراني) are the same surname. Their father is Omran Sharif (عمران الشريف), son of Emir Idris II ( مولاي إدريس الثاني), himself son of the founder of the Idrisid dynasty, Emir Idris I ( مولاي إدريس الأول) of Morocco.

Notable people with the surname include:

== Amrani ==
- Abdelmoula Ali Amrani
- Abdelkader Amrani
- Abderrahmane Amrani
- Djamel Amrani
- Farida Amrani
- Mosab Amrani
- Yasmina Amrani
- Yossi Amrani
- Youssef Amrani
- Zakaria Amrani

== El Amrani ==
- Ahmed El Amrani
- Hicham El Amrani
- Hicham El Amrani (sports executive)
- Issandr El Amrani
- Mohammed bin Ismail Al Amrani
- Reda El Amrani
- Ali El Amrani

== Lamrani ==
- Wafaa Lamrani
- Mohammed Karim Lamrani
- Abdallah Lamrani
- Lee Brahim Murray-Lamrani
