= Aybars =

- Gender: Male

Origin
- Origin: Turkic
- Meaning: "gray or yellow/brown leopard" or "leopard of the moon"
- Region of origin: Turkish

Other names
- Related names: Oebarsius, Baybars, Barsbay

Aybars is a Turkish forename meaning either "gray/yellow leopard" or "leopard of the moon", related to Turkic mythology. The stem of the name comes from "ay" ('moon' in Turkic) and "bars" ('leopard' in Turkic). However, according to Pritsak and Nişanyan, the first word is "oy" rather than "ay", which means 'gray' or 'yellow' or 'brown', hence the meaning of the name is 'yellow/gray/brown leopard', referencing to lion.

Notable people with the name include:

== Given name ==
- Aybars Garhan (born 1991), Turkish footballer

== Surname ==
- Ateşan Aybars (born 1949), Turkish economist and TV celebrity
- Feridun Aybars (born 1952), Turkish swimmer
