= Breno =

Breno may refer to:

== People ==
- Breno Borges, Brazilian football player
- Breno Cezar (born 1995), Brazilian football player
- Breno Coelho, Brazilian photographer/cinematographer
- Breno Correia (born 1999), Brazilian swimmer
- Breno Giacomini (born 1985), American American football player
- Breno Lopes (footballer, born 1990), Brazilian football leftback
- Breno Lopes (footballer, born 1996), Brazilian football forward
- Breno Lorran, Brazilian football player
- Breno Macedo (born 1993), Brazilian politician
- Breno Matosinhos (born 1991), Brazilian football player
- Breno Mello (1931–2008), Brazilian athlete and actor
- Breno Silva (born 1986), Brazilian football player
- Breno Alencar Bianco, pen name of Júlio César de Mello e Souza (1895-1974), Brazilian writer and mathematics professor
- Phil Breno (born 1995), American football player
- Breno (footballer, born 2000), Brazilian footballer
- Breno (footballer, born 2003), Brazilian football midfielder
- Breno (footballer, born 2008), Breno de Moraes Souza, Brazilian football centre-back for Red Bull Bragantino

== Places ==
- Breno, Lombardy, Italy
- Breno, Ticino, Switzerland

== See also ==
- Brno, Czech Republic
