= Bobylev =

Bobylev (Russian: Бобылёв) and Bobyleva (Russian: Бобылёва) are masculine and feminine forms of a common Russian surname. Notable people with the surname include:

- Ivan Bobylev (b. 1991), a Russian football player.
- Leonid Bobylev (b. 1949), a Russian composer.
- Maksim Bobylev (b. 1992), a Russian football player.
- Vladimir Bobylev (b. 1997), a Russian professional ice hockey player.
