= Halar =

- Historical region
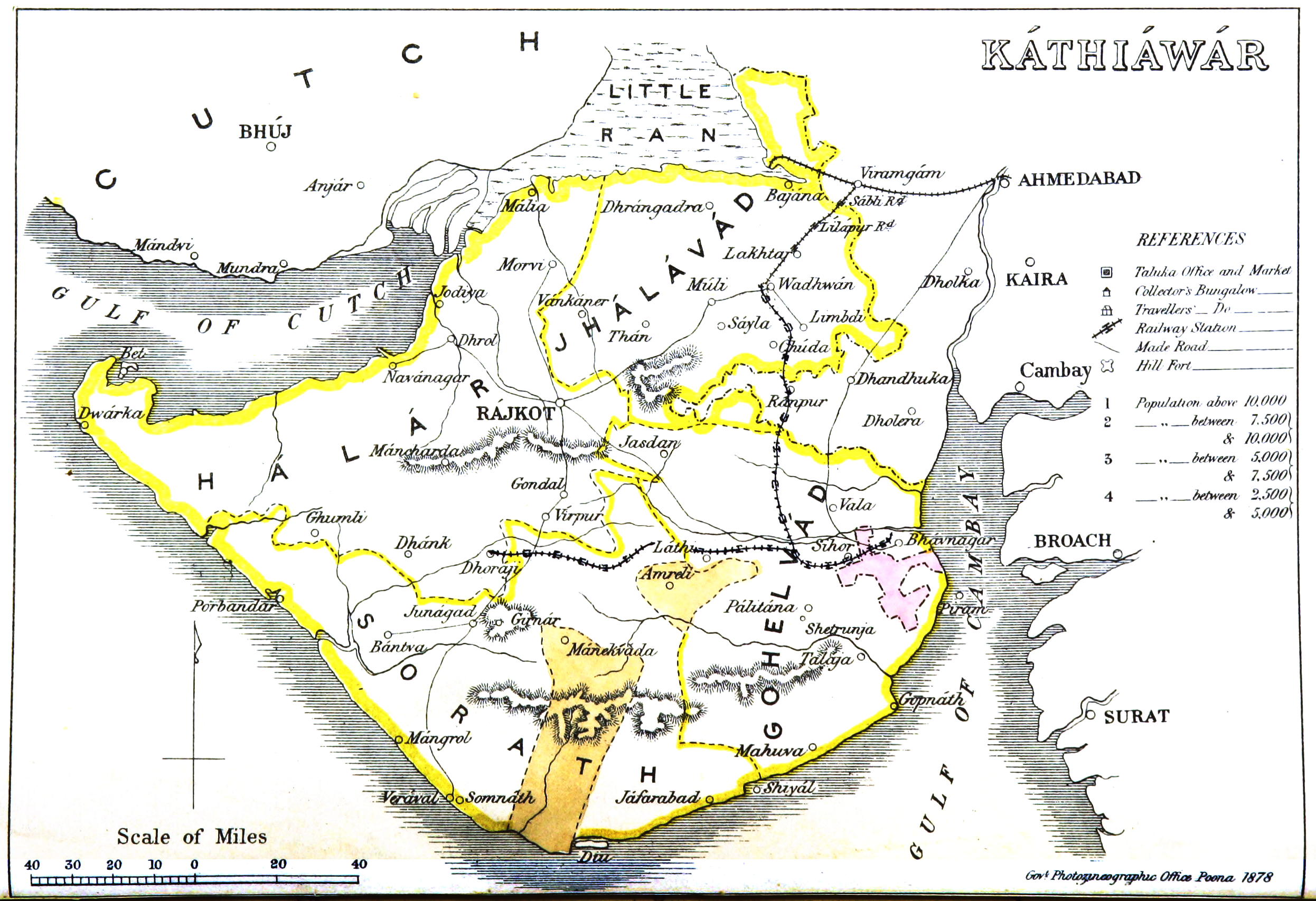
- 1855 map of Kathiawar
- Coordinates: 22°47′N 70°05′E
- Country: India
- State: Gujarat
- Named after: Hala branch of Jadeja Rajputs.

Area
  - Total: 19,365 km^{2} (7,477 sq mi)

Population (1901)
  - Total: 764,992
  - Density: 39.504/km^{2} (102.31/sq mi)

Languages
  - Official: Gujarati
- Time zone: UTC+5:30 (IST)
- Vehicle registration: GJ
- Website: gujaratindia.com

Halar (Haalaar) is a historical region of western India, located by the Gulf of Kutch coast on the northwestern area of Nawanagar, now Jamnagar, in Gujarat State, on Saurashtra peninsula, roughly corresponding to the present Jamnagar District, Devbhumi Dwarka district, Morbi District and Rajkot District.

In 1901 it had an area of 19,365 km^{2} and a population of 764,992 inhabitants.

== History ==
The name is derived from Jam Sri Halaji Jadeja who is supposed to be the 9th-generation grandfather of Jam Sri Rawalji Lakhaji Jadeja (who is the founder of the region and the first king to reign in the region); Halar was first established with this name by Jam Shri Rawalji Lakhaji, a Jadeja Rajput, in 1540.

During the British Raj Halar region was the western of the four prants or historical districts of Kathiawar, belonging to the Bombay Presidency, the others being Gohelwar (southeast), Jhalawar prant(north) and Sorath (southwest).

== Princely States in Halar region ==
At that time the region included numerous princely states belonging to the Kathiawar Agency, mostly ruled by Jadeja Rajputs.

Its salute states were :

- First Class states :
  - Nawanagar, title Maharaja Jam Sahib, Hereditary salute of 15-guns (19-guns locally)
  - Gondal, title Maharaja, Hereditary salute of 11-guns
  - Morvi, title Maharaja, Hereditary salute of 11-guns
- Second Class states :
  - Dhrol, title Thakore Sahib, Hereditary salute of 9-guns
  - Rajkot, title Thakore Sahib, Hereditary salute of 9-guns

Its major non-salute states (mostly minor, usually several village) included :

- Fourth Class states : Kotda Sangani, Malia, Virpur
- Fifth Class states : Gavridad, Jalia Devani, Kotharia, Rajpara, Mengni, Pal
- Sixth Class states : Bhadva.
- Seventh Class states : Khirasra, Lodhika

Other non-salute state, granted no class, were :

- multiple villages, yet mostly minor except the first : DHRAFA State (known as DHRAFA 24C, means 24 villages under Dhrafa's rule) Amran, Kanpar Ishwaria, Mulila Deri, Satodad Vavdi, Sisang Chandli,
- single village, petty states : Bhalgam Baldhoi, Kansiali, Kotda Nayani, Makaji Meghpar, Virvao.

== Bibliography ==
- Târikh-i-Soraṭh: A History of the Provinces of Soraṭh and Hâlâr. 1882.

== See also ==
- Kathiawar Peninsula
- Ranchhodji Diwan
- Lists of princely states of India
