= 1909–10 Fenerbahçe S.K. season =

Fenerbahçe
1909–10 season
- President: (Ottoman Empire) Tevfik Haccar
- Manager: (Ottoman Empire) Hüseyin Dalaklı
- Stadium: Union Club Field
- Istanbul Football League: 5th
Home colours

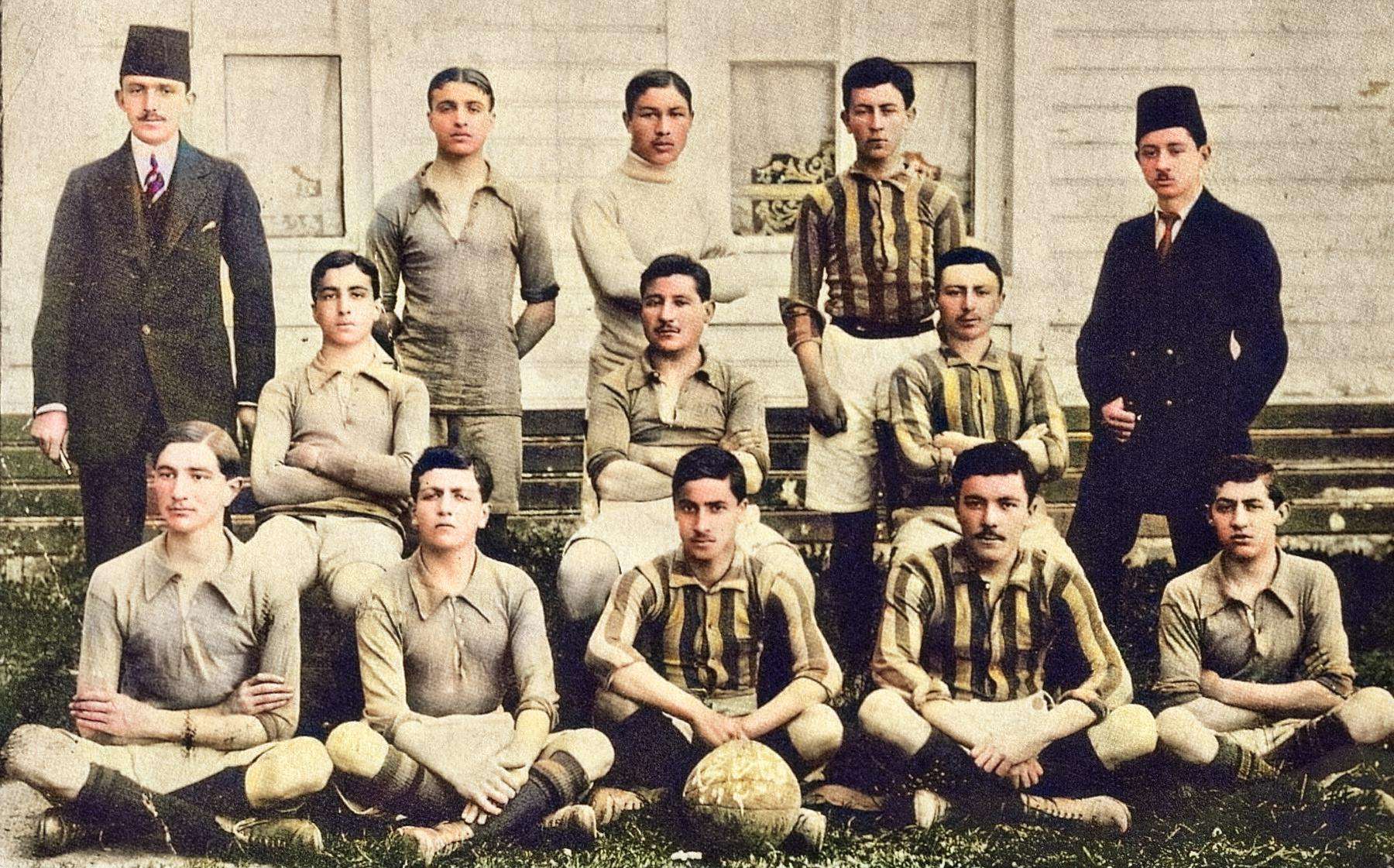

The 1909-1910 season was the fourth season for Fenerbahçe. This season is the club's second season in the Istanbul Football League.

== Team squad ==
Note: Flags indicate national team as defined under FIFA eligibility rules; some limited exceptions apply. Players may hold more than one non-FIFA nationality.

No.	Pos.	Nation	Player
1	GK	Ottoman Empire	Nuri
—		Ottoman Empire	Galip (captain)
—		Ottoman Empire	Hasan Sami
—		Ottoman Empire	Mazhar
—		Ottoman Empire	Fethi
—		Ottoman Empire	Nevzat
—		Ottoman Empire	Hasan
—		Ottoman Empire	Hüseyin
—	FW	ENG	Horace Armitage
—		Ottoman Empire	Sabri

No.	Pos.	Nation	Player
—		Ottoman Empire	Yahya Berki
—		Ottoman Empire	Memiş
—		Ottoman Empire	Hüseyin
—	MF	SUI	Gustave Haenni
—		Ottoman Empire	Nasuhi
—		Ottoman Empire	Şefkati Hulusi
—	MF	Ottoman Empire	Kamil
—	FW	Ottoman Empire	Tevfik Haccar
—		Ottoman Empire	Hayri
