= Hayri =

Hayri is a Turkish masculine given name. It is of Arabic origin and refers to "holy, auspicious, and something related to goodness and charity."

Notable people with the name include:

== First name ==
- Hayri Arsebük (1915–1943), Turkish basketball player
- Hayri Kıvrıkoğlu (born 1948), Turkish army commander
- Hayri Kozakçıoğlu (1938–2013), Turkish civil servant and politician
- Hayri Pinarci (born 1991), Dutch-Turkish football player
- Hayri Polat (1948–2013), Turkish wrestler
- Hayri Sevimli (born 1991), German-Turkish football player
- Hayri Sezgin (1961–2013), Turkish wrestler
- Hayri Terzioğlu (1908–1976), Turkish industrialist, journalist and politician
- Hayri Ündül (1929–2014), Turkish military officer

== Middle name ==
- Hasan Hayri Tan (1880–1942), Turkish politician and jurist
- Mehmet Hayri Bey (1879–1928?), Turkish officer of both the Ottoman and Turkish Army
- Mehmet Hayri Tarhan (1884–1934), Turkish military officer
- Suat Hayri Ürgüplü (1903–1981), Turkish politician
