= Gröger =

Gröger is a German language surname originally frequent in Prussian and Austrian Silesia. It stems from a reduced form of the male given name Gregory – and may refer to:

- Frieder Gröger (1934–2018), German mycologist
- Friedrich Carl Gröger (1766–1838), north-German portrait painter and lithographer
- Karl Gröger (1918–1943), Austrian member of a Dutch resistance group
- Eduard Gröger (1827-1907), Austrian-Czech politician
- Markus Gröger (1991), German footballer
