= Héctor Pérez =

Hector Perez may refer to:

- Héctor Pérez (baseball), Dominican baseball pitcher
- Hector Perez, National Commissioner of the Boy Scouts of America.
- Héctor Pérez (cyclist) (born 1959), Mexican cyclist
- Héctor Pérez, founder of the Spanish Internet Party political party
- Héctor Pérez, midfielder for the Venezuelan Atlético Venezuela soccer team, 2009
- Héctor Pérez, goalkeeper for the Brazilian Iberia Los Ángeles soccer team, 2011
- Héctor Pérez, cyclist representing Andorra at the 1988 Summer Olympics
- Héctor Amodio Pérez, Uruguayan guerrilla fighter
- Héctor Pérez (footballer, born 1991), Venezuelan football goalkeeper
- Héctor Rivera Pérez (born 1933), Auxiliary Bishop Emeritus of San Juan, 1979–2009
- Israel Héctor Perez (born 1979), featherweight boxer from Argentina
