= International Centre for Sports Studies =

Organization in Switzerland

The International Centre for Sports Studies, commonly known as the CIES (French: Centre International d'Etude du Sport), is an independent research and education centre located in Neuchâtel, Switzerland. It has a research group named the CIES Football Observatory that studies and researches the statistics of football.

== Origin ==
CIES was created in 1995 as a joint venture between FIFA, the University of Neuchâtel, and the City and State of Neuchâtel.

== Research ==
CIES Football Observatory mostly conducts research on the transfer values of players and team profiles.

== FIFA Master ==
FIFA Master
- International Master in Management, Law and Humanities of Sport
- Type: Private
- Established: 2000
- Affiliations: FIFA
- President: Pierre Cornu
- Director: Denis Oswald
- Students: 30–32
- Postgraduates: +/- 360
- Location: Leicester, England; Milan, Italy; Neuchâtel, Switzerland, Switzerland
- Website: Official Website

CIES organizes and offers a one-year postgraduate sports executive program, endorsed by FIFA, which consists of three modules that are taught across three universities in Europe, and concludes with a final project. The successful conclusion of the program merits the award of FIFA Master International in Management, Law and Humanities of Sport. It was created in 2000 to promote a managerial culture within the sports industry, with the aim to develop the skills of aspiring managers so that they can take on the complex challenges of this industry.

With around 20 nationalities represented in class each year, the FIFA Master provides an international and dynamic learning environment, and focuses on three major and interconnected subject fields: management (SDA Bocconi), law (Neuchâtel) and human sciences (De Montfort). The strengths of the FIFA Master in the key areas of graduate employability, alumni networks, quality of teaching and international appeal has seen the programme named as the top postgraduate sports management course in the world by SportBusiness International in their 2014 rankings. Established in 2000, the FIFA Master scooped the top global award at this year's ceremony, having previously been named as the leading course in Europe by the same rankings from 2012 to 2015. More than 500 international sport management courses and alumni submitted data to the 2014 rankings process.

The Master offers students the chance to meet with top international managers from the world of sport (e.g. clubs, federations, associations, etc.) and to be part of a network of highly relevant contacts. Graduates from the course become members of the FMA (the FIFA Master Alumni Association), which guarantees they will remain in touch with important stakeholders in sport.

=== De Montfort University ===
Humanities of Sport – The first term is taught at the International Centre for Sport History and Culture (ICSHC) at the De Montfort University, Leicester. The ICSHC was established in 1996 and is today widely acknowledged as the leading centre for the study of sports history in the world. The Humanities of Sport modules addresses the birth of modern sport, professionalisation and internationalisation of sport and sport ethics.

=== SDA Bocconi ===
Sport Management – The second term is taught at the SDA Bocconi School of Management, Milan, one of Europe's most prestigious business schools. This term addresses the area of Sports Management and covers topics such as finance, marketing, organization and governance, strategy, business planning, and event management, applied to the context of sport.

=== Université de Neuchâtel ===
Sport Law – The third and final term is taught at the Université de Neuchâtel, Neuchâtel, whose Law Faculty is one of the top law faculties in Switzerland. This term addresses the area of Sports Law and covers topics such as the legal aspects of the private sector of sport, the legal status of the sports person, legal aspects of sport and health, sport business and law, and methods of dispute resolution.

=== Final project ===
The Final Project of the FIFA Master in Management, Law, & Humanities of Sport is seen as an opportunity for postgraduates to conduct original research, demonstrate creativity and independent thinking, as well as to develop and defend their ideas. Working in small research teams, postgraduates develop an inter-disciplinary research project with reference to the course themes of Management, Law and the Humanities of Sport. The final work, which is expected to have an applicable nature to issues faced in world sport, is presented to a specially invited audience of industry and academic experts during a special conference event in Neuchâtel. Previous Final Projects have been implemented directly by sports organizations or by course Alumni in the sports industry.

CIES' postgraduates are examined throughout the FIFA Master in Management, Law, & Humanities of Sport by a variety of assessment methods. These include group assessments, written examinations, oral examinations and research papers. The assessment timetable is devised by each of the three partner universities.

=== Course patrons ===
Every year, the FIFA Master class is supported by a globally recognised patron who has made a contribution to sport.

2000/2001 (1st Edition) – Abedi Pele
2001/2002 (2nd Edition) – Anita DeFrantz
2002/2003 (3rd Edition) – Michel Platini
2003/2004 (4th Edition) – Sergey Bubka
2004/2005 (5th Edition) – Alexander Popov
2005/2006 (6th Edition) – Bobby Charlton
2006/2007 (7th Edition) – Sebastian Coe
2007/2008 (8th Edition) – Sepp Blatter
2008/2009 (9th Edition) – Nawal El Moutawakel
2009/2010 (10th Edition) – George Weah
2010/2011 (11th Edition) – Jérôme Valcke
2011/2012 (12th Edition) – Jonathan Edwards
2012/2013 (13th Edition) – Steffi Jones
2013/2014 (14th Edition) – Christian Karembeu
2014/2015 (15th Edition) – Jean-Christophe Rolland
2015/2016 (16th Edition) – Fatma Samoura
2016/2017 (17th Edition) – Zvonimir Boban
2017/2018 (18th Edition) – Francois Pienaar
2018/2019 (19th Edition) – Leonardo Araújo
2019/2020 (20th Edition) – Arsène Wenger
2020/2021 (21st Edition) – Fatma Samoura
2021/2022 (22nd Edition) – Emma Twigg (15th Edition alumnus)
2022/2023 (23rd Edition) – Gilberto Silva

=== FIFA Master alumni ===
- Samson Adamu – (Confederation of African Football, Acting General Secretary appointed in March 2026, formerly CAF Director of Tournaments and events)
- Taufique Ahmed – (Saudi Professional League, Project Manager – International Relations)
- Musa Amadu – (Nigeria Football Federation, General Secretary)
- Caroline Anderson – (TSE Consulting, Director & Partner)
- Anja Berninger – (NADA, acting CEO)
- Jair Bertoni – (FIFA, Director Member Associations)
- Hannah Burns – (International Olympic Committee, Head of Games Promotion)
- Dariel Collazo – (Puerto Rican Football Federation, acting General Secretary)
- Alberto Colombo – (EPFL, Head of Marketing & Communications)
- Marcelo Cordeiro – (IMG, Director Licensing)
- Robert Cormack – (Under Armour, Football Merchandising Manager)
- Miguel Angel Couchonnal – (Atlante Fútbol Club, executive director)
- Lauren Decker – (Creative Artists Agency, Executive - Sports Brand Consulting)
- Ratu Tisha Destria – (Football Association of Indonesia, Vice President)
- Pierre Ducrey – (IOC, Head of Games Delivery)
- Diederik Dewaele – (ECA, Director of Football)
- Hicham El Amrani – (CAF, Former General Secretary)
- Rob Esteva – (The Stats Zone, Founder & Director)
- Michael Gandler – (Inter Milan, Chief Revenue Officer)
- Ameline Gerbel – (AIBA, Sport Director)
- Michael Gerlinger – (FC Bayern Munich, Legal Director)
- Tim Goethals – (ASOIF, Head of Projects)
- Andres Ivan Gonzalez – (MasterCard, Head of Sponsorships, Asia/Pacific, MEA)
- Javier González Tupper – (Venezuelan international footballer)
- Sebastian Hassett – (Football Victoria, Head of Government Relations, Communications & Facilities)
- Nir Inbar – (Hapoel Tel Aviv FC, Director)
- Court Jeske – (United Soccer League, Executive Vice President)
- Jules César Kalisa – (Rwandese Association Football Federation, General Secretary)
- Angenie Kanhai – (Caribbean Football Union, General Secretary)
- Louis Kinziger – (San Fernando CD, President)
- James Kitching – (FIFA, Director of Football Regulatory)
- Rochak Langer – (Indian Super League)
- Carlos Lucas – (Portuguese Football Federation, Director of Competitions and Events)
- Kenneth Makhanya – (Mamelodi Sundowns, General Manager)
- Arnaud Le Mintier – (FIFA, Head of Broadcaster Servicing)
- Tsuneyasu Miyamoto – (Japanese international footballer)
- Ibrahim Y. Mohtaseb – (Sela Sport, Chief Business Development Officer)
- Ami Ōtaki – (Japanese international footballer)
- Park Ji-sung – (South Korean international footballer)
- Alessandro Pellicciotta – (CIES, Head of CIES Marketing & Development)
- Betsy Pollard-Maxfield – (Sporting Kansas City, Director, Youth Soccer)
- Angelo Rigopoulos – (UEFA, Managing Director Integrity & Regulatory)
- Leonardo Rossi – (AS Roma, Stadium Head of Ticket Sales)
- Francesca Sanzone – (FIGC, Deputy CEO)
- Jacqui Shipanga – (NFA, Head of Women's Football Department)
- Pascal Sommerhalder – (Infront Sports & Media, Associate Director Marketing & Sales)
- David Tang – (City Football Group, Managing Director - China)
- Michael Tattersall – (The Football League, Deputy Operations Director)
- Pedro Trengrouse – (Trengrouse & Gonçalves Advogados, Founding Partner)
- David Turner-Kerr – (JPMorgan Chase, Vice President – Sales)
- Duncan Tweed – (Athletics NSW, CEO)
- Emma Twigg – (New Zealand Olympic Gold Medalist rower)
- Gustavo Vieira – (FFEES, executive director)
- Mohsen Gilani – (Pakistan Football Federation – President)

== See also ==
- Advanced statistics in basketball
- Analytics (ice hockey)
- Sabermetrics
