= Antonio Franco =

Antonio Franco may refer to:

- Antonio Franco (blessed) (1585–1626), Italian Roman Catholic priest and prelate
- Antonio Franco (footballer, 1911–1996), Spanish football midfielder and manager
- Antonio Franco (diplomat) (1937–2026), Italian Roman Catholic prelate and Vatican diplomat
- António de Sousa Franco (1942–2004), Portuguese economist and politician
- Antonio Franco (journalist) (1947–2021), Spanish journalist
- Antonio Franco (footballer, born 1991), Paraguayan football goalkeeper
