= Amran =

Amran may refer to:

- 'Amran Governorate, Yemen
- 'Amran (Arabic: عمران) small city in western central Yemen, capital of the 'Amran Governorate
- Amran, Gujarat, a village in Jamnagar district, Gujarat, India
- Amran District, Yemen

== People with the name ==
- Ahmad Amran
- Edmond Amran El Maleh
- Amran Abdul Ghani
- Khwaja Amran

== See also ==
- Amram, father of Moses and Aaron
