= 1. Wiener Neustädter SC =

Association football club in Austria

Wiener Neustadt
- Full name: 1. Wiener Neustädter Sportclub
- Founded: 2008; 18 years ago
- Ground: Wiener Neustadt Arena, Wiener Neustadt
- Capacity: 4,000
- Manager: Robert Weinstabl
- League: 1. Landesliga
- 2024–25: 1. Landesliga, 3rd of 16
- Website: wnsc.at
Home colours	Away colours

1. Wiener Neustädter Sportclub is an Austrian football club based in the city of Wiener Neustadt.

== History ==
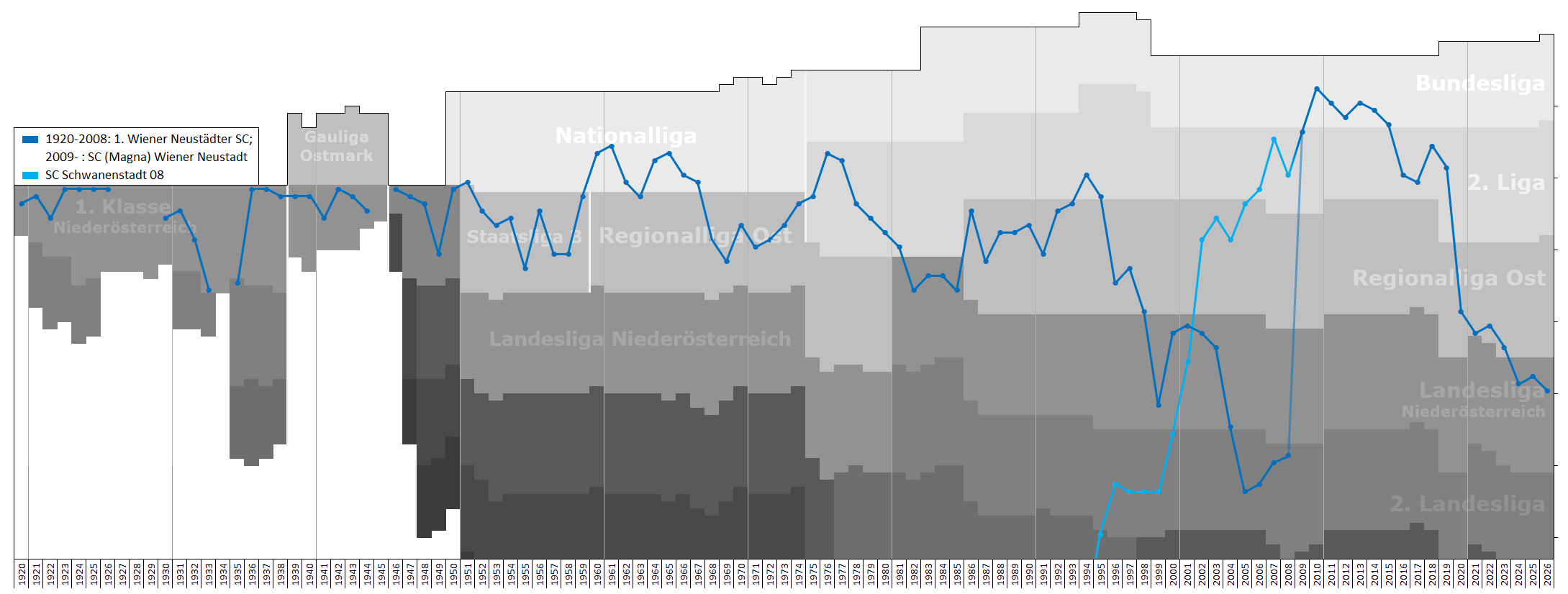
Historical chart of SC Wiener Neustadt league performance

FC Magna Wiener Neustadt obtained the right to play in the First League due to the collapse of SC Schwanenstadt caused by financial problems. SC Schwanenstadt's playing licence was taken over by Magna, who took their place in the First League. On 19 May, Austrian-Canadian business man Frank Stronach, the founder of Magna International, was elected president of the club.

The club played its first ever league game on 12 July 2008 against relegated side FC Wacker Innsbruck and lost 0–3. The remaining season was a lot more successful, culminating in the Austrian First League championship and promotion to the Austrian Bundesliga.

In late 2008 1. Wiener Neustädter SC decided to merge with FC Magna. In order to acknowledge the past of 1. SC, FC Magna was renamed SC Magna Wiener Neustadt, effective from 1 July 2009. In 2010 Magna decided to cooperate with SK Sturm Graz.

== Current squad ==
As of 1 July 2023

Note: Flags indicate national team as defined under FIFA eligibility rules; some limited exceptions apply. Players may hold more than one non-FIFA nationality.

No.	Pos.	Nation	Player
1	GK	AUT	Manuel Kassal
3	DF	AUT	Mario Postl
6	MF	AUT	Manuel Haidner
7	MF	AUT	Marco Meitz
8	MF	AUT	Matthias Binder
10	FW	AUT	Maximilian Sax
11	MF	AUT	Timo Etlinger
12	FW	AUT	Christopher Tvrdy
15	DF	AUT	Nenad Vasiljevic
17	MF	AUT	Pascal Fischer
19	MF	CRO	Tomislav Dramac
20	FW	AUT	Philipp Reinisch

No.	Pos.	Nation	Player
21	DF	AUT	Eray Mehmedali
22	DF	AUT	Philipp Eichberger
23	MF	AUT	Luka Jokanovic
24	GK	AUT	Dominik Hemmelmayer
30	DF	AUT	Bernhard Janeczek
31	DF	AUT	Thomas Weber
40	MF	AUT	Fatlum Kreka
—	GK	AUT	Dominik Schneidhofer
—	MF	AUT	Philipp Brandecker
—	MF	AUT	Benedikt Scherleitner
—	MF	AUT	Philipp Graf

== Former players ==
- (Austria) Peter Wurz

== Manager history ==
As of 28 January 2021

- (Austria) Helmut Kraft (2008–2009)
- (Austria) Peter Schöttel (2009–2011)
- (Austria) Peter Stöger (2011–2012)
- (Austria) Heimo Pfeifenberger (2012–2014)
- (Iceland) Helgi Kolviðsson (2014–2015)
- (Austria) Günter Kreissl (2015–2016)
- (Czech Republic) René Wagner (2016–2017)
- (Austria) Roman Mählich (2017–2018)
- (Austria) Gerhard Fellner (2018–2019)
- (Austria) Sargon Duran (2019 caretaker)
- (Austria) Thomas Flögl (2019–2020)
- (Austria) Jürgen Burgemeister (2020–2021)
- (Austria) Oliver Oberhammer (2021)
- (Austria) Zeljko Ristic (2021–)
