= Samson Adamu =

Nigerian football administrator

Samson Adamu is a Nigerian football administrator who serves as Acting General Secretary of the Confederation of African Football (CAF). He was appointed to the role in March 2026 following the resignation of Veron Mosengo-Omba, stepping in on an interim basis during a period of leadership transition within the organisation.

== Early life and education ==
Adamu studied Business Management and Computer Science at the American University of Paris. He later completed the FIFA Master in 2009, a postgraduate programme in sport management, law and humanities organised by the International Centre for Sports Studies and delivered across universities in Europe

=== Career ===
==== Early career ====
Adamu began his professional career at Kinetic Sport Management, where he worked for several years. During this period, he was involved in the organisation and development of Copa Lagos, an international beach soccer tournament held in Nigeria.

== Confederation of African Football ==
Adamu later joined the Confederation of African Football (CAF), where he held roles in competition management. He served as Director of Competitions, overseeing the coordination and organisation of CAF tournaments.

In March 2026, he was appointed Acting General Secretary of CAF. In this capacity, he is responsible for the administration of the organisation's secretariat and coordination with member associations and international governing bodies, including FIFA.

== Personal life ==
Adamu is the son of Amos Adamu, a Nigerian sports administrator and former member of the FIFA Executive Committee.
