= Thomas Weber (footballer) =

Austrian footballer

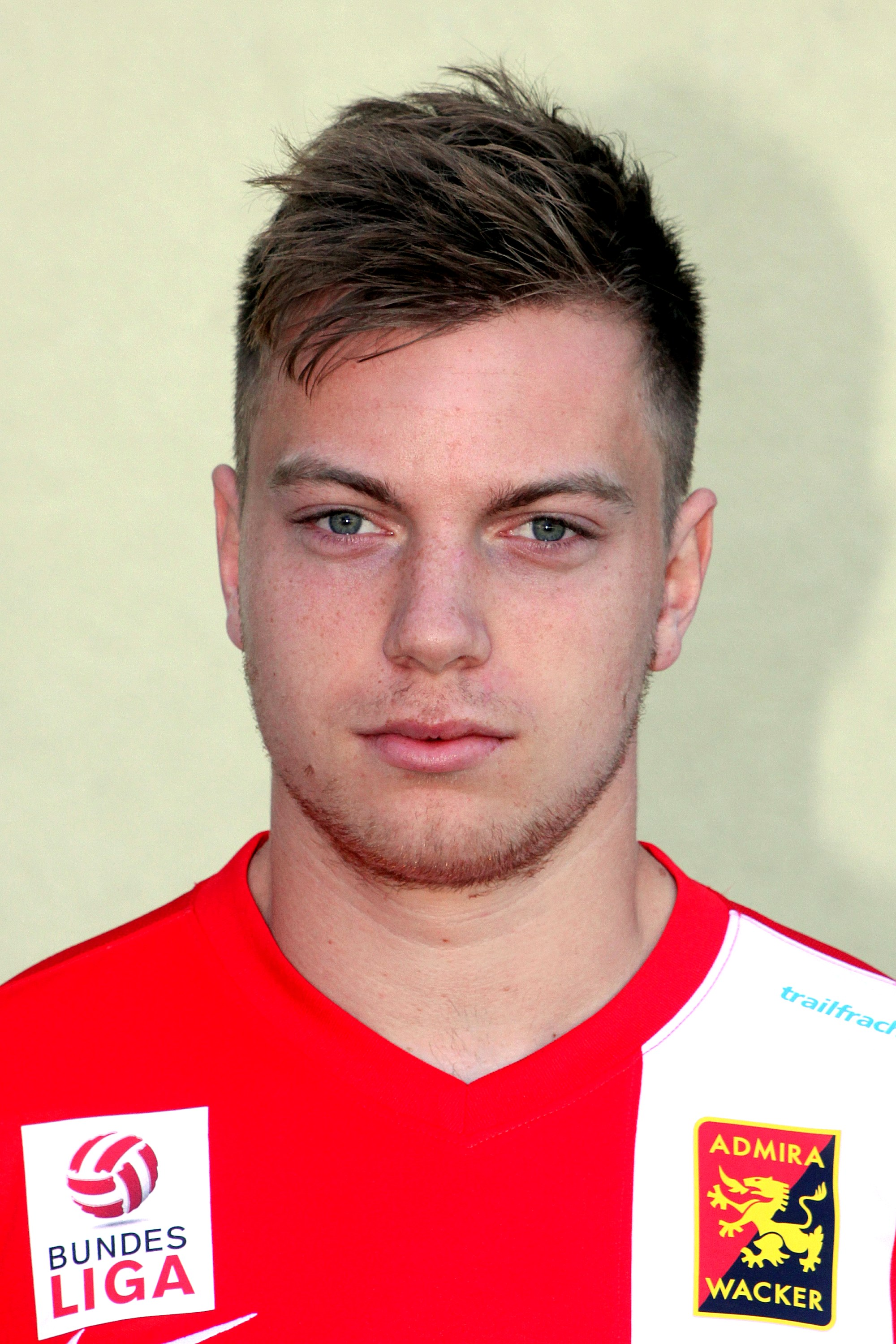

Personal information
- Full name: Thomas Edwin Lingon Sylt Weber
- Date of birth: 29 May 1993 (age 33)
- Place of birth: Vienna, Austria
- Height: 1.71 m (5 ft 7 in)
- Position: Full-back

Team information
- Current team: Wiener Neustadt
- Number: 31

Youth career
- 1998–2001: ASK Erlaa
- 2001–2011: Admira Wacker

Senior career*
Years	Team	Apps	(Gls)
2011–2012	Admira Wacker II	47	(4)
2012–2016	Admira Wacker	48	(1)
2015–2016	→ FAC (loan)	15	(0)
2017–2022	SV Stripfing	82	(5)
2022–2023	SC-ESV Parndorf 1919	10	(0)
2023–	Wiener Neustadt	7	(0)

International career
2012	Austria U-21	4	(0)
- * Club domestic league appearances and goals as of 10 November 2023

Thomas Weber (born 29 May 1993) is an Austrian footballer who plays for Wiener Neustadt.

== Club statistics ==
Club	Season	League		Cup		League Cup		Europe		Total	
Club	Season	Apps	Goals	Apps	Goals	Apps	Goals	Apps	Goals	Apps	Goals
Admira Wacker
Admira Wacker	2011–12	2	0	0	0	0	0	0	0	2	0
Admira Wacker	2012–13	9	0	1	0	0	0	3	0	13	0
Admira Wacker	2013–14	21	0	2	0	0	0	0	0	23	0
Admira Wacker	Total	32	0	3	0	0	0	3	0	38	0
Career Total		32	0	3	0	0	0	3	0	28	0

Updated to games played as of 16 June 2014.
