= Jucélio =

São Toméan footballer

Personal information
- Full name: Jucélio Ferreira Jorgino
- Date of birth: 14 November 1991 (age 34)
- Place of birth: Água Grande, São Tomé and Príncipe
- Height: 1.83 m (6 ft 0 in)
- Position: Midfielder

Team information
- Current team: Sofia Farmer

Youth career
- 2006–2010: Arrentela

Senior career*
| Years | Team | Apps | (Gls) |
| 2010 | Tondela | 0 | (0) |
| 2011 | Arrentela | | |
| 2011–2012 | Oeiras | 4 | (0) |
| 2012–2013 | Paio Pires | 25 | (1) |
| 2013–2015 | Eléctrico | 29 | (0) |
| 2015–2016 | Águias Moradal | 27 | (0) |
| 2016– | Sofia Farmer | 0 | (0) |

International career^{‡}
| 2016– | São Tomé and Príncipe | 2 | (0) |
- * Club domestic league appearances and goals ‡ National team caps and goals as of 4 June 2016

Jucélio Ferreira Jorgino (born 14 November 1991), simply known as Jucélio, is a São Toméan footballer who plays as a central midfielder for Northern Irish club Sofia Farmer and the São Tomé and Príncipe national team. He also holds Portuguese citizenship.

== International career ==
Jucélio made his international debut on 4 June 2016, when he entered as an 81st-minute substitute in a loss Africa Cup of Nations qualifier against Cape Verde.

He received his first selection with the Sao Tome and Principe team on June 4, 2016, against Cape Verde (1-2 defeat). This is a match that is part of the qualifications for the 2017 African Cup of Nations. Their second match, against Morocco, takes place three days later (0-2 defeat).
