= Virvao =

Human settlement in Gujarat, India

Virva(o) is a village and former Rajput non-salute princely state in Gujarat, western India.

== History ==
Virvao was a petty princely state comprising only the village, in the Halar prant of Kathiawar, ruled by Jadeja Rajput Chieftains.

It had a population of 193 in 1901, yielding a state revenue of 1,540 Rupees (1903–4, nearly all from land) and a paying a tribute of 193 Rupees, to the British and Junagadh State.

== External links and Sources ==
History

- Imperial Gazetteer, on dsal.uchicago.edu
