= Mulila Deri =

Human settlement in Gujarat, India

Mulila Deri (or Mulia Deri or Muliaderi) is a town and former Rajput non-salute princely state in Gujarat, western India.

== History ==
Mulila Deri was a minor princely state, also comprising six other villages, in the Halar prant of Kathiawar, ruled by Jadeja Rajput Chieftains.

It had a combined population of 2,350 in 1901, yielding a state revenue of 12,480 Rupees (1903–4, mostly from land) and a paying a tribute of 1,454 Rupees, to the British and Junagadh State.

== External links and Sources ==
History

- Imperial Gazetteer, on dsal.uchicago.edu
