= Baldhoi =

Village in Gujarat, India

Coordinates: 22°03′N 71°04′E

(Bhalgam) Baldhoi is a village and former non-salute princely state in Gujarat, western India.

== Village ==
Modern Baldhoi lies in Jasdan Taluka of Rajkot district, on Saurasthra peninsula.

It includes the site of a deserted village called Bhalgam close to the foot of the Baldhua hill.

== Etymology ==
There is a hill nearby known as the Baldhua hill. According to a legend, a laden bullock belonging to a Brinjari ascended this steep hill nearly 900 feet high, and died on the summit. A temple has been built on the spot and the hill was hereafter called Baldhua from baladh - a bullock. For the same reason the village is called Baldhoi.

== History ==
Bhalgam Baldhoi was a petty princely state, comprising solely the village, in the Halar prant of Kathiawar.

Bhalgam Baldhoi had a population of 617 in 1901, yielding a state revenue of 9,168 Rupees (1903–4, mostly from land) and a paying a tribute of 262 Rupees, to the British an Junagadh State.

It was held by Vala Kathi Chieftains, also during British period. It was subject to the Lodhika thana.

== External links and Sources ==
History

- Imperial Gazetteer, on dsal.uchicago.edu

This article incorporates text from a publication now in the public domain: Gazetteer of the Bombay Presidency: Kathiawar. Vol. VIII. Printed at the Government Central Press, Bombay. 1884. p. 374.
