= Kotda Nayani =

Village and state in India

Coordinates: 22.5349°N 70.8191°E

Kotda Nayani is a village and former non-salute princely state on Saurastra peninsula in Gujarat, Western India.

== History ==
Kotda Nayani was a small princely state and colonial thana, comprising only the village, in the Halar prant of Kathiawar, ruled by Jadeja Rajput Chieftains.

It had a population of 1,365 in 1901, yielding a state revenue of 16,135 Rupees (1903–4, mostly from land) and a paying a tribute of 347 Rupees, to the British and Junagadh State.

In 1943, with the implementation of the 'attachment scheme', when Kotda-Nayani thana, Hadala taluka and Mali(y)a state were merged into Morvi State, that thus enlarged its territory by an additional 310 km^{2} with about 12,500 inhabitants, and on 15 February 1948 merged into the United State of Kathiawar after the 1947 accession to India, which later merged into Gujarat.

== Sources and external links ==
- Imperial Gazetteer, on dsal.uchicago.edu
