= Michael La Rosa =

Belgian footballer

Personal information
- Full name: Michael La Rosa
- Date of birth: 10 April 1991 (age 35)
- Place of birth: Genk, Belgium
- Height: 1.78 m (5 ft 10 in)
- Position: Left winger

Youth career
- Genk
- Patro Eisden

Senior career*
Years	Team	Apps	(Gls)
2010–2014	MVV	67	(8)
2014–2015	Eisden	13	(0)
2015–2016	Spouwen-Mopertingen		
- * Club domestic league appearances and goals

Michael La Rosa (born 10 April 1991) is a Belgian former professional footballer who played as a left winger.
