= Mohamed Aleem =

Sri Lankan international footballer

Personal information
- Full name: Abdul Latheeb Mohamed Aleem
- Date of birth: 10 August 1991 (age 35)
- Place of birth: Sri Lanka
- Position: Midfielder

Team information
- Current team: Renown

Senior career*
Years	Team	Apps	(Gls)
2011–2013	Java Lane		
2013–	Renown		

International career
2013	Sri Lanka	1	(0)
- * Club domestic league appearances and goals

Abdul Latheeb Mohamed Aleem (born 10 August 1991) is a Sri Lankan international footballer who plays as a midfielder for Sri Lankan club Renown.
