= Breno Coelho =

Brazilian photographer and cinematographer

- Born: November 7, 1980; Itambacuri, Minas Gerais, Brazil
- Occupation: Film director

Breno Coelho is a photographer/cinematographer from Vitoria, ES, Brazil. Born in Minas Gerais on November, 11th of 1980, starting from a passion for art, he purchased his first 35mm camera and began his studies in photography in 2000. Inspired by the work of Helmut Newton, David Lachapelle and Oliviero Toscani, he got involved in fashion and glamour photography.

Recently, he became interested in filmmaking, and has submitted a winning entry for Google and CNN's COP15 video contest on global warming for the 2009 UN Climate Change Conference in Copenhagen, where he participated in a debate about the global warming phenomenon on CNN. Currently Breno teaches photographic technique at Faculdade Estacio de Sa in Vitoria.

In September 2009, Breno's video entry for the Citizen Ambassador video-contest “What Should Be Done” was selected by a committee of the United Nations. He was then, entitled as one of the five first United Nations Citizen Ambassadors.

In an interview to UN Radio, Mr. Coelho explained that he had set out to film the opinions of many different kinds of people. His aim was to suggest in 3 minutes, in a clear and simple way, “the initiatives that should be taken to make the world a better place”. Some suggestions came from poor areas, where people expressed to world leaders their wish to be able to receive a good education and leave violent environments.

Breno's aim as a Citizen Ambassador is to keep on raising awareness on relevant issues such as the MDGs (United Nations Millennium Development Goals) among the people and the authorities throughout 2010.
