= Emiliano Tabone =

Argentine footballer

Emiliano Tabone (born January 8, 1991) is an Argentine footballer currently playing for Unión Temuco of the Primera B Chilena. He was born in Buenos Aires.

== Teams ==
- (Argentina) Independiente (Inferiors) 2008–2009
- (Argentina) Tigre (Inferiors) 2010
- (Chile) Unión Temuco 2011–present
