= Juan Falchi =

Uruguayan footballer (born 1991)

Personal information
- Full name: Juan Marcelo Falchi Berta
- Date of birth: 5 January 1991 (age 35)
- Place of birth: Montevideo, Uruguay
- Height: 1.81 m (5 ft 11 in)
- Position: Goalkeeper

Senior career*
Years	Team	Apps	(Gls)
2014–2015	Boston River	25	(0)
2015–2016	Canadian		
2016–2017	Rentistas	4	(0)
2017–2018	Miramar Misiones	1	(0)
2018	Rampla Juniors	0	(0)
- * Club domestic league appearances and goals as of 2 March 2019

Juan Marcelo Falchi Berta (born 5 January 1991) is a Uruguayan footballer who most recently played as a goalkeeper for Rampla Juniors in the Uruguayan Primera División.
