= Sandra Lindkvist =

Swedish footballer

Personal information
- Full name: Sandra Lindkvist
- Date of birth: 15 December 1991 (age 34)
- Place of birth: Sweden
- Height: 1.64 m (5 ft 5 in)
- Position: Defender

Senior career*
Years	Team	Apps	(Gls)
2013–2014	IF Brommapojkarna	25	(0)
2016–2017	Djurgårdens IF	10	(0)
2017–2018	AIK	37	(2)
2019	Växjö DFF	19	(0)
- * Club domestic league appearances and goals as of 20 May 2019

Sandra Lindkvist (born 15 December 1991) is a Swedish football defender who played for Växjö DFF in the Swedish Damallsvenskan. She has previously played for Swedish clubs IF Brommapojkarna, Djurgårdens IF, and AIK.
