= Sofia Farmer F.C. =

Association football club in Northern Ireland

Sofia Farmer
- Full name: Sofia Farmer Football Club
- Founded: 2012
- Ground: Mid-Ulster Sports Arena
- League: Ballymena & Provincial Football League

Sofia Farmer Football Club is an intermediate-level football club playing in the Premier division of the Ballymena & Provincial League in Northern Ireland. The club originally played at the Mid-Ulster Sports Arena, Cookstown, County Tyrone, before moving in 2016 to share Allen Park, Antrim, with Chimney Corner. The club plays in the Irish Cup.

During their first season as an intermediate club, 2015–16, the club struggled to make an impact in the Ballymena & Provincial League, drawing two and losing fifteen of their matches, with one match not played. The match in question, an away tie against Rathcoole, was abandoned in the second half after a mass brawl between players from both teams broke out. They suffered several heavy defeats, including losing 15–1 at Magherafelt Sky Blues, 15–0 at Ballynure Old Boys and 18–1 at Dunloy.
