= João Filipe Poceiro =

Swiss footballer (born 1991)

Personal information
- Full name: João Filipe Poceiro Lopes
- Date of birth: 9 November 1991 (age 34)
- Place of birth: Geneva, Switzerland
- Height: 1.83 m (6 ft 0 in)
- Position: Defender

Team information
- Current team: Lancy FC
- Number: 16

Youth career
- FC Rhexia-Vessy
- –2012: Servette

Senior career*
Years	Team	Apps	(Gls)
2011–2013	Servette	2	(0)
2011–2012	→ Étoile Carouge (loan)	14	(0)
2012–2013	→ Étoile Carouge (loan)	5	(1)
2013–2014	Nyon	16	(0)
2015–2018	FC Veyrier Sports	42	(4)
2018–	Lancy FC	38	(2)
- * Club domestic league appearances and goals as of 9 November 2019

João Filipe Poceiro Lopes (born 9 November 1991) is a Swiss footballer who plays for Lancy FC.
