= Ateşan Aybars =

Turkish economist (born 1949)

Ateşan Aybars (Turkish pronunciation: [aˈteʃan ajbaɾs]; born 4 September 1949) is a Turkish economist and TV celebrity, CTA and Biomedical Engineer.

== Education and career ==
He graduated from the Istanbul Technical University in 1973. After working as a Commodity trading advisor at the Ontario Securities Commission between 1985 and 1989 for 5 years, he finished his master thesis about the "Conductivity Effects of Temperature".

He worked for several newspapers as columnist and as a commentator economist for NTV. He is currently working for BloombergHT as commentator.

== Selected publications ==
=== Books ===
- Finansal Piyasalarda Zihin Kontrolü (2017)
- Meslek Olarak Opsiyon İşlemleri (2019)
- Karmaşıklık Ekonomisi (2021)

== Bibliography ==
- Richbars Technical Trader (1985)
- İMKB Uygulamalı Teknik Analiz (1992)
