= Iakob Apkhazava =

Georgian professional footballer

Personal information
- Date of birth: 30 April 1991 (age 35)
- Place of birth: Georgia
- Position: Forward

Senior career*
Years	Team	Apps	(Gls)
2009–2010	Lokomotivi Tbilisi	12	(0)
2010	Bogdanka Łęczna II	1	(0)
2012–2013	Kolkheti-1913 Poti	5	(0)
2013–2014	Cultural Leonesa	8	(0)
2015–2016	Slavia Mozyr	13	(0)
2016	Sioni Bolnisi	1	(0)
2020	Aragvi Dusheti	12	(1)
2021	FC Tbilisi City		
2022	Borjomi		
- * Club domestic league appearances and goals as of 30 April 2024

Iakob Apkhazava (Georgian: იაკობ აფხაზავა; born 30 April 1991) is a Georgian professional footballer who plays as a forward.
