= Michael Lucky Kelechuckwu =

Nigerian footballer

Personal information
- Date of birth: 1 January 1991 (age 35)
- Place of birth: Nigeria
- Position: Forward

Team information
- Current team: Chennai City FC

Senior career*
Years	Team	Apps	(Gls)
2015–16	F.C. Green Valley		
2016–17	Viva Chennai F.C.		
2017–	Chennai City FC	3	(0)
- * Club domestic league appearances and goals ‡ National team caps and goals as of 28 July 2011

Michael Lucky (born 1 January 1991) is a Nigerian footballer who plays as a forward for I-league club Chennai City FC.

== Career ==
Lucky was signed by I-League club Chennai City FC in 2017. He made his first appearance for the club against Indian Arrows in a 3–0 loss.
