= Marco Muraccini =

Sammarinese footballer

Personal information
- Date of birth: 25 February 1991 (age 35)
- Place of birth: San Marino
- Position: Midfielder

Senior career*
Years	Team	Apps	(Gls)
2012–2015	S.S. Folgore Falciano Calcio	52	(0)

International career^{‡}
2011–2012	San Marino U21	7	(0)
2012	San Marino	1	(0)
- * Club domestic league appearances and goals as of 18 July 2020 ‡ National team caps and goals as of 18 July 2020

Marco Muraccini (born 25 February 1991) is a former San Marino international footballer who played as a midfielder.

== International career ==
Muraccini won seven caps for San Marino at under-21 level. He made his senior debut on 14 August 2012, in a 3–2 defeat to Malta.
