= Adaon Kalalla =

Belgian footballer

Personal information
- Date of birth: 7 January 1991 (age 35)
- Place of birth: Kinshasa, Zaire
- Position: Striker

Youth career
- 2001–2006: R.U.S. Albert Schaerbeek
- 2006–2007: Anderlecht

Senior career*
Years	Team	Apps	(Gls)
2007–2009	Anderlecht	0	(0)
2009–2010	KSK Beveren	6	(0)
2010–2011	Othellos Athienou		

International career
2006	Belgium U-15	4	(1)
2006–2007	Belgium U-16	8	(0)
2009	Belgium U-18	3	(0)
2008	Congo DR U-19	3	(0)
- * Club domestic league appearances and goals as of 6 December 2015

Adaon Kalalla (born 7 January 1991 in Kinshasa, Zaire) is a Belgium footballer who last played for Othellos Athienou.

== Career ==
Kalala began his career with R.U.S. Albert Schaerbeek and joined R.S.C. Anderlecht in 2006. He was promoted to the senior team on 3 May 2007. He played his first game for R.S.C. Anderlecht on 2 May 2007. After three years left R.S.C. Anderlecht and signed on 4 August 2009 a two years contract for KSK Beveren.

== International ==
Kalala played for his homeland Congo DR national football team on Under 19 Level and was former member of the Under 15 team from Belgium.
