= Juan Carlos Lueiza =

Chilean footballer (born 1991)

Personal information
- Full name: Juan Carlos Lueiza Muñoz
- Date of birth: 13 August 1991 (age 35)
- Place of birth: El Salvador, Chile
- Height: 1.71 m (5 ft 7 in)
- Position: Central midfielder

Team information
- Current team: Provincial Talagante

Youth career
- Cobresal

Senior career*
Years	Team	Apps	(Gls)
2010–2011	Cobresal	12	(0)
2012–	Provincial Talagante	0	(0)
- * Club domestic league appearances and goals as of 3 March 2012

Juan Carlos Lueiza Muñoz (born 13 August 1991) is a Chilean footballer that currently plays for Chilean Primera División club Cobresal as central midfielder.
