= Gunel Mutallimova =

Azerbaijani footballer (born 1991)

Personal information
- Date of birth: 1 July 1991 (age 35)
- Position: Goalkeeper

International career^{‡}
Years	Team	Apps	(Gls)
2010	Azerbaijan	1	(0)
- ‡ National team caps and goals as of 23 June 2010

Gunel Mutallimova (Azerbaijani: Günel Mütəllimova; born 1 July 1991) is an Azerbaijani footballer who plays as a goalkeeper. She has been a member of the Azerbaijan women's national team.
