= Nicholas Killas =

South African soccer player

Personal information
- Date of birth: 8 February 1991 (age 35)
- Place of birth: Johannesburg, South Africa
- Position: Defender

Team information
- Current team: AEK Kouklia F.C.

Senior career*
Years	Team	Apps	(Gls)
2011–2012	Mpumalanga Black Aces F.C.	2	(0)

International career^{‡}
	Cyprus U21	3	(1)
- * Club domestic league appearances and goals as of 15 June 2013 ‡ National team caps and goals as of 15 June 2013

Nicholas Killas (born 8 February 1991) is a South African association football defender who plays for AEK Kouklia F.C. in the Cypriot First Division.
