= Damian Skołorzyński =

Polish footballer

Personal information
- Full name: Damian Skołorzyński
- Date of birth: 12 February 1991 (age 35)
- Place of birth: Węgorzewo, Poland
- Position: Defender

Team information
- Current team: Granica Kętrzyn

Youth career
- Mamry Giżycko
- 2008–2010: Wisła Kraków

Senior career*
Years	Team	Apps	(Gls)
2010–2011	Wisła Kraków (ME)	23	(0)
2011–2012	Wisła Kraków	1	(0)
2011–2012	→ Termalica Bruk-Bet (loan)	9	(0)
2012–2014	Termalica Bruk-Bet	4	(0)
2014	Płomień Ełk	25	(2)
2015–2016	Swaffham Town		
2016	Ashton United		
2016–2017	Mossley		
2017	Denton Town		
2017–2020	Winsford United		
2020	Wythenshawe Amateurs		
2020–2021	Manchester Polonia		
2021	Winsford United		
2021–2022	Manchester Polonia		
2022	Prestwich Heys		
2022–2023	Manchester Polonia		
2023	Winsford United		
2024–2025	Mamry Giżycko	37	(2)
2025–2026	Stomil Olsztyn	20	(0)
2026–	Granica Kętrzyn	0	(0)

International career
2009	Poland U18	1	(0)
- * Club domestic league appearances and goals as of 11:01, 11 July 2026 (UTC)

Damian Skołorzyński (born 12 February 1991) is a Polish professional footballer who plays as a defender for IV liga Warmia-Masuria club Granica Kętrzyn.

== Career ==
Skołorzyński made his debut for Wisła Kraków in Ekstraklasa on 25 May 2011 in a match against Zagłębie Lubin.

He later moved to the United Kingdom where he played for a number of clubs including Mossley.

== Honours ==
Wisła Kraków

- Ekstraklasa: 2010–11
