= Sèrge Brou =

Ivorian footballer

Personal information
- Full name: Kouadio Guy Sèrge Brou
- Date of birth: 2 June 1991 (age 35)
- Place of birth: Grand-Lahou, Ivory Coast
- Height: 1.73 m (5 ft 8 in)
- Position: Left winger

Team information
- Current team: Rabo de Peixe

Senior career*
Years	Team	Apps	(Gls)
2009–2013	USC Bassam		
2013–2015	Wydad de Fès		
2016	UD Oliveirense	13	(0)
2016–2017	Gil Vicente	14	(0)
2017	Fátima	13	(0)
2017–2018	Farense	4	(0)
2018–2019	1º Dezembro	20	(2)
2019–2020	Ideal	17	(4)
2020–	Rabo de Peixe	21	(1)
- * Club domestic league appearances and goals as of 22:09, 30 June 2021 (UTC)

Kouadio Guy Sèrge Brou (born 2 June 1991) is an Ivorian football player who plays for Rabo de Peixe.

== Club career ==
He made his professional debut in the Segunda Liga for UD Oliveirense on 23 January 2016 in a game against C.D. Santa Clara.

In 2020, Brou signed with Rabo de Peixe in the Campeonato de Portugal.
