= Yasin Öztop =

Turkish footballer

Personal information
- Full name: Yasin Öztop
- Date of birth: 25 May 1991 (age 35)
- Place of birth: Aybastı, Turkey
- Position: Defender

Team information
- Current team: Çankaya FK

Youth career
- 2005–2007: Kabataş Gençlikspor
- 2007–2009: Orduspor

Senior career*
Years	Team	Apps	(Gls)
2009–2014	Orduspor	2	(0)
2010	→ Gümüşhanespor (loan)	5	(0)
2010–2012	→ Kastamonuspor (loan)	54	(1)
2013	→ Ünyespor (loan)	15	(0)
2013–2014	→ Trabzon Kanuni (loan)	29	(1)
2014–2015	68 Yeni Aksarayspor	26	(0)
2015–2017	Orduspor	51	(2)
2017	Tekirdağspor	10	(0)
2018	Muğlaspor	13	(0)
2018–2019	Erbaaspor	9	(0)
2019–2020	52 Orduspor	25	(0)
2020–	Çankaya FK	0	(0)
- * Club domestic league appearances and goals as of 8 March 2020

Yasin Öztop (born 25 May 1991) is a Turkish footballer who plays for Çankaya FK. He made his Süper Lig debut on 28 October 2012.
