= Ahmad Amran =

Yemeni writer

Ahmed Amran is a Yemeni Hungarian writer. He has a PhD in Geophysicist. In 2000, he published a short story collection titled A New Horizon for a Newer World. A story from that book ("A Poet and a Dancer") was translated into Italian, and included in a 2009 anthology of Yemeni literature called Perle dello Yemen.

Ahmed Amran’s first short story collection, The Last Supper (name in Hungarian: Az utolsó ebéd), was published in Budapest in 2017. His second short story collection, titled The Steam of the Soul (name in Hungarian:A Lélek gőze), was published in 2019. The Arabic edition of *The Steam of the Soul* was published in Cairo in 2022. On the Day of Hungarian Culture in 2023, he was awarded the title of Knight of Universal Culture. In 2026, he received a literary award at the Szolnok Prima competition. The author is planning English and French editions of The Steam of the Soul.

Amran is living in Hungary.
