= Stéphane Okou =

Ivorian footballer

Stephane Okou
Personal information
- Full name: Stephane Okou
- Date of birth: January 1, 1991 (age 35)
- Position: Defender

Senior career*
Years	Team	Apps	(Gls)
- Africa Sports

International career^{‡}
2012–	Ivory Coast	1	(0)
- * Club domestic league appearances and goals ‡ National team caps and goals as of 29 January 2013

Stephane Okou is an Ivorian footballer who plays as a defender. He made his debut for Ivory Coast against Guinea in 2012.
