= Hasan Hayri Tan =

Turkish politician

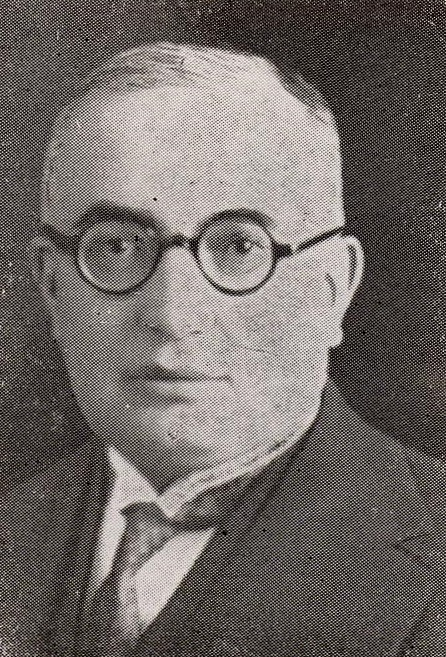

Member of the Grand National Assembly

Personal details
- Born: 1880 Constantinople, Ottoman Empire
- Died: 1942 (aged 61–62)

Hasan Hayri Tan (1880–1942) was a Turkish politician and jurist, who was the lawyer of certain CUP figureheads at the Armenian genocide trials.
