= Kenechuhwu Uchenwa =

Nigerian footballer

Uche
Personal information
- Full name: Kenechuhwu Uchenwa
- Date of birth: 3 June 1991 (age 35)
- Place of birth: Enugu, Nigeria
- Height: 1.88 m (6 ft 2 in)
- Position: Defensive midfielder

Team information
- Current team: Manchego

Youth career
- Mallorca

Senior career*
Years	Team	Apps	(Gls)
2010–2015	Mallorca B	61	(2)
2012	Mallorca	0	(0)
2015–2017	Cornellà	44	(1)
2017	Atlético Baleares	8	(0)
2018	Badalona	2	(0)
2018–2019	Arenas de Getxo	14	(1)
2019	Cornellà	4	(0)
2020–	Manchego	4	(0)
- * Club domestic league appearances and goals as of 20:09, 21 June 2020 (UTC)

Kenechuhwu Uchenwa // (born 3 June 1991), commonly known as Uche, is a Nigerian footballer who plays for Spanish club Silla CF. Mainly a defensive midfielder, he can also play as a central defender.

== Football career ==
Born in Enugu, Uche grew in the youth ranks of Spanish side RCD Mallorca, and made his senior debuts with the reserves in the 2010–11 season, in Segunda División B. On 19 January 2012, he damaged his anterior cruciate ligament, being sidelined for six months; in February he underwent surgery, only returning to the fields in October.

On 1 November, Uche made his official debut with the first team, starting in a 1–1 away draw against Deportivo de La Coruña for the season's Copa del Rey. However, he was replaced in the 13th minute, after suffering another knee injury, being sidelined for further six months.

On 3 July 2013, Uche signed a new three-year deal with the Balearics, being also promoted to the first team. He continued to appear with the B-side, however, and rescinded his contract on 27 August 2015.

On 12 January 2017, Uche moved to fellow third-tier club CD Atlético Baleares.
