= Toshiro Yatsuzuka =

Japanese association football player

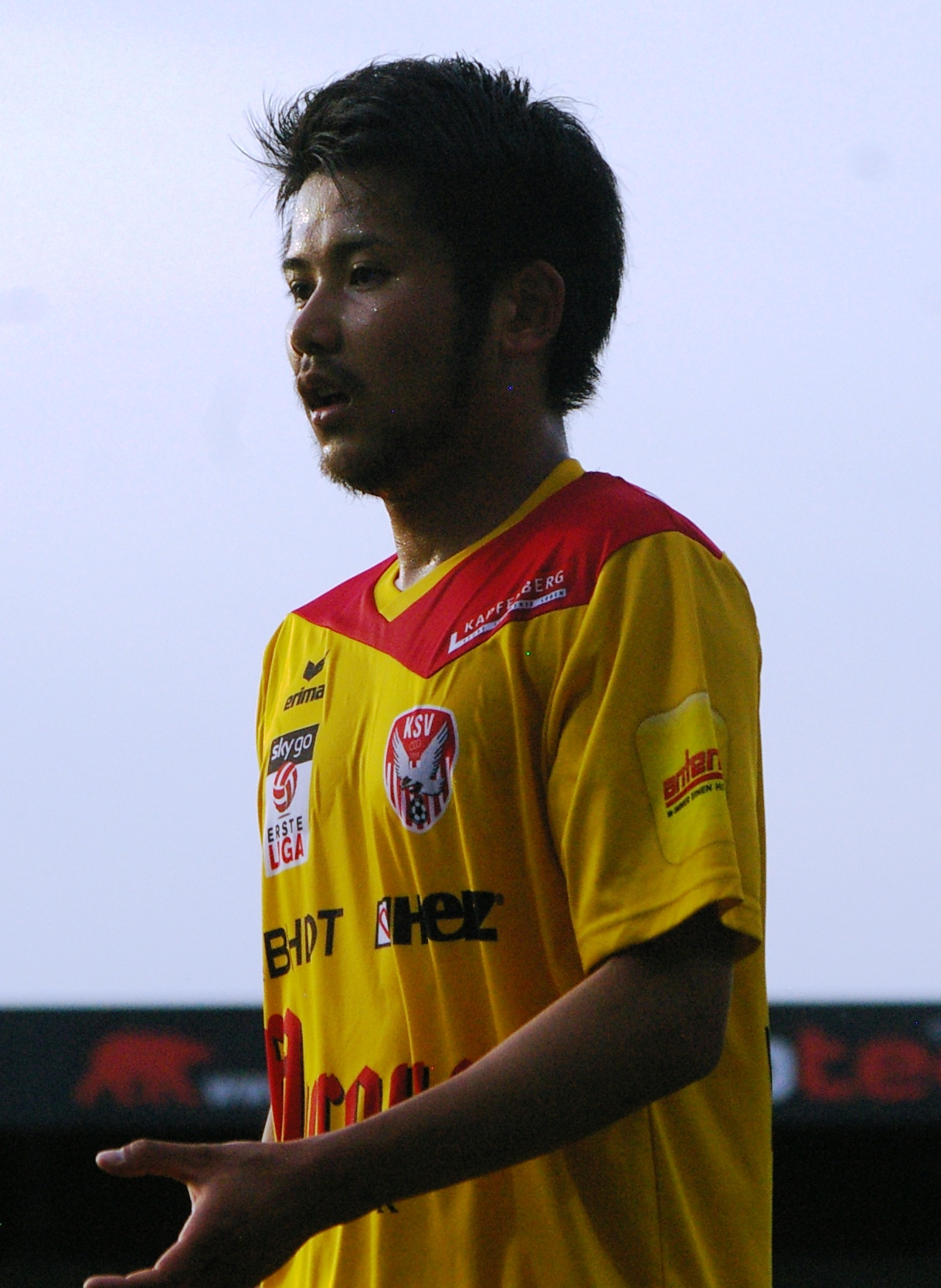
- Yatsuzuka playing for Kapfenberger

Personal information
- Date of birth: 4 September 1991 (age 35)
- Place of birth: Tama, Tokyo, Japan
- Height: 1.75 m (5 ft 9 in)
- Position: Defender

Youth career
- Toyoni USC
- 2008–2011: Tokyo Verdy
- 2011–2013: Meiji University

Senior career*
Years	Team	Apps	(Gls)
2014	Deutschlandsberger	15	(0)
2014–2016	Kapfenberger SV	44	(0)
2014–2015	Kapfenberger II	4	(0)
2016–2017	Ritzing	42	(3)
2017–2018	Tokyo Musashino City	4	(0)
Total		109	(3)
- * Club domestic league appearances and goals

Toshiro Yatsuzuka (八塚 利朗, Yatsuzuka Toshiro; born 4 September 1991) is a former Japanese footballer. He retired in 2018.

== Career statistics ==
=== Club ===
Club	Season	League			Cup		Other		Total	
Club	Season	Division	Apps	Goals	Apps	Goals	Apps	Goals	Apps	Goals
Deutschlandsberger	2013–14	Landesliga Steiermark	15	0	0	0	0	0	15	0
Kapfenberger SV	2014–15	Austrian First League	34	0	3 (Note: Appearances in the Austrian Cup)	0	0	0	37	0
Kapfenberger SV	2015–16	Austrian First League	10	0	2	0	0	0	12	0
Kapfenberger SV	Total		44	0	5	0	0	0	49	0
Kapfenberger II	2014–15	Landesliga Steiermark	1	0	0	0	0	0	1	0
Kapfenberger II	2015–16	Landesliga Steiermark	3	0	0	0	0	0	3	0
Kapfenberger II	Total		4	0	0	0	0	0	4	0
Ritzing	2015–16	Austrian Regionalliga	14	0	0	0	0	0	14	0
Ritzing	2016–17	Austrian Regionalliga	28	3	2	0	0	0	30	2
Ritzing	Total		42	3	2	0	0	0	44	0
Tokyo Musashino City	2017	JFL	4	0	0	0	0	0	4	0
Tokyo Musashino City	2018	JFL	0	0	0	0	0	0	0	0
Tokyo Musashino City	Total		4	0	0	0	0	0	4	0
Career total			109	3	7	0	0	0	116	3
