= Maxime Rousseau =

French footballer (born 1991)

Personal information
- Full name: Maxime Rousseau
- Date of birth: 19 August 1991 (age 35)
- Place of birth: Château-Gontier, France
- Height: 1.67 m (5 ft 6 in)
- Position: Midfielder

Team information
- Current team: ES Segré

Senior career*
Years	Team	Apps	(Gls)
2011–2014	Angers	21	(0)
2012–2013	Angers II	16	(0)
2013–2014	→ Le Poiré-sur-Vie II (loan)	5	(0)
2014–2015	Les Herbiers VF	19	(0)
2015–	ES Segré		
- * Club domestic league appearances and goals as of 21 July 2013

Maxime Rousseau (born 19 August 1991) is a French footballer who plays as a midfielder for Championnat National side Le Poiré-sur-Vie on loan from Angers SCO in Ligue 2.
