= Nevzat =

Nevzat is a Turkish unisex given name. The word was borrowed from Persian and its source word is nevzād. In Turkish it means "newborn child".

Notable people named Nevzat include:

== Male ==
- Nevzat Ayaz (1930–2020), Turkish civil servant and politician
- Nevzat Aydın (born 1976), Turkish businessman
- Nevzat Güzelırmak (1942–2020), Turkish football player
- Nevzat Halili (born 1946), Macedonian politician and teacher
- Nevzat Sayin (born 1954), Turkish architect
- Nevzat Soguk, Turkish professor of political science
- Nevzat Süer (1925–1987), Turkish chess player
- Nevzat Tandoğan (1894–1946), Turkish civil servant and politician
- Nevzat Tarhan (born 1952), Turkish medical scientist, psychiatrist and neuropsychology expert
- Nevzat Yalçıntaş (1933–2016), Turkish academic and politician

== Female ==
- Benal Nevzat Arıman (1903–1990), Turkish poet, writer and politician
- Nevzad Hanım (1902–1992), consort of Ottoman Sultan Mehmed VI
