= Irvin Museng =

Indonesian footballer

Personal information
- Full name: Irvin Museng
- Date of birth: 13 June 1991 (age 35)
- Place of birth: Makassar, Indonesia
- Height: 1.70 m (5 ft 7 in)
- Positions: Winger; striker

Youth career
- MFS FC
- Makassar Football School
- Ajax C2
- PSM U-21

Senior career*
Years	Team	Apps	(Gls)
2009–2010	Pro Duta FC	12	(1)
2010–2011	Medan Chiefs	15	(2)
2011–2012	Pro Duta FC	14	(1)
2012–2013	Persiba Balikpapan	5	(0)

International career
2005	Indonesia U-12		(10)
2008	Indonesia U-16	6	(10)
- * Club domestic league appearances and goals as of 19 September 2013

Irvin Museng (born 13 June 1991) is an Indonesian former footballer. He is the top scorer in 2005 Danone Nations Cup tournament in French.

== Achievement ==
- 2005 Danone Nations Cup top scorer with 10 goals

== Personal ==
His grandfather is Thauw Cin Sek, a famous retired soccer player.
