= Nkanyiso Madonsela =

South African soccer player

Personal information
- Date of birth: 20 March 1991 (age 35)
- Place of birth: Pietermaritzburg, South Africa
- Height: 1.78 m (5 ft 10 in)
- Positions: Left back; left winger

Team information
- Current team: Maritzburg United

Senior career*
Years	Team	Apps	(Gls)
2012–2014	Lamontville Golden Arrows	6	(0)
2014	Thanda Royal Zulu	7	(0)
2014–2017	Jomo Cosmos	54	(11)
2017–2020	Royal Eagles	16	(4)
2020	Uthongathi	8	(0)
2020–2023	Sekhukhune United	57	(1)
2024–	Maritzburg United	20	(0)
- * Club domestic league appearances and goals as of 20 March 2024

Nkanyiso Madonsela (born 20 March 1991) is a South African soccer player who plays as a left back/left winger for South African First Division club Maritzburg United.
