= Feridun Aybars =

Turkish swimmer (born 1952)

Personal information
- Nationality: Turkey
- Born: 30 March 1952 (age 74)
- Height: 190 cm (6 ft 3 in)
- Weight: 80 kg (176 lb)

Sport
- Sport: Swimming; Water polo
- Strokes: freestyle butterlfy

Feridun Aybars (born 30 March 1952) is a Turkish former swimmer and water polo player.

He was the national record holder in the 4×100 metres medley together with Feridun Deveci, Behçet Kurtiç and Uğur Çilingiroğlu.

He competed in two events at the 1972 Summer Olympics.

He was also a member of the Turkey men's national water polo team.
