= Malin Ahlberg =

Swedish footballer (born 1991)

Personal information
- Full name: Malin Ahlberg
- Date of birth: 3 August 1991 (age 35)
- Place of birth: Sweden
- Position: Forward

Senior career*
Years	Team	Apps	(Gls)
2011–2015	Mallbackens IF	83	(7)
- * Club domestic league appearances and goals as of 23:37, 22 May 2016 (UTC)

Malin Ahlberg (born 3 August 1991) is a Swedish football forward.
