= Christopher Tvrdy =

Austrian footballer

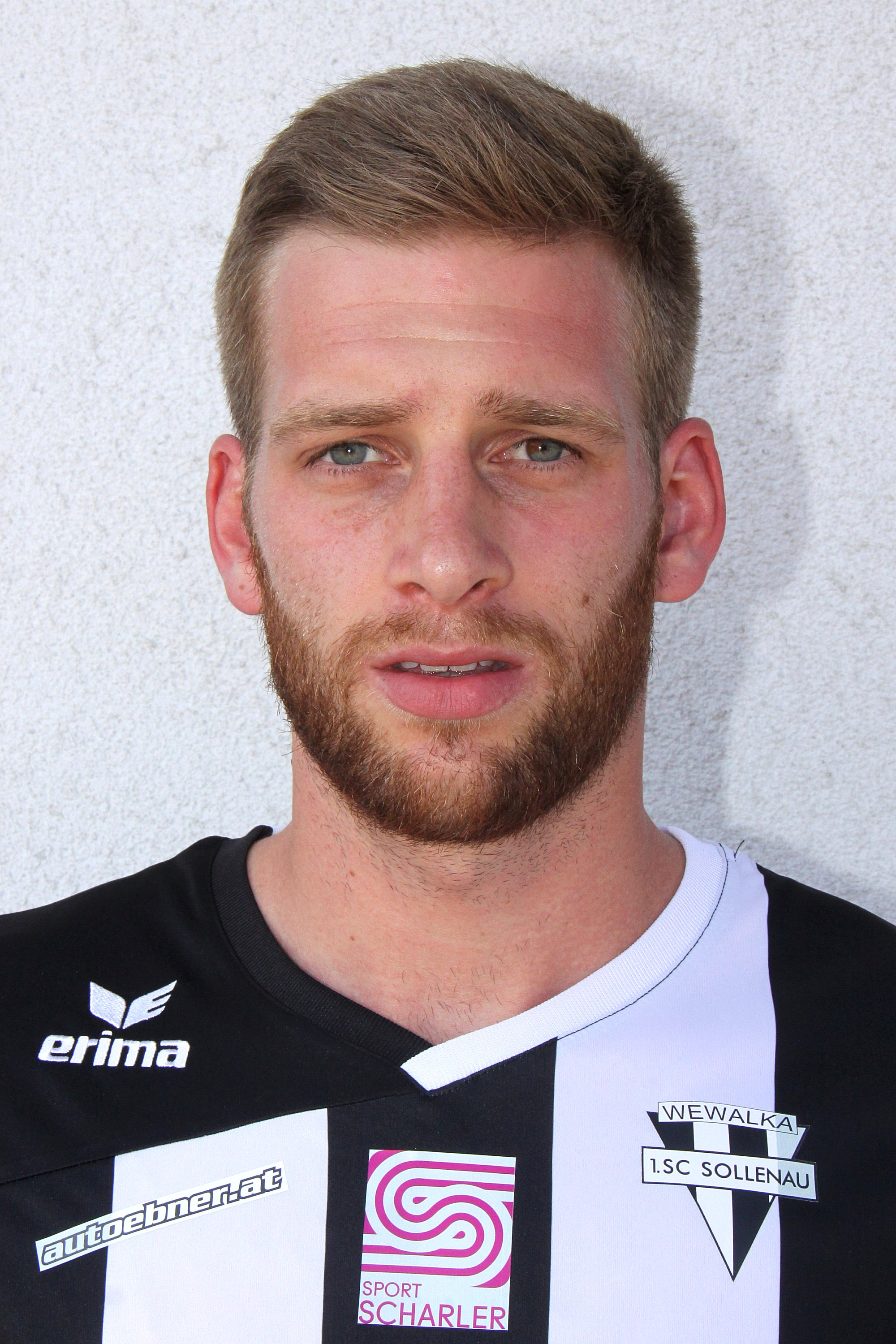

Personal information
- Date of birth: 20 February 1991 (age 35)
- Place of birth: Wiener Neustadt, Austria
- Height: 1.83 m (6 ft 0 in)
- Position: Midfielder

Team information
- Current team: Wiener Neustadt
- Number: 12

Youth career
- SKN St. Pölten

Senior career*
Years	Team	Apps	(Gls)
2008–2009	SKN St. Pölten	0	(0)
2009–2010	ASK Baumgarten	6	(1)
2010–2012	Wiener Neustadt	6	(0)
2012–2013	1. SC Sollenau	20	(4)
2013–2014	ASK Eggendorf		
2014–2015	SC Neudörfl		
2015	1. SC Sollenau	15	(2)
2016	ASK Ebreichsdorf	8	(0)
2016–2022	ASK Bad Fischau-Brunn		
2022–2023	Wiener Neustadt II		
2023–	Wiener Neustadt	78	(33)
- * Club domestic league appearances and goals as of 16:00, 13 April 2026 (UTC)

Christopher Tvrdy (born 20 February 1991) is an Austrian footballer who plays for Wiener Neustadt.
