= Leonid Bobylev =

Russian composer (born 1949 -died 2025)

Leonid Bobylev, 1972, Moscow

Leonid Borisovich Bobylev, also Bobylyov (Леони́д Бори́сович Бобылё́в, born October 15, 1949, in Tula, died January 7, 2025) is a Russian composer.

Bobylev graduated from the Moscow Conservatory, where he studied composition with Mikhail Chulaki, a professor at the Moscow Conservatory.

== Works ==
Bobylev has composed 7 operas, 1 ballet, 10 concertos, a symphony, a symphonic poems "De profundis" and "…e poi…", 4 concerti grossi, 9 oratorios and cantatas, chamber music for solo instruments and ensembles, and some music for theatre and motion pictures.

Opera

- Gregory Melehov (1980, libretto by A.Medvedev after Mikhail Sholokhov's novel "And Quiet Flows the Don", the concert audition of the fragments Moscow, 1988)
- The Lost Hunt (1981, libretto by Tatiana Vershinina and Leonid Bobylev after prose by V. Astafiev, the concert audition Moscow, 1983)
- Who Invented the Soap Balloons? (1989, for children, libretto by O. Volozova);
- Hi, Alice! (1993, for the juniors, premiere Moscow; 1993)
- …With the Last Kissing… (1994, mono-opera, libretto by Leonid Bobylev after the novel Doctor Zhivago by Boris Pasternak premiere Moscow, 2001)
- Playing Chehov (2000, libretto by Leonid Bobylev after Anton Chekhov's stories)

Orchestra

- Miracles of the Forest, suite (1979)
- Symphony (1985)
- De Profundis, symphonic poem (premiere Moscow, 1992, recording on Broadcast Nord France 1993)

Concertante

- Concerto for viola and string orchestra (1970)
- Viennese Musical Box (Венская шкатулка), Concerto Grosso No.3 for violin, viola, piano and string orchestra (2007)
