= Luca Flavio Artaria =

Italian footballer

Luca Artaria
Personal information
- Full name: Luca Flavio Artaria
- Date of birth: 25 June 1991 (age 35)
- Place of birth: Milan, Italy
- Height: 1.79 m (5 ft 10 1/2 in)
- Position: Forward

Team information
- Current team: Seregno

Youth career
- 2009–2010: Legnano
- 2010–2011: Novara

Senior career*
Years	Team	Apps	(Gls)
2011–2013	Pro Patria	48	(1)
2013–2014	S.C. Vallée d'Aoste	23	(8)
2015–2016	OltrepòVoghera	23	(5)
2016–2017	Cavenago Fanfulla	21	(8)
2017–	Seregno	0	(0)
- * Club domestic league appearances and goals ‡ National team caps and goals as of 25 September 2017

Luca Flavio Artaria (born 25 June 1991) is an Italian professional football player currently playing for Seregno. He was born in Milan.
