= Jorge Iván Bocanegra =

Colombian footballer (born 1991)

Personal information
- Full name: Jorge Iván Bocanegra Arenas
- Date of birth: March 23, 1991 (age 35)
- Place of birth: Líbano, Tolima, Colombia
- Height: 1.75 m (5 ft 9 in)
- Position: Striker

Team information
- Current team: Millonarios

Senior career*
Years	Team	Apps	(Gls)
2009–2010	Deportes Tolima	21	(0)
2010–present	Millonarios	0	(0)
- * Club domestic league appearances and goals as of November 14, 2010

Jorge Iván Bocanegra born in Líbano, Tolima, Colombia on 23 March 1991 is a football player, who plays for Millonarios in the Categoría Primera A, as striker .

== Statistics (Official games/Colombian Ligue and Colombian Cup) ==
(As of November 14, 2010)

Year	Team	Colombian Ligue Matches	Goals	Colombian Cup Matches	Goals	Total Matches	Total Goals
2010	Millonarios	0	0	0	0	0	0
Total	Millonarios	0	0	0	0	0	0
