= Dale Lee =

Montserratian footballer

Personal information
- Date of birth: 15 July 1991 (age 35)
- Place of birth: Plymouth, Montserrat
- Position: Midfielder

Team information
- Current team: Barkingside

Senior career*
Years	Team	Apps	(Gls)
2012–2013	Romford		
2013–2014	Rhyl	0	(0)
2014–2016	Prestatyn Town	21	(0)
2016–	Barkingside		

International career^{‡}
2011–2012	Montserrat	4	(0)
- * Club domestic league appearances and goals as of 08:11, 16 October 2018 (UTC) ‡ National team caps and goals as of 08:11, 16 October 2018 (UTC)

Dale Lee (born 15 July 1991) is a Montserratian international footballer who plays for English club Barkingside, as a midfielder.

== Career ==
Born in Plymouth, Lee has played club football for Romford, Rhyl, Prestatyn Town and Barkingside.

Lee made his international debut for Montserrat on 17 June 2011, in a FIFA World Cup qualifier. He earned a further 3 caps in the 2012 Caribbean Cup. He earned a total of four caps to date between 2011 and 2012.
