= Jesse-Juho Kuusisto =

Finnish footballer (born 1991)

Personal information
- Date of birth: 27 March 1991 (age 35)
- Place of birth: Finland
- Position: Defender

Team information
- Current team: Tampere United
- Number: 4

Senior career*
Years	Team	Apps	(Gls)
2009–	Tampere United	7	(0)
- * Club domestic league appearances and goals as of 12 October 2009

Jesse-Juho Kuusisto (born 27 March 1991) is a Finnish football player who currently plays for Tampere United in the Finnish Veikkausliiga.
