= Deivison =

Brazilian footballer (born 1991)

Personal information
- Full name: Deivison William Borges
- Date of birth: 12 April 1991 (age 35)
- Place of birth: Porto Alegre, Brazil
- Height: 1.87 m (6 ft 1 1/2 in)
- Position: Forward

Team information
- Current team: Santarém
- Number: 27

Senior career*
Years	Team	Apps	(Gls)
2013	Esportivo	0	(0)
2013	Lajeadense	2	(0)
2013	Juventude		
2014	SE Patrocinense		
2014	Galícia		
2014	CA Patrocinense	0	(0)
2014	Barra Mansa		
2015	Bangu	0	(0)
2016	Bonsucesso	0	(0)
2016	Macaé	11	(3)
2016–2017	Resende	0	(0)
2017–2018	Uberlândia	7	(0)
2018–2021	Covilhã	65	(7)
2021–	Santarém	3	(0)
- * Club domestic league appearances and goals as of 28 August 2021

Deivison William Borges (born 12 April 1991), commonly known as Deivison, is a Brazilian footballer who plays as a forward for Portuguese club Santarém.

== Career statistics ==
=== Club ===
As of 5 May 2019.

Club	Season	League			State League		Cup		Other		Total	
Club	Season	Division	Apps	Goals	Apps	Goals	Apps	Goals	Apps	Goals	Apps	Goals
Esportivo	2013	–			2 (Note: Appearances in the Campeonato Gaúcho)	0	0	0	0	0	2	0
Lajeadense	2013	Série D	2	0	0	0	0	0	0	0	2	0
CA Patrocinense	2014	–			1 (Note: Appearances in the Campeonato Mineiro A2)	0	0	0	0	0	1	0
Bangu	2015	–			5 (Note: Appearances in the Campeonato Carioca)	0	0	0	0	0	5	0
Bonsucesso	2016	–			12	5	0	0	0	0	12	5
Macaé	2016	Série C	11	3	0	0	0	0	0	0	11	3
Resende	2017	–			1	0	0	0	0	0	1	0
Uberlândia	2018	Série D	7	0	5 (Note: Appearances in the Campeonato Mineiro)	1	2 (Note: Appearances in the Copa do Brasil)	0	0	0	14	1
Covilhã	2018–19	LigaPro	28	5	–		3 (Note: Appearances in the Taça de Portugal)	0	0	0	31	5
Career total			48	8	26	0	5	0	0	0	79	8
