= George Sofroni =

Romanian footballer

Personal information
- Full name: George Daniel Sofroni
- Date of birth: 10 June 1991 (age 35)
- Place of birth: Romania
- Height: 1.74 m (5 ft 8 1/2 in)
- Position: Midfielder

Team information
- Current team: New Bradwell St Peter

Youth career
- Ceahlăul Piatra Neamț

Senior career*
Years	Team	Apps	(Gls)
2008–2013	Ceahlăul Piatra Neamţ	8	(1)
2011	→ Callatis Mangalia (loan)	5	(0)
2013–2017	CSM Roman		
2017	New Bradwell St Peter		

International career
2009	Romania U-19	3	(0)
- * Club domestic league appearances and goals as of 3 March 2017

George Daniel Sofroni (born 10 June 1991) is a Romanian footballer. He plays for New Bradwell St Peter. He made his debut in Liga I for Ceahlăul Piatra Neamţ.
