= Facundo Cabrera =

Uruguayan football player (born 1991)

Personal information
- Full name: Facundo David Cabrera Premutico
- Date of birth: 5 June 1991 (age 35)
- Place of birth: Piriápolis, Uruguay
- Position: Left midfielder

Team information
- Current team: Central Español
- Number: 14

Senior career*
Years	Team	Apps	(Gls)
2016–2017	Atenas	37	(5)
2017–2019	Plaza Colonia	33	(4)
2019	Rentistas	12	(0)
2021–2022	Albion	14	(0)
2022–	Central Español	21	(0)
- * Club domestic league appearances and goals as of 21 January 2023

Facundo David Cabrera Premutico (born 5 June 1991) is a Uruguayan footballer who plays as a midfielder for Central Español in the Uruguayan Segunda División.

== Career ==
In March 2021, Cabrera joined Uruguayan Segunda División club Albion. Cabrera served as a key part of the team as they won promotion from the Segunda División, making 14 league appearances. However, Cabrera would leave the club prior to the 2022 season.
