= Milad Fayyazbakhsh =

Iranian football Midfielder

Mohsen Fayyazbakhsh
Personal information
- Full name: Mohsen Fayyazbakhsh
- Date of birth: 26 January 1991 (age 35)
- Place of birth: Bushehr, Iran
- Height: 1.75 m (5 ft 9 in)
- Position: Defensive midfielder

Team information
- Current team: Iranjavan
- Number: 30

Senior career*
| Years | Team | Apps | (Gls) |
| 2009– | Iranjavan | 37 | (0) |

International career
| 2012–2013 | Iran U–22 | 1 | (0) |
- * Club domestic league appearances and goals as of 31 January 2013

Mohsen "Milad" Fayyazbakhsh (Persian: محسن (میلاد) فياض‌ بخش, born January 26, 1991, in Bushehr, Iran) is an Iranian football midfielder. He currently plays for Azadegan League club Iranjavan, as well as the Iran national under-22 football team.

== Club career ==
=== Iranjavan ===
Fayyazbakhsh started his career at Iranjavan when he was 18 years old. During the 2011–12 Azadegan League he performed well and was invited to play on Iran U–22. In the summer of 2012 he was close to signing with Esteghlal, but finally decided to stay at Bushehr and extend his contract until 2014. As of winter 2013 he has had offers to play for Fajr Sepasi, but he has stated that he will stay at Iranjavan until the end of the season.

=== Persepolis ===
On 2 June 2013, he joined the Persepolis preseason camp in Ardabil. However, he failed the technical tests and returned to Iranjavan after a few days.

=== Club career statistics ===
As of 31 January 2013.

| Club | Division | Season | League | | Hazfi Cup | | Asia | | Total | |
| Club | Division | Season | Apps | Goals | Apps | Goals | Apps | Goals | Apps | Goals |
|---|---|---|---|---|---|---|---|---|---|---|
| Iranjavan | Division 1 | 2009–10 | 0 | 0 | 0 | 0 | – | – | 0 | 0 |
| Iranjavan | Division 1 | 2010–11 | 2 | 0 | 0 | 0 | – | – | 0 | 0 |
| Iranjavan | Division 1 | 2011–12 | 19 | 0 | 2 | 0 | – | – | 0 | 0 |
| Iranjavan | Division 1 | 2012–13 | 16 | 0 | 0 | 0 | – | – | 0 | 0 |
| Career Total | | | 37 | 0 | 2 | 0 | 0 | 0 | 39 | 0 |

== International career ==
=== Youth ===
He was called to play for the Iran national under-23 football team by Ali Reza Mansourian once in 2012.
