= Brandon Saldaña =

Puerto Rican footballer

Brandon Joseph Saldaña (born May 20, 1991) is a footballer who plays as a goalkeeper. Born in the continental United States, he has represented the Puerto Rican national team. Saldaña has earned three international caps with the Puerto Rican squad. In addition, Saldaña has served as the backup goalkeeper on the Amherst College men’s soccer team in Amherst, Massachusetts.

== Background ==
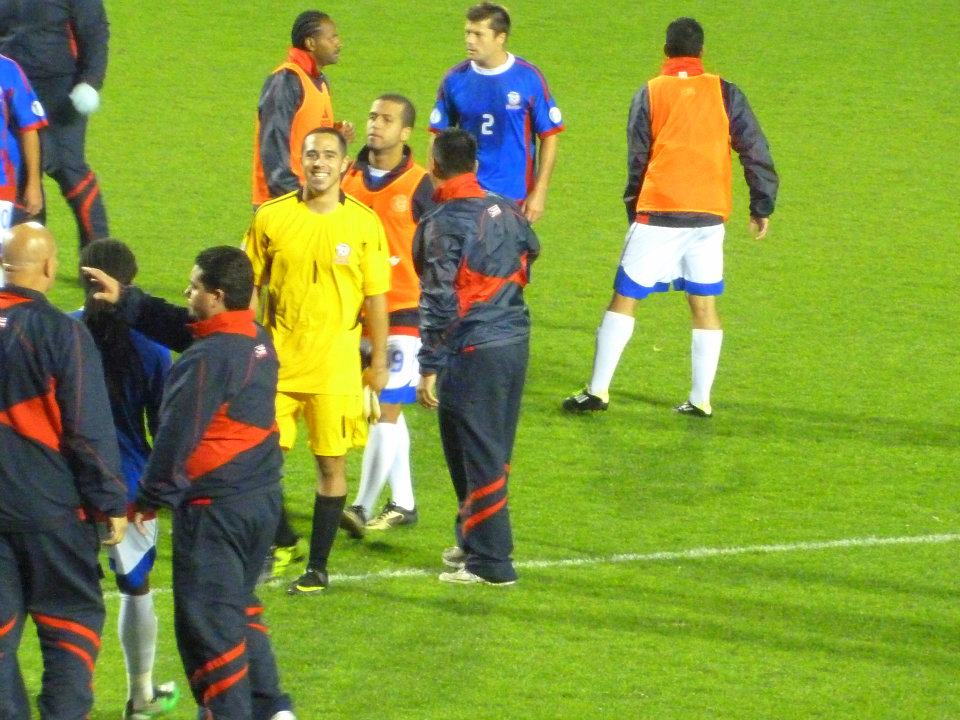
Puerto Rico v. Canada 0-0

Saldaña’s grandparents were born in Puerto Rico and emigrated to New York City. Saldaña is a second-generation American and grew up in Garden City, New York with his parents and older sibling.

== Early years ==
=== Massapequa Terminators ===
Before beginning his high school career at Chaminade High School (Mineola, NY) Saldaña served as a goalkeeper (May 2004 - August 2010) for the Massapequa Terminators, an elite travel Soccer team. Saldaña traveled both nationally and internationally to compete in Premier Soccer Tournaments.

=== Chaminade High School ===
Saldaña attended Chaminade High School (Mineola, NY) from August 2005 to June 2009, where he graduated academically ranked in the 90th percentile and served as a goalkeeper on the school's varsity soccer team.

== Amherst College ==
Saldaña attends Amherst College (Amherst, Massachusetts) where he is studying for his Bachelor of Arts with a concentration in Mathematics. His anticipated graduation was May 2013 and his long-term goal is a career in financial services. Saldaña serves as the backup goalkeeper on the Amherst College Men’s Varsity Team. Saldaña has appeared in four games this season, allowing one goal and saving two shots in just over 132 minutes of play. In addition to his academic and athletic endeavors, Saldaña is a co-owner and operator of MAStorage, Inc., a storage company providing storage for students at Amherst, UMASS, Mt. Holyoke, Smith and Hampshire Colleges.

== “El Huracán Azul” ==
Saldaña began his international career with “El Huracán Azul” (World Rank 106) in early October 2011 after the starting goalkeeper was injured on Sept. 2 while playing in the World Cup qualifier against St. Kitts and Nevis. Saldaña was flown down to tryout and quickly earned his spot in the starting line up. Saldaña earned his first international shutout on October 11, 2011 against team Canada (0-0) at BMO Field in Toronto, Canada.

=== International games played ===
- October 7, 2011: Puerto Rico v. St. Kitts & Nevis: 1-1
- October 11, 2011: Puerto Rico v. Canada: 0-0
- November 14, 2011: Puerto Rico v. St. Lucia 3-0
