= Michel Ternest =

Belgian footballer

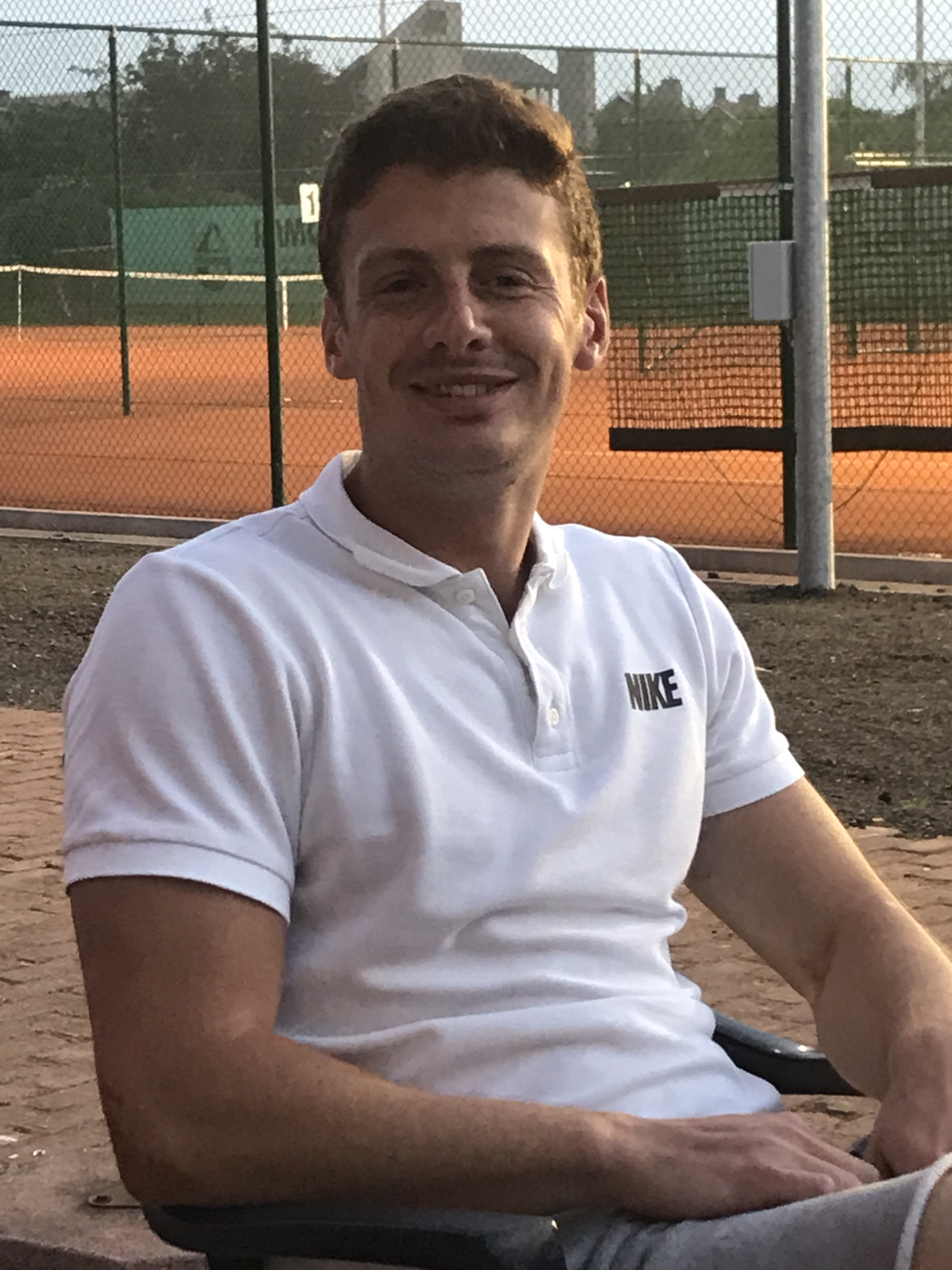

Personal information
- Date of birth: 6 August 1991 (age 35)
- Place of birth: Kenitra, Morocco
- Height: 1.70 m (5 ft 7 in)
- Position: Striker

Team information
- Current team: Jong Zulte
- Number: 10

Senior career*
Years	Team	Apps	(Gls)
2007–2011	Roeselare	1	(0)
2010	→ Ieper (loan)		
2010–2011	→ Oudenaarde (loan)		
2011–2015	Torhout		
2015–2016	Knokke		
2016–2018	Vlamertinge		
2018–	Jong Zulte		
- * Club domestic league appearances and goals as of 21 April 2022

Michel Ternest (born 6 August 1991) is a Belgian footballer who plays as a forward for Belgian Fourth Provincial club Jong Zulte.
