= Ondřej Kraják =

Czech footballer

Personal information
- Date of birth: 20 April 1991 (age 35)
- Place of birth: Hradec Králové, Czechoslovakia
- Height: 1.87 m (6 ft 2 in)
- Position: Forward

Team information
- Current team: FK Kratonohy

Youth career
- 2006–2009: Sparta Prague

Senior career*
Years	Team	Apps	(Gls)
2009–2013	Sparta Prague II	37	(1)
2011–2012	→ Bohemians 1905 (loan)	6	(0)
2013–2015	Hradec Králové	10	(1)
2015–2016	Union 2013	?	(?)
2016	Slavoj Vyšehrad	6	(0)
2016–2017	Olympia Prague	?	(?)
2017–	FK Kratonohy	?	(?)
- * Club domestic league appearances and goals as of 2 February 2013

Ondřej Kraják (born 20 April 1991) is a Czech footballer who currently plays for FK Kratonohy. His playing position is forward.

== Career ==
Krajak played previously for Bohemians 1905 and AC Sparta Praha.
