= Milton Raphael =

Brazilian footballer

Personal information
- Full name: Milton Raphael Guimarães Pires
- Date of birth: 11 May 1991 (age 35)
- Place of birth: Volta Redonda, Brazil
- Height: 1.87 m (6 ft 2 in)
- Position: Goalkeeper

Youth career
- 2005–2007: Volta Redonda
- 2007–2010: Botafogo

Senior career*
Years	Team	Apps	(Gls)
2010–2017	Botafogo	5	(0)
2014	→ Caxias (loan)	0	(0)
2014	→ Macaé (loan)	10	(0)
2015	→ Sampaio Corrê (loan)	10	(0)
2016	→ Boavista-RJ (loan)	1	(0)
2016	→ Macaé (loan)	19	(0)
2017	Macaé	11	(0)
2017–2018	Portuguesa-RJ	11	(0)
2018–2020	Vitória Setúbal	1	(0)
2020	Portuguesa-RJ	16	(0)
2021	Macaé	6	(0)
2022	Madureira	0	(0)
2022–2023	Macaé	0	(0)
2023	→ Morrinhos (loan)	2	(0)
2023	Bahia de FeiraJ	1	(0)
2023–2024	Al-Jeel	3	(0)
- * Club domestic league appearances and goals as of 20:00, 17 April 2021 (UTC)

Milton Raphael Guimarães Pires (born 11 May 1991) is a Brazilian professional footballer who plays as a goalkeeper.

== Career ==
Raphael made his professional debut with Botafogo in a 5–2 Campeonato Carioca loss to Boavista-RJ on 23 April 2011. On 29 June 2018, he moved to Vitória Setúbal in the Portuguese Primeira Liga.
