= Jennie Wecksell =

Swedish footballer

Personal information
- Date of birth: 7 July 1991 (age 35)
- Place of birth: Sweden
- Height: 1.63 m (5 ft 4 in)
- Position: Defender

Senior career*
Years	Team	Apps	(Gls)
2010–2011	KIF Örebro DFF	14	(0)
2011	→ Gustafs GoIF	3	(2)
2013–2016	KIF Örebro DFF	33	(0)
- * Club domestic league appearances and goals as of 08:35, 21 May 2016 (UTC)

Jennie Wecksell (born 7 July 1991) is a Swedish football defender.

== Honours ==
KIF Örebro DFF

Winner

- Swedish Cup: 2010

Runner-up

- Damallsvenskan: 2014
