= Dariusz Góral =

Polish footballer (born 1991)

Personal information
- Full name: Dariusz Góral
- Date of birth: 20 April 1991 (age 35)
- Place of birth: Wrocław, Poland
- Height: 1.76 m (5 ft 9 1/2 in)
- Position: Striker

Youth career
- Polar Wrocław

Senior career*
Years	Team	Apps	(Gls)
2008	Polar Wrocław-Zawidawie		
2009	Śląsk Wrocław (ME)		
2009–2013	Śląsk Wrocław	1	(0)
2010–2011	→ MKS Kluczbork (loan)	19	(1)
2011–2012	→ Polonia Bytom (loan)	17	(0)
2013–2014	Ślęza Wrocław	31	(8)
2014–2015	Foto-Higiena Gać	18	(2)
2015	Dolpasz Skokowa		
2015–2019	GKS Mirków/Długołęka		
- * Club domestic league appearances and goals

Dariusz Góral (born 20 April 1991) is a Polish former professional footballer who played as a striker.

== Career ==
=== Club ===
Góral made his Ekstraklasa debut on 16 October 2009. He was loaned to MKS Kluczbork from Śląsk Wrocław on a one-year deal in 2010.

In July 2011, he was loaned to Polonia Bytom on a one-year deal.

== Honours ==
Ślęza Wrocław

- III liga Lower Silesia–Silesia: 2013–14
