= Juan Mbo Ondo =

Equatoguinean footballer (born 1991)

Helguera
Personal information
- Full name: Juan Mbo Ondo
- Date of birth: 13 January 1991 (age 35)
- Place of birth: Ebibeyin, Equatorial Guinea
- Position: Centre-back

Senior career*
| Years | Team | Apps | (Gls) |
| 2008–2010 | Atlético Malabo | | |
| 2011–2018 | Sony de Elá Nguema | | |
| 2019–20?? | Futuro Kings | | |

International career^{‡}
| 2009 | Equatorial Guinea | 1 | (0) |
- * Club domestic league appearances and goals ‡ National team caps and goals as of 28 March 2009

Juan Mbo Ondo (born 13 January 1991), sportingly known as Helguera, is an Equatoguinean footballer who plays as a centre-back. He was a member of the Equatorial Guinea national team.

He received his nickname as a tribute to former Real Madrid defender Iván Helguera.

== Club career ==
Born in Ebibeyin, Kié-Ntem, Helguera emigrated to Malabo, the Equatoguinean capital. There he played for Atlético Malabo for two seasons, then was transferred to cross-town rival Sony de Elá Nguema.

== International career ==
In October 2008, Helguera was called up by the national team for a 2010 FIFA World Cup qualifier match against South Africa. He was an unused substitute in that game. Helguera made his international debut with the national team on 28 March 2009 in a 0–5 friendly loss to Cape Verde in Espargos.
