= Ahmed Saif (footballer) =

Emirati association football player (born 1991)

Ahmed Saif أحمد سيف
Personal information
- Full name: Ahmed Saif Mohammed Al Zari Al-Shamsi
- Date of birth: 14 May 1991 (age 35)
- Place of birth: Emirates
- Height: 1.70 m (5 ft 7 in)
- Position: Left back

Youth career
- 2005–2008: Dubai
- 2008–2011: Al-Sharjah

Senior career*
Years	Team	Apps	(Gls)
2011–2017	Al-Shaab	47	(0)
2017–2020	Al-Sharjah	4	(0)
- * Club domestic league appearances and goals

Ahmed Saif (Arabic:أحمد سيف) (born 14 May 1991) is an Emirati footballer who plays as a left back.

== Career ==
=== youth career ===
Ahmed Saif started his career at Dubai and is a product of the Dubai's youth system, and joined the youth Al-Sharjah in 2008.

=== Al-Shaab ===
In 2013 he signed with Al-Shaab. On 17 January 2014, Ahmed Saif made his professional debut for Al-Shaab against Al-Nasr in the Pro League, replacing Badr Belal.

=== Al-Sharjah ===
He was playing with Al-Shaab and after merging Al-Sharjah, and Al-Shaab clubs under the name Al-Sharjah he was joined to Al-Sharjah. On 20 September 2018, Ahmed Saif made his professional debut for Al-Sharjah against Shabab Al-Ahli in the Pro League, replacing Al Hassan Saleh. On 17 February 2019, Ahmed Saif was injured during the Al-Sharjah and Al-Nasr match in the UAE Pro League and his team was forced to complete the match with 10 players after the three changes were exhausted.
