= Jermaine van Pijkeren =

Dutch footballer

Jermaine van Pijkeren (born 7 December 1991 in Rotterdam) is a Dutch footballer who played on the professional level for Dutch Eerste Divisie league club FC Dordrecht during the 2011–2012 season.
