= Hayri Pinarci =

Dutch-Turkish footballer

Personal information
- Full name: Hayri Pinarci
- Date of birth: 10 January 1991 (age 35)
- Place of birth: Boğazlıyan, Turkey
- Height: 1.80 m (5 ft 11 in)
- Position: Defensive midfielder

Team information
- Current team: SteDoCo
- Number: 6

Youth career
- Sparta Nijkerk
- Vitesse Arnhem

Senior career*
Years	Team	Apps	(Gls)
2010–2012	Vitesse	2	(0)
2012	→ AGOVV (loan)	18	(1)
2012–2013	AGOVV	18	(3)
2013–2015	Spakenburg	54	(1)
2015–2017	DVS '33	58	(1)
2017–	SteDoCo	53	(1)
- * Club domestic league appearances and goals as of 27 October 2020

Hayri Pinarci (born 10 January 1991) is a Dutch-Turkish footballer who plays for SteDoCo. He formerly played for Vitesse and AGOVV Apeldoorn.

== Career ==
=== VV SteDoCo ===
Pinarci joined VV SteDoCo in July 2017, after the deal was announced in April.
