= Santiago Fernández (footballer, born 1991) =

Uruguayan footballer

Personal information
- Full name: Santiago Fernández Idiart
- Date of birth: 17 January 1991
- Place of birth: Uruguay
- Position: Goalkeeper

Team information
- Current team: CA Artigas

Senior career*
Years	Team	Apps	(Gls)
-2013	Deportivo Maldonado	2	(0)
2014-2015	Boston River	2	(0)
2015-2016	Deportivo Maldonado	3	(0)
2016	Cerro Largo F.C.	0	(0)
2017	Team Taranaki		
2017	Waitakere United		
2017-2018	CF Sant Rafel	17	(0)
2018	Tindastóll	20	(0)
2019	Atenas de San Carlos	22	(0)
2020	Rampla Juniors	11	(0)
2022-	CA Artigas	0	(0)
- * Club domestic league appearances and goals

Santiago Fernández Idiart (born 17 January 1991 in Uruguay) is a Uruguayan footballer who plays for Uruguayan club CA Artigas.
