= Hussein El Husseiny =

Egyptian footballer (born 1991)

Personal information
- Date of birth: April 21, 1991 (age 35)
- Position: Defender

Team information
- Current team: Al Nasr

Senior career*
Years	Team	Apps	(Gls)
–2012	Wadi Degla		
2012–2015	Ghazl El Mahalla		
2016–2017	Kafr El Sheikh		
2017–	Al Nasr SC		
- * Club domestic league appearances and goals as of 7 September 2017

Hussein El Husseiny (Arabic: حسين الحسيني; born April 21, 1991) is an Egyptian professional footballer who currently plays as a defender for Al Nasr. In 2017, El Husseiny signed a 3-year contract for Al Nasr in a free transfer from Kafr El Sheikh.
