= Matteo Lignani =

Italian footballer

Personal information
- Date of birth: September 7, 1991 (age 35)
- Place of birth: Città di Castello, Italy
- Height: 1.81 m (5 ft 11 in)
- Position: Right midfielder

Team information
- Current team: Trestina

Youth career
- –2008: Perugia
- 2008–2010: Livorno

Senior career*
Years	Team	Apps	(Gls)
2009–2013	Livorno	12	(0)
2012	→ CFR Cluj (loan)	4	(0)
2013	→ Kriens (loan)	13	(3)
2013–2014	Varese	0	(0)
2014–2015	Perugia	1	(0)
2015–2016	Ancona	0	(0)
2016–2017	Civitanovese	13	(1)
2017–2018	Vis Pesaro	29	(1)
2018	Castelfidardo	15	(2)
2019–	Trestina	11	(0)
- * Club domestic league appearances and goals as of 3 April 2019

Matteo Lignani (born September 7, 1991) is an Italian professional football player who currently plays as a midfielder for Trestina.

== Club career ==
He made his Serie A debut for Livorno on May 9, 2010 in a game against Lazio when he came on as a substitute in the 87th minute for Davide Moro.

On 5 September 2012, he joined CFR Cluj on loan.
