= Iván Jiménez =

Spanish footballer

Personal information
- Full name: Iván Jiménez Vilalba
- Date of birth: 11 October 1991 (age 35)
- Place of birth: Arcos de la Frontera, Spain
- Height: 1.80 m (5 ft 11 in)
- Position: Midfielder

Team information
- Current team: Arcos

Youth career
- Xerez

Senior career*
Years	Team	Apps	(Gls)
2010–2013	Xerez B	24	(5)
2012	Xerez	1	(0)
2013–2014	Pobla Mafumet	16	(0)
2014–	Arcos	126	(28)
- * Club domestic league appearances and goals as of 11 February 2018

Iván Jiménez Villalba (born 11 October 1991), commonly known as Maqui, is a Spanish footballer. He plays for Arcos CF as a midfielder.

== Club career ==
Born in Arcos de la Frontera, Province of Cádiz, Jiménez finished his formation with Xerez CD, making his debuts as a senior with the reserves in 2010–11 season, representing the side in Primera Andaluza (fifth level).

Jiménez made his official debut for the Andalusians' first team on 3 June 2012, playing the last 24 minutes in a 0–6 home loss against FC Barcelona B.

On 10 July 2013 Jiménez signed with CF Pobla de Mafumet, in Tercera División. After appearing in 16 matches during the campaign, he moved to hometown's Arcos CF also in the fourth level.
