= Amran, Gujarat =

Amran, formerly known as Ambran is a village in morbi Taluka of morbi district of Gujarat, India.

== History ==
It was the residence of the descendants of the Khavas family of Navanagar State to whom this estate belonged during British period.

Amran is an ancient town and is celebrated as containing the shrine of a Muslim saint or pir called Daval Shah. This man was the son of one of the nobles of Sultan Mahmud Begada of Gujarat Sultanate, named Malik Mahmud Quraishi. His own name was Malik Abd-ul-Latif, but he had received the title of Davar-ul-Mulk from the Sultan. He was faujdar of Ambran and had subdued the neighboring Rajputs. He was assassinated by a Rajput in 1509, and was made a saint after his death by the title of Daval Shah. Daval is doubtless a corruption of Davar in his title of Davar-ul-Mulk. His tomb is a place of pilgrimage to this day.
