= Markus Gröger =

German footballer (born 1991)

Personal information
- Date of birth: 30 May 1991 (age 35)
- Place of birth: Berlin, Germany
- Height: 1.82 m (6 ft 0 in)
- Position: Defender

Youth career
- –2004: JSG Limeshain
- 2004–2010: FSV Frankfurt

Senior career*
Years	Team	Apps	(Gls)
2010–2012	FSV Frankfurt II	41	(0)
2012–2014	Eintracht Frankfurt II	59	(1)
2014–2016	Hansa Rostock	13	(0)
2014–2016	Hansa Rostock II	10	(0)
2016–2018	Borussia Fulda	49	(1)
2018–2022	SG Barockstadt Fulda-Lehnerz	79	(3)
- * Club domestic league appearances and goals

Markus Gröger (born 30 May 1991) is a German former footballer who played as a defender.

== Career ==
Gröger made his professional debut for Hansa Rostock in the 3. Liga on 23 August 2014, coming on as a substitute in the 80th minute for Robin Krauße in the 4–4 away draw against Jahn Regensburg.
