= Héctor Pérez (footballer, born 1991) =

Venezuela footballer (born 1991)

Personal information
- Full name: Héctor Eduardo Pérez Cuevas
- Date of birth: 16 June 1991 (age 35)
- Place of birth: Acarigua, Venezuela
- Height: 1.85 m (6 ft 1 in)
- Position: Goalkeeper

Team information
- Current team: Aragua F.C.
- Number: 12

Senior career*
Years	Team	Apps	(Gls)
2010–2011	Deportivo Lara	8	(0)
2011–2017	Trujillanos F.C.	64	(0)
2017–2018	Deportivo Socopó	13	(0)
2018–	Aragua F.C.	2	(0)
- * Club domestic league appearances and goals as of 23 March 2019

Héctor Eduardo Pérez Cuevas (born 16 June 1991) is a Venezuelan footballer who plays as a goalkeeper for Aragua F.C. in the Venezuelan Primera División.
