= Hayri Sevimli =

German footballer

Personal information
- Full name: Hayri Sevimli
- Date of birth: 22 February 1991 (age 35)
- Place of birth: Bremen, Germany
- Height: 1.71 m (5 ft 7 in)
- Position: Midfielder

Youth career
- –2009: VfB Oldenburg
- 2009–2010: VfL Osnabrück

Senior career*
Years	Team	Apps	(Gls)
2009	VfB Oldenburg	1	(0)
2009–2010	VfL Osnabrück II	1	(0)
2010–2011	Carl Zeiss Jena II	23	(3)
2010–2011	Carl Zeiss Jena	1	(0)
Total		26	(3)
- * Club domestic league appearances and goals

Hayri Sevimli (born 22 February 1991) is a German former professional footballer who plays as a midfielder.

== Career ==
Sevimli made his professional debut for Carl Zeiss Jena in the 3. Liga on 2 October 2010, coming on as a substitute in the 68th minute for Josip Landeka in a 3–1 home loss against Hansa Rostock.

== Personal life ==
Sevimli was accused of attacking and injuring a ticket inspector in Jena with a glass bottle on 14 November 2010 together with fellow Carl Zeiss Jena youth player Ömer Cay. The Jena public prosecutor's office were investigating the situation involving Cay and Sevimli. Following the incident, Carl Zeiss Jena temporarily suspended Sevimli from play and training operations.
