= Antonio Franco (footballer, born 1991) =

Paraguayan footballer

Personal information
- Full name: Antonio Alejandro Franco Arza
- Date of birth: 10 July 1991 (age 35)
- Place of birth: Capiatá, Paraguay
- Height: 1.85 m (6 ft 1 in)
- Position: Goalkeeper

Team information
- Current team: Club Guaraní
- Number: 25

Youth career
- 2008–2009: Club Libertad

Senior career*
Years	Team	Apps	(Gls)
2010–2012	Club Libertad	?	(?)
2013–2014	Deportivo Capiatá	51	(0)
2015–	Club Guaraní	1	(0)
- * Club domestic league appearances and goals as of 13 November 2014 ‡ National team caps and goals as of 13 November 2014

Antonio Alejandro Franco Arza (born 10 July 1991) is a Paraguayan footballer who plays for Club Guaraní in the Paraguayan Primera División.

== Club career ==
Franco became known internationally after his great performance against Boca Juniors in the 2014 Copa Sudamericana.

== International career ==
After strong performances at the club was first called up to the Paraguay friendlies against Peru in November 2014.
