= Ivan Bobylev =

Russian footballer

Personal information
- Full name: Ivan Andreyevich Bobylev
- Date of birth: 7 March 1991 (age 35)
- Place of birth: Suzdal, Russian SFSR
- Height: 1.86 m (6 ft 1 in)
- Position: Defender

Youth career
- –2006: Football SDYuShOR Vladimir
- 2006: FC Spartak Moscow
- 2006–2009: UOR Master-Saturn Yegoryevsk

Senior career*
Years	Team	Apps	(Gls)
2008	FC Master-Saturn Yegoryevsk		
2009	FC Volga-D Nizhny Novgorod		
2011–2012	FC Torpedo Vladimir	1	(0)
2012	FC Torpedo Vladimir (amateur)		
2013–2014	FC Torpedo Vladimir	0	(0)
2014	FC Luch-Atlet Vyazniki		
- * Club domestic league appearances and goals

Ivan Andreyevich Bobylev (Russian: Иван Андреевич Бобылёв; born 7 March 1991) is a former Russian professional footballer.

== Club career ==
He made his Russian Football National League debut for FC Torpedo Vladimir on 27 May 2012 in a game against FC Chernomorets Novorossiysk. He played Central Midfield.
