= Zakaria Amrani =

Dutch footballer and futsal player

Personal information
- Date of birth: 29 March 1991 (age 35)
- Place of birth: Rotterdam, Netherlands
- Position: Central midfielder

Youth career
- 2004–2009: RKSV Spartaan '20
- 2009–2010: FC Utrecht

Senior career*
Years	Team	Apps	(Gls)
2010–2012	FC Utrecht	1	(0)
2012–2013	Willem II	0	(0)
2013–2014	Haaglandia	22	(6)
2015–2016	Magreb'90	11	(0)

International career^{‡}
2014–	Netherlands (futsal)	23	(4)
- * Club domestic league appearances and goals as of 7 April 2014 (UTC) ‡ National team caps and goals as of 5 April 2026

Zakaria Amrani (born 29 March 1991, Rotterdam) is a Dutch footballer and futsal player.

== Club career ==
Amrani signed for the FC Utrecht youth team in July 2009, and made his senior debut for them the next season, in an October 2010 Eredivisie match against Vitesse.

He then played for amateurs Haaglandia in the Dutch Topklasse and Magreb'90.

=== Futsal ===
He also played for futsal clubs SC Noordzee, ZVV Den Haag, FC Marlene and Hovocubo, then joined FC Eindhoven from the latter in May 2020.

== International career ==
Amrani made his debut for the Netherlands national futsal team in January 2014 against Hungary.
