= Hicham El Amrani (sports executive) =

Moroccan sports executive

- Born: March 29, 1979 (age 46); Casablanca, Morocco

Hicham El Amrani was the General Secretary of the Confederation of African Football. He was appointed in September 2011 and served until 2017.

El Amrani succeeded Egyptian Mustapha Fahmy in the position which he had held for 28 years, initially as an interim solution in October 2010. On 26 March 2017, he resigned from the position after serving for eight years without giving any reasons for his decision.

Previously he had worked for the Asian Football Confederation and was involved with marketing of their competitions.
