= Breno Matosinhos =

Brazilian footballer (born 1991)

Breno Matosinhos Santos (born 5 December 1991) is a Brazilian professional footballer who plays as a forward.

== Clubs ==
- Atlético Mineiro 2012
- Universidad de Concepción 2012
- Grêmio Novorizontino 2013
- Paulínia FC 2014

== Honours ==
- Atlético Mineiro 2012 (Minas Gerais Championship)
