= Aybars Garhan =

Turkish footballer

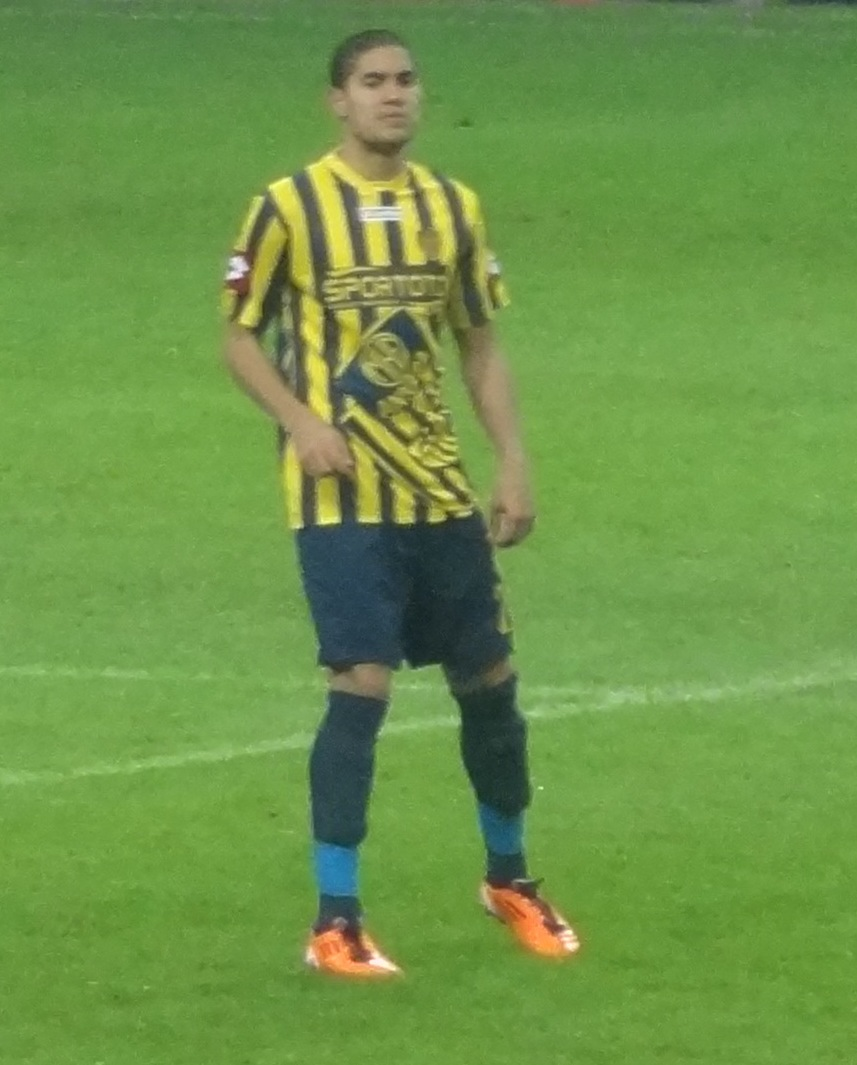

Personal information
- Full name: Atilla Aybars Garhan
- Date of birth: 17 May 1991 (age 35)
- Place of birth: Ankara, Turkey
- Height: 1.74 m (5 ft 9 in)
- Position: Forward

Team information
- Current team: Hacettepe 1945 SK

Youth career
- 2007–2009: Ankaragücü

Senior career*
| Years | Team | Apps | (Gls) |
| 2009–2012 | Ankaragücü | 27 | (5) |
| 2012–2014 | Karabükspor | 2 | (0) |
| 2013–2014 | → Adana Demirspor (loan) | 12 | (2) |
| 2014–2015 | 1461 Trabzon | 9 | (2) |
| 2015–2016 | Fatih Karagümrük | 35 | (2) |
| 2016–2018 | 24 Erzincanspor | 61 | (21) |
| 2018–2020 | Düzcespor | 46 | (7) |
| 2020–2021 | Ofspor | 18 | (4) |
| 2021 | Gölcükspor | 1 | (0) |
| 2021– | Hacettepe 1945 SK | 38 | (5) |

International career^{‡}
| 2009 | Turkey U19 | 4 | (0) |
- * Club domestic league appearances and goals as of 12 November 2022 ‡ National team caps and goals as of 20 February 2013

Atilla Aybars Garhan (born 17 May 1991) is a Turkish footballer who plays as a forward for TFF Third League club Hacettepe 1945 SK. He made his Süper Lig debut on 23 October 2011 for Ankaragücü.
