= Baroda, Western India and Gujarat States Agency =

Agency of India from 1944 to 1947

Coordinates: 22.18°N 73.12°E

- Agency of India
- 1944–1947
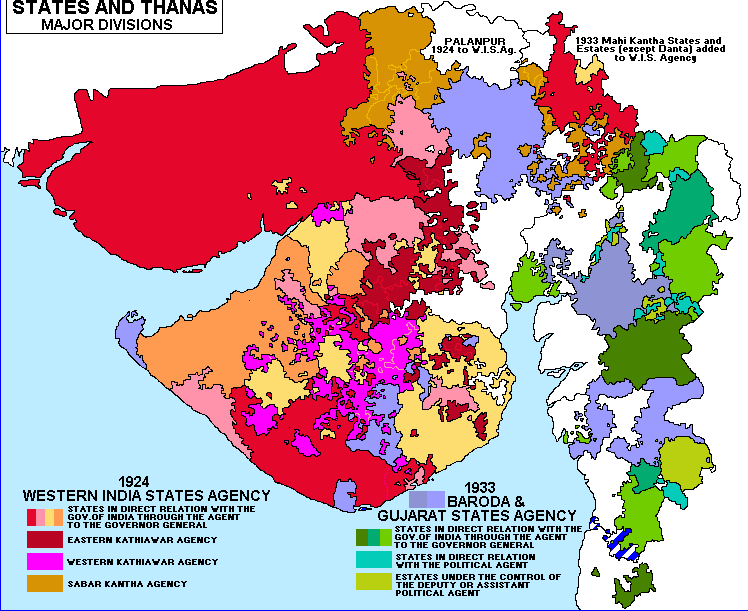
- Map of the area of the Baroda, Western India and Gujarat States Agency
- Area
  - 1931: 58,825 km^{2} (22,712 sq mi)
- Population
  - 1931: 8,980,811
- History
  - Merger of Baroda and Gujarat States Agency and Western India States Agency: 1944
  - Independence of India: 1947
Preceded by
Baroda and Gujarat States Agency
Western India States Agency
Succeeded by
Bombay State
Saurashtra State
Kutch State
- "A collection of treaties, engagements, and sunnuds relating to India and neighbouring countries"

The Baroda, Western India and Gujarat States Agency was an agency of the Indian Empire, managing the relations of the Provincial Government of the Bombay Presidency with a collection of princely states.

The political agent in charge of the agency resided at Baroda (Vadodara).

== History ==
In 1937 the princely states of the Baroda Agency were merged with those of the agencies adjacent to the northern part of the Bombay Presidency, Rewa Kantha Agency, Surat Agency, Nasik Agency, Kaira Agency and Thana Agency, in order to form the Baroda and Gujarat States Agency. On 5 November 1944 the Baroda and Gujarat States Agency was merged with the Western India States Agency (WISA) to form the larger Baroda, Western India and Gujarat States Agency.

After the Independence of India in 1947, as India and Pakistan, the rulers of the princely states of the agency signed the Instrument of Accession and joined India. Only a few princely states such as Junagadh and (Bantva) Manavadar lingering over joining Pakistan. Finally following the accession to India the territories managed by the agency were integrated into the following newly created states:

- Saurashtra State, first named 'United States of Kathiawar', which included the former princely states on the Kathiawar Peninsula.
- Kutch State, former princely Cutch State.
- Bombay State

On 1 November 1956, Bombay State was re-organized under the States Reorganisation Act, absorbing various territories including the Saurashtra and Kutch States, which ceased to exist. Bombay State was split along linguistic lines in 1960, and some princely states which had formerly belonged to this agency became part of Gujarat and others of Maharashtra.

=== Residents at Baroda for Western India and Gujarat States Agency ===
- 5 Nov 1944 - 6 May 1947 Sir Cyril Percy Hancock (**.) (acting to 5 Nov 1944)
- 7 May 1947 – 14 Aug 1947 Leonard George Coke-Wallis (b. 1900 - d. 1974)

== Princely states ==
The number of separate princely states was above 250, but most were minor or petty states, some not even included here. Some of them had been integrated after 1940 during the 'attachment scheme' right before the creation of the agency; the largest one was Baroda State, which merged with Bombay State in 1949.

=== Former Baroda and Gujarat States Agency ===
==== Former Baroda Agency ====
Salute state :

- Baroda State, title Maharaja Gaekwar, Hereditary salute of 21-guns

Non-salute states :

- Agar
- Bhadli
- Bhilodia
- Charkha
- Dadhalia
- Derdi
- Derol
- Gabat
- Gad Boriad
- Gadhula
- Hapa
- Ilol
- Jafrabad
- Jambughoda
- Mandwa
- Nahara
- Noghavandar
- Palaj
- Palasni
- Rupal
- Sihora
- Vajiria
- ?Vasan Sawada State
- Veja
- Vithalgadh

==== Former Rewa Kantha Agency ====
Salute states :

- First Class : Rajpipla (Nandod), title Maharaja, Hereditary salute of 13-guns
- Second Class :
  - Bari(y)a (Devgadh), title Maharaol, Hereditary salute of 9-guns (11 personal)
  - Balasinor, title Nawab, Hereditary salute of 9-guns
  - Chhota Udaipur, title Raja, Hereditary salute of 9-guns
  - Lunavada (Lunawada), title Maharana, Hereditary salute of 9-guns
  - Sant (Sunth), title Raja, Hereditary salute of 9-guns

Non-salute states :

Major Mehwas

- Chhota Udehpur (Mohan), Second Class
- Kadana, Third Class
- Sanjeli, Third Class
- Jambughoda (Narukot), Third Class
- Bhadarva (Bhadarwa), Third Class
- Gad Boriad, Third Class (personal) / Fourth Class
- Mandwa, Third Class (personal) / Fourth Class
- Umet(h)a, Third (personal) / Fourth Class
- Shanor, Fourth Class
- Vajiria, Fourth Class
- Vanmala, Fourth Class (personal) / Fifth Class
- Nangam, Fifth Class
- Sihora, Fourth Class
- Pandu, Fifth Class

minor Mehwas (petty (e)states), in two geographical divisions

Sankheda :

- Agar
- Alwa
- Bhilodia :
  - Motisinghji,
  - Chhatarsinghji
- Bihora
- Chorangla
- Dudhpur
- Chudesar
- Jiral Kamsoli
- Nalia
- Naswadi
- Palasni
- Pantalavdi :
  - Akbar Khan,
  - Kesar Khan
- Rampura
- Regan
- Sindhiapura
- Uchad
- Vadia (Virampura)
- Vasan Sewada
- Vasan Virpur
- Vo(h)ra

Pandu (incl. Dorka estates) :

- Amrapur
- Angadh
- Chhaliar
- Dhari
- Dorka
- Gotardi
- Itwad
- Jesa
- Jumkha
- Kalsa Pagi nu Muvadu
- Kanoda
- Litter Gothda
- Mevli
- Moka Pagi nu Muvadu
- Moti Varnol
- Nani Varnol
- Poicha
- Rayka (Raika)
- Rajpur,
- Vakhtapur
- Varnolmal

==== Smaller former Gujarati agencies ====
Former Kaira Agency : Salute state :

- Cambay, title Nawab, Hereditary salute of 11-guns

Former Nasik Agency :

- Non-salute state : Surgana

Former Surat Agency :

Salute states :

- Dharampur, title Raja, Hereditary salute of 9-guns (11 personal)
- Sachin, title Nawab, Hereditary salute of 9-guns

Non-salute state :

- Bansda

Former Thana Agency : Salute state :

- Jawhar, title Maharaja, Hereditary salute of 9-guns

=== Former Western States Agency ===
==== Former Eastern Kathiawar Agency ====
Salute states :

- Bhavnagar, title Maharaja, Hereditary salute of 13-guns (15-guns local)
- Dhrangadhra, title Maharaja Raj Sahib, Hereditary salute of 13-guns
- Limbdi, title Thakore Sahib, Hereditary salute of 9-guns
- Palitana, title Thakore Sahib, Hereditary salute of 9-guns
- Wadhwan, title Maharana, Hereditary salute of 9-guns

Non-salute states :

- Akadia
- Alampur
- Anandpur
- Ankevalia
- Babra
- Bajana
- Bamanbore
- Bhadli
- Bhadvana
- Bhalala
- Bhalgamda
- Bhandaria
- Bharejda
- Bhathan
- Bhimora
- Bhoika
- Bhojavadar
- Bildi
- Bodanones
- Chachana
- Chamardi
- Chhalala
- Chiroda
- Chitravav
- Chobari
- Chok
- Chotila
- Chuda
- Darod
- Dasada
- Datha
- Dedarda
- Derdi-Janbai
- Devlia
- Dhola
- Dudhrej
- Gadhali
- Gadhoola
- Gamph
- Gandhol
- Iavej
- Itaria
- Jakhan
- Jalia Amaraji
- Jalia Manaji
- Jamar
- Jasdan
- Jaska
- Jhampodad
- Jhinjhuvada
- Juna Padar
- Kamadhia
- Kamalpur
- Kanjarda
- Kantharia
- Kariana
- Karmad
- Karol
- Katodia
- Kesria
- Khambhlav
- Khandia
- Kherali
- Khijadia
- Khijadia Dosaji
- Kotra Pitha
- Lakhtar
- Laliyad
- Lathi
- Limbda
- Matra Timba
- Mevasa
- Muli
- Munjpur
- Nilvala
- Pachhegam
- Pah
- Palali
- Paliyad
- Panchavada
- Patdi
- Rai-Sankli
- Rajpara
- Rajpur
- Ramanka
- Ramparda
- Randhia
- Ranigam
- Ratanpur Dhamanka
- Rohisala
- Samadhiala
- Samadhiala (Chabharia)
- Samadhiala (Charan)
- Samla
- Sahuka
- Sanala
- Sanosra
- Satanones
- Sayla
- Sejakpur
- Shevdivadar
- Songadh
- Sudamda-Dhandalpur
- Talsana
- Tavi
- Toda Todi
- Untdi
- Vadal
- Vadod
- Vala
- Vana
- Vanala
- Vangadhra
- Vanod
- Vavdi Dharvala
- Vavdi Vachhani
- Vijanones
- Vithalgadh
- Yankia

==== Former Western Kathiawar Agency ====
Salute states :

- Junagadh, title Nawab, Hereditary salute of 13-guns (15 local and personal)
- Nawanagar, title Maharaja Jam Rahib, Hereditary salute of 13-guns (15 local)
- Porbandar, title Maharaja Rana Rahib, Hereditary salute of 13-guns
- Gondal, title Maharaja, Hereditary salute of 11-guns
- Morvi, title Maharaja, Hereditary salute of 11-guns
- Wankaner, title Maharaja Raj Rahib, Hereditary salute of 11-guns
- Dhrol, title Thakore Sahib, Hereditary salute of 9-guns
- Rajkot, title Thakore Sahib, Hereditary salute of 9-guns

Non-salute states :

- Amrapur
- Bagasra
- Bantva
- Bantva Manavadar
- Bhadva
- Bhalgam Baldhoi
- Charkha
- Dahida
- Dedan
- Dholarva
- Drafa
- Gadhka
- Gadhia
- Garmali Moti
- Garmali Nani
- Gavridad
- Gigasaran
- Halaria
- Jalia Devani
- Jafarabad
- Jamka
- Jetpur
- Kaner
- Kanksiali
- Kanpar Ishwaria
- Kathrota
- Khijadia Najani
- Khirasra
- Kotda Nayani
- Kotda Sangan
- Kotharia
- Kuba
- Lakhapadar
- Lodhika
- Malia
- Manavav
- Mengni
- Monvel
- Mowa
- Mulila Deri
- Pal
- Rajpara
- Satodad Vavdi
- Shahpur
- Silana
- Sisang Chandli
- Vadali
- Vaghvadi
- Vekaria
- Vinchhavad
- Virpur-Kherdi
- Virvao
- Vasavad

==== former Banas Kantha Agency ====
===== Former Palanpur Agency =====
Salute states :

- Cutch, title Maharao, Hereditary salute of 17-guns (19-guns local)
- Palanpur, title Nawab, Hereditary salute of 13-guns (1933 transferred to Rajputana)
- Radhanpur, title Nawab, Hereditary salute of 11-guns

Non-salute states :

- Bhabbar
- Chadchat
- Deodar (Diyodar)
- Kankrej
- Kankrej thana
- Morwara
- Santalpur
- Suigaon
- Terwara
- Tharad
- Wao
- Warahi

===== Former Mahi Kantha Agency =====
Salute states

- First Class state : Idar, title (Maha)Raja, 15-guns, covering over half of the territory of the agency.
- Second Class state : Danta, title Maharana, 9-guns

Non-Salute states

- Third Class states
- Malpur
- Mansa
- Mohanpur
- ? Ranasan Town
- Fourth Class states
- Ambliara
- Ghodasar
- Ilol
- Katosan
- Khadal
- Pethapur
- Punadra
- Ranasan
- Sudasna
- Varsoda
- Fifth Class states
- Dabha
- Dadhalia
- Magodi
- Rupal
- Sathamba
- Tunadar
- Valasna
- Vasna (Wasna)
- Wadagam
- Sixth Class states
- Bhalusna
- Bolundra
- Dedhrota
- Derol
- Hadol
- Hapa
- Kadoli
- Khedwada
- Likhi
- Prempur
- Ramas
- Satlasna
- Tajpuri
- Vakhtapur
- Seventh Class states
- Deloli
- Gabat
- Ijpura
- Kasalpura
- Mahmadpura
- Palaj
- Rampura
- Ranipura
- Tejpura
- Timba
- Umri
- Virsoda

Lesser Estates

The agency included as well a large number of estates belonging to Kolis and/or Rajput, formerly feudatories of the Gaekwar Baroda; several of the states paid tribute to Baroda, and some, being classed as non-jurisdictional thalukdars, were under British administration.

== See also ==
- Attachment Scheme
- Bombay Presidency
- Political integration of India
