= Jhalawad (region) =

Region in Gujarat, India

Jhalawad ઝાલાવાડ
- Historical and cultural region
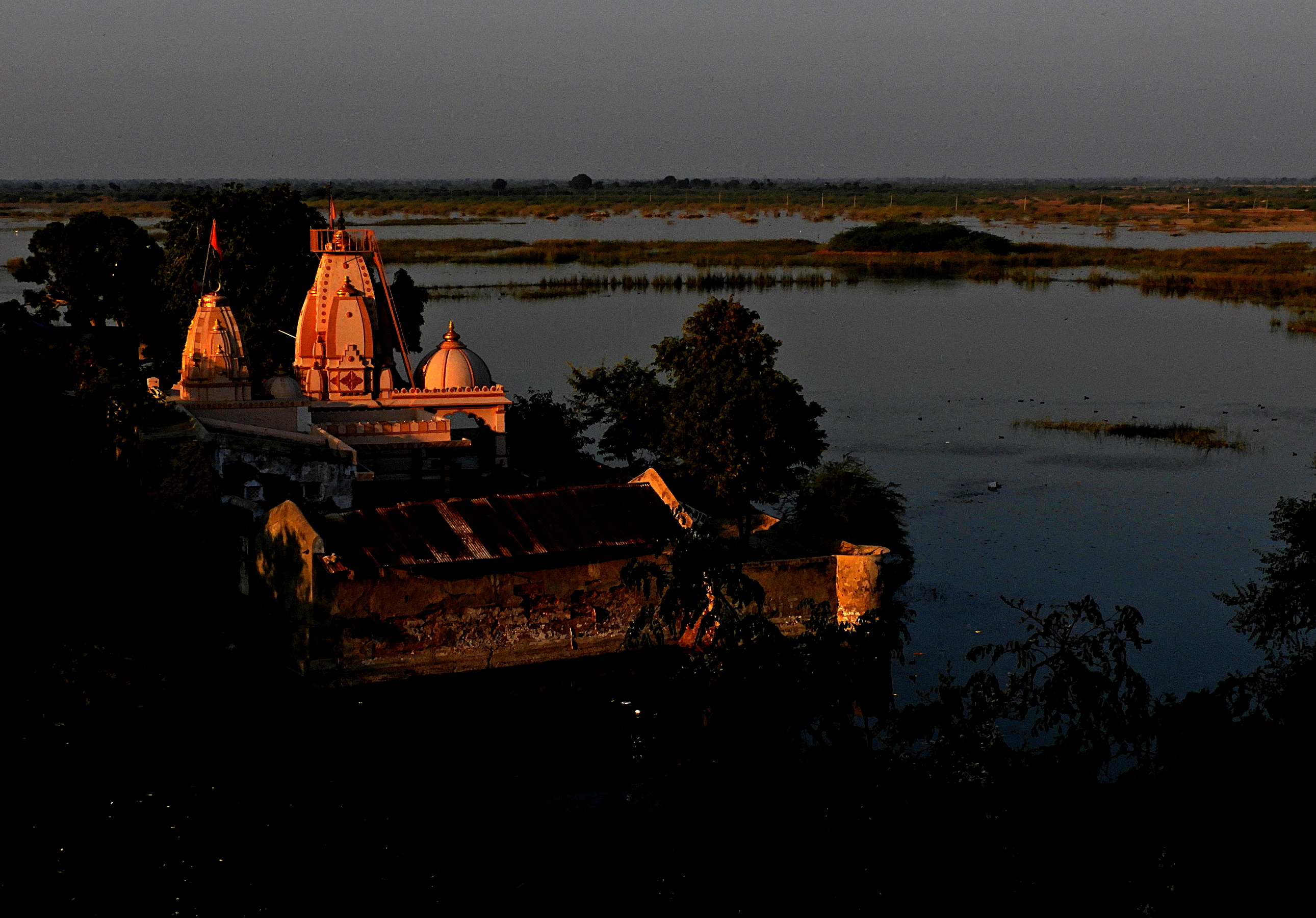
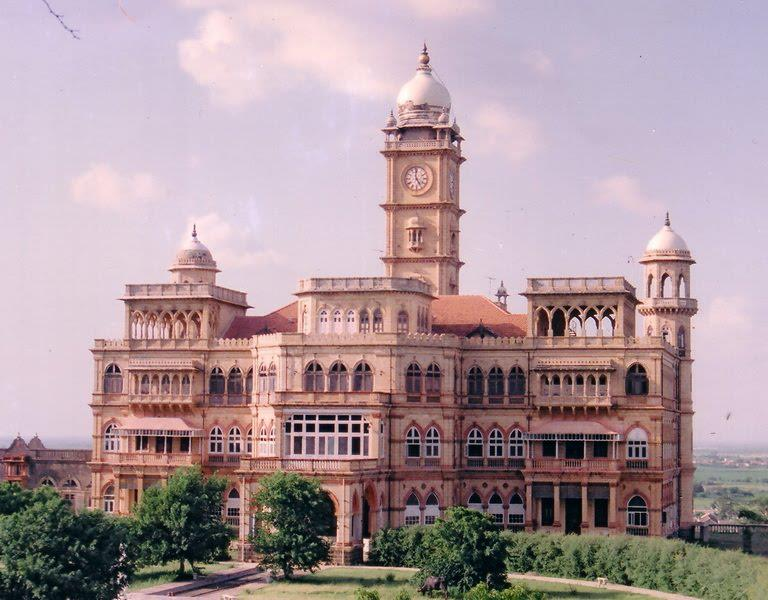
- Shakti Mata temple, Patdi Ranjit Vilas Palace, Wankaner

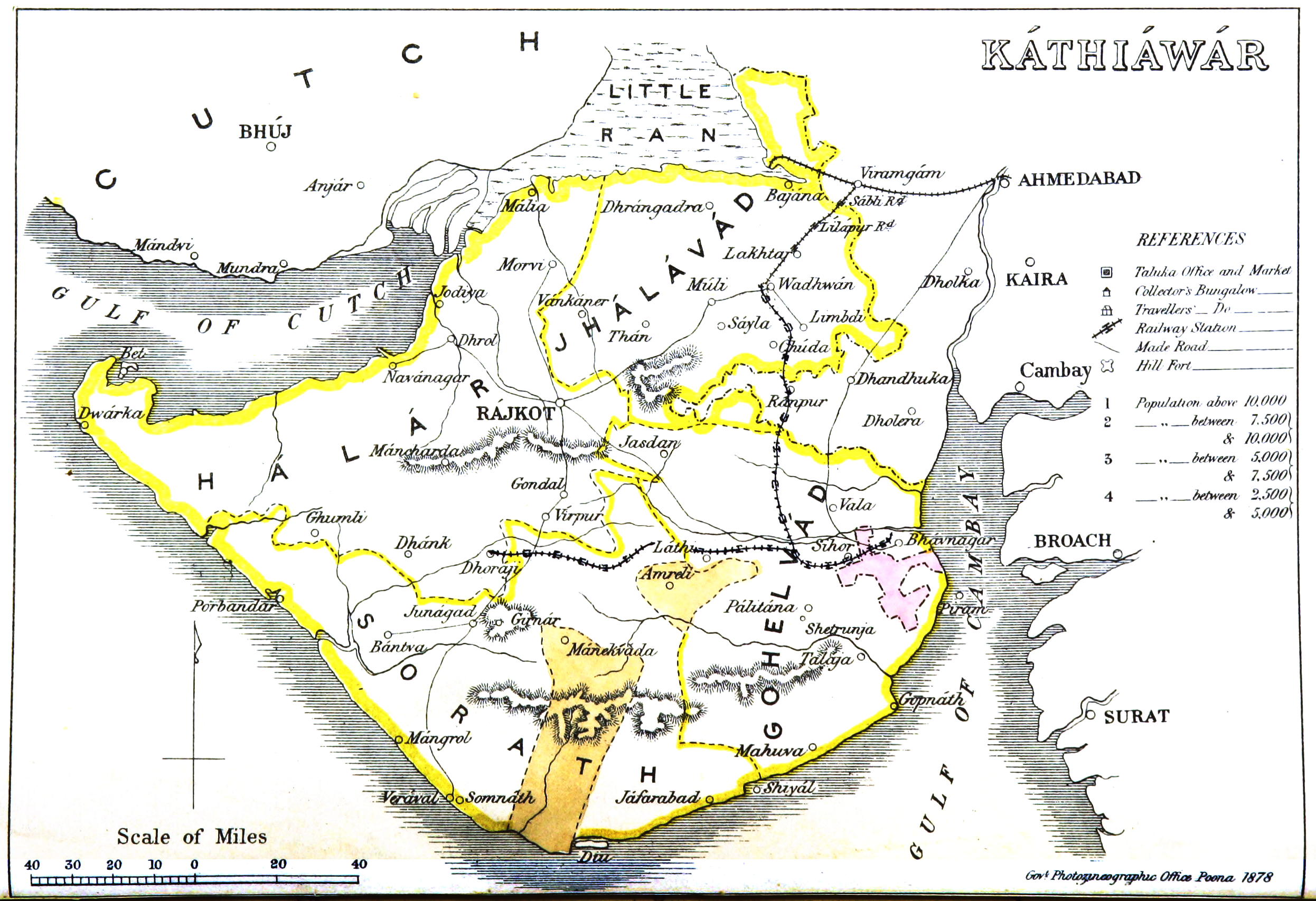
- Top: Jhalavad within Kathiawar; Bottom: Jhalawad prant in Kathiawar Agency, India
- Continent: Asia
- Country: India
- State: Gujarat
- Districts: Surendranagar, Morbi, Parts of Rajkot, Ahmedabad & Botad
- Named after: Jhala clan of Rajputs
- Regional Language or dialect: Jhalawadi (Gujarati)

Jhalawad, also spelled as Zalawad, is a historical region located in the middle of the Indian state of Gujarat and one of the 4 prants of Saurashtra. It includes the present-day districts of Surendranagar, Morbi and parts of Botad, Rajkot and Ahmedabad. It is named after the Jhala clan of Rajputs who ruled over this region for more than 1000 years.

== Princely states of Jhalawar Prant ==
Its salute states were :

- First Class :
  - Dhrangadhra state, title of Maharajadhiraj Maharana Sahib, hereditary salute of 13 guns (15 guns personal).
  - Wankaner state, title of Maharana Sahib, hereditary salute of 11 guns.
- Second Class :
  - Limbdi State, title Thakore Sahib, Hereditary salute of 9-guns.
  - Wadhwan State, title Maharana, Hereditary salute of 9-guns

Non-salute states :

- Third Class : Chuda State, Lakhtar State, Sayla State
- Fourth Class : Bajana State, Muli State, Patdi State
- Fifth Class : Vanod State
- Sixth Class : Anandpur, Bhoika, Chotila, Dasada, Rai-Sankli, Rakpur, Sanosra, Vadod State

Other petty states, often a single village: Ankevalia, Bamanbore, Bhadvana, Bhalala, Bhalgamda, Bharejda, Bhathan, Bhimora, Chachana, Chhalala, Chobari, Darod State, Devlia, Dudhrej, Gedi State, Gundiali, Jakhan State, Jamar State, Jhampodad, Jhinjhuvada, Kamalpur, Kantharia, Karmad, Karol State, Kesria, Khambhlav, Khandia, Kherali, Laliyad, Matra Timba, Mevasa, Munjpur, Palali State, Rajpur, Ramparda, Sahuka, Samla, Sejakpur, Sudamda-Dhandalpur, Talsana, Tavi State, Untdi, Vana State, Vanala, Vithalgadh, and Vadekhan Suryavash
