= Chok, Gujarat =

Village in Jesar Taluka of Bhavnagar district, Gujarat, India

Coordinates: 21.4264223°N 71.7306994°E

Chok is a village in Jesar Taluka of Bhavnagar district, Gujarat, India. It is a former petty Rajput princely state.

== History ==
Historically, Chok was one of many princely states in Gohelwar prant, under the colonial authority of the Eastern Kathiawar Agency, including a second village and ruled by Sarvaiya Rajput Chieftains. It was situated in the sab-division of the province known as Und Sarvaiya. It was the head-quarters of an Agency thana.

== Geography ==
It situated on the south bank of the river Shatrunji and is about ten miles south-south-west of Palitana.

Immediately opposite to Chok on the opposite side of the river is the Lonch hill, 1426 feet high, called in Jain literature Hastagiri. The Kamlo hill over Boda-no-nes is three miles distant to the south-east. It is called Kadambgiri in the Jain annals and is 1330 feet high and is surmounted by a small temple.

== Demographics ==
The population of which according to census of 1872 was 1163 and according to that of 1881 1264 souls. In 1901, it had population 1,213, yielding a state revenue of 6,800 Rupees (nearly all from land), paying a tribute of 417 Rupees, to the Gaekwar Baroda State and Junagadh State.
