= Chobari, Chotila =

Village in Surendranagar district, Gujarat, India

Coordinates: 22.2596111°N 71.2073611°E

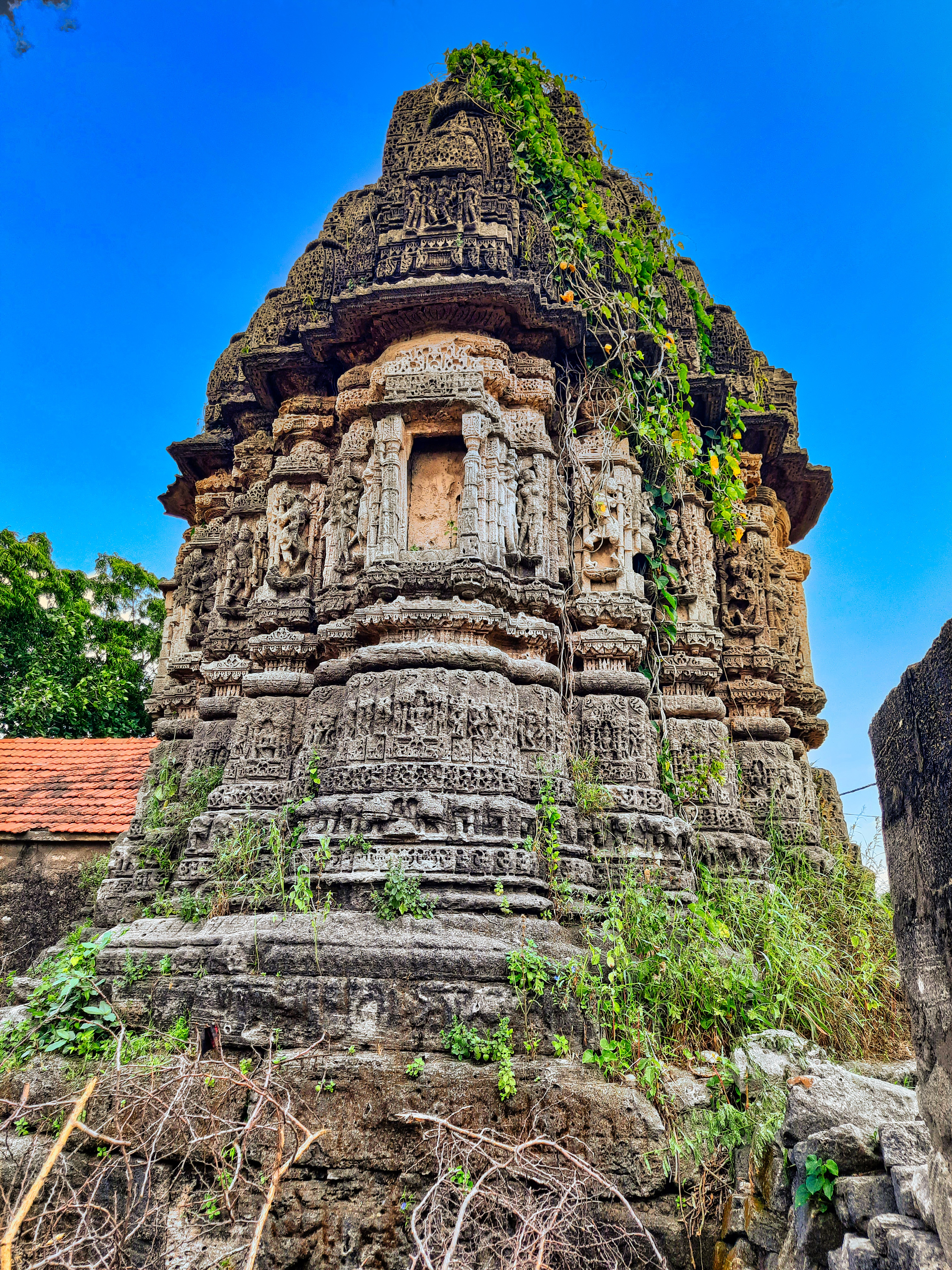
Ancient Hindu temple in the village

Chobari is a village in Chotila Taluka of Surendranagar district, Gujarat, India. It is a former princely state.

== History ==
Chobari was a separate tribute-paying taluka of Jhalawar prant, which during the British Raj was handled by the colonial Eastern Kathiawar Agency. It belonged to Kathis of the Khachar tribe and the Bhimora house. On their death without male issue the estate reverted to the house of Bhimora from which it sprung. It was, together with Bhimora, were subordinate to the Chotila thana. The names of the last Grasias of Chobari were Khachars Oghad and Jutha. It comprised two more villages and was ruled by a Kathi Chieftain.

== Demographics ==
It has a population in 1901 of 286, yielding a state revenue of 4,556 Rupees (1903-4, nearly all from land), paying a tribute of 199 Rupees, to the British and Sukhdi State. The population according to the census of 1872 was 296, and according to that of 1881 260 souls.

== Places of interest ==
There is a fine stepwell here called the Panchmukhi Vav or well with five entrances. There is also a tank and another fine stepwell.
