= Panchavada =

Village in Gujarat, India

Panchav(a)da is a village and former non-salute Rajput princely state on Saurashtra peninsula in Gujarat, western India.

== History ==
The petty princely state, in Gohelwar prant, was ruled by Sarvaiya Rajput Chieftains. In 1901 it comprised a single village, with a population of 287, yielding 1,700 Rupees state revenue (1903–4, mostly from land), paying 241 Rupees tribute, to the Gaikwar Baroda State and Junagadh State.

== Sources and external links ==
History

- Imperial Gazetteer, on DSAL.UChicago.edu - Kathiawar
