= Chitravav =

Village in Rajkot Taluka of Rajkot district, Gujarat, India

Coordinates: 22.1269088°N 70.9090853°E

The Chitravav (Divani) is a village in Rajkot Taluka of Rajkot district, Gujarat, India and former petty Rajput princely state.

== History ==
During the British Raj period, it was a separate-tribute paying estate under the Chamardi thana in Gohilwad prant, one of many under the colonial authority of the Eastern Kathiawar Agency. It is fifteen miles north-west of Chamardi and was held by Gohil Rajputs originally Bhayat of Bhavnagar State. The taluka consisted only of the single village.

The population according to the census of 1872 was 315 and according to that of 1881 321 souls. In 1901, it had a population of 246, yielding a state revenue of 2,200 Rupees (nearly all from land), paying a tribute of 529 Rupees, to the Gaekwad Baroda State and Junagadh State.

== Sources and external links ==
- Imperial Gazetteer on dsal.uchicago.edu - Kathiawar
- This article incorporates text from a publication now in the public domain: Gazetteer of the Bombay Presidency: Kathiawar. Vol. VIII. Printed at the Government Central Press, Bombay. 1884. p. 405.
