= Katodia =

Human settlement in Gujarat, India

Katodia is a village and former non-salute Rajput princely state on Saurashtra peninsula in Gujarat, western India.

== History ==
It was a single village princely state in Gohelwar prant, under Gohel Rajput Chieftains.

It had a population of 347 in 1901, yielding a state revenue of 3,000 Rupees (mostly from land; 1903–4) and paying 221 Rupees tribute to the Gaekwar Baroda State and Junagadh State. It was the lowliest of the princely states of the British Raj. The talukdar of Katodia got a privy purse of just Rs 192 which was the lowest among all the former princely state rulers.

During the British Raj, the petty state was under the colonial Eastern Kathiawar Agency.
