= Rohisala =

Village in Gujarat, India

Rohisala is a village on Saurashtra peninsula and former Rajput non-salute princely state in Gujarat, western India.

== History ==
Rohisala was a petty princely state, in the Gohelwar prant of Kathiawar, comprising only the village, ruled by Sarvaiya Rajput Chieftains.

It had a population of 411 in 1901, yielding a state revenue of 2,650 Rupees (1903–4, nearly all from land) and a paying a tribute of 111 Rupees, to the Gaekwar Baroda State and Junagarh State.

== Sources and external links ==
History

- Imperial Gazetteer, on dsal.uchicago.edu
