= Vankia =

Town in Gujarat, western India

Vankia is a town and former non-salute princely state in Gujarat, western India.

== History ==
Vankia was a Sixth Class princely state, in the Gohelwar prant of Kathiawar, also comprising two more villages, ruled by Kathi Chieftains.

It had a combined population of 947 in 1901, yielding a state revenue of 5,051 Rupees (1903–4, mostly from land) and a paying a tribute of 524 Rupees, to the British and Junagadh State.

== External links and Sources ==
- Imperial Gazetteer, on dsal.uchicago.edu
