= Khijadia =

Khijadia or variants may refer to the following places in Gujarat, India:

- Khijadiya, Amreli, a village
- Khijadia State, a town and former independent princely state
- Khijadiya Bird Sanctuary, in Jamnagar district

== See also ==
- Khijadia Dosaji, a village and former non-salute Rajput princely state
- Khijadia Najani, a village and former non-salute princely state
