= Kariana State =

Town in Gujarat, Western India

Kariana is a town and former non-salute princely state on Saurashtra peninsula, in Gujarat, western India.

== History ==
The Seventh Class princely state, in Gohelwar prant, was ruled by Kathi Chieftains. It comprised the town and eight more villages, with a combined population of 2,265 in 1901, yielding 20,000 Rupees state revenue (1903–4, mostly from land), paying 1,157 Rupees tribute, to the British and Junagadh State.
