= Jalia =

Jalia may refer to:

== Places in Gujarat, India ==
- Jalia Devani, a former Hindu Rajput non-salute princely state
- Jalia (Amreli), a village
- Jalia Amaraji, a village and former Rajput petty princely state
- Jalia Manaji, a village and former Rajput petty princely state

== Other uses ==
- JALIA, the Journal of the Australian Library and Information Association
- Jalia Kaibarta, an Indian caste
