= Vangadhra =

Human settlement in Gujarat, India

Vangadhra is a village and former Rajput non-salute princely state in Gujarat, western India.

== History ==
Vangadhra was a petty princely state, in the Gohelwar prant of Kathiawar, comprising only the village, ruled by Gohel Rajput Chieftains.

It had a population of 582 in 1901, yielding a state revenue of 2,400 Rupees (1903–4, nearly all from land) and a paying a tribute of 104 Rupees, to the Gaekwar Baroda State and Junagadh State.

== Sources and external links ==
- Imperial Gazetteer, on dsal.uchicago.edu
