= Ramanka =

Village in western India

Ramanka is a village and former salute Rajput princely state on Saurashtra Gujarat, western India.

== History ==
The petty princely state, in Gohilwar prant, was ruled by Gohil Rajput Chieftains. Ramanka was a taluk of Devani Gohil family. Ramanka was statuted in 1870 by Raol Shree Abhayrajsinghji Gohil, who was son of Raol Shree Devajibapu Gohil of Pacchegam. In 1901 it comprised a single village, with a population of 470, yielding 3,20,000 rupees state revenue (1903–4, nearly all from land), paying 672 rupees tribute, to the Gaikwar Baroda State and Junagadh State.
