= Jalia Amaraji =

Human settlement in Gujarat, India

Jalia Amaraji is a village and former Rajput petty princely state on Saurashtra peninsula, in Gujarat, Western India.

== History ==
The princely state, in Gohelwar prant, was ruled by Sarvaiya Rajput Chieftains. During the British Raj, it was in the charge of the colonial Eastern Kathiawar Agency.

It comprised only the single village, with a population of 444 in 1901, yielding 2,500 Rupees state revenue (1903–4, mostly from land), paying 136 Rupees tribute to the Junagadh State.

== Sources and external links ==
- Imperial Gazetteer, on DSAL.UChicago.edu - Kathiawar
