= Kanjarda =

Village in Gujarat, India

Kanjarda is a village and former non-salute Rajput princely state on Saurashtra peninsula in Gujarat, western India.

== History ==
It was a single village princely state in Gohelwar prant, under Sarvaiya Rajput Chieftains.

It had a population of 313 in 1901, yielding a state revenue of 1,600 Rupees (nearly all from land; 1903–4) and paying 128 Rupees tribute to the Gaekwar Baroda State.

During the British Raj, the petty state was under the colonial Eastern Kathiawar Agency.
