= Pah, Gujarat =

Village in Gujarat, India

Pah is a village and former non-salute Rajput princely state on Saurashtra peninsula in Gujarat, western India.

== History ==
Pah was a single village princely state in Gohelwar prant, under Sarvaiya Rajput Chieftains.

It had a population of 273 in 1901, yielding a state revenue of 2,600 Rupees (nearly all from land; 1903–4) and paying 319 Rupees tribute to the Gaekwar Baroda State and Junagadh.

During the British Raj, the petty state was under the colonial Eastern Kathiawar Agency.
