= Sanosra =

Human settlement in Gujarat, India

Sanosra is a village and former princely state on Saurashtra peninsula, in Gujarat state, western India.

== History ==
Sanosra was a Sixth Class princely state of Jhalawar prant, which during the British Raj was handled by the colonial Eastern Kathiawar Agency.

It also comprised two other villages and was ruled by a Kathi Chieftain. It had a combined population in 1901 of 667, yielding a state revenue of 4,4965 Rupees (1903–4, mostly from land), paying a tribute of 237 Rupees, to the British, Junagadh State and Sukhdi State.
