= Vadal, Gujarat =

Village and former princely state in India

Coordinates: 21.611°N 70.496°E

Vadal or Wadal is a village and petty former princely state Founded by Ahirs on Saurashtra peninsula in Gujarat, Western India.

== History ==
Luna and Jethsur, Ahirs of the Kamaliya clan, ruled as the Talukdars of Vadal State in 1896. During the British Raj, the petty state in Gohelwar prant was under the colonial Eastern Kathiawar Agency.
