= Nilvala =

Human settlement in Gujarat, India

Nilvala is a village and former non-salute princely state on Saurashtra peninsula in Gujarat, Western India.

== History ==
The petty princely state, in Gohelwar prant, was ruled by Kathi Chieftains.

In 1901 it comprised a single village, with a population of 457, yielding 3,735 Rupees state revenue (1903–4, mostly from land), paying 665 Rupees tribute to the British and to Junagadh State.

== External links and Sources ==
- Imperial Gazetteer, on DSAL.UChicago.edu - Kathiawar
