= Khijadia Dosaji =

Human settlement in Gujarat, India

Khijadia Dosaji is a village and former non-salute Rajput princely state on Saurashtra peninsula in Gujarat, western India.

== History ==
It was a single village princely state in Gohelwar prant, under Gohel Rajput Chieftains.

It had a population of 361 in 1901, yielding a state revenue of 2,600 Rupees (nearly all from land; 1903–4) and paying 427 Rupees tribute, to the Gaekwar Baroda State and Junagadh State.

During the British Raj, the petty state was under the colonial Eastern Kathiawar Agency.
