= Kanpar Ishwaria =

Town in Western India

Kanpar Ishwaria is a town and former non-salute princely state in Gujarat, Western India.

== History ==
Kanpar Ishwaria was a minor princely state, in the Halar prant of Kathiawar, also comprising a second village, ruled by Kathi Chieftains.

It had a combined population of 1,365 in 1901, yielding a state revenue of 16,135 Rupees (1903–4, nearly all from land) and a paying a tribute of 347 Rupees, to the British and Junagadh State.

== External links and Sources ==
- Imperial Gazetteer, on dsal.uchicago.edu
