= Samla =

Village in Saurashtra, Gujarat, India

Samla is a village and former Rajput princely state on Saurashtra peninsula, in Gujarat state, western India.

== History ==
Samla was one of the many petty princely states of Jhalawar prant, which during the British Raj was handled by the colonial Eastern Kathiawar Agency.

It comprised one other village and was ruled by a Jhala Rajput Chieftain. It had a population in 1901 of 961, yielding a state revenue of 8,000 Rupees (1903–4, solely from land), paying a tribute of 1,063 Rupees, to the British and Junagadh State.
