= Bhojavadar =

Village in Bhavnagar district, Gujarat, India

Coordinates: 21°51′N 71°43′E

Bhojavadar is a village and former Rajput princely state Umrala Taluka of Bhavnagar district, Gujarat, India.

== History ==
The petty tribute-paying Takuka under Songadh station thana in Gohelwar prant was ruled by Gohil Rajput Chieftains, Bhayad of Lathi State. It comprised only the village.

The population according to the census of 1872 was 1308 and according to that of 1881, 1107 souls. In 1901 it has a population of 764, yielding a state revenue of 5,300 Rupees (1903–4, nearly all from land), paying 550 Rupees tribute, to the Gaekwad of Baroda State and Junagadh State.
