= Manavav =

Village in Gujarat, India

Manavav is a village and former princely state on Saurashtra peninsula, in Gujarat, western India.

== History ==
Manavav was a petty princely state, comprising the sole village, in the Sorath prant of Western Kathiawar, ruled by Kathi Chieftains.

It had a population of 400 in 1901, yielding a state revenue of 4,100 Rupees (1903–4, nearly all from land) and paying a tribute of 172 Rupees, to the Gaekwar Baroda State and Junagadh State.

== External links and sources ==
- Imperial Gazetteer, on dsal.uchicago.edu
