= Shevdivadar =

Human settlement in Gujarat, India

Shevdivadar is a village in the Bhavnagar district of Gujarat in western India.

== History ==
Shevdivadar was a petty princely state, in the Gohelwar prant of Kathiawar, comprising only the single village.

It had a population of 177 in 1901, yielding a state revenue of 1,100 Rupees (1903–4, nearly all from land) and a paying a tribute of 60 Rupees, to the Gaekwar Baroda State and Junagadh State.

== Sources and external links ==
- Imperial Gazetteer, on dsal.uchicago.edu
