= Bhalgamda =

Village in Gujarat state, India

Bhalgamda is a village and former princely state on Saurashtra, Gujarat, India.

The village in Dhandhuka Taluka of Ahmedabad district is situated eight miles north-west of Bhoika and only two miles north of the Limbdi railway station.

== History ==
The petty princely state in Jhalawar prant was ruled by Kathi Chieftains. In 1901 it has a population of 1,588, yielding a state revenue of 8,000 Rupees (1903–04, 7,000 from land), paying 1,550 Rupees tribute, to the British and the Junagadh State.

During the colonial British Raj, it was a separate tribute-paying taluka under the Bhoika thana. The Garasias were Jhalas and were Bhayad of Limbdi State. The taluka consisted of three villages: Bhalgamda, and Chornia.

== External links and sources ==
- Imperial Gazetteer on dsal.uchicago.edu - Kathiawar
- This article incorporates text from a publication now in the public domain: Gazetteer of the Bombay Presidency: Kathiawar. Vol. VIII. Printed at the Government Central Press, Bombay. 1884. p. 382.
