= Gadhoola =

Village and former non-salute Rajput princely state

Gadhoola is a village and former non-salute Rajput princely state on Saurashtra peninsula in Gujarat, Western India.

== History ==
The petty princely state, in Gohelwar prant, was ruled by Gohel Rajput Chieftains.

In 1901 it comprised a single village, with a population of 366, yielding 3,000 Rupees state revenue (1903–4, mostly from land), paying 196 Rupees tribute, to the Gaikwar Baroda State and Junagadh State.

== Sources and external links ==
- Imperial Gazetteer, on DSAL.UChicago.edu - Kathiawar
