= Sahuka =

Village in Gujerat state, India

Coordinates: 25°17′N 83°37′E

Sahuka is a village and former Rajput princely state on Saurashtra peninsula, in Gujarat state, western India.

== History ==
Sahuka was one of the many petty princely states of Jhalawar prant, which during the British Raj was handled by the colonial Eastern Kathiawar Agency.

It comprised only the single village and was ruled by a Jhala Rajput Chieftain. It had a population in 1901 of 801, yielding a state revenue of 9,200 Rupees (1903–4, nearly all from land), paying a tribute of 584 Rupees, to the British and Junagadh State.
