= Iavej =

Town in Gujarat, India

Iavej is a town and former Rajput petty princely state on Saurashtra peninsula, in Gujarat, Western India.

== History ==
The petty princely state, in Gohelwar prant, was ruled by Sarvaiya Rajput Chieftains.

In 1901 it comprised two villages, with a population of 979, yielding 5,200 Rupees state revenue (1903–4, mostly from land), paying 290 Rupees tribute, to the Gaikwar Baroda State and to Junagadh State.
