= Bildi =

Village in Gujarat, India

Bildi is a village and former minor princely state on Saurashtra peninsula in Gujarat, western India.

The village lies at km 612 along the Mathura–Vadodara section railroad, between Morwani and Raoti (Madhya Pradesh).

== History ==
The petty princely state in Gohelwar prant was ruled by Sindi Chieftains. It also comprised only the villages.

In 1901 it has a population of 388, yielding a state revenue of 749 rupees (1903–4, nearly half from land), paying no tribute.
