= Jalia Manaji =

Human settlement in Gujarat, India

Jalia Manaji is a village and former Rajput petty princely state on Saurashtra peninsula, in Gujarat, Western India.

== History ==
The princely state, in Gohelwar prant, was ruled by Sarvaiya Rajput Chieftains. During the British Raj, it was in the charge of the colonial Eastern Kathiawar Agency.

It comprised only the single village, with a population of 236 in 1901, yielding 2,200 Rupees state revenue (1903–4, mostly from land), paying 31 Rupees tribute to the Gaekwar Baroda State.

== External links and sources ==
- Imperial Gazetteer, on DSAL.UChicago.edu - Kathiawar
