= Vekaria =

Vekaria may refer to the following :

== Place ==
- Vekaria State, a village and former princely state in Sorath prant, Kathiawar, Gujarat, western India

== People ==
- Nanjibhai Vekaria, Indian national MP for Indian National Congress, elected from Junagadh (Lok Sabha constituency), Gujarat
- Radhika Vekaria, British-Indian musician and composer
- Shivlal Vekaria, Indian national MP for Bharatiya Janata Party, elected from Rajkot (Lok Sabha constituency), Gujarat
- Tanmay Vekaria, Indian actor
