= Silana, Sorath =

Human settlement in Gujarat, India

Silana is a village and former princely state in Gujarat, western India.

== History ==
Silana was a minor princely state of Sorath prant, comprising only the sole village, which during the British Raj was handled by the colonial Eastern Kathiawar Agency.

It was ruled by a Kathi Chieftain. It had a population in 1901 of 774, yielding a state revenue of 6,250 Rupees (1903–4, nearly all from land), paying a tribute of 102 Rupees, to the Gaekwar Baroda State.
