= Vaghvadi =

Indian village and former princely state

Vaghvadi or Vaghvori is a village and former non-salute princely state in Gujarat, western India.

It lies in Sorath prant on Saurashtra peninsula.

== History ==
Vaghvadi was a petty princely state, comprising solely the village, ruled by Kathi Chieftains.

It had a population of 109 in 1901, yielding a state revenue of 1,450 Rupees (1903–4, nearly all from land) and a paying a tribute of 154 Rupees, to the Gaekwar Baroda State and Junagadh State.

== External links and Sources ==
History

- Imperial Gazetteer, on dsal.uchicago.edu - Kathiawar
