= Devlia =

Village in Gujarat, India

Devlia is a village and former non-salute Rajput princely state on Saurashtra peninsula in Gujarat, Western India.

== History ==
The petty princely state, in Jhalawar prant, was ruled by Jhala Rajput Chieftains.

In 1901 it comprised its seat town Devlia and one other village, with a combined population of 494, yielding 2,240 Rupees state revenue (1903–4, all from land), paying 523 tribute, to the British and to Junagarh State.
