= Darod (village) =

Village and former princely state in Gujarat, India

Darod is a village and former non-salute Rajput princely state on Saurashtra peninsula in Gujarat, Western India.

== History ==
The petty princely state, in Jhalawar prant, was ruled by Jhala Rajput Chieftains.

In 1901 it comprised a single village, with a population of 131, yielding 3,000 Rupees state revenue (1903–4, mostly from land), paying 416 tribute to the British and to Junagarh State.

== External links and Sources ==
History

- Imperial Gazetteer, on DSAL.UChicago.edu - Kathiawar
