= Toda Todi =

Indian village

Toda Todi is a village and former Rajput princely state on Saurashtra peninsula, in Gujarat, western India.

Toda and Todi villages lie in Sihor Taluka, Bhavnagar District.

== History ==
It was a petty princely state, comprising the sole pair of villages, in the Gohilwar prant of Western Kathiawar, ruled by Gohil Rajput Chieftains.

It had a combined population of 380 in 1901, yielding a state revenue of 3,800 Rupees (1903–4, nearly all from land) and paying a tribute of 175 Rupees, to the Gaekwar Baroda State and Junagadh State.
