= Tavi State =

Human settlement in Gujarat, India

Tavi is a village and former Rajput princely state on Saurashtra peninsula, in Gujarat, western India.

== History ==
It was a petty princely state, comprising the sole village, in the Jhalawar prant of Eastern Kathiawar, ruled by Jhala Rajput Chieftains.

It had a population of 509 in 1901, yielding a state revenue of 2,000 Rupees (1903–4, all from land) and paying a tribute of 335 Rupees, to the British and Junagadh State.
