= Sejakpur =

Sejakpur may refer to the following places in Gujarat, western India :

- Sejakpur, Jhalawar, a village and former minor princely state
- present Ranpur, founded in 1194 as first capital of the Gohil Rajput Bhavnagar State
