= Lakhapadar =

Human settlement in Gujarat, India

Coordinates: 21.3000°N 71.1667°E

Lakhapadar is a village and former non-salute princely state on the Saurashtra peninsula in Gujarat, western India.

According to Census 2011 information the location code or village code of Lakhapadar village is 515721. Lakhapadar village is located in Dhari Tehsil of Amreli district in Gujarat, India. It is situated 22 km away from sub-district headquarter Dhari and 37 km away from district headquarter Amreli. As per 2009 stats, Lakhapadar village is also a gram panchayat.

The total geographical area of village is 1596.31 hectares. Lakhapadar has a total population of 1,243 peoples. There are about 255 houses in Lakhapadar village. Savar Kundla is nearest town to Lakhapadar which is approximately 37 km away.

Population of Lakhapadar

Total Population: 1243 Male Population : 616 Female Population : 627

Connectivity of Lakhapadar

Type Status Public Bus Service Available within village Private Bus Service Available within 10+ km distance Railway Station Available within 10+ km distance

Nearby villages of Lakhapadar:

Gigasan

Kubda

Amaratpur

Devla

Nagadhra

Virpur

Madhupur

Dabhali

Jira

Sarasiya

Facharia

Visiting places in Lakhapadar

- Gaumukhi Ganga
- Temple of Hanumanji on river front of Shel.
- Budheshwer Mahadev temple on Triveni river
- Lakhapadar Dam
- Gatrad mataji Temple

== History ==
The petty princely state, in Sorath prant, was ruled by Kathi Chieftains.

In 1901 it comprised only the village, with a population of 544, yielding 3,900 Rupees state revenue (1903–4, mostly from land), paying 178 Rupees tribute to the Gaekwar Baroda State and Junagadh State.

To know more history : please read book of '''Zaverchand Megahni's''' book ''' SAURASHTRA NI RASDHAR, History of Hirbai...

== External links and sources ==
- Imperial Gazetteer, on DSAL.UChicago.edu - Kathiawar
