= Silana =

Silana may refer:

- Silana (beetle), a genus of insects in the family Chrysomelidae
- Silana (Thessaly), a town in ancient Histiaeotis, Thessaly, Greece
- Silana, Sorath, a village and former princely state in Kathiawar, Gujarat, India
- Silana, Sonipat, a village in Haryana, India
