= Dedan =

Dedan may refer to:

- Dedan, an ancient Arabian city-state located in the oasis of al-ʿUla
  - for the city, the kingdom in its later phase, and the biblical characters, see Lihyan
- Dedan State, a former princely state in Gujarat, western India
- Dedan Kimathi (1920–1957), a leader of the Kenyan Mau Mau revolt
- Dedan Thomas Jr. (born 2005), American college basketball player
- Dedan, a major antagonist of the independent video game Off.
