= Halaria =

Human settlement in Gujarat, India

Halaria is a town and former Rajput non-salute princely state on Saurashtra peninsula, in Gujarat, Western India.

== History ==
The petty princely state, in Sorath prant, was ruled by Kathi Chieftains.

It comprised four villages, with a population of 1,268 in 1901, yielding 12,500 Rupees state revenue (1903–04, mostly from land), paying 179 Rupees tribute, to the Gaikwar Baroda State and Junagadh State.
