= Dahida =

Village in Gujarat state, India

Coordinates: 21.686°N 71.144°E

Dahida is a village in Dhari Taluka of Amreli district, Gujarat, India. It is a former non-salute princely state.

== History ==
The separate tribute-paying princely state under Lakhapadar thana in Sorath prant was ruled by Vala Kathi chieftains.

In 1901 it comprised three villages, with a combined population of 915, yielding 13,500 Rupees state revenue (1903–4, nearly all from land), but paying no tribute.

The population was 491 according to the census of 1872 and 770 according to that of 1881.
