= Satanones =

Former princely state on Saurashtra peninsula in Gujarat, India

Satanones is a petty former Ahir princely state on Saurashtra peninsula in Gujarat, Western India.

== History ==
Satanones was a princely state controlled by Ahir chieftains.

Kamaliya Natha was proprietor in who paid tribute

During the British Raj, the petty state in Gohelwar prant was under the colonial Eastern Kathiawar Agency.
