= Chachana =

Village and former Rajput princely state in Chuda Taluka, Gujarat, India

Chachana, Chanchana or Cacana is a village and former Rajput princely state in Chuda Taluka of Surendranagar district, on the Saurashtra peninsula in Gujarat, India.

== History ==
The petty princely state, comprising only the single village in Jhalawar prant (Eastern Kathiawar), was ruled by Jhala Rajput Chieftains and Bhayad of Limbdi State. It was under Bhoika thana.

The population according to the census of 1872 was 783 and according to that of 1881, 782 souls.

In 1901 it had a population of 459, yielding 5,000 Rupees state revenue (1903–4, all from land), paying 318 Rupees tribute to the British.

== Sources and external links ==
- Imperial Gazetteer2 of India, Volume 15, page 168 - on Digital South Asia Library
- This article incorporates text from a publication now in the public domain: Gazetteer of the Bombay Presidency: Kathiawar. Vol. VIII. Printed at the Government Central Press, Bombay. 1884. pp. 402–403.
