= Sejakpur, Jhalawar =

Village in Gujarat, India

Sejakpur is a village and former princely state on Saurashtra peninsula, in Gujarat state, western India.

== History ==
Sejakpur was one of the many petty princely states of Jhalawar prant, which during the British Raj was handled by the colonial Eastern Kathiawar Agency.

It comprised two three villages and was ruled by a Kathi Chieftain. It had a population in 1901 of 864, yielding a state revenue of 3,600 Rupees (1903–4, over half from land), paying a tribute of 433 Rupees, to the British and Junagadh State.
