= Vadali State =

Human settlement in Gujarat, India

Vadali is a village and former Rajput non-salute princely state on Saurashtra peninsula in Gujarat, western India.

== History ==
Vadali was a Seventh Class princely state, comprising only the village, in the Halar prant of Western Kathiawar, ruled by Jadeja Rajput Chieftains.

It had a population of 409 in 1901, yielding a state revenue of 6,435 Rupees (1903–4, mostly from land) and a paying a tribute of 324 Rupees, to the British and Junagadh State.

== External links and Sources ==
History

- Imperial Gazetteer, on dsal.uchicago.edu
