= Kanksiali =

Human settlement in Gujarat, India

Kangshiyadi is a village and former Rajput non-salute princely state in Gujarat, Western India.

== History ==
Kangshiyadi was a petty princely state comprising only the village, in the Halar prant of Kathiawar, ruled by Jadeja Rajput Chieftains.

It had a population of 224 in 1901, yielding a state revenue of 2,538 Rupees (1903–1904, mostly from land) and paying a tribute of 111 Rupees, to the British and Junagadh State.

== Sources and external links ==
- Imperial Gazetteer of India, v. 15, p. 167
