= Randia =

Randia can refer to the following creatures :

- Randia (bird), a monotypic genus of bird containing a single species, Randia pseudozosterops, also known as Rand's warbler
- Randia (plant), a genus of plants of the family Rubiaceae

== See also ==
- Randhia, a village and former princely state in Kathiawar, Gujarat, India
