= Gabat =

Gabat or GABAT may refer to the following :

Places

- Gabat, Pyrénées-Atlantiques, commune in SW France
- Gabat State, a former princely state in Mahi Kantha, Gujarat, India
- Gabat village, in Bayad Taluka of Sabarkantha District, Gujarat, seat of the above state

Other

- GABAT, mitochondrial γ-aminobutyric acid transaminase
