= Bharejda =

Village in Gujarat state, India

Bharejda or Bhanejda, also corrupted to Bharejra, is a village and former princely state, now in Chuda Taluka of Surendranagar district in Gujarat, western India.

== History ==
Bharejda, a minor princely state of Jhalawar prant, which during the British Raj was handled by the colonial Eastern Kathiawar Agency, comprised only the sole village.

Bhanejda literally means village of the Sister's Son, so called because this village was given from the Kathi-state (Sudamda-)Dhandhalpur to the Chieftain's nephew, a fellow Kathi caste of the sub-tribe of Bhambhla, by whose descendants it is held till British period.

It was ruled by a Kathi Chieftain. It had a population in 1901 of 421, yielding a state revenue of 1,702 Rupees (1903–04, mostly from land), paying a tribute of 126 Rupees, to the British and the Sukhdi State.

== External links and sources ==
- Imperial Gazetteer on DSAL - Kathiawar
