= Bhadli =

Village in Gujarat state, India

Bhadli is a village and former princely state on Saurashtra peninsula in Gujarat, western India.

== Village ==
Bhadli lies in Jasdan Taluka of Rajkot district. It is situated on a tributary of the Ghelo river.

== History ==
Bhadli was a fourth Class non-salute state in the Gohelwar prant of Kathiawar, ruled by Kathi Rajputs. It comprised 24 villages, with a population of 2,988 in 1901, yielding a state revenue of 16,000 Rupees (mainly from land) and paying a tribute of 1,357 Rupees, to the British agency.

It was originally a well known holding of a Chudasama Bhayad of Junagadh, from whom it was conquered in the eighteenth century by the Khachar Kathis, who held it till British period. Most of the Chudasama houses of Gujarat and the Bhal region derive their origin from the Raos (princely chieftains) of Bhadli. Bhadli was subordinate to the Babra thana during British period. Bhan Khachar of Bhadli was a noted freebooter of the later end of the eighteenth century.

== External links and Sources ==
- Imperial Gazetteer, on DSAL.UChicago.edu - Kathiawar
- This article incorporates text from a publication now in the public domain: Gazetteer of the Bombay Presidency: Kathiawar. Vol. VIII. Printed at the Government Central Press, Bombay. 1884. pp. 379–380.
