= Chhalala =

Village in Chuda Taluka of Surendranagar district, Gujarat, India

Coordinates: 22.4189728°N 71.802864°E

Chhalala is a village in Chuda Taluka of Surendranagar district, Gujarat, India. It was formerly Rajput princely state.

== History ==
The separate tribute-paying princely state, comprising only the single village in Jhalawar prant (Eastern Kathiawar), was ruled by Jhala Rajput chieftains of Limbdi family. It was subordinate to the Bhoika thana. In 1901 it had a population of 557, yielding 5,017 Rupees state revenue (1903–4, mostly from land), paying 1,122 Rupees tribute, to the British, Junagadh State and Sukhdi State.

== Demographics ==
The population according to the census of 1872 was 863 and according to that of 1881 800 souls.
