= Jamar, Gujarat =

Human settlement in India

Jamar is a village and former Rajput petty princely state on Saurashtra peninsula, in Gujarat, western India.

== History ==
The princely state, in Jhalawar prant, was ruled by Jhala Rajputs.

In 1901 it comprised only a single village, with a population of 289, yielding 3960 Rupees state revenue (1903–4, all from land), paying 288 Rupees tribute, to the British.
