= Kathrota =

Village in India

Coordinates: 21.6269°N 70.5306°E

Kathrota is a village and former non-salute princely state on Saurashtra peninsula in Gujarat, Western India.

== History ==
The petty princely state, in Sorath prant, was ruled by Kathi Chieftains.

In 1901 it comprised a single village, with a population of 138, yielding 2,300 Rupees state revenue (1903–4, nearly all from land), paying 52 Rupees tribute to the Gaikwar Baroda State.

== External links and Sources ==
- Imperial Gazetteer, on DSAL.UChicago.edu - Kathiawar
