= Kotra Pitha =

Human settlement in Gujarat, India

Kotra Pitha is a town and former non-salute princely state on Saurashtra peninsula, in Gujarat, western India.

== History ==
The Sixth Class princely state, in Sorath prant, was ruled by Kathi Bhanwala Dadawala Saheb. It comprised the town and twelve more villages, with a combined population of 6,772 in 1901, yielding 70,000 Rupees state revenue (1903–4, over half from land), paying 5,578 Rupees tribute, to the British and Junagadh State.

== External links and sources ==
History

- Imperial Gazetteer, on DSAL.UChicago.edu - Kathiawar
