= Pachhegam =

Village in Gujarat, India

Pachhegam (Devani) is a village and former non-salute Rajput princely state on Saurashtra peninsula in Gujarat, western India.

== History ==
The minor princely state, in Gohilwar prant, was ruled by Gohil Rajput Chieftains. In 1901 it comprised the town and two more villages.

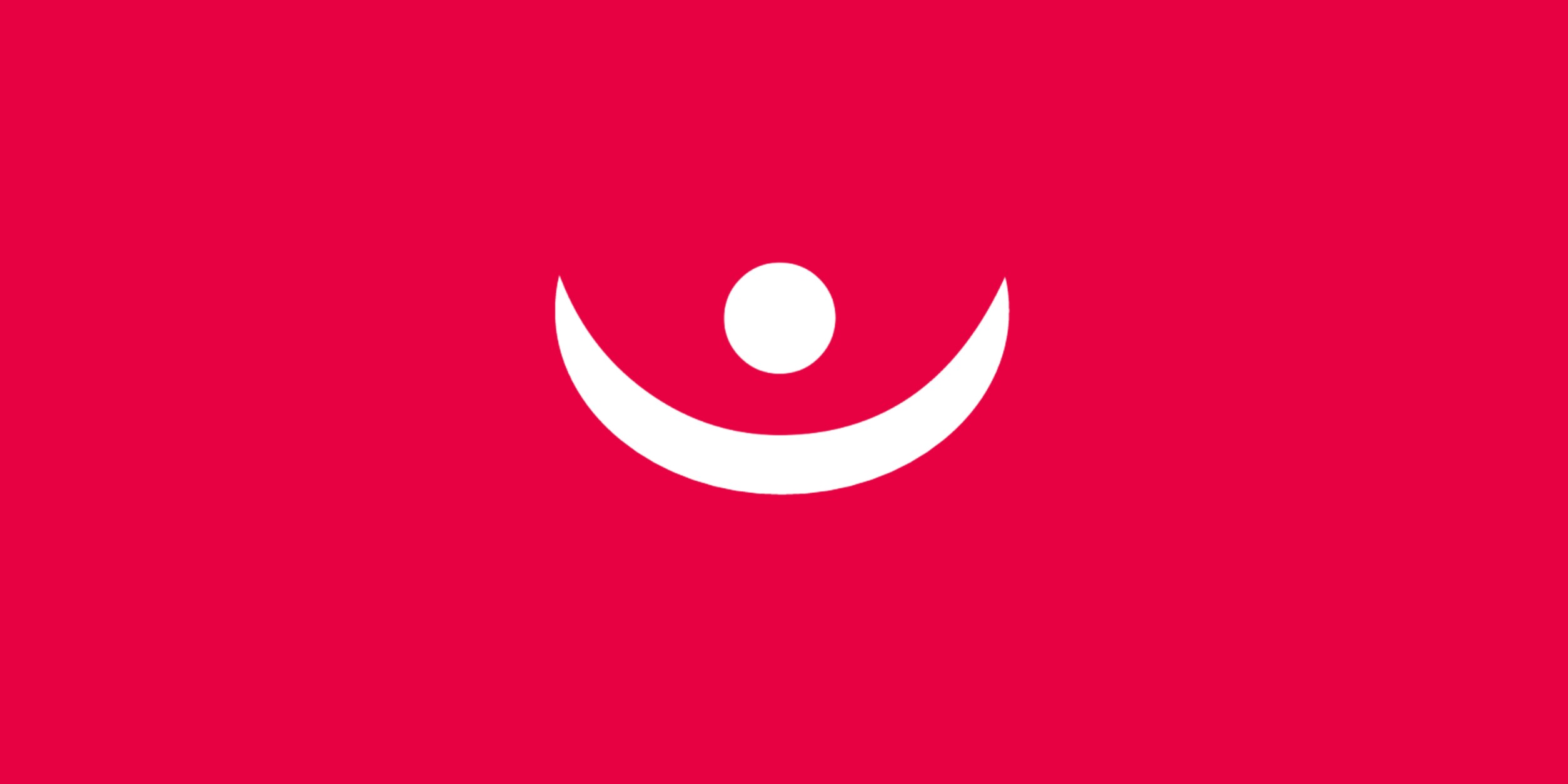
an article of Arjun Sinh Jadeja (Makaji Meghpar)

Previously Pachhegam was known as Paschim gram then after it became Pachhegam. Previously Gohil Rajput and Prashnora Nagar Bhahmins community were living in this small village. And this village was also knownas a Hub of Ayurvedic Treatment..there were a senitorium for Patients who were getting treatment for various diseases. There were many Vaidya -Ayurvedic Doctors provides the best treatment to there Patients.
