= Gadhka =

Human settlement in Gujarat, India

Gadhka is a village and formerly the seat of a Rajput taluka and minor princely state, named after the village, in Western Saurashtra, presently in western India's state Gujarat.

The village is one of many in the modern Rajkot Taluka of Rajkot rural legislative constituency, in Morbi district.

== History ==
The princely state was created as an offshoot of the Rajput Jadeja dynasty's Rajkot state for Thakur Ranmalji's second son, the first Thakur Saheb, on whose son and successor's childless death it was combined with Ranmaji's third son Akherajji's formerly received estate Makhawad.

Gadkhka State comprised five villages, covering 60 square kilometers, with a population of 1,908 in 1921.

During the British Raj, it was a Fifth Class State in Halar prant, under the colonial Western Kathiawar Agency. Its jurisdictional powers were: Criminal, two years rigorous imprisonment and fines up to 2,000Rs, and Civil - to the extent of 5,000Rs.

== Ruling Thakurs ==
- Thakore Saheb Vajerajji Ranmalji, son of Thakur Ranmalji of Rajkot
- Thakore Saheb Kanjibhai Vajerajji, son of the above, childless
- Thakore Saheb Akherajji Ranmalji, uncle of the above, son of Ranmalji
- Thakore Saheb Waghjibhi Akherajji, son of the above
- Thakore Saheb Bhanjibhi Waghjibhi, son of the above
- Thakore Saheb Govindsinhji Bhanjibhi, son of the above, died 1870
- Thakore Saheb Shivsinhji Govindsinhji, son of the above, born 26 November 1868, succeeded 26 November 1870
- Thakore Saheb Lagdhirsinhji Harisinhji, born 27 September 1910, son of Harisinhji Shivsinhji, the late son of the above
- Thakore Saheb Ghagendrasinhji Laghdirsinhji, son of the above
- Thakore Saheb Omkarsinhji Ghagendrasinhji, son of the above
