= Vekaria State =

Human settlement in Gujarat, India

Vekaria is a village and former non-salute princely state on Saurashtra peninsula in Gujarat, western India.

== History ==
Vekaria was a petty princely state in Sorath prant in Western Kathiawar, comprising solely the village, ruled by Kathi Chieftains.

It had a population of 595 in 1901, yielding a state revenue of 6,105 Rupees (1903–4, nearly all from land) and paying a tribute of 55 Rupees, to the Gaekwar Baroda State.

== External links and Sources ==
History

- Imperial Gazetteer, on dsal.uchicago.edu - Kathiawar
