= Jalia Devani =

Human settlement in Gujarat, India

Jalia Devani (Hindi जलिया देवानी) is a former Rajput non-salute princely state on Saurashtra peninsula, in Gujarat, Western India.

== History ==
The princely state, in Halar prant, was ruled by Jadeja Rajputs. It comprised 10 villages, covering 36 square miles (93 km^{2}), with a population of 2,444 in 1901 (2,688 in 1921), yielding 16,230 Rupees state revenue (1903–4, mostly from land; later 17.000), paying 1,525 Rupees tribute to the Gaekwar Baroda State. During the British Raj, it was a Fifth Class state, in the charge of the colonial Eastern Kathiawar Agency. The Jurisdictional competence of the Taluka were limited in civil cases to 5,000 Rupees, in criminal matters to two years of rigorous imprisonment and fines up to 2,000 Rupees.

It ceased to exist on 15 February 1948 by accession to Saurashtra State (later merged into Bombay State, now part of Gujarat).

== Ruling Thakore Sahebs ==
Succession was by primogeniture, kinship details unavailable.

- Thakore Saheb RAVAJI Bamanioji, 1st Thakore Saheb of Jalia Devani 1612/-
- Thakore Saheb DUNGERJI Ravaji, 2nd Thakore Saheb
- Thakore Saheb KAYAJI Dungerji I, 3rd Thakore Saheb
- Thakore Saheb RANMALJI Kayaji I, 4th Thakore Saheb
- Thakore Saheb DEVAJI Ranmaji, 5th Thakore Saheb
- Thakore Saheb KAYAJI Devaji II, 6th Thakore Saheb
- Thakore Saheb RANMALJI Kayaji II, 7th Thakore Saheb
- Thakore Saheb MODJI Ranmalji, 8th Thakore Saheb
- Thakore Saheb JASAJI Modji, 9th Thakore Saheb
- Thakore Saheb KAYAJI Jasaji III, 10th Thakore Saheb
- Thakore Saheb HALAJI Kayaji, 11th Thakore Saheb till 1868
- Thakore Saheb MANSINHJI Halaji, 12th Thakore Saheb, born 1852, succeeded 31 December 1868.
- Thakore Saheb SURSINHJI Mansinjhi, 13th Thakore Saheb
- Thakore Saheb BHOJRAJJI Sursinjhi, 14th Thakore Saheb -/1919
- Thakore Saheb MOHABATSINHJI Bhojrajji, 15th Thakore Saheb of Jalia Devani, born 6 August 1910, succeeded 26 October 1919, married and had issue, last ruler till 1948, died 13 February 1955.

The dynastic line is nominally continued.

== External links and sources ==
- Imperial Gazetteer, on DSAL.UChicago.edu - Kathiawar
- [Indian Rajputs, with Genealogy and Google map]
- Indian princely States on www.uq.net.au, as archived on web.archive.org, with Genealogy
