= Veja State =

Princely state in Gujarat, India

Veja State was a petty princely state in India's present state of Gujarat.

== History ==
During the British Raj, it fell under the Baroda Agency, until its 1937 merger into the Baroda and Gujarat States Agency.

== See also ==
- Vejanoness (synonym or fellow state?)
