= Gundiali =

Human settlement in Gujarat, India

Gundiali is a village and former non-salute princely state on Saurashtra peninsula in Gujarat, Western India.

== History ==
The minor princely state, in Jhalawar prant, was ruled by Jhala Rajput Chieftains. In 1901 it comprised two villages, with a population of 1,465, yielding 17,655 Rupees state revenue (1903–4, mostly from land), paying 1,408 Rupees tribute to the British.

== See also ==
- Gundiyali, village in Kutch, Gujarat

== Sources and external links ==
- Imperial Gazetteer, on DSAL.UChicago.edu - Kathiawar
