= Untdi =

Village in Gujarat, India

Untdi is a village and former non-salute Rajput princely state on Saurashtra peninsula in Gujarat, Western India.

== History ==
The petty princely state, in Jhalawar prant, was ruled by Jhala Rajput Chieftains.

In 1901 it comprised a single village, with a population of 240, yielding 2,000 Rupees state revenue (1903–4, half from land), paying 539 Rupees tribute to the British and the Junagadh State.

== External links and Sources ==
History

- Imperial Gazetteer, on DSAL.UChicago.edu - Kathiawar
