= Gandhol =

Huiman settlement in Gujarat, India

Gandhol is a village and former non-salute princely state on Saurashtra peninsula in Gujarat, Western India.

== History ==
The petty princely state, prant, was ruled by Chieftains. In 1901 it comprised a single village, with a population of 137, yielding 2,000 Rupees state revenue (1903–4, mostly from land), paying 111 Rupees tribute, to the Bhavnagar

== Sources and external links ==
- Imperial Gazetteer, on DSAL.UChicago.edu - Kathiawar
