= Kaner State =

Human settlement in Gujarat, India

Kaner is a village and former non-salute princely state on Saurashtra peninsula in Gujarat, western India.

== History ==
The petty princely state, in Sorath prant, was ruled by Kathi Chieftains.

In 1901 it comprised a single village, with a population of 261, yielding 2,400 Rupees state revenue (1903–4, nearly all from land), paying 195 tribute to the Gaikwar Baroda State.

== See also ==
- Danish Kaneria

== External links and Sources ==
History

- Imperial Gazetteer, on DSAL.UChicago.edu - Kathiawar
