= Bodanones =

Human settlement in Gujarat, India

Bodanones is a village on Saurashtra peninsula in Gujarat, Western India.

== History ==
Bodanones was a village controlled by Ahirs chieftain.

Boda no ness was one of the princely states ruled by Ahirs

During the British Raj, the petty state in Gohelwar prant was under the colonial Eastern Kathiawar Agency.

== External links and sources ==
- DSAL.UChicago - Kathiawar

Specific
