= Laliyad =

Indian village and former princely state

Laliyad (or Laliad) is a village and former non-salute Rajput princely state on the Saurashtra peninsula in Gujarat, western India.

== History ==
The petty princely state, in Jhalawar prant, was ruled by Jhala Rajput Chieftains. In 1901 it comprised only the village, with a population of 755, yielding 6,000 Rupees state revenue (1903–4, only from land), paying 362 Rupees tribute, to the British.
