= Bhathan =

Village in India

Bhathan is a village and former princely state in Limbdi Taluka of Surendranagar District, Gujarat, India.

The village is in Dasada (Vidhan Sabha constituency).

== History ==
The tribute-paying state in Jhalawar prant, comprising only the village, was ruled by Jhala Rajput Chieftains.

In 1901, it had a population of 405, yielding a state revenue of 1,800 Rupees (1903–4, mostly from land) and paying a tribute of 701 Rupees, to the British and to Junagadh State.
