= Khijadia State =

Human settlement in Gujarat, India

Khijadija is a town and former independent princely state on Saurashtra, Gujarat, western India. It is apparently identical to Vala Shri Valera Raning alias Vala XIX, one of many fragmented parts of Vala State.

== History ==
Khijadija was a princely state that evolved from Jetpur state and developed independent powers and revenue collection of its own. After independence it enjoyed a privy Purse (payment made to former royal family of erstwhile princely states) of 40,000 rupees annually. During the British Raj, the state was under the colonial Eastern Kathiawar Agency.
