= Matra Timba =

Human settlement in Gujarat, India

Matra Timba is a village and former princely state on Saurashtra peninsula in Gujarat, western India.

== History ==
The minor princely state in Jhalawar prant, ruled by Kathi Chieftains, comprised the single village. It had a population of 352 in 1901, yielding a state revenue of 2,727 Rupees (1903–4, mostly from land) and a paying a tribute of 362 Rupees, to the British and Junagadh State.

== External links and sources ==
History

- Imperial Gazetteer, on dsal.uchicago.edu
