= Khandia =

Human settlement in Gujarat, India

Khandia is a village and former petty Rajput princely state on Saurashtra peninsula in Gujarat, western India.

== History ==
The non-salute princely state in Jhalawar prant was ruled by Jhala Rajput Chieftains. It comprised only the village.

In 1901 it has a population of 627, yielding a state revenue of 4,000 Rupees (1903–4, only from land), paying a 900 Rupees tribute to the British, Junagarh State and Sukhdi State.

== Sources and external links ==
- Imperial Gazetteer on dsal.uchicago.edu - Kathiawar
