= Charkha (Dhari, Gujarat) =

Village in Gujarat state, India

Coordinates: 21.877°N 71.243°E

Charkha is one of 11 villages in Dhari Taluka and one of 616 in the Amreli district, And formerly a princely state of the Saurashtra peninsula in the Indian state of Gujarat. which are associated with wala Kathi people

== Demographics ==
According to the 1881 and 1872 censuses, the population of Charkha decreased from 1,613 to 1,414. Charkha village has a population of 677 people in about 179 houses, according to Census 2011.
