= Vinchhavad =

Village in Gujarat, India

Vinchhavad is a village and former non-salute princely state on Saurashtra peninsula in Gujarat, western India.

== History ==
Vinchhavad, a minor princely state in Sorath prant, ranking as Sixth Class state during the British Raj, was ruled by Nagar Brahmins Chieftains.

In 1901 it comprised a single village, covering four square miles, with a population of 414, yielding 4,100 Rupees state revenue (1903–4, nearly all from land), paying no tribute.

== External links and Sources ==
- Imperial Gazetteer, on DSAL.UChicago.edu - Kathiawar
