= Juna Padar =

Village in Gujarat, India

Juna Padar is a village in Saurashtra peninsula, in Gujarat, western India.

== History ==
In 1901 it comprised only the single village, with a population of 193, yielding 900 Rupees state revenue (1903–4, mostly from land), paying 50 Rupees tribute, to the Gaekwar Baroda State and Junagadh State.
