= Vala State =

Principality state in India

Coordinates: 21.8878°N 71.8795°E

Vala State Vallabhipura
- Vassal state of Maratha Confederacy (1740 - 1805); Princely State
- 1740–1948
- Flag
- Area
  - 1921: 492 km^{2} (190 sq mi)
- Population
  - 1921: 11,386
- History
  - Established: 1740
  - Indian independence: 1948
Succeeded by
India

Vala State or Vallabhipura was a non-salute princely state in India during the British Raj until 1948. The centre was the city of Vallabhi. The last ruler of the state signed the state's accession to the Indian Union on 15 February 1948.

== History ==
Vala (Vallabhipura) princely state was founded in 1740 by Thakore Sahib Akherajji of nearby Bhavnagar (also in Gohelwar prant; later a salute state under a Maharaja), a Gohil Rajput of the Suryavanshi clan, for his twin brother Visaji, who became the first Thakore. It was one of the many states in Saurashtra, mostly petty states. It comprised 40 villages, covering 492 Square Kilometers km^{2}. In 1921 it had a population of 11,386 (13.285 in 1903–4). Its state revenue was 225,000 Rupees (in 1903–4, mainly from land; later 341,773 Rupees), and it paid 9,202 Rupees tribute to the Gaekwar Baroda State and to Junagadh State.

It was a native state of British India in charge of the colonial (originally Eastern -) Kathiawar Agency of the Bombay Presidency., later merged into the Western India States Agency.

It ceased to exist by accession to freshly independent India's then state Saurashtra (now part of Gujarat) on 15 February 1948. The privy purse was fixed at 520,000 Rupees.
