= Gigasaran =

Village and former petty state in Western India

Coordinates: 21.287387°N 70.950965°E

Gigasaran is a village (now called Gigasan) and former petty princely state in Gujarat, Western India.

It lies in Sorath prant, on Saurashtra peninsula.

== History ==
Gigasaran was a petty princely state in Western Kathiawar, comprising solely the village, ruled by Kathi Chieftains.

It had a population of 582 in 1901, yielding a state revenue of 6,600 Rupees (1903–4, nearly all from land) and a paying no tribute.

== External links and Sources ==
History

- Imperial Gazetteer, on dsal.uchicago.edu - Kathiawar
