= Kariana =

Coordinates: 21°53′N 71°21′E

Kariyanna is a small village in Amreli district in the state of Gujarat, India.
