= Kuba State =

Human settlement in Gujarat, India

Kuba State was a non-salute princely state on Saurashtra peninsula in Gujarat, western India.

== History ==
Kuba was ranked as a Sixth Class state in the British Raj.

It comprised a single village, covering three square miles, in 1901 with a population of 396, yielding 3,340 Rupees state revenue (1903–4, nearly all from land), paying no tribute.

The state of Kuba implemented restricted jurisdictional powers until the year 1920, after which the state was withdrawn due to mismanagement. The holders of the state received a cash allowance from the princely state of Baroda and also received Majmudari allowances from some tributaries of Baroda in Kathiawar. Kuba paid annual tribute or udhad to the princely state of Junagadh. The territory of Kuba was attached to Junagadh state according to the Attachment Scheme of 1943.

== External links and sources ==
- Imperial Gazetteer, on DSAL.UChicago.edu - Kathiawar
