= Mevasa =

Town and former princely state in Gujarat

Mevasa is a town and former princely state on Saurashtra peninsula in Gujarat, western India.

== History ==
The minor princely state in Jhalawar prant, ruled by Kathi Chieftains, comprised the town and five other villages. It had a combined population of 619 in 1901, yielding a state revenue of 6,796 Rupees (1903–4, mostly from land) and a paying a tribute of 559 Rupees, to the British and Sukhdi State.

== See also ==
There are two other villages, Mevasa Khadiya and Mevasa Kamribaina, in Junagadh taluka (Sorath prant).
