= Bhalala =

Village in Gujarat state, India

During the British Raj period, Bhalala State, in the present-day Indian state of Gujarat, was a non-salute princely state and was governed by members of a Jhala dynasty.

The rulers ruled with title of Taluqdar Saheb.

== History ==
During British period, Bhalala was a separate tribute-paying taluka under the Wadhwan station thana. The taluka consisted of but one village and Half Dedadra Village in Wadhwan Taluka, the Taluqdar were they were Jhala( RANA) Rajput and wadhvan state bhayat.
