= Bhadva =

Village in Gujarat state, India

Coordinates: 22°05′N 70°55′E

Bhadva is a village in Kotda-Sangni Taluka of Rajkot district, Gujarat, India. It is situated fifteen miles south-east of Rajkot and about thirteen miles north-east of Gondal.

== History ==
During British period, Bhadva was a separate tribute-paying Jadeja holding of four Bhadva villages in the Halar region. The Thakur of the village was Chandrasinhji Kalubha Jadeja.
