= Chudasama Rajput =

Rajput clan in Gujarat, India

The Chudasama are a Rajput clan found in the state of Gujarat in India. They claim descent from Yaduvanshi lineage of Chandravanshi Rajput dynasty. They were an off-shoot of Samma (tribe) of Sind.

== Origin ==
The Anthropological Survey of India, notes the Chudasama Rajputs are an offshoot of the Samma (tribe), probably of the Yaduvanshi origin who entered India during the seventh or eighth century and are found in Kachchh, Junagadh and Jamnagar districts.

== Sub Clans ==
Sarvaiya Rajputs are descendants of the Chudasama branch were Talukdars of many places during British Raj. Their ancestor, Bhim, was the second son of Rah Naundhan, the Chudasama king of Junagarh. As Bhim Received Chorasi of Sarva his descendants later known as Sarvaiya.
