= Kesria =

Human settlement in Gujarat, India

Kesria is a village and former petty Rajput princely state on Saurashtra peninsula in Gujarat, Western India.

== History ==
The non-salute princely state in Jhalawar prant was ruled by Jhala Rajput Chieftains. It comprised only the village.

In 1901 it had a population of 146, yielding a state revenue of 1,900 (1903–4, only from land), paying a 278 Rupees tribute to the British.

== Sources and external links ==
- Imperial Gazetteer on dsal.uchicago.edu - Kathiawar
