= Ankevalia =

Village in Gujarat, India

Coordinates: 22°50′N 71°27′E

Ankevalia is a village in Limbdi Taluka of Surendranagar district, Gujarat, India. It is about four miles north of Limbdi and ten miles north-east of Bhoika and nine miles south-east of Wadhwan.

== History ==
It was a separate tribute paying state under the Bhoika thana during British period. The talukadars were Jhala Rajputs.
