= Dadhalia State =

Vassal state under British Raj in Gujarat

Dadhalia is a town and former Rajput princely state in Gujarat, western India.

== History ==
Dadhalia was a Fifth Class princely state, comprising eleven more villages, covering twenty-eight square miles in Mahi Kantha, It has been deprived of its jurisdiction as taluka due to maladministration and placed under Sabar Kantha thana.

It had a combined population of 2,619 in 1901, yielding a state revenue of 3,689 Rupees (1903–4, half from land), paying tributes of 699 Rupees to the Gaikwar Baroda State and 611 Rupees to Idar State.

== Rulers ==
Rulers took the title of Raja Sahib.

The dates below are as Vikram Samvant

- 1636 : Bichosinhji Sisodiya(Rechaji)
- 1680 : Ramsinhji Sisodiya
- 1723 : Lakhdhirsinhji Sisodiya
- 1732 : Udesinhji Sisodiya
- 1748 : Virsalsinhji Sisodiya
- 1766 : Virbhansinhji Sisodiya
- 1778 : Gopaldassinhji Sisodiya
- 1794 : Gemdassinhji Sisodiya
- Passed away as prince : Sambalsinhji Sisodiya
- 1806-no record: Harisinhji Sisodiya
- no record : Hathisinhji Sisodiya
- 1823-no record: Karansinhji Sisodiya
- no record : Bhagvatsinhji Sisodiya
- 1852 - 1879: Madhusinhji Sisodiya
- 1879 - 1892: Raysinhji Sisodiya
- 1892 - 1922: Laxmansinhji Sisodiya
- 1922 - 1934: Hathisinhji Sisodiya
- 1934 - 1971: Jaswantsinhji Sisodiya
- 1971 – 2009: Amarsinhji Sisodiya
- 2009 - 2021: Takhatsinhji Sisodiya

== Sources and external links ==
- Imperial Gazetteer on dsal.uchicago.edu - Mahi Kantha
