= Talsana =

Village in Gujarat, India

Coordinates: 22°47′28″N 71°54′23″E

Talsana is a village in Gujarat, western India.

== History ==
It had a combined population of 1,691 in 1901, yielding a state revenue of 10,500 Rupees (1903–4, nearly all from land) and paying a tribute of 1,052 Rupees, to the British and Junagadh State.

== See also ==
- Tiku Talsania, Indian actor, originally from Talsana
