= Veja-no-ness State =

Former princely state in Gujarat, India

- Princely State of British India
- 1948
- Area
  - 1931: 0.7511 km^{2} (0.2900 sq mi)
- Population
  - 1931: 206
| Succeeded by |
| India |

Veja-no-ness State, also spelled Vejanoness or Vijanones, was a minor princely state during the British Raj in what is today Gujarat State India. It was administered by the Eastern Kathiawar Agency division of the Western India States Agency. The state had a population of 206 and an area of 0.29 sq miles. Territorially it was the smallest Princely State in India. The state had an annual revenue of 500 rupees.

== Rulers ==
The Rulers had the title of Talukdar.

- Kathi Sura fl. 1896
