= Khijadia Najani =

Human settlement in Gujarat, India

Khijadia(-)Najani is a village and former non-salute princely state on Saurashtra peninsula in Gujarat, Western India.

== History ==
The petty princely state, in Sorath prant, was ruled by Kathi Chieftains.

In 1901 it comprised a single village, with a population of 156, yielding 2,800 Rupees state revenue (1903–4, mostly from land), paying 52 tribute to the Gaikwar Baroda State.

== External links and Sources ==
- Imperial Gazetteer, on DSAL.UChicago.edu - Kathiawar
