= Vanod =

Town and former princely state in India

Vanod is a town and former Rajput salute state in Gujarat, western India.

== History ==
Vanod was a Fifth Class princely state covering 57 square miles, comprising the town and twelve more villages. It had a population of 409 in 1901, yielding a state revenue of 6,435 rupees (1903–4, mostly from land) and paying a tribute of 324 rupees, to the British and Junagadh State.

== External links and sources ==
- Imperial Gazetteer, on dsal.uchicago.edu
- Information on Vanod

Citations
