= Jhampodad =

Human settlement in Gujarat, India

Jhampodad is a village and former Rajput petty princely state on the Saurashtra peninsula, in Gujarat, Western India.

== History ==
The princely state, in Jhalawar prant, was ruled by Jhala Rajputs.

In 1901 it comprised only the single village, with a population of 451, yielding 3400 Rupees state revenue (1903–4, all from land), paying 138 Rupees tribute to the British.
