= Bhimora =

Village in Chotila Taluka of Surendranagar district, Gujarat, India

Coordinates: 22°20′N 71°14′E

Bhimora is a village and former princely state in Chotila Taluka of Surendranagar district, Gujarat, India.

== History ==
The petty princely state in Jhalawar prant, comprising ten more villages, was ruled by offshoot of Chotila's house. Bhimora is said to have been anciently called Bhimpuri. There is a rock-cut cave located here.

== Geography ==
The country around Bhimora is hilly and the river Bhogavo of Limbdi rises near this.

The population according to the census of 1872 was 513 and according to that of 1881, 109 souls. In 1901 it has a combined population of 1,204, yielding a state revenue of 10,555 Rupees (1903–4, nearly all from land), paying 371 Rupees tribute, to the British and Junagadh State.

== Sources and external links ==
- Imperial Gazetteer on dsal.uchicago.edu - Kathiawar

This article incorporates text from a publication now in the public domain: Gazetteer of the Bombay Presidency: Kathiawar. Vol. VIII. Printed at the Government Central Press, Bombay. 1884. p. 399.
