= Dedan State =

Village in Gujarat, India

Dedan is a village and former non-salute princely state on Saurashtra peninsula in Gujarat, Western India.

== History ==
The Fifth Class princely state, in Sorath prant, was ruled by Baberia Kotila kathi Chieftains.

In 1901 it comprised the town and eleven other villages, covering 50 square miles, with a combined population of 4,394, yielding 59,405 Rupees state revenue (1903–4, about half from land), paying 4,181 tribute to the Gaikwar Baroda State und Unamamuli (1225). The first ruler was Dantabapu Kotila and in 1923 the last ruler sat on the throne named Jilubapu Kotila by owning 202 Villages.

== External links and Sources ==
History

- Imperial Gazetteer, on DSAL.UChicago.edu - Kathiawar

The king of Dedan state was Danta bapu Kotila who was the great king.
