= Bhadvana =

Village in Gujarat state, India

Bhadvana is a village in Lakhtar Taluka of Surendranagar district, Gujarat, India. It is situated about twelve miles north east of Wadhwan station and about five miles south of Lakhtar railway station.

== History ==
During British period, Bhadvana is a separate tribute-paying taluka under the Wadhwan station thana. The Garasias were Jhalas Rajput and Bhayad of Limbadi. The taluka consisted of two villages, Bhadvana and Khajeli, then.

There is a large tank at Bhadvana south of the village. The quality of the land is inferior, as much of it is salt waste.
