= Vasavad =

- Census town
- Location in Gujarat, India Vasavad (India)
- Coordinates: 21.8267635°N 71.0236931°E
- Country: India
- State: Gujarat
- District: Rajkot

Population (2001)
  - Total: 4,005

Languages =Gujarati
  - Official: Gujarati, Hindi
- Time zone: UTC+5:30 (IST)
- Postal code: 365460
- Vehicle registration: GJ
- Website: gujaratindia.com

Vasavad is a census town in Rajkot district in the Indian state of Gujarat.
