= Kantharia =

Human settlement in Gujarat, India

Coordinates: 21.7172°N 72.9581°E

Kantharia is a town and former minor Rajput princely state on Saurashtra peninsula in Gujarat, western India.

== Sources an external links ==
- Imperial Gazetteer on dsal.uchicago.edu - Kathiawar
