= Rai-Sankli =

Human settlement in Gujarat, India

Rai-Sankli is a village and former petty princely state on Saurashtra peninsula in Gujarat, western India.

== History ==
The Sixth Class princely state in Jhalawar prant was ruled by (rare) Kunbi Chieftains. It also comprised a second village.

In 1901 it has a population of 427, yielding a state revenue of 6,579 Rupees (1903–4, nearly all from land), paying a 938 Rupees tribute to the British and the Gaekwar Baroda State.

== Rulers ==
The rulers of Rai-Sankli were titled 'Amin Shree'. The rulers belonged to chavda clan of Mansa state Trikamji Chavda son of King Raolji Rajsinhji Chavda Married to daughter of Ruler of Rai-Sankli and later became successor of Rai-Sankli and accepted as Kunbi. Rai-Sankli rulers also ruled Hasan Nagar estate.

=== Amin Shreejis ===
- 1905 – 1945 Trikamji Rajsinhji (b. 1880 – d. 1945)
- 1945 – 1988 Tryambakchandraji Trikamji (b. 1912 – d. 1988)
- 1988 – 2012 Jagdish Chandra ji Tryambakchanraji (b. 1935 – d. 2012)
- 2012 – Present RaniSaheba YoginaDeviji Jagdish Chandra ji (b. 1968 – present)
- Current heir apparent is Kumari shri RichaKumariji

The Rulers of Princely State of Rai-Sankli and Hasan Nagar estate were the first to join the union of India. They faced trouble from British rulers for being freedom supporter and secular.
