= Gabat State =

Former princely state in Gujarat, India

Gabat, also spelled Gubut, is a village and former petty princely state in Bayad Taluka, Sabarkantha District, Gujarat, western India.
