= Kherali =

- Village
- Location in Gujarat, India Kherali (India)
- Coordinates: 22°41′0″N 71°36′0″E
- Country: India
- State: Gujarat
- District: Surendranagar

Languages
  - Official: Gujarati, Hindi
- Time zone: UTC+5:30 (IST)
- Vehicle registration: GJ-13
- Coastline: 0 kilometres (0 mi)
- Nearest city: Surendranagar
- Website: gujaratindia.com

Kherali is a village in Surendranagar district in the Indian state of Gujarat. It comes on the way from Surendranagar to Limli, and this route leads to Muli. It has population close to 6,000-10,000. The village is grown around one abandoned palace. The village has got one big lake and many other wells including one stepwell. It has few temples including two Swaminarayan temple, Rama temple, krishna temple, shaktimaa temple and one well-built mosque. There are also government and one private school also . The village is mostly surrounded by farms. The population mostly depend on farming, and young generation go for jobs and business to Surendranagar and around cities. The main crops are wheat, cotton, ground-nuts, and sesames.

== Places of interest ==
Kherali Vav or Rajbai Vav is a stepwell located in the village. There is an inscription in Sanskrit language and Devnagari script in the stepwell which notes that it was built in 1463. According to folklore, it was built by Paramara ruler Jagdev's minister Lakhdhirsinh, in memory of his wife. According to the inscription, her name was Vejaldevi. The stepwell has seven storeys. It has 108 steps and is 110 feet deep. In the first pavilion-tower of the stepwell, there are statues of goddess Matri and Chamunda in the niches.
