= Randhia =

Village in Gujarat state, India

Coordinates: 21°42′N 71°09′E

Randhiya is a village on Saurashtra peninsula in Gujarat, western India. Randhiya was formerly a princely state.
