= Bhoika =

Village in Surendranagar district on Saurashtra in Gujarat, India

Coordinates: 22°30′N 71°53′E

Bhoika is a village and former Rajput princely state in Limbadi Taluka of Surendranagar district, on Saurashtra in Gujarat, India.

== History ==
The Sixth Class tribute-paying state in Jhalawar prant, comprising two more villages, was ruled by a cadet ranch of Limbdi State. During the British Raj, it was the head-quarters of an Agency thana which superintended the affairs of the independent Bhayat of Limbdi. The Garasias once commenced to build a fort of which the remains may be seen, but were prevented completing it by the Limbdi chief. There is a minaret in the Bhoika village of Jhobala, said to have been built by one of the cadets of the Jundgadh's house. One of the Bhoika Jhalas had worked with Bhavnagar State during the reign of Vakhatsinghji.

The population according to the census, of 1872 was 2169 and according to that of 1881, 2286 souls. In 1901 it has a population of 3,013, yielding a state revenue of 20,000 Rupees (1903–4, nearly all from land), paying 2,132 Rupees tribute, to the British, Junagadh State and Sukhdi State.

== Sources and external links ==
- Imperial Gazetteer on dsal.uchicago.edu - Kathiawar
- This article incorporates text from a publication now in the public domain: Gazetteer of the Bombay Presidency: Kathiawar. Vol. VIII. Printed at the Government Central Press, Bombay. 1884. p. 399.
