= Rajpipla State =

Princely state of India

Coordinates: 21°47′15″N 73°33′48″E

- Princely State of India
- 1340–1948
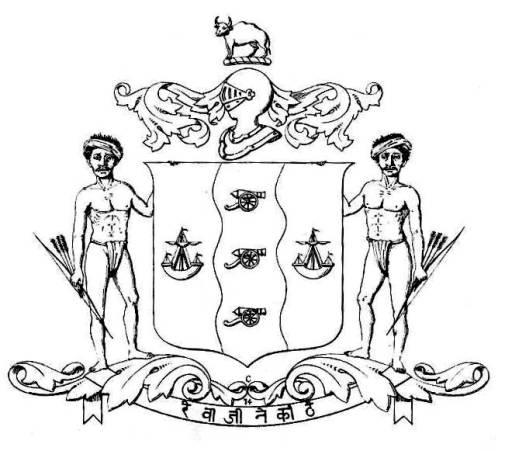
- Flag Coat of arms
- Capital: Rajpipla (Nandod)
- Area
  - 1941: 3,929 km^{2} (1,517 sq mi)
- Population
  - 1941: 2,49,032
- History
  - Established: 1340
  - Merger with the Union of India: 1948
Succeeded by
India
- Today part of: Narmada district, Gujarat, India

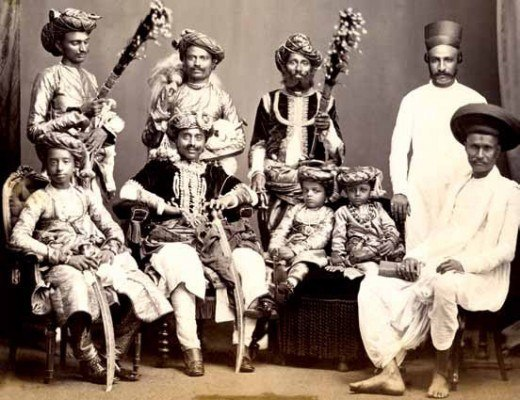
Maharana Gambhirsinhji with court officials and family members

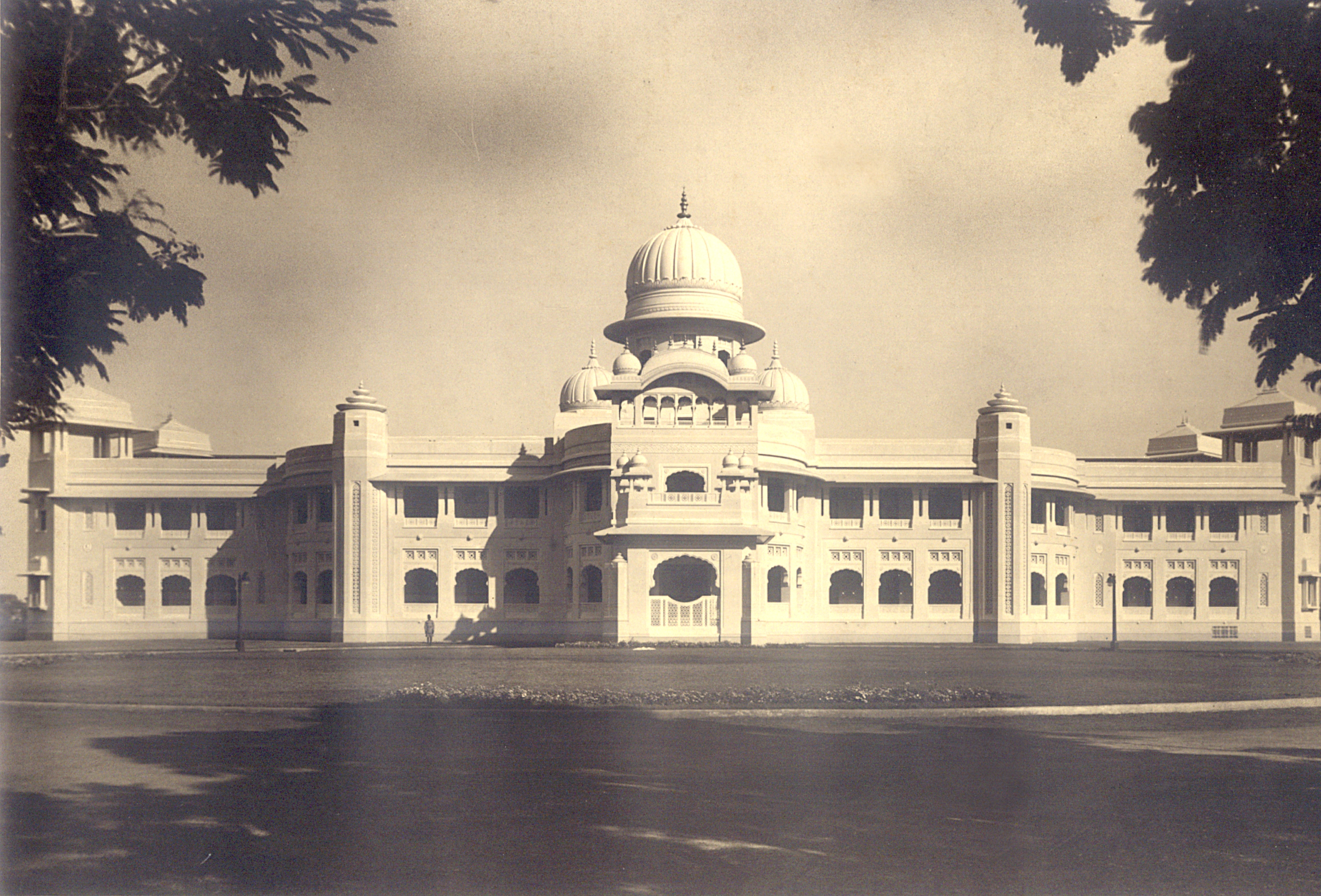
Indrajit-Padmini Mahal (Vadia Palace)

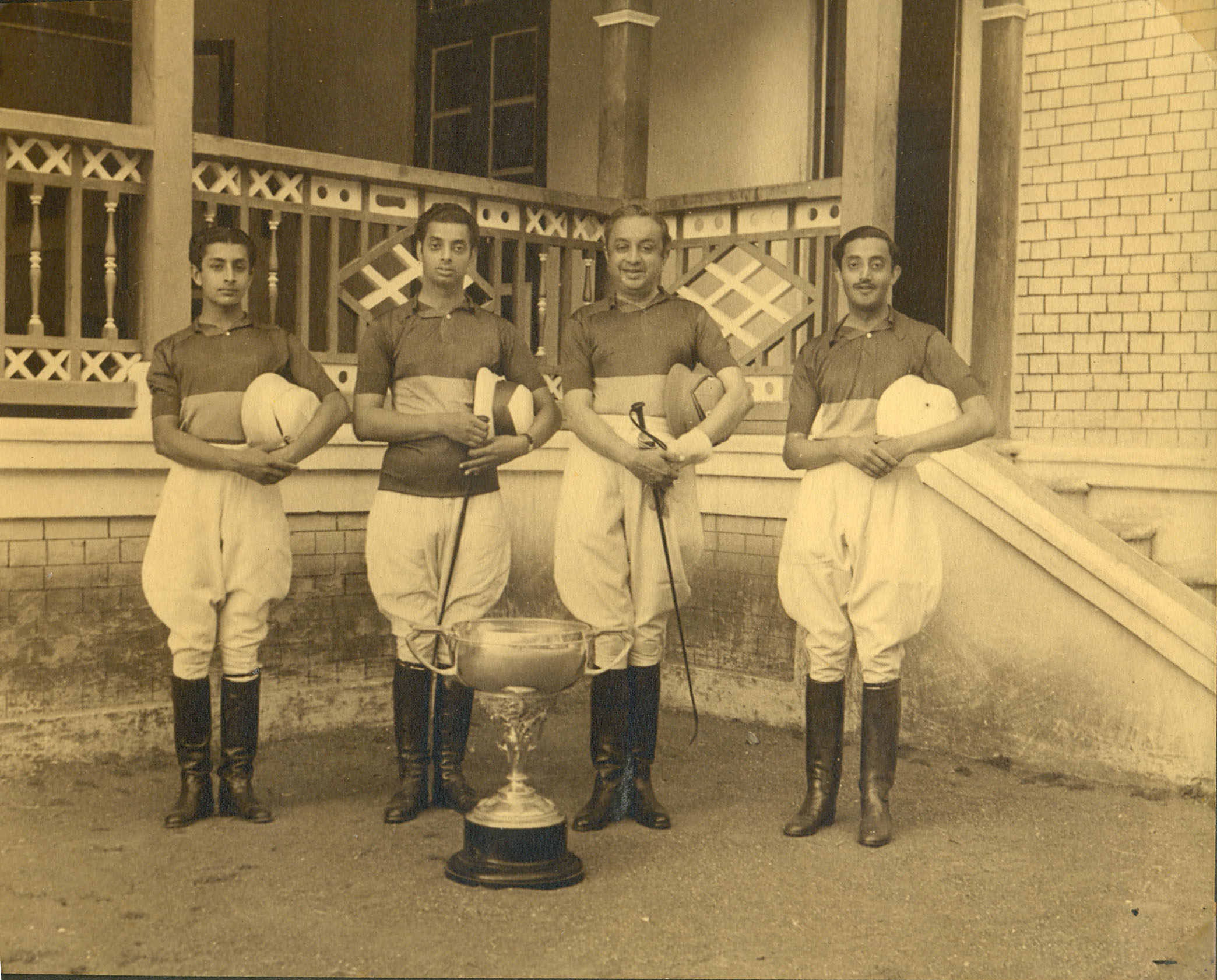
Rajpipla Polo Team 1943

The Kingdom of Rajpipla or Rajpipla State was a princely state, with full internal jurisdiction, in India ruled by the Gohil Rajput dynasty for over 600 years from around 1340 until 1948. It was the largest State, and the only first-class State, of the Rewa Kantha Agency. Among Gujarat States (as distinct from Kathiawar or Saurashtra States), Rajpipla State was the second-largest after Baroda (Vadodara) in terms of size and importance. The Gohil Rajput dynasty of Rajpipla survived the onslaught of the Sultans of Ahmedabad and the Mughals during the mediaeval period, and the Gaekwars of Baroda and the British in the modern period, to emerge as a well-administered State with contemporary infrastructure, policies and practices by the time it was merged with the Union of India on 10 June 1948.

== History ==
Maharaja Vijaysinhji built an aerodrome in Rajpipla on a 125-acre site on the banks of the River Karjan in the late 1920s. This became defunct since merger of Rajpipla State with the Union of India in 1948. But after the building of the Statue of Unity in close proximity to Rajpipla, Government of Gujarat decided to revive this in 2018, and build a new Rajpipla airport there.
