= Sarvaiya =

Social group in India

The Sarvaiya also spelled Sarvaiyya, Sarvia, Sarwia, Savaria, Sawaria or Sawariya are a social group of India, mainly found in Gujarat. They are an offshoot of the Chudasamas and claim descent from the Yaduvanshi Rajput lineage. Their ancestor, Bhim, was the second son of Rao Naundhan, the Chudasama king of Junagarh. As Bhim Received Chorasi of Sarva his descendants later known as Sarvaiya. Sarvaiya Rajputs were jagirdars of many estate, like Vasavad, Bhadli, Chital, Bhakhalka till Independence of India, when jagirdari was abolished.

The fort of Vejalkotha also known as Vejalkot is named after its founder Sarvaiya Vejoji who fought with troops of Sultan Mahmud Begda from there, which is located in Girnar on eastern bank of Raval river and is now an archaeological site of interest.

Some archaeological evidence and inscriptions mentioning this facts have been found and unearthed like Hathsani inscription and others found among ruins of Vejalkot.

At the time of independence, the princely state of Jesar, Hathsani, Datha and nearby estates were ruled by Sarvaiya Rajputs. The Jesar State and Datha princely state along with other Princely States was merged into Union of India to form the United State of Kathiawar.
