= Jhala =

Jhala (Hindi: झाला, [dʒʱaːla]) is a term in Hindustani classical music which denotes the fast-paced conclusions of classical compositions or raga. It is often characterized by the overwhelming of the melodic component by the rhythmic component. This is sometimes affected by the rapid striking together of the chikari between notes.
