= Gohelwar =

Historical region in Gujarat, India

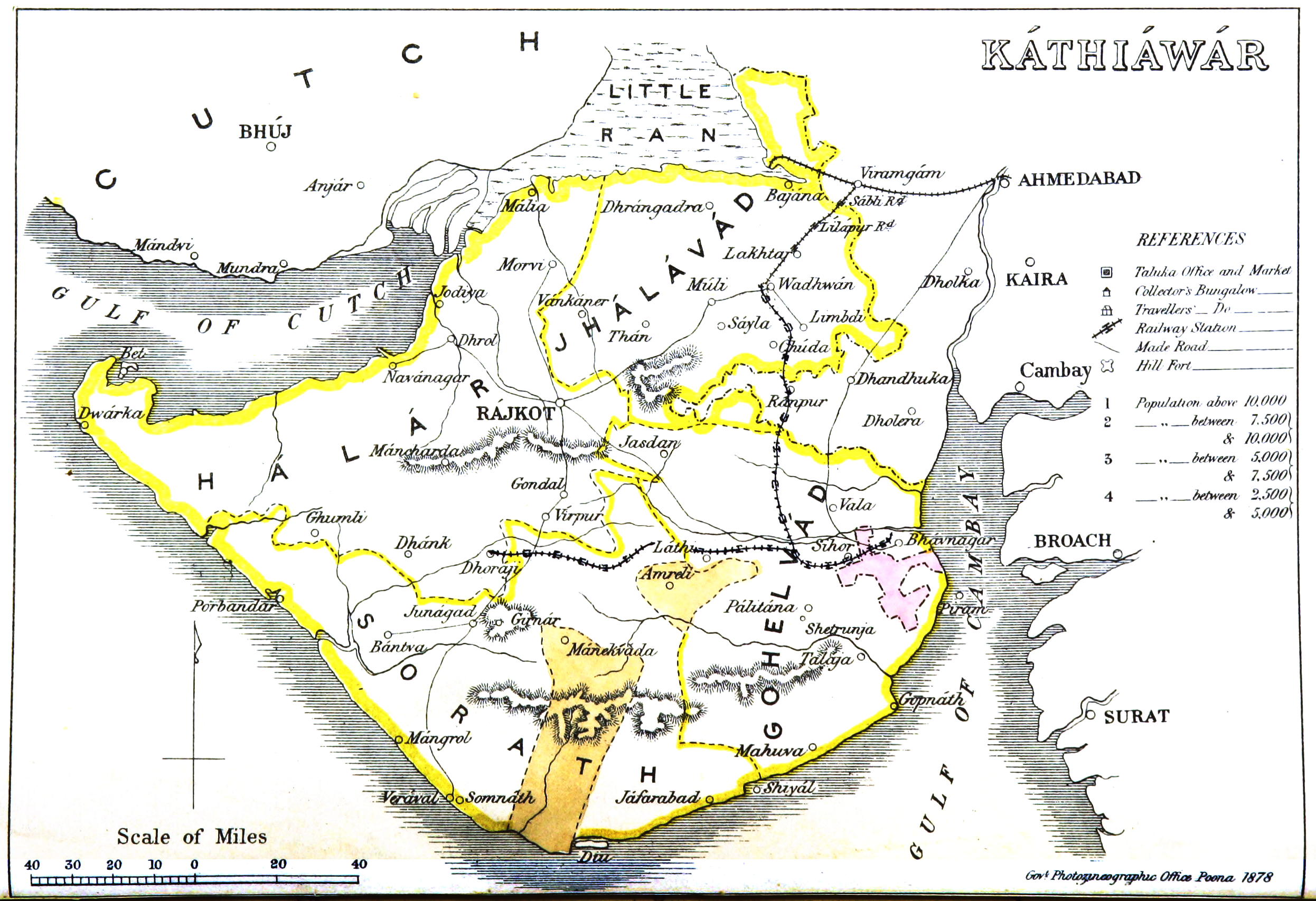
Map of the four prants of Kathiawar, 1855

Gohilwar was one of the four prants or traditional provinces of Saurashtra, the others being Jhalawar or Jhalavad, Halar, and Sorath.

Gohilwar covered the southeast of the Kathiawar peninsula, and roughly corresponds to the modern Bhavnagar District and Botad district.

== Princely states ==
Its salute states were :

- First Class: Bhavnagar (entitled to a hereditary 13-guns salute and a 15-guns local salute, with the King titled Maharaja)
- Second Class: Palitana (entitled to a hereditary 9-guns salute, with the King titled Thakur Sahib)

The major non-salute states included:

- Third Class: Jasdan, Vala
- Fourth Class: Lathi
- Fifth Class: none
- Sixth Class: Bhadli, Itaria, Kotra Pitha, Limbda, Vankia
- Seventh Class: Kariana

Several more princely estates and states existed in this region, however, they would typically own only one or two villages.

== See also ==
- Lists of princely states of India
