= Kathi people =

Caste in Gujarat, India

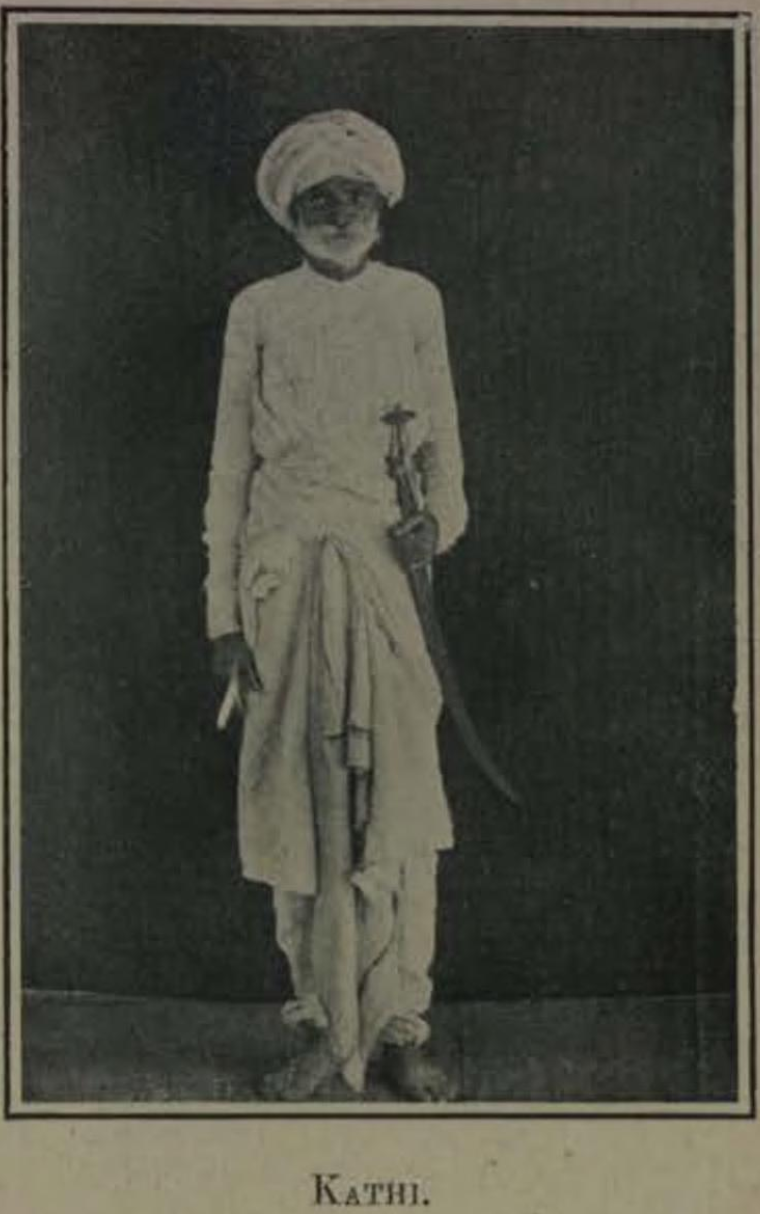
A Kāṭhī man, 1911.

The Kāṭhī people are a small group of clans found in the peninsular Kathiawar (historically called Saurashtra) of Gujarat, western India. The Maratha Empire, and later the British Raj, renamed the Saurashtra as Kathiawar as the Kāṭhīs were prominent there during the 17th-18th centuries.

== History ==
The sun-worshipping Kāṭhīs, who lent their name to the region of Kathiawar, are documented as serving under the Cūdāsamās during the eleventh century. Previously under the authority of the Sūmrās of Sind, they were compelled to escape Sindh and seek sanctuary with the Vālā chieftain in Saurashtra. During this era, the Kāṭhīs appeared to be marginalised, as the Vālā leader was reportedly ostracised from his caste after dining with them, leading to his deposition from kingship by his siblings. He subsequently allied himself with the Kāṭhī people to conquer various territories, including seizing the Than-Chotila area from the Soḍhās. Offspring of the Kāṭhī–Vālā coalition established three Kāṭhī tribes, which were named after them. They also formed marital bonds with indigenous clans, such as the Dhāndhal Rāṭhoḍs and Jhālās.

According to tradition, a Kāṭhī called Vāloji fled from Pāvāgaḍh. He defeated Jām Abdā of Thān with the help of the Sun god, and in return Vāloji repaired the sun temple on Kandolā Hill (originally built by Māndhātā in Satya Yuga). Vāloji's daughter, Sonabāi, married Vālerā Jālu and became the priestess of the temple. Sonabāi's descendants, known as Bhagats, form the main sun-worshipping strand of Kāṭhīs, with their kuladevatā being the sun.

Renowned for their prowess in combat, the Kāṭhī people were esteemed as premier cattle rustlers and adept horse breeders, producing some of India's most resilient equines. Kāṭhīs were often engaged as military aides and did not ascend to a prominent status akin to Rajputs, being expelled from Sind by the Samma Jām Abdā. By the fifteenth century, various branches of the Kāṭhī had also settled in Kachchh, where they established the kingdom of Pavāgaḍh near Bhuj. According to one tradition, they were reputedly brought to Gujarat by the legendary figure of the Mahābhārata, Karṇa, due to their unmatched expertise in cattle rustling. They were subsequently displaced from Kachchh by the Jāḍejās and relocated to the Than region.

The Kāṭhī people were originally pastoralists and many robbed and plundered villages until the 19th century. In the 20th century, most Kāṭhīs had become settled with farm land and property.

A. M. Shah states that Kāṭhīs are a peasant caste.

== Subdivisions ==
There are several branches of Kāṭhī peoples, including Vaḷā, Sakhāyat, Khumān, Khācar, and Auratiya. For example, the Vaḷā Kāṭhīs were formed when a Vaḷā Rājput married a Kāṭhī woman. The Auratiyas were formed on another occasion when Rājputs married Kāṭhi women. Historically, while Kāṭhī women were known to marry Rājput men, marriages with Āhirs and Bābariās were more common. The Kāṭhī subgroups who originate from mixed Rajput-Kāṭhī origins are of higher status than those who have purely Kāṭhī ancestry.

== Classification ==
Kāṭhīs are currently classified as Other Backward Class in the central list of Gujarat.

== Culture ==
The Kāṭhīs practised the partition of territory upon a rulers death, in which his territory would be carved out among his sons. However, the British encouraged the practice of primogeniture, in which a ruler's territory would be completely inherited by his eldest son (or whomever was next in succession). The British favoured this practice because it was easier to maintain control over a few large states, rather than hundreds of small ones. However, by the late 1920s, only a few Kāṭhī rulers had adopted primogeniture.

Kāṭhī people are known for being good horse breeders, which are usually adorned with elaborate decorations. Kāṭhīs generally prefer mares (to whom they give affectionate names) rather than stallions.

Kāṭhīs have borrowed many customs and traditions from Rajputs, such as the seclusion of women, who could originally move freely in public.

In Kāṭhī weddings, the bridegroom wears clothing similar to that of Rajputs and possesses weaponry, along with the wedding procession. Upon arriving at the bride's village, the bridegroom's bard sings praises of the family and opium is served. Only the bride's female relatives are present, who wears only unstitched clothing and is covered by a veil. Kāṭhī dowries consist of bedding, wooden chests, a swing-cum-bed, vessels, and other domestic goods.

Kāṭhīs were originally sun-worshippers, but now also worship general Hindu deities and western Indian goddesses. The new movements of Swaminarayana and Satyanarayana have also recently attracted Kāṭhī followers.

The Kāṭhīs of Rajkot eat the meat of goats, sheep, fowl, and a few other domesticated animals, a trait which is also shared with the local Kolis.
