= Prant =

Historical term for district in India used in British Raj

A prant is a historical district in India, and a native British Raj age term for a colonial district. The same name can thus have different meanings depending on the period.

== Pre-colonial ==
Some prants are traditional names for parts of historical regions, such as the original ten regions of Kathiawad on Saurashtra peninsula in Gujarat: Jhalawar in the north, Machhukantha west of it, Halar in the northwest, Okhamandal in the extreme west (controlled by Baroda), Barda of Jethwar along the southwest coast, Sorath (a Muslim corruption of Saurashtra) in the south, Babriawar in the hilly southeast, Kathiawar proper (large and central), Undsarviya along Shetrunji river and then finally Gohelwad, along the eastern Cambay coast and comminated by Gohel Rajputs.

== Colonial ==
=== British ===
During the British Raj, the term is often applied to the colonial Districts of British India (which were British possessions).

At the same time, the agency exercising indirect rule over the princely states in Kathiawar on Saurashtra peninsula in Gujarat (which were not British possessions) grouped them in four prants (now quarters, absorbing six historical ones above) : Gohelwad, Halar, Jhalawar and Sorath.

=== Native ===
However a Raj-age prant can also still be a native term for a 'province' of a large princely state in a subsidiary alliance with the British. Thus, the Rajput Gaekwad Rajput dynasty organised its Baroda State into four administrative prants, equivalent to British Districts (like much of its institutions), namely Baroda itself, Kadi (the largest), Navsari and Amreli, the smallest.

== External links and Sources ==
- Imperial Gazetteer, on dsal.uchicago.edu : passim, here Kathiawar article
