= Junagadh State =

Former princely state in Gujarat, India (1730–1948)

Coordinates: 21.52°N 70.47°E

State of Junagadh
- 1730–1948
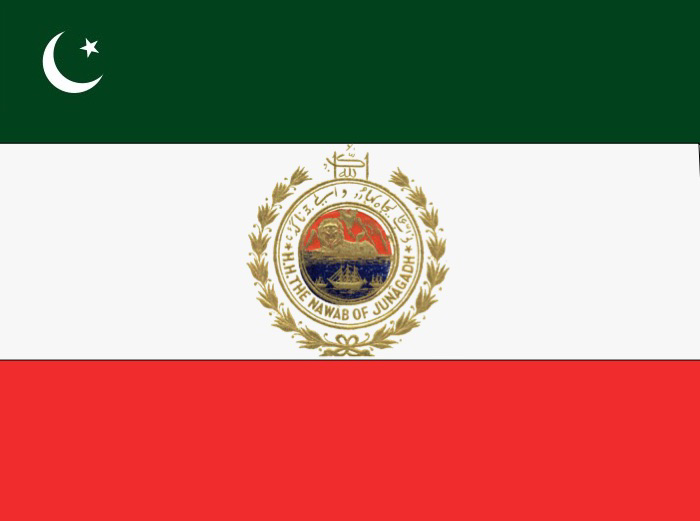
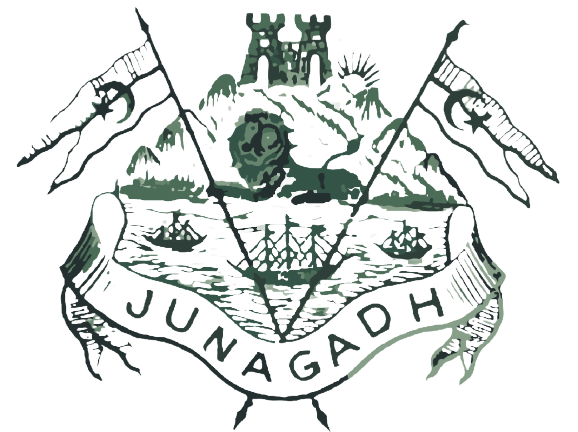
- Flag (1947–48) Emblem

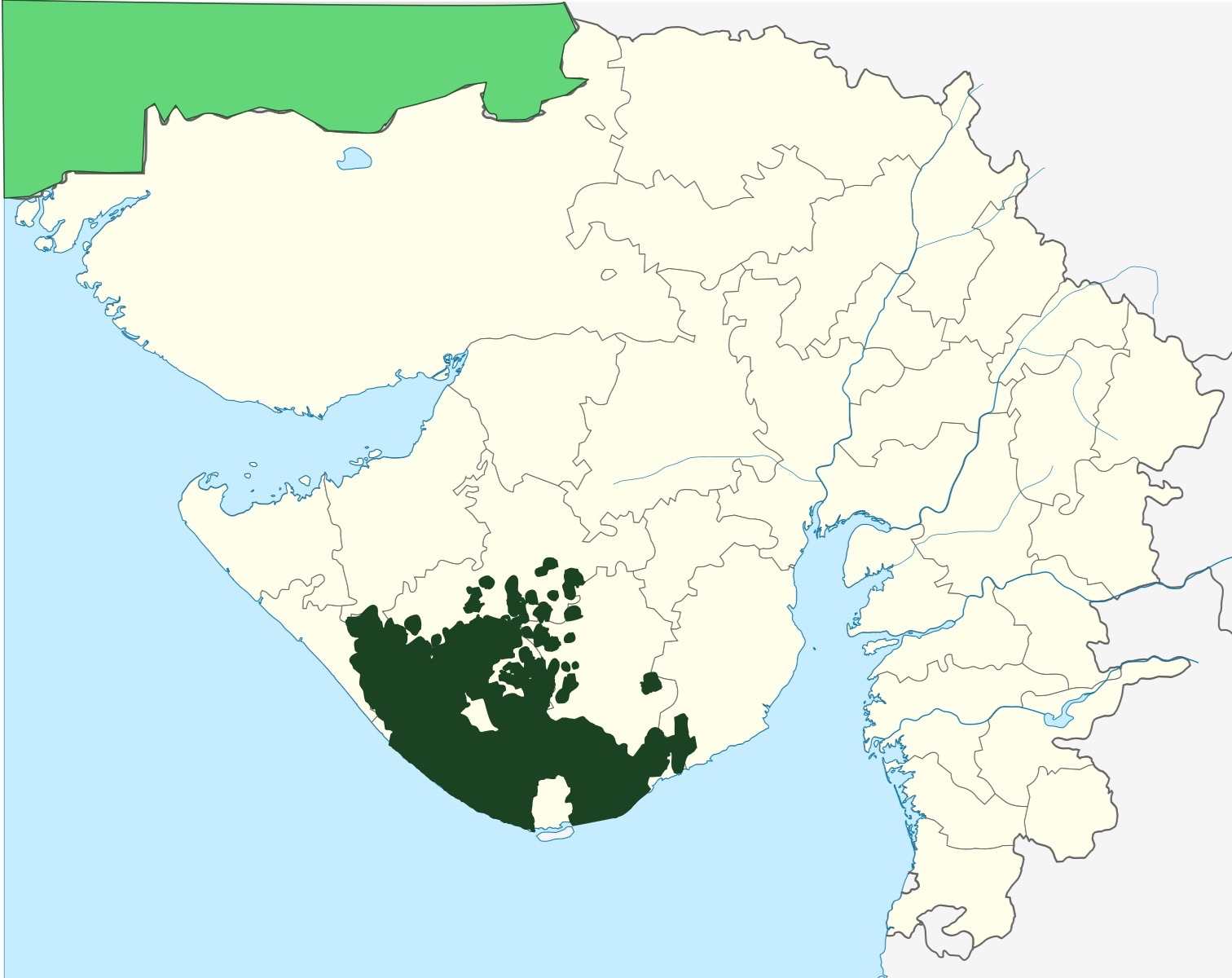
- Location of the State of Junagarh, among all districts (in dark green)
- Status: State Within the Maratha Confederacy (1731–1807); Protectorate of the East India Company (1807–1857); Princely State of the British Raj (1857–1947)
- Capital: Junagadh
- Nawab
  - 1730– 1758 (first): Mohammad Bahadur Khanji I
  - 1911–1948 (last): Muhammad Mahabat Khan III
- History
  - Founded: 1730
  - Annexation of Junagarh: 1948

Area
- 1921: 8,643 km^{2} (3,337 sq mi)

Population
  - 1921: 465,493
Preceded by	Succeeded by
Maratha Empire	Saurashtra
- Today part of: Gujarat, India

Modern state of Gujarat, shown within modern borders of India

The State of Junagadh was a princely state in the Kathiawar Peninsula of western India, located in present-day Gujarat. Ruled by the Babi dynasty of Muslim Nawabs since 1654, it was one of the larger princely states in the region firstly within the Maratha Empire and later by British India. In 1947, following the partition of India, Junagadh became the subject of a political dispute when its ruler, Nawab Mahabat Khan III, acceded to Pakistan despite the state's predominantly Hindu population and its geographical contiguity with India. This decision led to unrest and the eventual intervention of the Government of India. After a plebiscite held in 1948, in which an overwhelming majority voted in favor of accession to India, Junagadh was integrated into the Indian Union and later became part of the state of Gujarat. Pakistan claims sovereignty over the erstwhile princely state to this day.

== History ==
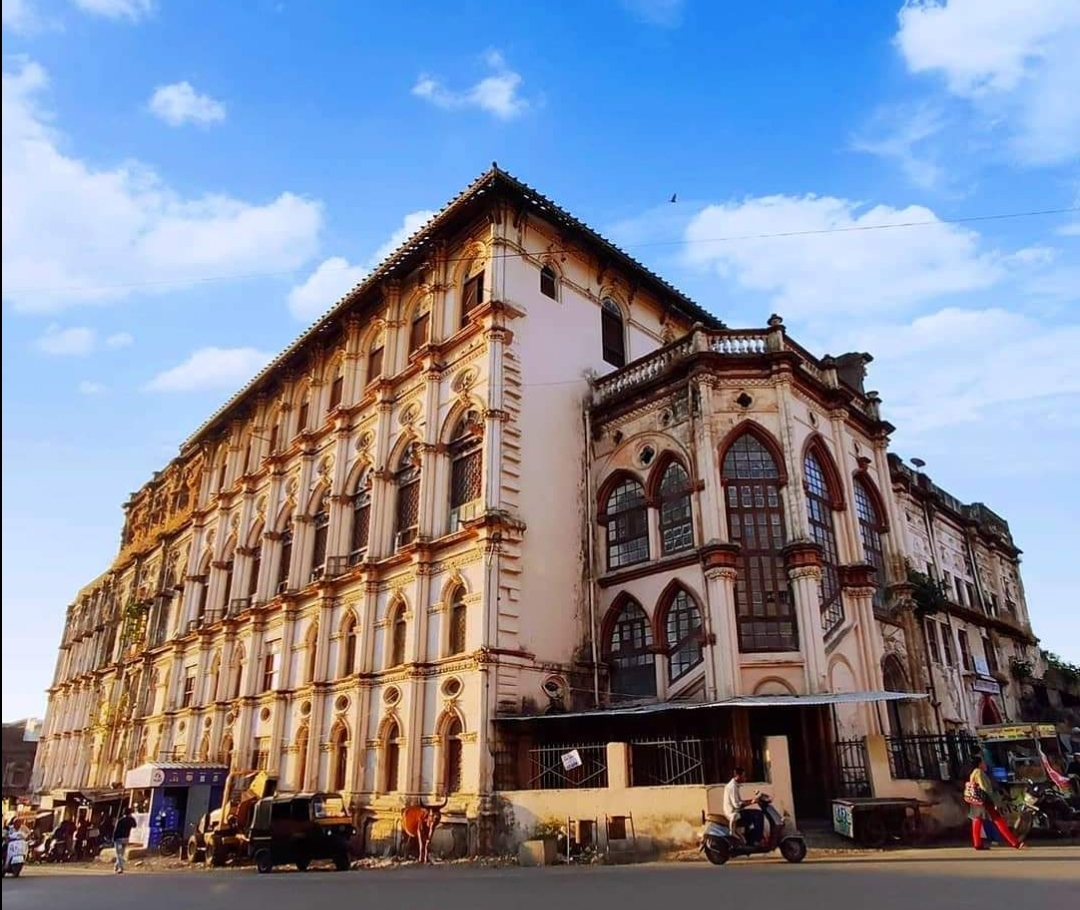
Junagadh Museum

The state of Junagadh was established by the Maharaja of Parmar Rajputs. Muhammad Sher Khan Babai was the founder of the Babi Pashtun dynasty of Junagarh in 1654. His descendants, the Babi Nawabs of Junagarh, conquered large territories in southern Saurashtra.

However, during the collapse of the Mughal Empire, the Babis became involved in a struggle with the Gaekwad dynasty of the Maratha Empire over control of Gujarat, during the reign of the local Mohammad Mahabat Khanji I. Mohammad Khan Bahadur Khanji I declared independence from the Mughal governor of Gujarat subah, and founded the state of Junagarh in 1730. This allowed the Babi to retain sovereignty of Junagarh and other princely states. During the reign of his heir Junagarh was a tributary to the Maratha Empire, until it came under British suzerainty in 1807 under Mohammad Hamid Khanji I, following the Second Anglo-Maratha War.

In 1807, Junagarh became a British protectorate and the East India Company took control of the state. By 1818, the Saurashtra area, along with other princely states of Kathiawar, were separately administered under the Kathiawar Agency by British India.

In 1947, during the partition of India, the last Babi dynasty ruler of the state, Muhammad Mahabat Khanji III, decided to accede to the Dominion of Pakistan but Junagarh was annexed by India which was followed by a plebiscite in which the locals voted to stay with India.

== Koli Rebellion ==
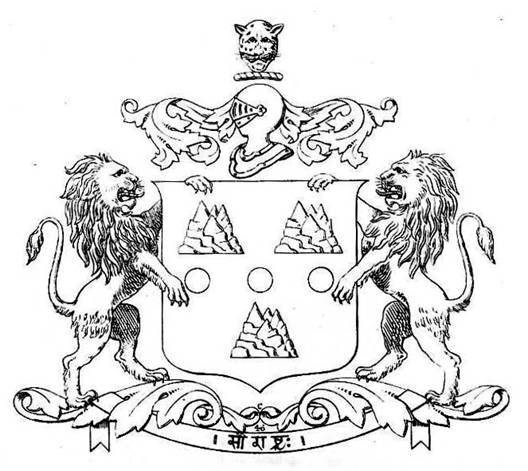
A coat of arms was granted to Muhammed Mahabat Khanji II at the Durbar in Delhi of 1877, used until 1947.

There was a Koli rebellion in Junagarh by Mansa Khant during the reign of Nawab Sher Khan (the first ruler of Junagarh). He revolted against the ongoing Mughal Rule, with Uparkot Fort serving as his centre of operations. He made a series of raids into the surrounding villages and cities. Nawab Sher Khan was unsuccessful in suppressing the rebellion. Mansa Khant occupied Uparkot for 13 months and continued to carry out numerous raids mostly in the countryside. The nawab was assisted by the ruler of Gondal State, Thakur Sahib Haloji Jadeja and Arab Jamadar Sheikh Abdullah Zubeidi in his campaign against the rebellion. The combined forces defeated Mansa Khant, captured Uparkot and crushed the rebellion.

== Annexation by India ==
In 1947, Shah Nawaz Bhutto joined the council of ministers of Nawab Muhammad Mahabat Khan III, and in May became his dewan or prime minister.

With the partition of India in 1947, the princely states were left by the British to decide whether to accede to one of the newly independent Union of India or Dominion of Pakistan, or become a separate country.

The Constitutional Advisor to the Nawab, Nabi Baksh, indicated to Lord Mountbatten that he was recommending that Junagarh should join India. However, upon the advice of Dewan Bhutto, on 15 August 1947, the Nawab announced that Junagarh had acceded to Pakistan. On 16 September, the Government of Pakistan accepted the accession.

India sent its military into Junagarh while the Nawab of Junagarh was in Pakistan and captured the State of Junagarh. The annexation of Junagarh by India led to the Nawab Muhammad Mahabat Khan III of Junagarh (of the erstwhile Babi Nawab dynasty of Junagarh) living in exile in Sindh, Pakistan.

=== Pakistan's claim ===
Pakistan's government has maintained its territorial claim on Junagadh, along with Manavadar and Sir Creek in Gujarat, on its official political maps. On 10 December 2020, Sultan Ahmed Ali took oath as the Dewan of Junagadh State.

== List of rulers ==
=== Rulers ===
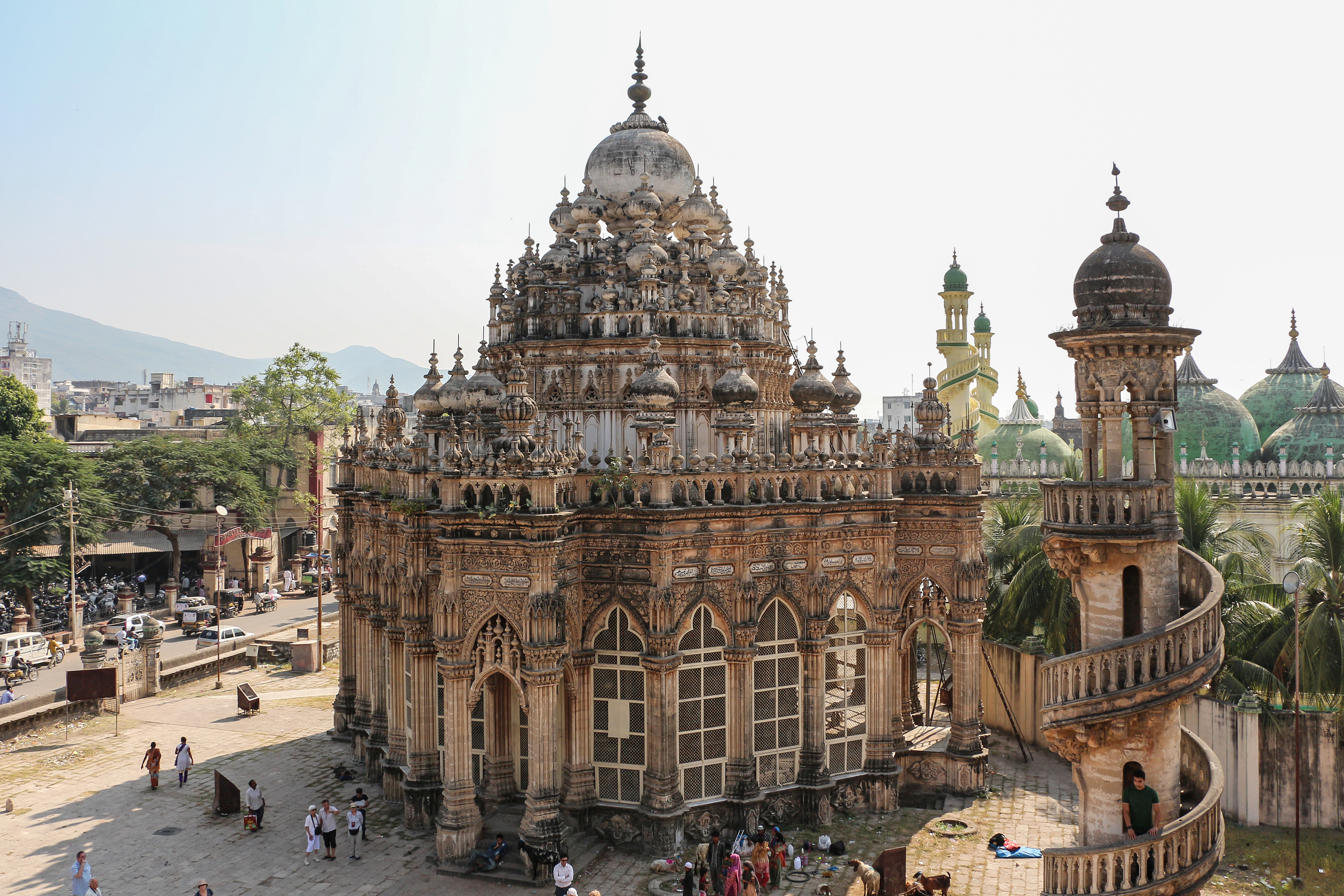
Tomb of Mahabat Khan

The Nawabs of Junagarh belonged to Pathan Babi or Babai (Pashtun tribe). They were granted a 13 gun salute by the British authorities:

- 1730–1758 : Mohammad Bahadur Khanji I or Mohammad Sher Khanji Babai
- 1758–1774: Mohammad Mahabat Khan I
- 1774–1811: Mohammad Hamid Khan I
- 1811–1840: Mohammad Bahadur Khan II
- 1840–1851: Mohammad Hamid Khan II
- 1851–1882: Mohammad Mahabat Khan II
- 1882–1892: Mohammad Bahadur Khan III
- 1892–1911: Mohammad Rasul Khan
- 1911–1948: Mohammad Mahabat Khan III (last ruler before the integration of Junagarh into India)
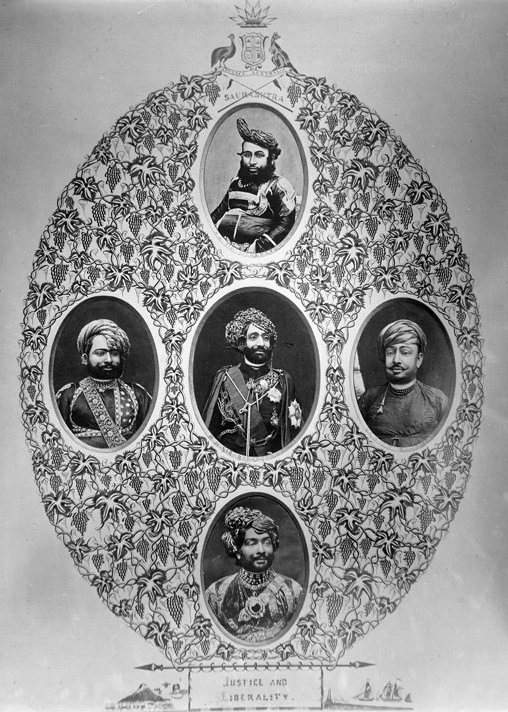
Junagarh Nawabs and state officials, 19th century

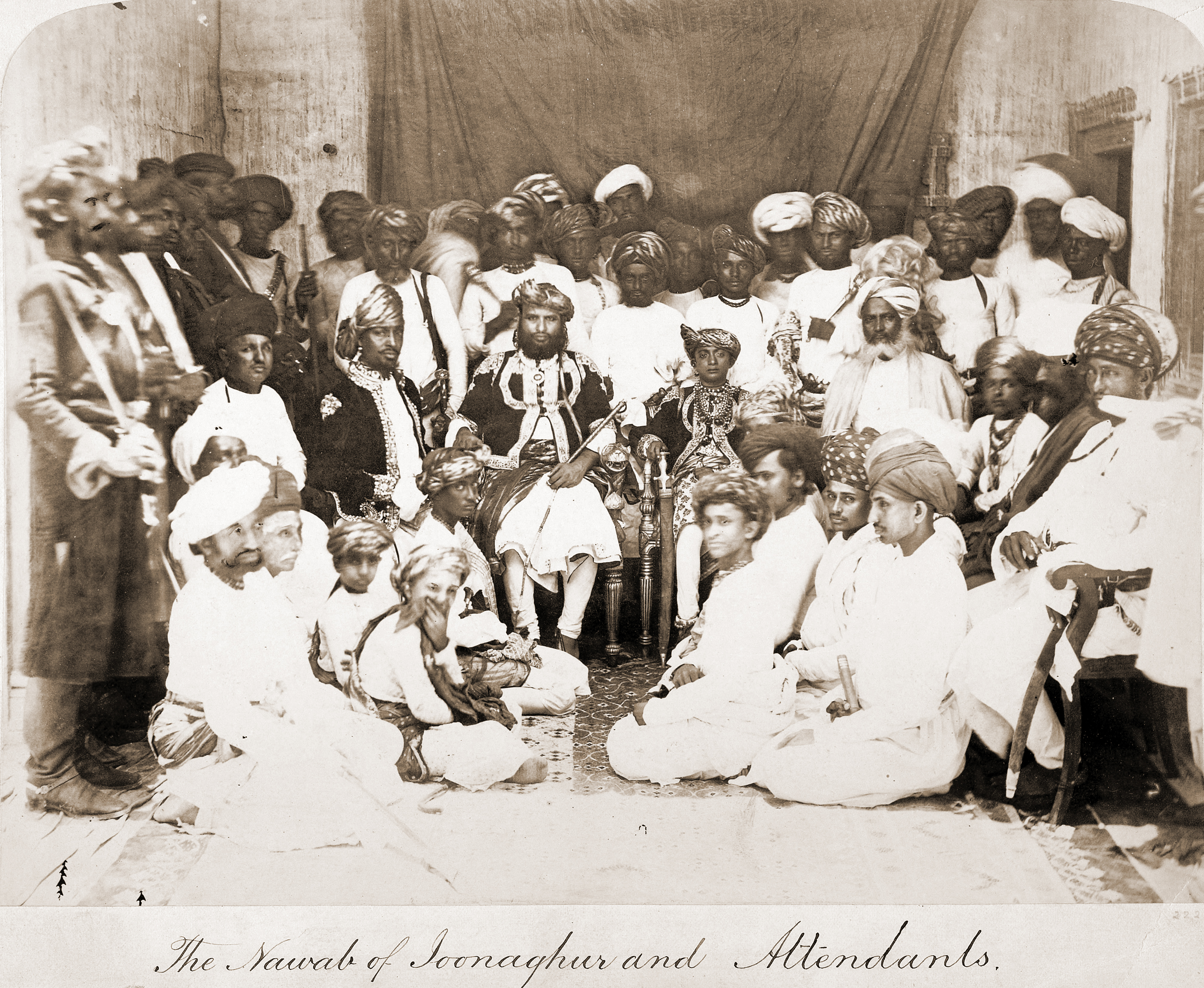
Mohammad Mahabat Khanji II, the Nawab of Junagarh, with young, Mohammad Bahadur Khanji III, 1870s

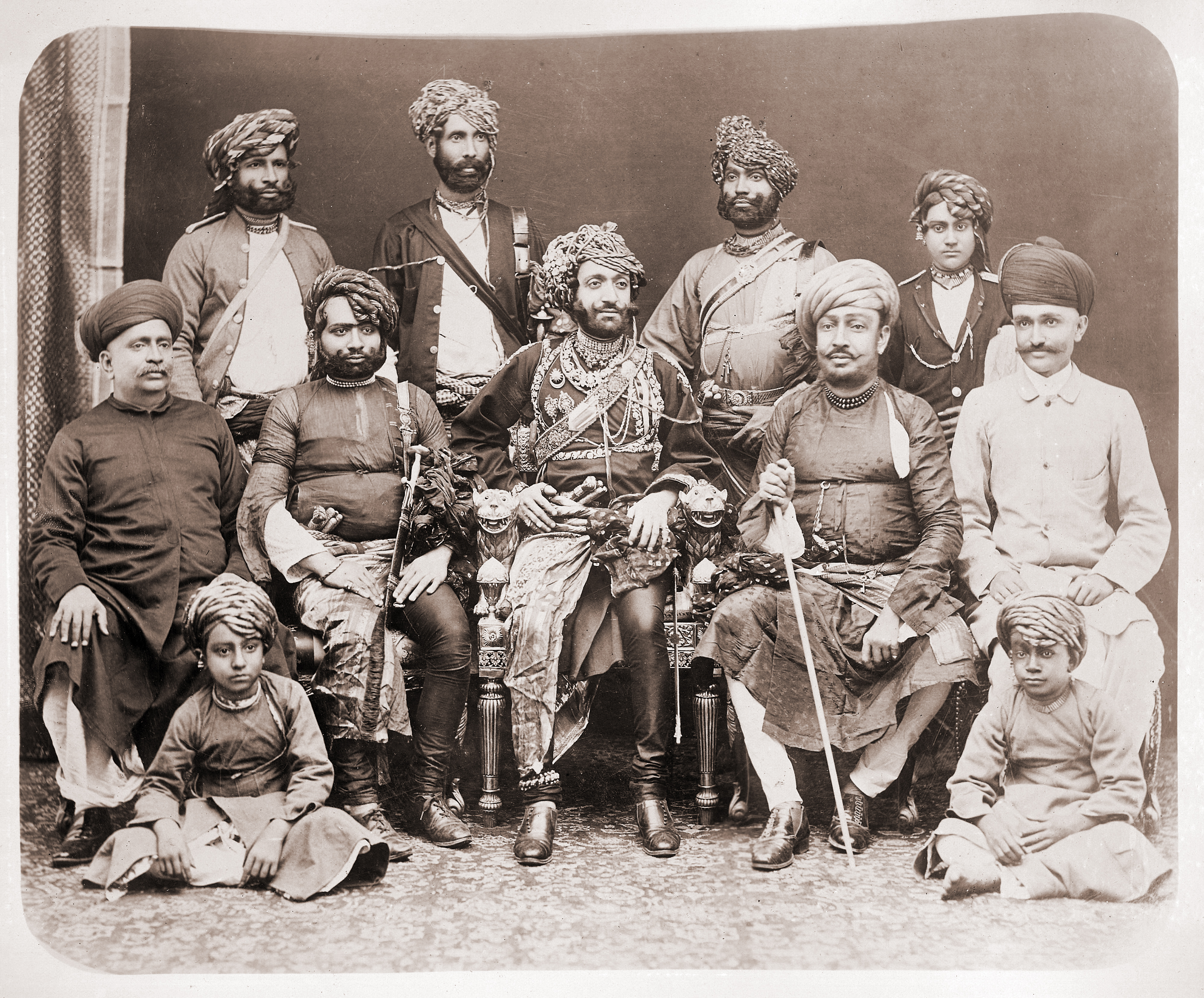
Bahadur Khanji II (r. 1882–1892), Nawab of Junagarh, and state officials, 1880s

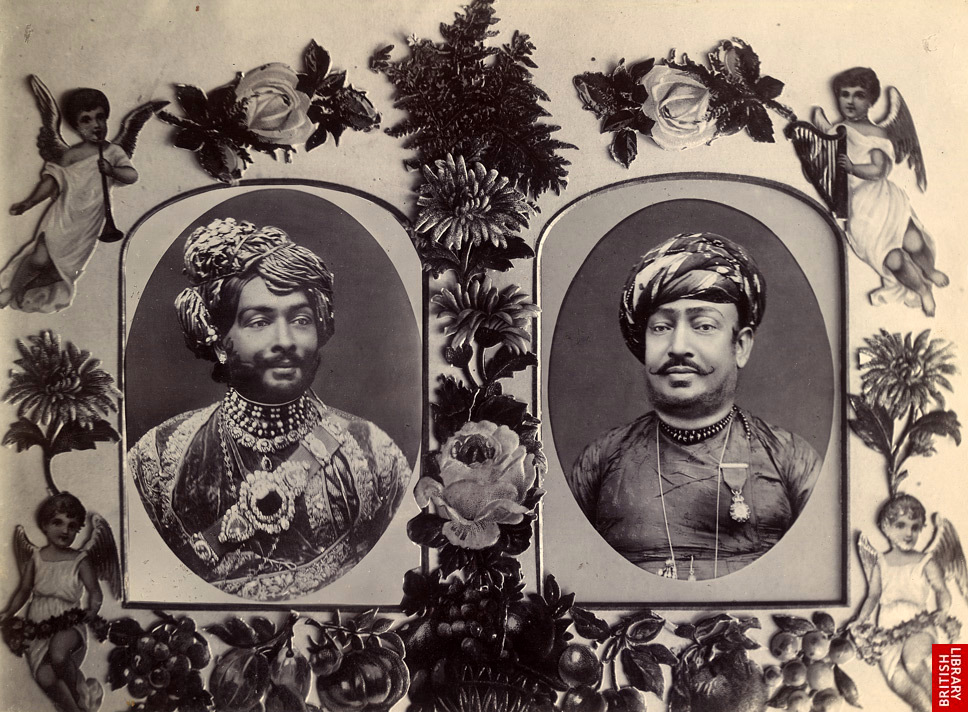
Mohammad Rasul Khanji, Nawab of Junagarh, Bahaduddinbhai Hasainbhai, Wazier, Junagarh, 1890s

== See also ==
- Manavadar State
- V. P. Menon
- Political integration of India
- Pathans of Gujarat
- Junagadh State Railway
