= Baroda and Gujarat States Agency =

Political agency of British India

Coordinates: 22.18°N 73.12°E

- Agency of British India
- 1933–1944
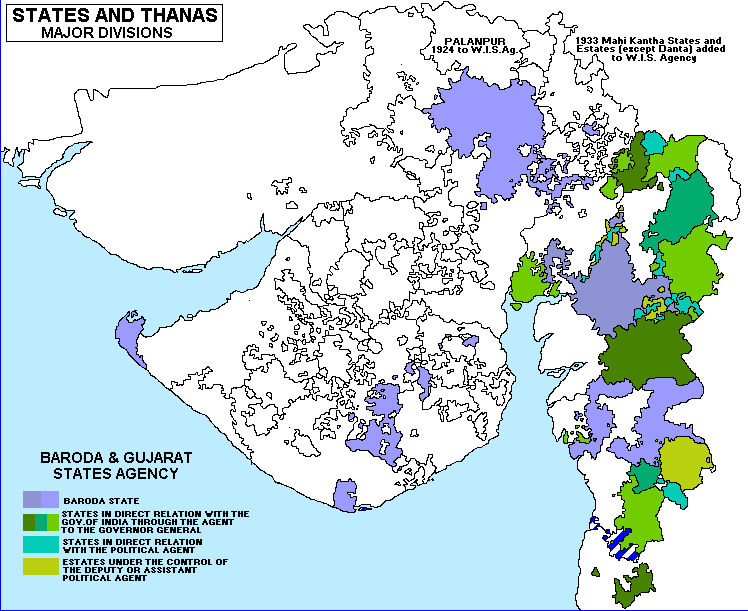
- Map of the area of the Baroda and Gujarat States Agency. The territories of Baroda State are in violet and those of other states in green.
- Area
  - 1931: 42,267 km^{2} (16,319 sq mi)
- Population
  - 1931: 3,760,800
- History
  - Merger of Baroda, Rewa Kantha, Surat and other minor agencies: 1933
  - Formation of the Baroda, Western India and Gujarat States Agency: 1944
Preceded by
Baroda Agency
Rewa Kantha Agency
Surat Agency
Succeeded by
Baroda, Western India and Gujarat States Agency
- "A collection of treaties, engagements, and sunnuds relating to India and neighbouring countries"

Baroda and Gujarat States Agency was a political agency of British India, managing the relations of the British government of the Bombay Presidency with a collection of princely states.

The political agent, who was also Collector of the British District of the Panchmahal, resided at Baroda (Vadodara).

== History ==
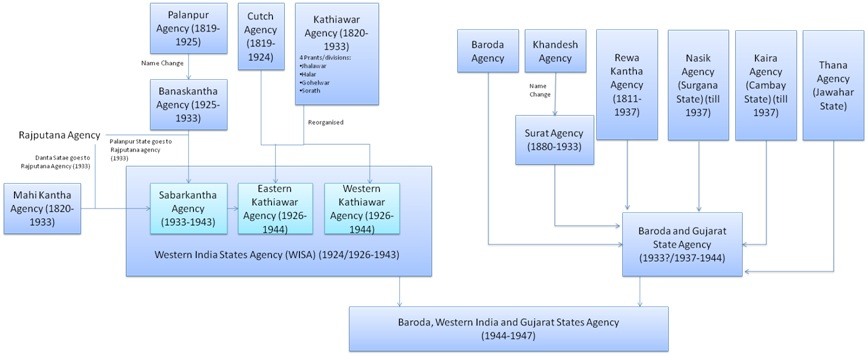
Succession of British Agencies in Gujarat

In 1933, the great Gaekwar Baroda State and other princely states of the Baroda Agency were merged with those of the agencies adjacent to the northern part of the Bombay Presidency, Rewa Kantha Agency, Surat Agency, Nasik Agency, Kaira Agency and Thana Agency, in order to form the Baroda and Gujarat States Agency.

On 5 November 1944 the Baroda and Gujarat States Agency was merged with the Western India States Agency (WISA) to form a larger Baroda, Western India and Gujarat States Agency. At Indian Independence, this would merge into Bombay State, ending up at its split in present Gujarat.

=== The Attachment Scheme ===
The process of the 'attachment scheme' began from 1940 onwards in order to integrate the smallest princely states, estates and thanas. Baroda State was one of the main beneficiaries of this measure by being able to add about 15,000 km^{2} and half a million inhabitants to the state. The merged states were Pethapur on 1 February 1940, the Katosan Thana, with Deloli, Kalsapura, Maguna, Memadpura, Rampura, Ranipura, Tejpura, Varsora, the Palaj Taluka and both Ijpura States between June and July 1940. These were followed on 10 July 1943 by the states of Ambliara, Ghorasar, Ilol, Katosan, Khadal, Patdi, Punadra, Ranasan, Wasoda and Wao Also many small Talukas of the region were merged. On 24 July 1943 Sachodar State and a few small places that had no own jurisdiction were annexed. Finally, by December the small states of Bajana, Bhilka, Malpur, Mansa and Vadia followed suit.

== Princely states ==
The number of separate states was above 80, but most were minor or petty states. Many of them were under British protectorate or at least influence. By far the largest one was Baroda State, which received tribute from many small states. In Kathiawar, only ten more ranked as Salute states. Jafrabad State had formerly been part of the Baroda Agency and was transferred later to the Kathiawar Agency.

The total area of the states the agency dealt with was 42,267 km^{2} (16,319 sq mi). In 1931, their combined population was 3,760,800. Many of the inhabitants were.

=== Former Baroda Agency ===
Salute state :

- Baroda State, title Maharaja Gaekwar, Hereditary salute of 21-guns

Non-salute states :

- Ilol
- Nahara
- Sihora (Gujarat)
- Jambughoda
- Palaj
- Derdi
- Noghavandar
- Vajiria
- Palasni
- Agar
- Mandwa
- Derol
- Vithalgadh
- Bhadli
- Gadhula
- Hapa
- Gad Boriad
- Veja
- Rupal
- Chotila
- Bhilodia
- Dadhalia
- Charkha
- Gabat

=== Former Rewa Kantha Agency ===
Salute states :

- First Class : Rajpipla (Nandod), title Maharaja, Hereditary salute of 13-guns
- Second Class :
  - Bari(y)a (Devgadh), title Maharaol, Hereditary salute of 9-guns (11 personal)
  - Balasinor, title Nawab, Hereditary salute of 9-guns
  - Chhota Udaipur, title Raja, Hereditary salute of 9-guns
  - Lunavada (Lunawada), title Maharana, Hereditary salute of 9-guns
  - Sant (Sunth), title Maharana, Hereditary salute of 9-guns

Non-salute states :

Major Mehwas

- Chhota Udehpur (Mohan), Second Class
- Kadana, Third Class
- Sanjeli, Third Class, title Thakur
- Jambughoda (Narukot), Third Class
- Bhadarva (Bhadarwa), Third Class
- Gad Boriad, Third Class (personal) / Fourth Class
- Mandwa, Third Class (personal) / Fourth Class
- Umet(h)a, Third (personal) / Fourth Class
- Shanor State, Fourth Class
- Vajiria, Fourth Class
- Vanmala, Fourth Class (personal) / Fifth Class
- Nangam, Fifth Class
- Sihora State (Gujarat), Fourth Class
- Pandu, Fifth Class

minor Mehwas (petty (e)states), in two geographical divisions

Sankheda :

- Agar
- Alwa
- Bhilodia :
  - Motisinghji,
  - Chhatarsinghji
- Bihora State
- Chorangla
- Dudhpur
- Chudesar
- Jiral Kamsoli
- Nalia
- Nasvadi
- Palasni
- Pantalavdi :
  - Akbar Khan,
  - Kesar Khan
- Rampura
- Rengan
- Sindhiapura
- Uchad State
- Vadia (Virampura)
- Vasan Sewada State
- Vasan Virpur State
- Vo(h)ra

Pandu (incl. three Dorka estates) :

- Amrapur
- Angadh
- Chhaliar State
- Dhari
- Dodka State
- Gotardi State
- Itwad State
- Jesar
- Jumkha State
- Kasla Paginu Muvadu
- Kanoda State
- Litter Gothda
- Mevli
- Moka Paginu Muvadu
- Moti Varnol
- Nani Varnol
- Poicha State
- Rayka (Raika)
- Rajpur,
- Vakhtapur
- Varnolmal

=== Minor former Agencies ===
==== Former Surat Agency ====
Salute states :

- Dharampur, title Raja, Hereditary salute of 9-guns (11 personal)
- Sachin, title Nawab, Hereditary salute of 9-guns

Non-salute state :

- Bansda

===== Other =====
The Dangs:

- Amala
- Avchar
- Bilbari
- Chinchli Gaded
- Derbhavti
- Gadvi
- Jhari Gharkhadi
- Kirli
- Palasvihir
- Pimpladevi
- Pimpri
- Shivbara
- Vadhyawan
- Vasurna

==== Former Kaira Agency ====
Salute state :

- Cambay, title Nawab, Hereditary salute of 11-guns

==== Former Nasik Agency ====
- Non-salute state : Surgana

==== Former Thana Agency ====
Salute state :

- Jawhar, title Maharaja, Hereditary salute of 9-guns (13 personal and local) in first and second world war

== See also ==
- Bombay Presidency
