= Akbar Khan =

Akbar Khan may refer to:

== Military ==
- Mohammad Akbar Khan (1895–1984), Pakistani general
- Akbar Khan (1912–1993), Pakistani general

== Politics and government ==
- Wazir Akbar Khan (1816–1845), Afghan prince, general and tribal leader involved in the first Anglo-Afghan War
- Muhammad Akbar Khan (politician) (fl. 1920), member of the Punjab Province legislative council
- Akbar Ayub Khan (born 1971), Pakistani politician

== Other people ==
- Akbar Khan (director) (born 1949), Indian film director, producer, writer and actor
- Akbar Khan (disability activist) (born 1962), Indian disability activist
- Akbar Abu Sama Khan, one of the perpetrators of the 1993 Bombay bombings

== Places ==
- Akbar Khan Mehwa, a village and former princely (e)state, part of Pantlavdi, in Pandu, Rewa Kantha, Gujarat, India

== See also ==
- Akbar Ali Khan (disambiguation)
- Ali Akbar Khan (disambiguation)
