= Rewa Kantha Agency =

British Indian political agency

- Agency of British India
- 1811–1937
- Rewa Kantha Agency within Gujarat
- Area
  - 1901: 12,877 km^{2} (4,972 sq mi)
- Population
  - 1901: 479,065
- History
  - Established: 1811
  - Formation of the Baroda and Gujarat States Agency: 1937
Succeeded by
Baroda and Gujarat States Agency

Map of Rewa Kantha Agency with all Princely States

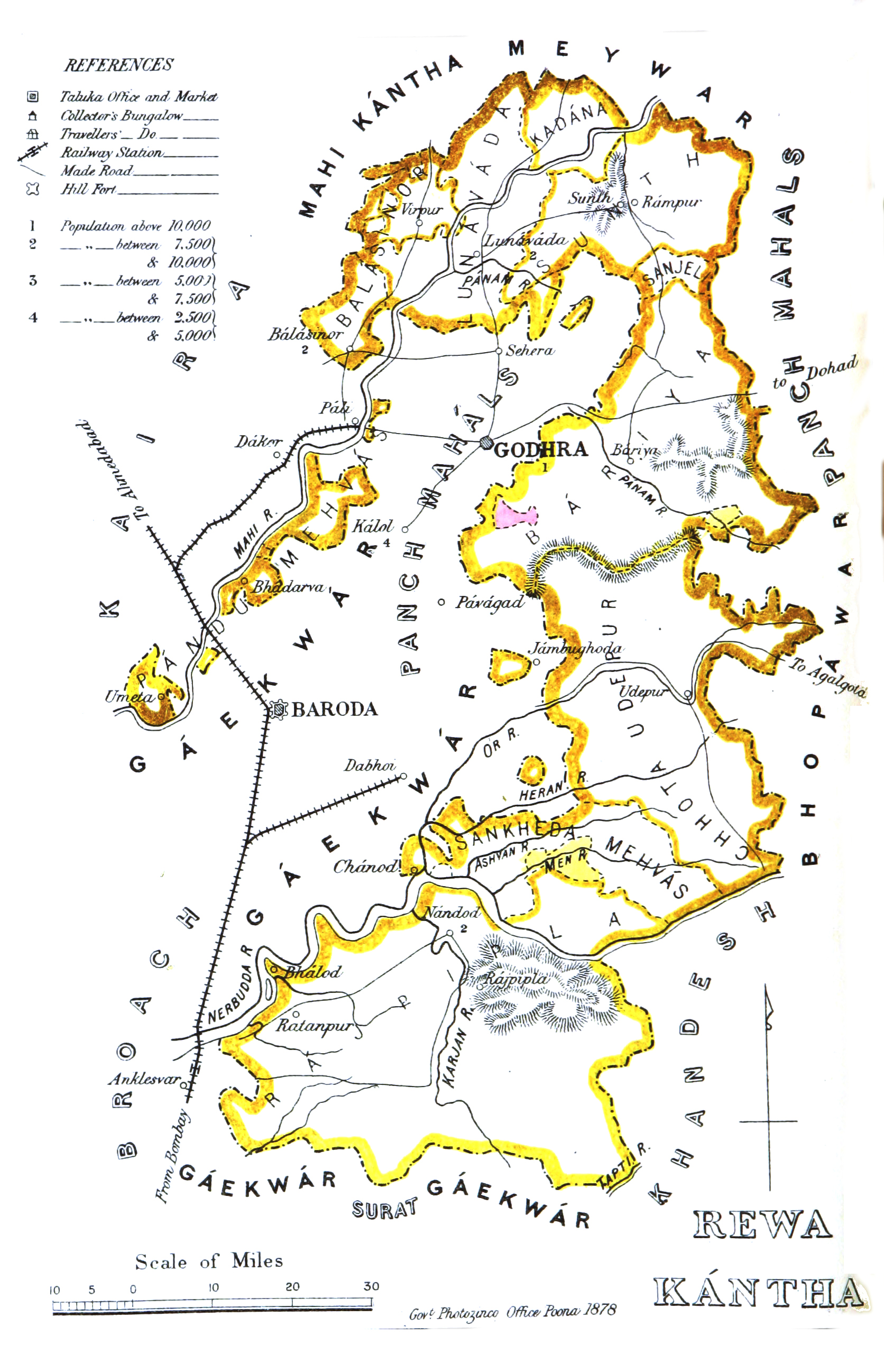
Agency Map (1878)

Rewa Kantha was a political agency of British India, managing the relations (indirect rule) of the British government's Bombay Presidency with a collection of princely states. It stretched for about 150 miles between the plain of Gujarat and the hills of Malwa, from the Tapti River to the Mahi River crossing the Rewa (or Narmada) River, from which it takes its name.

The political agent, who was also District collector of the prant (British District) of the Panchmahal, resided at Godhra.

== History ==
The native states came under British subsidiary alliances after the Third Anglo-Maratha War of the early 19th century.

The total surface was 4,971.75 square miles, comprising 3,412 villages, with a population of 479,055, yielding 2,072,026 Rupees state revenue and paying 147,826 Rupees tribute (mostly to the Gaikwar Baroda State).

In 1937 the princely states of the Rewa Kantha Agency were merged with Baroda State in order to form the Baroda and Gujarat States Agency, which in turn merged in 1944 with the Western India States Agency as Baroda, Western India and Gujarat States Agency.

After the Independence of British India in 1947, split into India and Pakistan, the rulers of the states all agreed to accede to the Government of India and were integrated into Bombay State. Bombay state was split along linguistic lines in 1960, and Rewa Kantha became part of Gujarat, like Saurashtra State.

== Princely States ==
The number of separate states was 61, mostly minor or petty states except for five. Many of them were under British influence; the largest one was Rajpipla.

The Agency also dealt with five first-class states named Chhota Udaipur State, Devgadh Bariya State, Santrampur, Lunawada State and Balasinor State. The total area of the states the agency related to was 12,877 km^{2} (4,972 sq mi). In 1901 their population was 479,065. Many of the inhabitants were Bhils and Kolis.

=== Rewa Kantha division ===
(includes all the main states; in direct relations with the Political Agent at Godhra)

Salute states :

- Rajpipla (Nandod), First Class, title Maharaja, Hereditary salute of 13-guns
- Bari(y)a (Devgadh), Second Class, title Maharaol, Hereditary salute of 9-guns (11-guns personal)
- Lunavada, Second Class, title Maharana, Hereditary salute of 9-guns
- Balasinor, Second Class, title Nawab, Hereditary salute of 9-guns
- Sant (Sunth) (Rampur), Second Class, title Maharana, Hereditary salute of 9-guns
- Chhota Udepur, First Class, title Maharaja Maharawal, Hereditary Salute of 11 - guns

Non-salute states :

- Kadana, Third Class
- Sanjeli, Third Class
- Jambughoda (Narukot), Third Class

=== Mehwas ===
Only non-salute states: two geographical groups of minor or petty rural (e)states

==== Sankheda ====
(near Narmada River)

- Mandwa, Third Class (personal) / Fourth Class
- Gad Boriad, Third Class (personal) / Fourth Class
- Shanor, Fourth Class
- Vajiria, Fourth Class
- Vanmala, Fourth Class (personal) / Fifth Class
- Nangam, Fifth Class
- Uchad,
- Agar,
- Palasni,
- Khareda,
- Borkhad,
- Bhilodia :
  - Motisinghji,
  - Chhatarsinghji,
- Vasan Virpur,
- Vora,
- Vasan Sewada,
- Virampura
- Alwa,
- Chorangla State,
- Sindhiapura,
- Bihora State,
- Vadia (Virampura),
- Dudhpur,
- Rampura,
- Jiral Kamsoli,
- Chudesar State,
- Pantalavdi :
  - Akbar Khan,
  - Kesar Khan,
- Rengan,
- Nalia,
- Nasvadi

==== Pandu ====
(near Mahi River; all paying tribute to the Gaekwar Baroda State):

- Bhadarwa, Third Class
- Umetha, Third (personal) / Fourth Class
- Sihora (Gujarat) Fourth Class
- Pandu, Fifth Class
- Chhaliar State,
- Mevli,
- Kanoda,
- Poicha,
- Dhari,
- Itwad,
- Gotardi,
- Litter Gothda State,
- Amrapur,
- Vakhtapur,
- Jesar,
- Moka Paginu Muvadu,
- Kasla Paginu Muvadu,
- Rajpur,
- Moti Varnol,
- Nahara
- Jumkha,
- Nani Varnol,
- Varnolmal,
- Angadh,

the Dorka (e)states

- Dodka,
- Angadh,
- Rayka (Raika),

== Fiscal Stamps ==
In addition to those of Rewa Kantha Agency itself, revenue and/or court fee stamps were issued for the following native states :

in the Rewa Kantha Division (all)

1. Rajpipla
2. Balasinor
3. Baria
4. Lunavada
5. Sant
6. Chhota Udaipur
7. Jambughoda
8. Kadana
9. Sanjeli

in the Sankheda Mehwas (only these)

1. Gad Boriad
2. Naswadi
3. Shanor
4. Vajiria

in the Pandu Mehwas (only these)

1. Bhadarva
2. Pandu Mewas
3. Umeta
4. Bakrol (Boru)

== See also ==
- Bombay Presidency
- List of Koli states and clans

== Sources and external links ==
- Imperial Gazetteer, on DSAL - Rewa Kantha Agency
