= Vadia =

Vadia can refer to:

- A Portuguese word meaning Prostitute
- Vadia (Narmada), village in Narmada district, Gujarat, India
- Vadia, Saurashtra, census town in Amreli district, Gujarat, India
- Vadia, Banaskantha, village in Banaskantha district, Gujarat, India
