= Jambughoda Wildlife Sanctuary =

Wildlife samctuary in India

Coordinates: 22.3667°N 73.7167°E

- IUCN category IV (habitat/species management area)
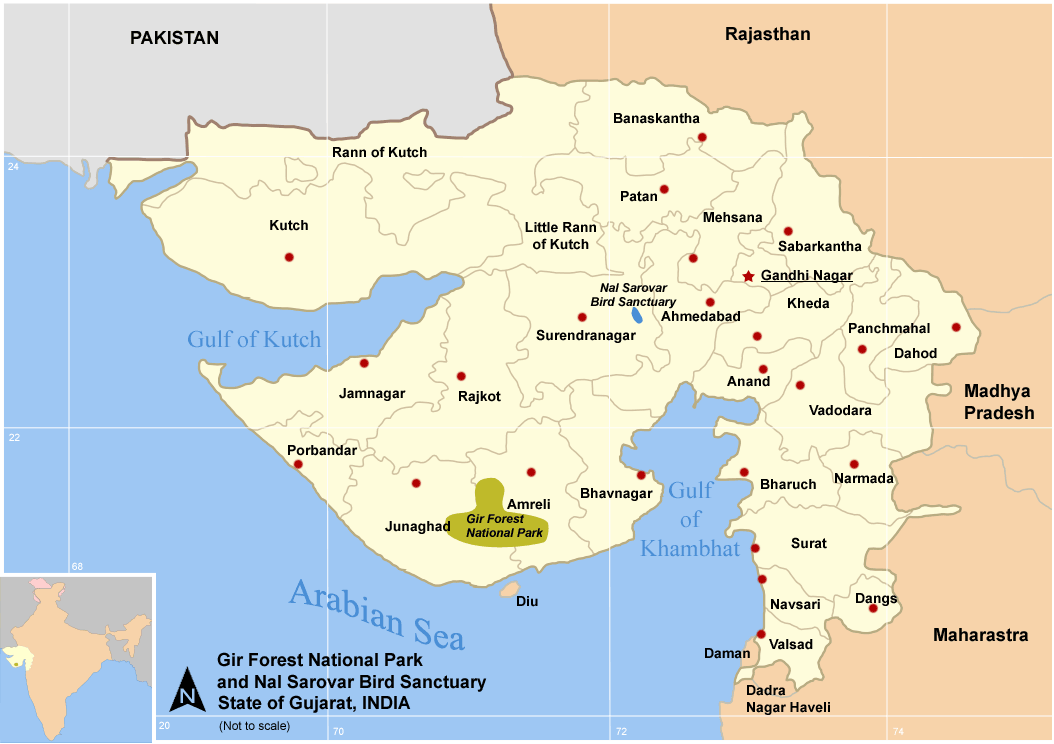
- Map of Gujarat showing places like Gir Forest and Panchmahal District (where Jambughoda is located).
- Interactive map of Jambughoda Wildlife Sanctuary
- Location: Jambughoda, Panchmahal, Gujarat, India
- Nearest city: Vadodara
- Area: 542.08
- Established: 7 August, 1989
- Governing body: Forest Department of Gujarat

Jambughoda is a Wildlife Sanctuary situated in Jambughoda Tehsil, in the South-Central part of Gujarat, and the Khathiar-Gir dry deciduous forests' ecoregion in India. It is located 70 km from Vadodara and 20 km from prominent tourist places such as Pawagadh and Champaner.

== History and geography ==
Located in the Panchmahal district of Central Gujarat and 130.38 km^{2}. area declared as a sanctuary in May 1990, Jambughoda Wildlife Sanctuary is home for a variety of animals and plants. A small part of the sanctuary (Targol Round) falls in the adjoining Vadodara district. The area has two water reservoirs – one at Kada and the other at Targol. These water bodies add to the aesthetic settings and diversity of the habitat. The sanctuary's wildlife depends on these two reservoirs.

The most striking feature of the area is the undulating hills having a good forest cover, with the valleys having small human settlements. The places of interest are Kada, Targol and Jhand Hanuman temple. Of these, the most picturesque location is Kada, where a beautiful forest rest house stands on the banks of an irrigation reservoir. Due to its proximity to the cosmopolitan city of Vadodara, the sanctuary is an ideal resort and camping site for the city's people.

People of the area are mainly tribal. There are 25 villages (including 5 villages inside the Sanctuary) which are distributed among five forest blocks and two ranges. Local tribals collect minor forest produce from the area for their livelihood. People also allow grazing of their livestock and cut wood in the forest. The status of the management of the PA is good, but needs to be improved by taking up habitat steps, so that animals can be provisioned with adequate food, water and shelter. Grazing and wood removed by local people and fire in the forest cause damage to the habitat. Local people encroach upon the land of the PA and hence the area needs to be re-demarcated.

=== Jambughoda State ===
The area was a part of the princely state of Jambughoda prior to independence. Within India, it was a part of the Bombay Province during the British Raj. Its rulers belonged to the Parmar dynasty and took the title of Thakur Sahib. The last ruler was Ranjitsinhji Gambhirsinhji (b. 1892) who reigned from 27 Sep 1917 to 15 Aug 1947.

== Flora ==
It is a forest of teak, bamboo and other miscellaneous species. Flora here include Sag, sadad, shisham, khair, mahuda, bamboos, timru, bor, dhav, bili and dudhalo.

== Fauna ==
Jambughoda Wildlife Sanctuary hosts 17 mammalian species including large colonies of Indian flying fox. Indian giant squirrel was photographed for the first time in March 2016. A rusty-spotted cat was sighted in October 2013 preying on a bat.

Among the other carnivores are the hyena, wolf and jackal. The Indian sloth bear is occasionally reported from the area. Besides civets, mongoose, porcupine and several species of rodents are found in the area. The area has also many varieties of reptiles as well, which include many venomous and non-venomous snakes. The python, crocodile and other herpetofauna also exist here. Birdlife is plentiful. In the past, the junglefowl was abundant here, but the species is now exterminated from the area, or has become rare. The barking deer, four horned antelope, Blue bull and wild boar are the ungulates occurring in the sanctuary.

== Places of interest around Jambughoda ==
- Champaner - UNESCO — World Heritage site
- Pavagadh - Pilgrimage centre
- Sukhi Dam
- Kada Dam
- Jand Hanuman
- Hathini Mata Dhodh

== Transport ==
The nearest airports are in Vadodara (90 km) and Ahmedabad (180 km. approx.). The nearest bus stations are in Shivrajpur (1 km) and Bodeli (12 km). The nearest railway station is in Vadodara, and Bodeli too.

== See also ==
- Gir Forest
- Shoolpaneshwar Wildlife Sanctuary
