= Amrapur State (Rewa Kantha) =

Village in Gujarat state, India

- Princely State of British India
- 1948
- Location of Amrapur
- Area
  - 1931: 5.18 km^{2} (2.00 sq mi)
- Population
  - 1931: 407
Succeeded by
India

Amrapur State was a minor princely state during the British Raj in what is today Gujarat State India. It was initially administered by the Rewa Kantha Agency and then by the Baroda and Gujarat States Agency. It was part of the 26 Princely States making up the Pandu Mehwas, petty states placed under British protection between 1812 and 1825. The state had a population of 407 and an area of 2 sq miles. The capital was the modern village of Amrapur, Jamnagar district. Not to be confused with Amrapur State (Kathiawar).

== Rulers ==
The state was held by several shareholders (several people sharing the government and revenues of the state).

Between at least 1922 and 1927 the four shareholders of Amrapur were:

- Prabhatsing Sivsing (b. 1876)
- Amarsing Bhulabjai (b. 1886)
- Somabhai Ramsing (b. 1896)
- Abhersing Gabhirbhai (b. 1889)
