= Litter Gothda State =

Village in Gujarat state, India

- Princely State of British India
- 1948
- Location of Litter Gothda
- Area
  - 1931: 10.36 km^{2} (4.00 sq mi)
- Population
  - 1931: 1,450
Succeeded by
India

Litter Gothda State was a minor princely state during the British Raj in what is today Gujarat State India. It was initially administered by the Rewa Kantha Agency and then by the Baroda and Gujarat States Agency. It was part of the 26 Princely States making up the Pandu Mehwas, petty states placed under British protection between 1812 and 1825. The state had a population of 1450 and an area of 4 sq miles

== Rulers ==
The state was held by several shareholders (several people sharing the government and revenues of the state).

Between at least 1922 and 1927 the 4 shareholders of Litter Gothda were:

- Jeebhai Dala (b. 1874)
- Natha Mathiji (b. 1881)
- Gaba Kala (b. 1889)
- Moti Gulab (b. 1834)

in 1927 the two additional shareholders of Litter Gothda were:

- Abasali Bakarali
- Rahemumia Kasamali
