= Jambughoda State =

Coordinates: 22.3667°N 73.7167°E

Jambughoda State જાંબુઘોડા / जम्बुगोधा
- Princely State of British India
- Late 14th century–1948
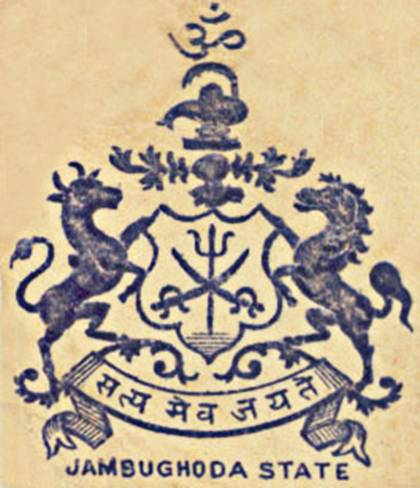
- Flag Coat of arms

- Jambughoda State (in centre) within Rewa Kantha Agency, British India
- Capital: Jambughoda
- Area
  - 1901: 370 km^{2} (140 sq mi)
- Population
  - 1901: 11,385
- History
  - Established: Late 14th century
  - Accession to the Union of India: 1948
| Succeeded by |
| India |

Jambughoda State, previously known as Narukot and Tokalpur state, was a small princely state in India during the time of the British Raj. Its last ruler acceded to the Union of India on 10 June 1948.

Jambughoda State had an area of 370 km^{2} and a population of 11385 in 1931. It was bounded by Baria State in the north, Baroda State in the south and Chhota Udaipur State in the east.

Jambughoda State fell under the Baroda Agency of the Bombay Presidency, later integrated into the Baroda and Gujarat States Agency. It was located in a tribal dominated area, with the Naikda and the Koli people as the main groups. Its capital was at Jambughoda town in present-day Gujarat state, India.

== History ==
Jambughoda State was established towards the end of the 14th century by Thakore Vachhaji, a descendant of the Malwa ruling dynasty. From the mid-tenth century, Malwa had been ruled by the Paramaras, who established a capital at Dhar. King Bhoj, who ruled from about 1010 to 1060, was known as the great polymath philosopher-king of medieval India. Under his rule Malwa became an intellectual centre of India. His successors ruled until about 1305, when Malwa was conquered by the Delhi Sultanate.

In 1826 Jambughoda State became a British protectorate. Between 1829 and 1838 the territory was occupied by Baroda State, becoming a British protectorate again in 1849.

The Thakur Sahib of Jambughoda was one of the original constituents of the Chamber of Princes an institution established in 1920. He exercised considerable civil and criminal jurisdiction. The progressive and efficient administration of the state of Jambughoda exempted it from being merged during the attachment scheme of 1943. The last ruler was Ranjitsinhji Gambhirsinhji (b. 1892) who reigned from 27 Sep 1917 to 15 Aug 1947.

=== Rulers ===
The state was ruled by Kshatriya Kolis belonging to the Parmar dynasty and took the title of Thakor And Rana Sahib.

=== Thakor Sahibs ===
- .... – 1820: Amarsinghji
- 1820 – 1870: Jagatsinhji
- 1870 – 1911: Dipsinhji Jagatsinhji (b. 1841 – d. 1911)
- 1911 – 27 Sep 1917: Gambhirsimhji (d. 1917)

== See also ==
- Political integration of India
- Jawhar State
- Koli
