= A. A. Khan =

A. A. Khan may refer to:

- A. A. Khan (academic) (born 1947), Vice Chancellor of Ranchi University (India)
- Aftab Ahmed Khan, Indian politician and police officer
- Aziz Ahmed Khan (born 1943), Pakistan's former High Commissioner to India 2003–2006
- Aziz Ahmed Khan (politician) (born 1978), Indian politician from Assam

== See also ==
- Akbar Ali Khan (disambiguation)
- Ali Akbar Khan (disambiguation)
