= Ali Akbar Khan (disambiguation) =

Ali Akbar Khan (1922–2009) was an Indian classical musician.

Ali Akbar Khan may also refer to:

- Ali-Akbar Shahnazi (1897–1985), Iranian musician
- Chaudhry Ali Akbar Khan (1910–1967), Pakistani politician and diplomat
- Ali Akbar Fateh Khan, fictional police officer in the Dhoom franchise of Indian films, played by Uday Chopra

== See also ==
- Akbar Ali Khan (disambiguation)
- Akbar Khan (disambiguation)
- Ali Akbar (disambiguation)
- A. A. Khan (disambiguation)
- Ali Akbar Khan College of Music, founded by the Indian musician
