= Ali Akbar, Iran =

Ali Akbar (Persian: علي اكبر) may refer to:

- Ali Akbar, East Azerbaijan
- Ali Akbar, Kermanshah
