= Raika =

Raika may refer to:

== People ==
- Raika Fujii (藤井 来夏; born 1974), Japanese former synchronized swimmer
- Emiko Raika (来家 恵美子; born 1975), Japanese female professional boxer and mixed martial artist

== Places ==
- Raika State, was a minor princely state during the British Raj
- Rayka Mehwa, a village and former princely state in Gujarat, western India

== Others ==
- Raika, an ancient title used by the kings of the Doti Kingdom in the western Himalayas of Nepal
- Raika Dōmei, a group of three Japanese photographers
- Rabari or Raika, an camel herder community, mainly in Rajasthan, Gujarat, Haryana, Punjab and Sindh
