= Shroffs Foundation Trust =

Non-governmental organization

Shroffs Foundation Trust (SFT) is a regional non-governmental organization primarily working in Vadodara district and a part of Kutch district in Gujarat, India.

It was established in 1980 under the Bombay Public Trust Act 1950 to improve the lives of impoverished communities in the region through holistic sustainable development. SFT has been involved in provision of livelihood security, drudgery reduction, natural resource management, health and education.

In the year 2010–11, SFT derived 45% of their funds from government grants, 28% from donations and 27% from other sources.

== Livelihood ==
SFT has carried out various projects to help communities achieve greater economic independence through community organization and capacity building.

Widows hold a vulnerable position in the conservative society of rural India, to make them self-sufficient SFT trained 269 young widows in various businesses such as artificial jewellery making, cleaning agent making, stitching and embroidery. After training, 66% of the widows became self-sufficient.

Another similar initiative taken by SFT was establishing a sustainable handicraft business run by the tribal women artisans. After three successful years of business, today their earnings have increased from Rs 6 per hour to Rs 14 per hour. This cooperative setup aims to empower more and more women by helping them have a steady source of income.

Women in the region have begun the practice of dairy cooperatives allowing them to price milk higher via capacity building programs organized by Self Help Groups (SHG's) established by SFT. The co-operative has provided saving opportunities, which resulted in a profit accumulation of Rs 50,000 in one year. Furthermore, SFT has acted as a surety for the microcredit loans undertaken by the women for purchasing milk cattle under the program. Subsequently, the daily additional income of 348 families in the region linked to these co-operatives has increased to Rs 84,363. Nevertheless, the program had to counter illiteracy problems that barricaded the community from viewing the benefits of a cooperative and resulted in conflicts and thus, caused time lags in implementation.

SFT established a vocational training center in 2008 in Chhota Udepur. The center aims to equip 8,900 youths living in the tribal belts of Gujarat with skills to employ them in back-end office operations in BPOs. Initially participation in the courses was challenged by factors such as unawareness of the community of outlets such as BPOs and the degree of difficulty involved in learning English from the basics. However, these were eventually resolved through continued effort of volunteers. and to date 175 trainees have received successful placements and are earning an average income of Rs 5000 per month.

== Drudgery reduction ==
The uneducated community has been prone to drudgery in the domestic and agricultural fields. Farm mechanization and safe drinking water has reduced drudgery of women providing time for other income generation activities. SFT addressed the issues of access to safe drinking water through the introduction of a water distribution system (watershed project.) in 127 villages in the region, thereby, reaching out to 25,000 households.

In addition, SFT observed heavy reliance on labour-intensive means of farming which was tackled by the initiation of the Tool Bank Project in 2010. Women spent on an average 15 or 16 hours a day in farm related chores like sowing and winnowing. To increase productivity, SFT introduced mechanization through tractors, maize shellers and mini mills, which benefited 1,050 farmers.

SFT has also provided means for farmers to avail agro-services through the promotion of social enterprises such as Agrocel Industries Ltd in order to help increase their crop yields. This has been executed through the free provision of skilled technical guidance by the enterprise and access to superior inputs at affordable prices. Consequently, this helped decrease the time and resources spent on menial work for around 2,000 farmers.

== Constraints ==
Since the SFT's target group is the rural and tribal community, one of the biggest limitations faced by them was the internal conflict between groups due to entrenched attitudes of the people. Moreover, political interference, extensive and burdensome government procedures, and administrative delays by state departments hindered the implementation of the NGO's programmes. Lastly, additional time lags were triggered by the unwillingness of the people to partake in the activities owing to their inability to understand the benefits of the programmes and disagreements on selection of sites or participants.
