= Chudesar State =

Village in Gujarat state, India

- Princely State of British India
- 1948
- Location of Chudesar
- Area
  - 1931: 6.475 km^{2} (2.500 sq mi)
- Population
  - 1931: 644
Succeeded by
India

Chudesar State was a minor princely state during the British Raj in what is today Gujarat State India. It was initially administered by the Rewa Kantha Agency and then by the Baroda and Gujarat States Agency. It was part of the 28 Princely States making up the Sankheda Mehwas, estates dating from the fall of Pawagadh in 1484, by Rajputts settling on the south of the territory near the town of Sankheda, from which the Sankheda Mehwas derive their name. The state had a population of 644 and an area of 2.5 sq miles

== History ==
The state of Baroda had imposed a tribute on the Sankheda Mewas, it's extraction causing British intervention in 1822, brokering an agreement where the Gaekwar received tribute from the states, while their independence was recognised by Baroda, which also promised to respect the petty states' rights.

== Rulers ==
The Ruler held the title of Thakur. The state was held by several shareholders (several people sharing the government and revenues of the state).

In 1922 the six shareholders of Chudesar were:

- Thakur Kesarkhan Bhaibawa (b. 1872) fl. 1922-1927
- Thakur Badbarkhan Chitabawa (b. 1897) fl. 1922-1927
- Thakur Kesarkhan Rahimkhan (b. 1868) fl. 1922-1927
- Thakur Kayamkhan Jilabawa (b. 1866) fl. 1922-1927
- Thakur Naherkhan Alamkhan (b. 1893) fl. 1922-1927
- Thakur Chandabawa Sherbai (b. 1857) fl. 1922
- Chhitbha Vajbha (replaced the above by 1927)
