= Moka Paginu Muvadu State =

Indian princely state

- Princely State of British India
- 1948
- Location of Moka Paginu Muvadu
- Area
  - 1931: 2.59 km^{2} (1.00 sq mi)
- Population
  - 1931: 207
Succeeded by
India

Moka Paginu Muvadu State (or Moka Pagina Muvadu, Moka Paginu Muwada ) was a minor princely state during the British Raj in what is today Gujarat State India. It was initially administered by the Rewa Kantha Agency and then by the Baroda and Gujarat States Agency. It was part of the 26 Princely States making up the Pandu Mehwas, petty states placed under British protection between 1812 and 1825. The state had a population of 207 and an area of 1 sq mile.

== Rulers ==
The Rulers held the title of Thakur. The state was held by a variety of shareholders (several people sharing the government and revenues of the state).

In 1922 and 1927 the 2 shareholder of Moka Paginu Muvadu were:

- Mabhaj Gembhai (b. 1863)
- Ramsing Nathabhai (b. 1896)
