= Chhaliar State =

Village in Gujarat state, India

- Princely State of British India
- 1948
- Location of Chhaliar
- Area
  - 1931: 28.49 km^{2} (11.00 sq mi)
- Population
  - 1931: 2,946
Succeeded by
India

Chhaliar State was a minor princely state during the British Raj in what is today Gujarat State India. It was initially administered by the Rewa Kantha Agency and then by the Baroda and Gujarat States Agency. It was part of the 26 Princely States making up the Pandu Mehwas, petty states placed under British protection between 1812 and 1825. The state had a population of 2 946 and an area of 28.49 square kilometres (11.00 mi^{2}).

== Rulers ==
The Rulers held the title of Thakur.

- Rawal Chhatrasinghji Rasinghji (b. 1863) 7 August 1888-fl. 1915.
- Thakur Shri Ramsinhji Indrasinhji (b. 24 December 1913) 18 November 1918-fl. 1940.
