= Pethapur State =

Princely state of the Mahi Kantha Agency, Bombay Presidency

Coordinates: 23°13′N 72°33′E

- Princely State of British India
- 13th century–1940
- Capital: Pethapur
- Area
  - 1901: 29 km^{2} (11 sq mi)
- Population
  - 1901: 5,616
- History
  - Established: 13th century
  - Attachment Scheme and merger with Baroda State: 1940
Succeeded by
Baroda State

Pethapur State was a small princely state belonging to the Mahi Kantha Agency of the Bombay Presidency during the era of the British Raj. It was centered on Pethapur village, in present-day Gandhinagar district of Gujarat State, a place renowned for block-making.

== History ==
The 13th century, King Pethasinh of Pethapur ruled over Shertha town. After the death of parmar Pethasinh, the Gujarat Sultanate of Patan used this land as battle ground. Sultan Ahmed Shah decided to move his capital from Patan to a new city, and built Ahmedabad. In 1960, Bombay state was split in two different states, Gujarat and Maharashtra. Ahmedabad became capital of Gujarat, and a new capital city was to be built on land which was once part of Pethapur state.

The state was ruled by the Vaghela dynasty of Rajputs. Rawal Virajmal, son of Rao Kiratsinghji of Idar State, was succeeded on 12 April 1882 by his son Rawal Dipsinhji Sheosinhji, born in 1863.

On 1 February 1940 Pethapur State became the first petty princely state to be subject to the Attachment Scheme, being integrated with Baroda State. The last ruler was Fateh Singh, born 3 October 1895 who nominally ruled till Indian independence while the process for joining India was active. Finally Baroda State acceded to the Indian Union on 1 May 1949.

=== Rulers ===
The rulers of Pethapur State bore the title Bapu, Thakor.

- c. 1650 – .... Punj Singh
- c. 1700 – .... Ranchhod Singh (son)
- 1700 – 1800 (unknown number of successors)
- after 1800–.... Ade Singh
- .... – 1861 Bhawan Singh
- 1861 – 1879 Himat Singh (son)
- 1879 – 1896 Gambhir Singh (son)
- 1896 – 1948 Shri Fateh Singh (son) (has issue)

== See also ==
- List of Rajput dynasties and states
- Baroda and Gujarat States Agency
- Political integration of India
