= Dudhpur =

Village in Gujarat state, India

- Princely State of British India
- 1948
- Location of Dudhpur
- Area
  - 1931: 4.5325 km^{2} (1.7500 sq mi)
- Population
  - 1931: 129
Succeeded by
India

Dudhpur was a minor princely state during the British Raj in what is today Gujarat State India. It was initially administered by the Rewa Kantha Agency and then by the Baroda and Gujarat States Agency. It was part of the 28 Princely States making up the Sankheda Mehwas, estates dating from the fall of Pawagadh in 1484, by Rajputts settling on the south of the territory near the town of Sankheda, from which the Sankheda Mehwas derive their name. The state had a population of 129 and an area of 1.75 sq miles

== History ==
The state of Baroda had imposed a tribute on the Sankheda Mewas, it's extraction causing British intervention in 1822, brokering an agreement where the Gaekwar received tribute from the states, while their independence was recognised by Baroda, which also promised to respect the petty states' rights. The state had a yearly revenue of £30 and paid the Gaekwar of Baroda a tribute of £3 10s

== Rulers ==
The Ruler held the title of Thakur.

- Thakur Umedbawa Dulabawa – November 18, 1888
- Thakur Anopsinghji Dadabawa (b. 1879) November 18, 1888 – fl. 1940. Grandson of his predecessor.
