= Varnolmal State =

Princely state

- Princely State of British India
- 1948
- Location of Varnolmal
- Area
  - 1931: 9.065 km^{2} (3.500 sq mi)
- Population
  - 1931: 684
Succeeded by
India

Varnol Mal State (or Varnolmal) was a minor princely state during the British Raj in what is today Gujarat State India. It was initially administered by the Rewa Kantha Agency and then by the Baroda and Gujarat States Agency It was part of the 26 Princely States making up the Pandu Mehwas, petty states placed under British protection between 1812 and 1825. The State had a population of 684 and an area of 3.5 sq miles.

== History ==
The minor princely state, belonging to the Pandu Mehwas division of Rewa Kantha.

In 1901 it comprised also a second village, covering 3 1/2 square miles, with a combined population of 426, yielding 1,094 Rupees state revenue (1903–4, nearly all from land), paying 65 Rupees tribute, to the Gaekwar Baroda State.

== Rulers ==
The state was held by several shareholders.

- Kalubhai Jesanghbai (b. 1876) fl.1922-fl. 1927
- Fakirbhai Parbatsing (b. 1878) fl. 1922-fl. 1927

== See also ==
- Varnoli Moti, neighboring princely state
- Varnoli Nani, neighboring princely state
