= Mevli State =

Princely state in Gujarat, India

- Princely State of British India
- 1948
- Location of Mevli
- Area
  - 1931: 2.59 km^{2} (1.00 sq mi)
- Population
  - 1931: 207
| Succeeded by |
| India |

Mevli State was a minor princely state during the British Raj in what is today Gujarat State India. It was initially administered by the Rewa Kantha Agency and then by the Baroda and Gujarat States Agency. It was part of the 26 Princely States making up the Pandu Mehwas, petty states placed under British protection between 1812 and 1825. The state had a population of 1702 and an area of 5 sq miles.

== Rulers ==
The Rulers held the title of Thakur. The state was held by a variety of shareholders.

In 1922 the 3 shareholder of Mevli were:

- Chauhan Samatsang Dhembhi (b. 1893)
- Andarsang Gamirsang (b. 1858)
- Bhemsing Dajibhai (b. 1897)

In 1927 the 3 shareholders of Mevli were:

- Chauhan Sadansing Samatsing (b. ca. 1917)
- Andarsang Gamirsang (b. 1858)
- Bhemsing Dajibhai (b. 1897)
