= Sihora State (Gujarat) =

Princely state

- Princely State of British India
- 1948
- Location of Sihora
- Area
  - 1931: 40.145 km^{2} (15.500 sq mi)
- Population
  - 1931: 4 532
Succeeded by
India

Sihora State was a minor princely state during the British Raj in what is today Gujarat State India. It was initially administered by the Rewa Kantha Agency and then by the Baroda and Gujarat States Agency It was part of the 26 Princely States making up the Pandu Mehwas, petty states placed under British protection between 1812 and 1825. The state had a population of 4 532 and an area of 15.5 sq miles. It is not to be confused with Sihora in Madhya Pradesh.

== Rulers ==
The Rulers held the title of Thakur.

- Thakur Naharvarsinghji (b. 1878) fl. 1893 -fl. 1900
- Thakur Khusalsinghi Kashalsinghi (b. 15 June 1883) 28 April 1906-fl. 1909
- Thakur Ranmatsinji (b. 1902) 21 May 1910-fl. 1915
- Thakur Shri Mansinhji Karansinhji (b. November 1907) 22 August 1924-fl. 1939
