= Banknote of Ambliara =

A single banknote was issued by the Indian Princely State of Ambliara. It is undated. It is also a very rare note.

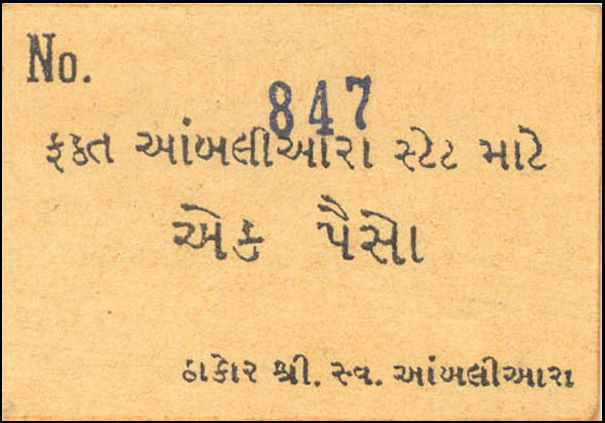
Ambliara State banknote, front

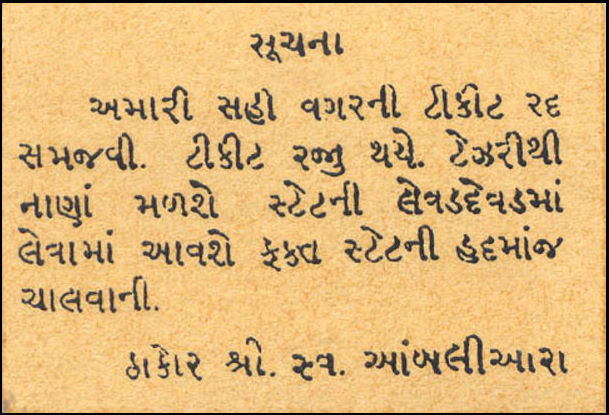
Ambliara State banknote, back

== Catalogue number ==
PS201. 1 paisa (1 pice). ND. Black text on brown pressboard.

== See also ==
- Ambliara State
