= Jumkha State =

Village in Gujarat state, India

- Princely State of British India
- 1948
- Location of Jumkha
- Area
  - 1931: 2.59 km^{2} (1.00 sq mi)
- Population
  - 1931: 372
Succeeded by
India

Jumkha State was a minor princely state during the British Raj in what is today Gujarat State India. It was initially administered by the Rewa Kantha Agency and then by the Baroda and Gujarat States Agency. It was part of the 26 Princely States making up the Pandu Mehwas, petty states placed under British protection between 1812 and 1825. The state had a population of 372 and an area of 1 sq mile.

== Rulers ==
The Ruler held the title of Thakur.

- Becharbha Baryal (b. 1836) fl. 1893-fl. 1900
- Raising Chandrasing (b. 1880) June 1, 1904-fl. 1940
