= Kanoda State =

Village in Gujarat state, India

- Princely State of British India
- 1948
- Location of Kanoda
- Area
  - 1931: 9.7125 km^{2} (3.7500 sq mi)
- Population
  - 1931: 1,387
Succeeded by
India

Kanoda State was a minor princely state during the British Raj in what is today Gujarat State India. It was initially administered by the Rewa Kantha Agency and then by the Baroda and Gujarat States Agency. It was part of the 26 Princely States making up the Pandu Mehwas, petty states placed under British protection between 1812 and 1825. The state had a population of 1387 and an area of 3.75 sq miles.

== Rulers ==
The state was held by several shareholders (several people sharing the government and revenues of the state).

Between 1922 and 1927 the 3 shareholders of Kanoda were:

- Fatehsing Kubersing (b. 1907)
- Thackerani Bijiba (b. 1856)
- Jivabhai Sisving (b. 1879)
