= Raika State =

Princely state during the British Raj

- Princely State of British India
- 1948
- Location of Raika
- Area
  - 1931: 7.77 km^{2} (3.00 sq mi)
- Population
  - 1931: 554
Succeeded by
India

Raika State was a minor princely state during the British Raj in what is today Gujarat State India. It was initially administered by the Rewa Kantha Agency and then by the Baroda and Gujarat States Agency. It was part of the 26 Princely States making up the Pandu Mehwas, petty states placed under British protection between 1812 and 1825. The state had a population of 554 and an area of 3 sq miles.

Raika is located in the Vadodara taluka of Vadodara district of Gujarat, and is part of the Vadodara metropolitan region.

== History ==
The non-salute state was the major one of the three Dorka states (part of the Pandu Mehwas, under the colonial Rewa Kantha Agency), the other two being Donka itself and Angadh. It was ruled by Rajput Chieftains and covered three square miles with a population of 474 in 1901, yielding a state revenue of 3,609 Rupees (1903–4; nearly all from land) and paying 443 Rupees tribute to the Gaikwar Baroda State.

== Rulers ==
The Rulers held the title of Thakur. The state was held by several shareholders.

In 1922 the 2 shareholders of Raika were:

- Natwarsing Motising (born c. 1917)
- Pagedaranbai Laxmibai (born 1857)

In 1927 the 2 shareholders of Raika were:

- Natwarsing Motising (born c. 1917)
- Appajirao Krishnarao (born c. 1889)
