= Dhari State =

Village in Gujarat state, India

- Princely State of British India
- 1948
- Location of Dhari
- Area
  - 1931: 9.7125 km^{2} (3.7500 sq mi)
- Population
  - 1931: 1,454
Succeeded by
India

Dhari State was a minor princely state during the British Raj in what is today Gujarat State India. It was initially administered by the Rewa Kantha Agency and then by the Baroda and Gujarat States Agency. It was part of the 26 Princely States making up the Pandu Mehwas, petty states placed under British protection between 1812 and 1825. The state had a population of 1454 and an area of 3.75 sq miles.

== Rulers ==
The state was held by several shareholders (several people sharing the government and revenues of the state).

In 1922 the 5 shareholders of Dhari were:

- Vakhatsing Nathoobhai (b. 1906)
- Raisingji Sivsingji (b. 1866)
- Udesing Gumasing (b. 1894)
- Somabhai Sahebsing (b. 1899)
- Salemsing Rupabhai (b. 1885)

In 1927 the 6 shareholders of Dhari were:

- Vakhatsing Nathoobhai (b. 1906)
- Udesing Gumasing (b. 1894)
- Somabhai Sahebsing (b. 1899)
- Salamsing Rupsing
- Laxmansing Raising
- Miljibhai Jorbhai
