= Varnoli Nani State =

Princely state

- Princely State of British India
- 1948
- Location of Varnoli Nani
- Area
  - 1931: 2.59 km^{2} (1.00 sq mi)
- Population
  - 1931: 87
| Succeeded by |
| India |

Varnoli Nani was a minor princely state during the British Raj in what is today Gujarat State India. It was initially administered by the Rewa Kantha Agency and then by the Baroda and Gujarat States Agency. It was part of the 26 Princely States making up the Pandu Mehwas, petty states placed under British protection between 1812 and 1825. The state had a population of 87 and an area of 1 sq mile.

== History ==
The petty princely state, belonging to the Pandu Mehwas division of Rewa Kantha, was ruled by Rajput Chieftains.

In 1901 it comprised only the single village, covering 1 square mile, with a population of 74, yielding 346 Rupees state revenue (1903–4, mostly from land), paying 19 Rupees tribute, to the Gaekwar Baroda State.

== Rulers ==
- Rahtor Bhaiji (b. 1824) fl. 1893 -fl. 1900
- Jivabhai Kanbhai fl. 1927 with:
- Bolabhai Motibhai fl. 1927

== See also ==
- Varnol Mal, neighboring princely state
- Varnoli Moti, neighboring princely state

== Sources and external links ==
- Imperial Gazetteer, on DSAL.UChicago.edu - Rewa Kantha
