= Akbar Ali =

Akbar Ali may refer to:

- Akbar Ali (poet) (1925–2016), Indian poet
- Akbar Ali (umpire) (born 1973), Indian-born Emirati cricket umpire
- Akbar Ali (cricketer) (born 2001), Bangladeshi cricketer
- Akbar Ali (politician) (born 2003), American politician
- Akbar Ali, main antagonist of the 1983 Indian film Andhaa Kaanoon, played by Danny Denzongpa

== See also ==
- Akbar Ali Khan (disambiguation)
