= Ambliara State =

Princely state of British India

Coordinates: 23°13′19″N 73°13′00″E

- Princely State of British India
- Unascertained–1943
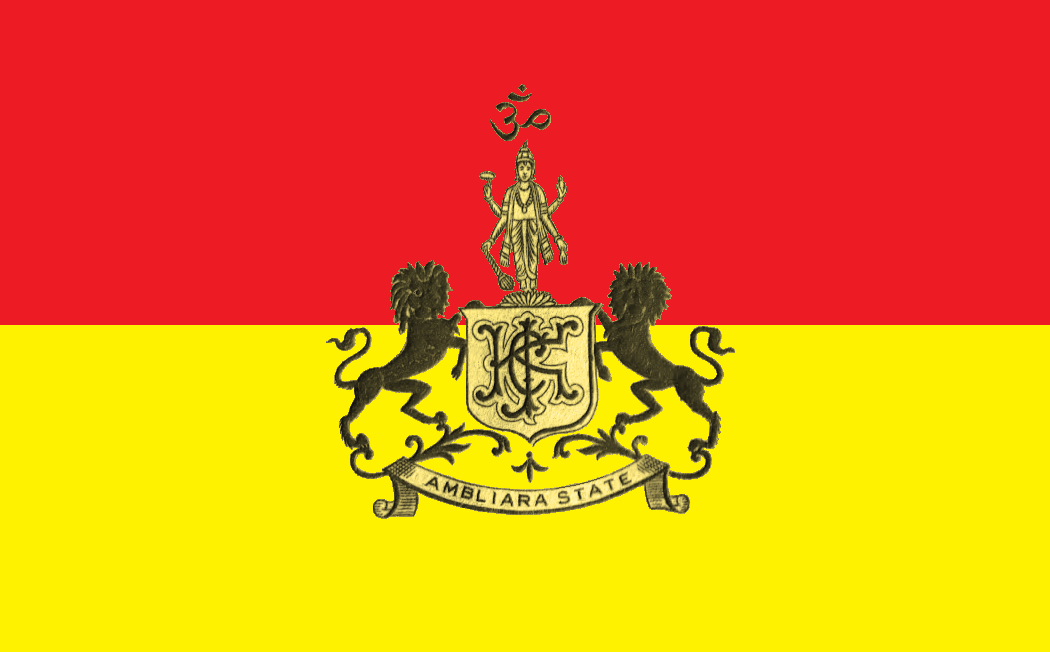
- Flag
- Capital: Ambaliyara
- Area
  - 1891: 207 km^{2} (80 sq mi)
- Population
  - 1891: 12,437
- History
  - Established: Unascertained
  - Attachment Scheme and merger with Baroda State: 1943
Succeeded by
Baroda State

The Ambliara State, also spelt Ambaliyara was a princely state under Mahi Kantha Agency of the Bombay Presidency during the era of the British Raj in India.

== History ==
The state was ruled by a Chauhan family, who were identified as "Kshatriya Koli" Thakordas, claiming descent from the Chauhans of Sambhar and Ajmer.

According to the Gujarat State Gazetteers, the rulers were by caste, Chauhans of Sambhar and Ajmer. A single, undated one paisa banknote was issued by the state. Ambliara State was merged with Baroda State under the Attachment Scheme on 10 July 1943.

== Rulers ==
The Ruler held the title of Thakur.

- Thakur Keshrisinhji Jalamsinhji (b. November 5, 1887) 1908 -fl. 1940

== See also ==
- Political integration of India
