= Poicha State =

Princely state

- Princely State of British India
- 1948
- Location of Poicha
- Area
  - 1931: 9.7125 km^{2} (3.7500 sq mi)
- Population
  - 1931: 1,018
Succeeded by
India

Poicha State was a minor princely state during the British Raj in what is today Gujarat State India. It was initially administered by the Rewa Kantha Agency and then by the Baroda and Gujarat States Agency. It was part of the 26 Princely States making up the Pandu Mehwas, petty states placed under British protection between 1812 and 1825. The state had a population of 1018 and an area of 3.75 sq miles.

== Rulers ==
The state was held by several shareholders.

Between 1922 and 1927 the 6 shareholders of Poicha were:

- Khumansing Himatsing (b. 1872) fl. 1922-fl. 1927
- Chandrasing Ranchod (b. 1888) fl. 1922-fl. 1927
- Himatsing Gagabhai (b. 1870) fl. 1922-fl. 1927
- Jenabhai Parbatsing (b. 1868) fl. 1922-fl. 1927
- Himatsing Waghji (b. 1887) fl. 1922-fl. 1927
- Thackerani Rupaliba, widow of Kanbhai Lakhbhai (b. 1894) fl. 1922
- Devabhai Lalbhai fl. 1927
