= Kadana State =

Village in Gujarat state, India

- Princely State of British India
- 1948
- Location of Kadana
- Area
  - 1931: 50.965 km^{2} (19.678 sq mi)
- Population
  - 1931: 17 560
Succeeded by
India

Kadana State was a minor princely state during the British Raj in what is today Gujarat State India. It was initially administered by the Rewa Kantha Agency and then by the Baroda and Gujarat States Agency. The state had a population of 17 560 and an area of 132 sq miles... Its capital was Kadana in the Mahisagar district.

== History ==
The state was founded in the 13th century by the younger brother of the founder of Sant State.

It was never conquered or forced to pay tribute to another state, but Sant claimed suzerainty over it until 1871.

== Rulers ==
The Ruler held the title of Thakur.

- Rana Parwatsinghji -April 12, 1889
- Rana Shri Chhatrasalji (b. January 28, 1879) April 12, 1889-fl. 1940 Adopted son and successor of the above.
