= Nalia State =

Princely state during the British Raj

- Princely State of British India
- 1948
- Location of Nalia
- Area
  - 1931: 2.59 km^{2} (1.00 sq mi)
- Population
  - 1931: 176
Succeeded by
India

Nalia State was a minor princely state during the British Raj in what is today Gujarat State India. It was initially administered by the Rewa Kantha Agency and then by the Baroda and Gujarat States Agency. It was part of the 28 Princely States making up the Sankheda Mehwas, estates dating from the fall of Pawagadh in 1484, by Rajputts settling on the south of the territory near the town of Sankheda, from which the Sankheda Mehwas derive their name. The state had a population of 176 and an area of 1 sq mile.

== History ==
The state of Baroda had imposed a tribute on the Sankheda Mewas, it's extraction causing British intervention in 1822, brokering an agreement where the Gaekwar received tribute from the states, while their independence was recognised by Baroda, which also promised to respect the petty states' rights.

== Rulers ==
The Rulers held the title of Thakur. It was held by a variety of shareholders.

In 1922 the 6 shareholdes of Nalia were:

- Thakur Jitkhan Alamkhan (b. 1882)
- Thakur Fatekhan Alamkhan (b. 1885)
- Thakur Umedkhan Alamkhan (no longer registered as a shareholder by 1927)
- Thakur Nasirkhan Khusalbawa
- Thakur Kuberkhan Jitabawa (b. 1855)
- Thakur Rasulkhan Hetamkhan
