= Bihora State =

Village in Gujarat state, India

- Princely State of British India
- 1948
- Location of Bihora
- Area
  - 1931: 4.532 km^{2} (1.750 sq mi)
- Population
  - 1931: 266
Succeeded by
India

Bihora State was a minor princely state during the British Raj in what is today Gujarat State India. It was initially administered by the Rewa Kantha Agency and then by the Baroda and Gujarat States Agency. It was part of the 28 Princely States making up the Sankheda Mehwas, estates dating from the fall of Pawagadh in 1484, by Rajputts settling on the south of the territory near the town of Sankheda, from which the Sankheda Mehwas derive their name. The state had a population of 266 and an area of 1.75 square miles.

== History ==
The state of Baroda had imposed a tribute on the Sankheda Mewas, it's extraction causing British intervention in 1822, brokering an agreement where the Gaekwar received tribute from the states, while their independence was recognised by Baroda, which also promised to respect the petty states' rights.

== Rulers ==
The Ruler held the title of Thakur.

- Thakur Jitabawa -May 15, 1891
- Thakur Hetamkhan Sardarkhan (b. 1882) May 15, 1891-fl. 1940 Son and successor of the above.
