= Vakhtapur State (Rewa Kantha) =

Princely state

- Princely State of British India
- 1948
- Location of Vakhtapur
- Area
  - 1931: 3.885 km^{2} (1.500 sq mi)
- Population
  - 1931: 390
Succeeded by
India

Vakhtapur State was a minor princely state during the British Raj in what is today Gujarat State India. It was initially administered by the Rewa Kantha Agency and then by the Baroda and Gujarat States Agency It was part of the 26 Princely States making up the Pandu Mehwas, petty states placed under British protection between 1812 and 1825.

The state had a population of 390 and an area of 1.5 sq miles.

== History ==
The minor princely state, belonging to the Pandu Mehwas division of Rewa Kantha, was ruled by Rajput Chieftains.

In 1901 it comprised only the single village, covering 1 1/2 square miles, with a population of 244, yielding 816 Rupees state revenue (1903–4, mostly from land), paying 116 Rupees tribute, to the Gaekwar Baroda State.

== Rulers ==
The Rulers had the title of Thakur. It wa divided between severel shareholders.

- Chhatrasing Navalsing (b. 1890) fl. 1922 -fl. 1927 with:
- Amarsing Nathoobhai (b. 1881) fl. 1922 -fl. 1927 and with:
- Bai Takhtaba (b. 1901) fl. 1922 and then:
- Laxmansing Becharsing fl. 1927

== External links and Sources ==
- Imperial Gazetteer, on DSAL.UChicago.edu - Rewa Kantha
