= Amrapur =

Amrapur may refer to the following places in India :

- Amrapur, Jamnagar, Gujarat, a village on Saurashtra peninsula, Gujarat
- Amrapur State, a former princely state in Halar prant, Kathiawad, with seat in the above Gujarati town
- A village in Sutrapada taluka in Gir Somnath District, in Sorath prant, Kathiawar, Gujarat
- Amrapur Mehwa, a village former princely (e)state in Pandu, Rewa Katha, Gujarat
- A village in Mudkhed taluka in Nanded District, Maharashtra
- A village in Shevgaon tehsil of Ahmednagar district, Maharashtra
