= Mandva =

Princely state

Coordinates: 21.914685°N 73.301475°E

Mandwa State
- Princely State of British India
- 1948
- Location of Mandwa
- Area
  - 1931: 42.735 km^{2} (16.500 sq mi)
- Population
  - 1931: 15 595
Succeeded by
India

Mandwa State was a minor princely state during the British Raj in what is today Gujarat State India. It was initially administered by the Rewa Kantha Agency and then by the Baroda and Gujarat States Agency. The state had a population of 15 595 and an area of 16.5 sq miles. It was part of the 28 Princely States making up the Sankheda Mehwas, estates dating from the fall of Pawagadh in 1484, by Rajputts settling on the south of the territory near the town of Sankheda, from which the Sankheda Mehwas derive their name. The state contained sixteen villages.

== History ==
The state of Baroda had imposed a tribute on the Sankheda Mewas, it's extraction causing British intervention in 1822, brokering an agreement where the Gaekwar received tribute from the states, while their independence was recognised by Baroda, which also promised to respect the petty states' rights.

The state entered into relations with the British Government in 1825.

It ceased to exist on 10 June 1948 by accession to newly independent India's Bombay State. The privy purse was fixed at 18,720 Rupees.

== Rulers ==
The Rulers held the title of Thakur.

- Rana Khumansinghi -September 13, 1890
- Raja Jitsinghji Khumansinghji (b. August 31, 1876) Sept 13th 1890-fl. 1911 Son and successor of the above.
- Raja Shri Khushalsinhji Sajansinhji (b. September 12, 1912) January 8, 1915-fl. 1940

== Modern village ==
The village lies between the Narmada River and GJ SH 160 in Bharuch district, Gujarat.

=== Places of interest ===
There is a well in the villages which is similar to stepwell and had rooms in its walls to rest there in summer.

=== Connectivity ===
Ankleshwar Airport is a greenfield airport being constructed near Mandva village by the Gujarat Industrial Development Corporation.

The Gujarat State Aviation Infrastructure Company Limited (GUJSAIL) has acquired 80 hectares of land for the construction of the airport. GUJSAIL intends to develop an Aviation Maintenance, repair, and operations (MRO) facility at the new airport.

== See also ==
- Mandwa, village in Raigad district, Maharashtra, central India
