= Rengan State =

Princely state

- Princely State of British India
- 1948
- Location of Rengan
- Area
  - 1931: 10.36 km^{2} (4.00 sq mi)
- Population
  - 1931: 587
Succeeded by
India

Rengan State (or Rangan, Regan) was a minor princely state during the British Raj in what is today Gujarat State India. It was initially administered by the Rewa Kantha Agency and then by the Baroda and Gujarat States Agency. It was part of the 28 Princely States making up the Sankheda Mehwas, estates dating from the fall of Pawagadh in 1484, by Rajputts settling on the south of the territory near the town of Sankheda, from which the Sankheda Mehwas derive their name. The state had a population of 587 and an area of 4 sq miles.

== History ==
The state of Baroda had imposed a tribute on the Sankheda Mewas, it's extraction causing British intervention in 1822, brokering an agreement where the Gaekwar received tribute from the states, while their independence was recognised by Baroda, which also promised to respect the petty states' rights.

== Rulers ==
The Rulers held the title of Thakur.

It was held by a variety of shareholders. Between at least 1922 and 1927 the 7 shareholders of Rengan were:

- Thakur Khusalbawa Rasulkhan
- Thakur Sajansing Motabawa (b. 1879)
- Thakur Bhaibava Jorabawa (b. 1888)
- Bai Umedba (widow of Thakur Jesing Alibhai) (b. 1880)
- Thakur Badharkhan Nathkan (b. 1847)
- Chunma (widow of Bapubhai Fatebhai) (b. 1858)
- Thakur Badrudin Umedbhai (b. 1849)
