= Ali Akbar =

Ali Akbar or Ali Ekber may refer to:

== Places ==
- Ali Akbar, East Azerbaijan, Iran
- Ali Akbar, Kermanshah, Iran

== People ==
- Ali al-Akbar ibn Husayn (664–680), son of the third Shia Imam, Husayn ibn Ali, and Umm Layla
- Ali Ekber Çiçek (1935–2006), Turkish musician
- Ali-Akbar Davar (1885–1937), Iranian prosecutor
- Ali-Akbar Mousavi Khoeini (born 1969), Iranian human rights activist
- 'Ali Akbar Khata'i (fl. ca. 1500–1516), Persian traveler and writer
- Ali Akbar Moradi (born 1957), Iranian-Kurdish musician and composer
- Ali Akbar Mohtashamipur (1947–2021), Iranian Shia cleric
- Ali Akbar Nategh-Nouri (born 1944), Iranian politician
- Ali Akbar Sadeghi (born 1937), Iranian artist
- Ali-Akbar Shahnazi (1897–1985), Iranian musician
- Ali Akbar Velayati (born 1945), Iranian politician
- Ali Akbar (writer) (born 1978), or Alakbar Aliagha oglu Aliyev, Azerbaijani writer and journalist
- Ali Akbar (academic) (born 1952), Bangladeshi academic
- Ali Akbar (Bangladeshi politician) (active 1973–1976)
- Ali Akbar (director) (born 1963), Indian film lyricist, screenwriter and director known as Ramasimhan Aboobakker
- Ali Abdul-Razaq Akbar (born 1984 or 1985), American right-wing activist now known as Ali Alexander
- Ali Akbar (newspaper hawker) (born 1952 or 1953), Pakistani newspaper hawker based in Paris
