= Jesar State =

Village in Gujarat state, India

- Princely State of British India
- 1948
- Location of Jesar
- Area
  - 1931: 3.885 km^{2} (1.500 sq mi)
- Population
  - 1931: 514
Succeeded by
India

Jesar State was a minor princely state during the British Raj in what is today Gujarat State India. It was initially administered by the Rewa Kantha Agency and then by the Baroda and Gujarat States Agency. It was part of the 26 Princely States making up the Pandu Mehwas, petty states placed under British protection between 1812 and 1825. The state had a population of 514 and an area of 1.5 sq miles.

== Rulers ==
The state was held by several shareholders (several people sharing the government and revenues of the state).

Between at least 1922 and 1927 the four shareholders of Jesar were:

- Gagabhai Khatubhai (b. 1871)
- Bhathibhai Gokalbhai (b. 1885)
- Bai Suraj (b.1879) widow of Dipsing Jitbhai
- Damabhai Dayabhai (b. 1890)
