= Akbar Ali Khan =

Akbar Ali Khan may refer to:

- Akbar Ali Khan (politician) (1899–1994), Indian politician, governor of Uttar Pradesh and member of the Rajya Sabha
- Akbar Ali Khan (economist) (1944–2022), Bangladeshi economist

== See also ==
- A. A. Khan (disambiguation)
- Ali Akbar Khan (disambiguation)
- Akbar Khan (disambiguation)
- Akbar Ali (disambiguation)
