= Kasla Paginu Muvadu State =

Princely state

- Princely State of British India
- 1948
- Location of Kasla Paginu Muvadu
- Area
  - 1931: 2.59 km^{2} (1.00 sq mi)
- Population
  - 1931: 133
Succeeded by
India

Kasla Paginu Muvadu State (or Kasla Paginu Muwada) was a minor princely state during the British Raj in what is today Gujarat State India. It was initially administered by the Rewa Kantha Agency and then by the Baroda and Gujarat States Agency. It was part of the 26 Princely States making up the Pandu Mehwas, petty states placed under British protection between 1812 and 1825. The state had a population of 133 and an area of 1 sq mile.

== Rulers ==
The state was held by several shareholders.

Between at least 1922 and 1927 the 4 shareholders of Kasla Paginu Muvadu were:

- Nathabhai Haribhai (b. 1866)
- Melsing Chanrasing (b. 1893)
- Jivabhai Jerbhai (b. 1883)
- Parbhatsing Khatubhai (b. 1890)
