= Vora State =

Princely state

- Princely State of British India
- 1948
- Location of Vora
- Area
  - 1931: 2.59 km^{2} (1.00 sq mi)
- Population
  - 1931: 107
Succeeded by
India

Vora State was a minor princely state during the British Raj in what is today Gujarat State India. It was initially administered by the Rewa Kantha Agency and then by the Baroda and Gujarat States Agency, and then by the Baroda and Gujarat States Agency. It was part of the 28 Princely States making up the Sankheda Mehwas, estates dating from the fall of Pawagadh in 1484, by Rajputts settling on the south of the territory near the town of Sankheda, from which the Sankheda Mehwas derive their name. The state had a population of 1407 and an area of 5 sq miles.

== History ==
The state of Baroda had imposed a tribute on the Sankheda Mewas, it's extraction causing British intervention in 1822, brokering an agreement where the Gaekwar received tribute from the states, while their independence was recognised by Baroda, which also promised to respect the petty states' rights.

== Rulers ==
The Ruler had the title of Thakur.

- Thakur Motabawa Fatebawa (b. 1855) 2 July 1890-fl. 1909
- Thakur Badharkhan Motabawa (b. 30 October 1901) 27 December 1911-fl. 1939
