= Dodka State =

Village in Gujarat state, India

- Princely State of British India
- 1948
- Location of Dodka
- Area
  - 1931: 7.77 km^{2} (3.00 sq mi)
- Population
  - 1931: 1,446
Succeeded by
India

Dodka State was a minor princely state during the British Raj in what is today Gujarat State India. It was initially administered by the Rewa Kantha Agency and then by the Baroda and Gujarat States Agency. It was part of the 26 Princely States making up the Pandu Mehwas, petty states placed under British protection between 1812 and 1825. The state had a population of 1446 and an area of 3 sq miles.

== Rulers ==
The Rulers had the title of Matadar (typically heads of families who co-govern the village/estate together, though sometimes they are elected)

In 1927 the two shareholders of Dodka were:

- Punja Karsan
- Ishwar Jibhai
