= Vasan Virpur State =

Princely state

- Princely State of British India
- 1948
- Location of Vasan Virpur
- Area
  - 1931: 32.375 km^{2} (12.500 sq mi)
- Population
  - 1931: 1,604
Succeeded by
India

Vasan Virpur State was a minor princely state during the British Raj in what is today Gujarat State India. It was initially administered by the Rewa Kantha Agency and then by the Baroda and Gujarat States Agency. It was part of the 28 Princely States making up the Sankheda Mehwas, estates dating from the fall of Pawagadh in 1484, by Rajputts settling on the south of the territory near the town of Sankheda, from which the Sankheda Mehwas derive their name. The state had a population of 4 571 and an area of 12.5 sq miles.

== History ==
The state of Baroda had imposed a tribute on the Sankheda Mewas, it's extraction causing British intervention in 1822, brokering an agreement where the Gaekwar received tribute from the states, while their independence was recognised by Baroda, which also promised to respect the petty states' rights.

== Rulers ==
The Rulers had the title of Thakur. The estate has been jointly held by a multitude of shareholders. From two in 1893 to three in 1909 to six in 1934 to seven in 1939

- Thakur Daima Jitabawa Bajibhai (b. 1870) 23 August 1887-fl. 1893 with:
- Thakur Jaswantsinghji (b. 1874) (in the Vasan Division) 23 August 1887 -fl. 1927 and he later with:
- Gambhirsinghji Bhaibawa (in the Virpur Division) fl. 1922 -fl. 1927 with:
- Chhatrasingji Bhaibawa (in the Savli division) fl. 1922-fl. 1927
