= Nangam State =

Indian princely state

- Princely State of British India
- 1948
- Location of Nangam
- Area
  - 1931: 7.77 km^{2} (3.00 sq mi)
- Population
  - 1931: 625
Succeeded by
India

Nangam State was a minor princely state during the British Raj in what is today Gujarat State India. It was initially administered by the Rewa Kantha Agency and then by the Baroda and Gujarat States Agency. It was part of the 28 Princely States making up the Sankheda Mehwas, estates dating from the fall of Pawagadh in 1484, by Rajputts settling on the south of the territory near the town of Sankheda, from which the Sankheda Mehwas derive their name. The state had a population of 625 and an area of 3 sq miles.

== History ==
The state of Baroda had imposed a tribute on the Sankheda Mewas, it's extraction causing British intervention in 1822, brokering an agreement where the Gaekwar received tribute from the states, while their independence was recognised by Baroda, which also promised to respect the petty states' rights.

== Rulers ==
The Rulers held the title of Thakur. It was held by a variety of shareholders (several people sharing the government and revenues of the state).

In 1922 the 4 shareholders of Nangam were:

- Thakur Chhitabawa Kaslabawa (b. 1903)
- Thakur Sardarkhan Badarbava (b. 1855)
- Thakur Manoverkhan Dilaverkhan (b. 1905)
- Thakur Narkhan Jitbha (b. 1862)

In 1927 the 4 shareholders of Nangam were:

- Thakur Chhitabawa Kaslabawa (b. 1903)
- Thakur Manoverkhan Dilaverkhan (b. 1905)
- Thakur Kesarkhan Sardarkhan
- Narbha Jitbha
