= Varnoli Moti State =

Princely state in Gujarat, India

- Princely State of British India
- 1948
- Location of Varnoli Moti
- Area
  - 1931: 5.18 km^{2} (2.00 sq mi)
- Population
  - 1931: 342
Succeeded by
India

Varnoli Moti was a minor princely state during the British Raj in what is today Gujarat State India. It was initially administered by the Rewa Kantha Agency and then by the Baroda and Gujarat States Agency. It was part of the 26 Princely States making up the Pandu Mehwas, petty states placed under British protection between 1812 and 1825. The state had a population of 342 and an area of 2 sq miles.

== History ==
The minor princely state, belonging to the Pandu Mehwas division of Rewa Kantha, was ruled by Rajput Chieftains.

In 1901 it comprised only the single village, yielding 409 Rupees state revenue (1903–4, mostly from land), paying 78 Rupees tribute, to the Gaekwar Baroda State.

== Rulers ==
The Rulers held the title of Thakur.

- Ratansing Bhagwanji (b. 1888) 6 May 1899-fl. 1934
- Ranjit Sinh Ratansinh (b. 16 October 1930) 22 June 1934-fl. 1939

== Sources and external links ==
- Imperial Gazetteer, on DSAL.UChicago.edu - Rewa Kantha

== See also ==
- Varnol Mal, neighboring princely state
- Varnoli Nani, neighboring princely state
