= Umetha State =

Princely state

- Princely State of British India
- 1948
- Location of Umetha
- Area
  - 1931: 62.16 km^{2} (24.00 sq mi)
- Population
  - 1931: 5 356
Succeeded by
India

Umetha State (or Umeta) was a minor princely state during the British Raj in what is today Gujarat State India. It was administered by the Rewa Kantha Agency and then by the Baroda and Gujarat States Agency. and had a population of 5 356 and an area of 24 sq miles. It was part of the 26 Princely States making up the Pandu Mehwas, petty states placed under British protection between 1812 and 1825.

The state consisted of five villages in the Kaira District and nine villages in the Rewa Kantha Agency region. It was part of the 26 Princely States making up the Pandu Mehwas, petty states placed under British protection between 1812 and 1825.

== Rulers ==
The Rulers had the title of Thakur.

- Thakur Hathisinghi (b. 1825) fl. 1893
- Thakur Gaupatsinghji Rajsinghi Padhiar (b. 9 November 1891) 21 July 1897- fl. 1915
- Thakur Himatsinhji Ramsinhji (b. 9 January 1917) 29 August 1929-20 June 1938
- Jagdevsinhji Ramsinhji (b. 7 August 1925) 20 October 1938-fl. 1940 (Brother of Himatsinhji Ramsinhji)
