= Itwad State =

Village in Gujarat state, India

- Princely State of British India
- 1948
- Location of Itwad
- Area
  - 1931: 15.54 km^{2} (6.00 sq mi)
- Population
  - 1931: 1,569
Succeeded by
India

Itwad State was a minor princely state during the British Raj in what is today Gujarat State India. It was initially administered by the Rewa Kantha Agency and then by the Baroda and Gujarat States Agency. It was part of the 26 Princely States making up the Pandu Mehwas, petty states placed under British protection between 1812 and 1825. The state had a population of 1569 and an area of 6 sq miles.

== Rulers ==
The state was held by several shareholders (several people sharing the government and revenues of the state).

In 1922 the four shareholders of Itwad were:

- Partapsing Jhinabhai (b. 1893)
- Motising Amarsing (b. 1871)
- Vajesing Gulabsing (b. 1879)
- Jeebhai Sivbhai (b. 1863)

In 1927 the four shareholders of Itwad were:

- Partapsing Jhinabhai (b. 1893)
- Vajesing Gulabsing (b. 1879)
- Motibhai Amarsing
- Jinabhai Shivsing
