= Gotardi State =

Village in Gujarat state, India

- Princely State of British India
- 1948
- Location of Gotardi
- Area
  - 1931: 7.77 km^{2} (3.00 sq mi)
- Population
  - 1931: 430
Succeeded by
India

Gotardi State was a minor princely state during the British Raj in what is today Gujarat State India. It was initially administered by the Rewa Kantha Agency and then by the Baroda and Gujarat States Agency. It was part of the 26 Princely States making up the Pandu Mehwas, petty states placed under British protection between 1812 and 1825. The state had a population of 430 and an area of 7.77 square kilometres (3.00 mi^{2}).

== Rulers ==
The state was held by several shareholders (several people sharing the government and revenues of the state).

The Shareholders in 1888 were:

- Ramsingh Satu -March 4, 1888
- Sawa Ramsingh fl. 1888 (son and successor of the above)

In 1922 the four shareholders of Gotardi were:

- Hathibhai Jethibhai (b. 1885)
- Dayabhai Sivabhai (b. 1884)
- Bhimsing Bhakeibhai (b. 1919)
- Ghinabhai Jhujabhai (b. 1892)

In 1927 the four shareholders of Gotardi were:

- Hathibhai Jethibhai (b. 1885)
- Bhimsing Bhakeibhai (b. 1919)
- Dapabhai Shivbhai
- Jinabhai Punjabhai
