= Nahara State =

Indian princely state

- Princely State of British India
- 1948
- Location of Nahara
- Area
  - 1931: 7.77 km^{2} (3.00 sq mi)
- Population
  - 1931: 458
Succeeded by
India

Nahara State was a minor princely state during the British Raj in what is today Gujarat State India. It was initially administered by the Rewa Kantha Agency and then by the Baroda and Gujarat States Agency. It was part of the 26 Princely States making up the Pandu Mehwas, petty states placed under British protection between 1812 and 1825. The state had a population of 458 and an area of 3 sq miles.

== Rulers ==
The Rulers held the title of Thakur. The state was held by a variety of shareholders.

In 1927 the 2 shareholder of Nahara were:

- Kalubhai Jesingbhai
- Mohanbhai Pathibhai
