= Amrapur State (Kathiawar) =

Former princely state in Gujarat, India

- Princely State of British India
- 1948
- Area
  - 1931: 20.72 km^{2} (8.00 sq mi)
- Population
  - 1931: 1,771
Succeeded by
India

Amrapur State was a minor princely state during the British Raj in what is today Gujarat State India. It was administered by the Western Kathiawar Agency division of the Western India States Agency The state had a population of 1771 and an area of 8 sq miles. The state had an annual revenue of 10 000 rupees. Not to be confused with Amrapur State (Rewa Kantha) also located in Gujarat.

== History ==
Alisher received the Taluka as a grant from the Mughal Viceroy of Gujarat, Fakhr-ud-daulah in ca. 1745-1746.

The Talukdars held jurisdictional powers, but these were stripped from them in 1868 on suspicion of harbouring Vágher outlaws.

== Rulers ==
The Rulers had the title of Talukdar. The state was held by several shareholders (several people sharing the government and revenues of the state).

The Talukdar from the time of the founder Alisher were:

- Alisher fl. ca. 1745/1746
- Jiabhai
- Dosubhai

Shareholders (4th Generation):

- Fateh Khan with:
- Jiabhai and with:
- Salábat Khan

Shareholders (5th Generation):

- Amdubhai fl. 1884 with:
- Ajambhai fl. 1884 and with:
- Muhammad Khan fl. 1884
