= Pandu State =

Princely state

- Princely State of British India
- 1948
- Location of Pandu
- Area
  - 1931: 23.31 km^{2} (9.00 sq mi)
- Population
  - 1931: 2 341
| Succeeded by |
| India |

Pandu State was a minor princely state during the British Raj in what is today Gujarat State India. It was initially administered by the Rewa Kantha Agency and then by the Baroda and Gujarat States Agency. It was part of the 26 Princely States making up the Pandu Mehwas, petty states placed under British protection between 1812 and 1825. The state had a population of 2 341 and an area of 9 sq miles.

== Rulers ==
The state was held by several shareholders (several people sharing the government and revenues of the state).

In 1922 the 5 shareholders of Pandu were:

- Khanjada Akbarkhan Bahadarkhan (b. 1898)
- Khanjada Ranmastakhan Ahmedkha (b. 1878)
- Khanjada Sikdarkha Tajukhan (b. 1893)
- Sardarbibi, widow of Nathukhan Mansurkhan (b. 1862)
- Khanjada Ayubkhan Hamirkhan

In 1927 the 5 shareholders of Pandu were:

- Jabarkhan Nijamkhan (b. ca. 1894)
- Usafkhan Ranmatkhan (b. ca. 1913)
- Sardarbibi, widow of Nathukhan Mansurkhan (b. 1862)
- Sikdarkha Tajukhan¨
- Ayubkhan Hamirkhan
