= Bilkha =

Village in the Indian state of Gujarat

Bilkha is a small village in the Junagadh district in Gujarat, India. Bilkha lies at the foot of the Girnar clump in the south-east corner.

== History ==
According to a legend, Bilkha was the ancient residence of the legendary king Bali. It is situated about eighteen miles east of Vamansthali (the present Vanthali), the abode of Vamana.

During British period, it is owned by Kathis of the Vala tribe, a branch of the Jetpur house. In 1880s, Vala Kala Devdan was a its talukdar who had fourth class jurisdiction in his sole villages, and Valas Ala and Desa both sons of Bhima Sata, they each exercised sixth class jurisdiction in their sole villages. Bilkha itself was joint between the above-mentioned shareholders so it was managed by a thanadar subordinate to the Jetpur taluka court.

=== Anand Ashram ===
There is an ashram established by Nathuram Sharma, a saint.

== Demographics ==
The population according to the census of 1872 was 3,327 and 3,791 people according to the one taken in 1881. The population recorded on the census of 2011 was 11,134.

== Economy ==
Bilkha is known for medium variety traditional wood work.

== In popular culture ==
The legend of Sagalsha produced several folk-songs. It was a subject of 1978 Gujarati film Sheth Sagalsha.
