= Akbar Khan Mehwa =

Akbar Khan is a village which is part of Pantalavdi, Gujarat.

== History ==
Akbar Kahn was part of a petty state in the Pandu Mehwas division of Rewa Kantha, which comprised the town and two more villages. The state covered 2 1/2 square miles and was ruled by Muslim Chieftains. It had a combined population of 178 in 1901, yielding a state revenue of 2,544 Rupees (1903–4, nearly all from land), paying a tribute of 127 Rupees to the Rajpipla State.
