= Agar, Gujarat =

Coordinates: 22.031°N 73.661°E

Agar is a village and former Mehwal (petty princely state) in Gujarat, western India.

== History ==
The non-salute state Agar was part of the Sankheda Mehwas, under the colonial Rewa Kantha Agency). It was ruled by Muslim Chieftains, comprised the town and 27 more villages. It covered 17 square miles with a population of 1,399 in 1901, yielding a state revenue of 10,746 Rupees (1903–4; mostly from land) and paying 143 Rupees tribute to the Gaikwar Baroda State.
