= Rampura State =

Village and former princely state in Gujarat, India

Coordinates: 21.9017°N 73.5981°E

Rampura is a village and former petty princely state in Gujarat, western India.

As a state, Rampura was a part of the Western India States Agency. It was classified as a thana (i.e. a very small state) in Katosan, which were entities smaller than even a non-salute state and something of an administrative anomaly, although seen as an expedience in the years immediately following the 1857 Rebellion, the state was attached to Baroda State in June 1940. Such states, says historian John McLeod, "lacked the resources to maintain anything beyond the most rudimentary governments, indeed that they were so tiny that their independent existence was simply ludicrous." In 1945, it was recorded that the state had an area of 4.5 square miles (12 km^{2}), a population of 2304 and a revenue of 11,000 rupees. It had previously been a part of the Rewa Kantha Agency.
