= Jambughoda =

City in Gujarat, India

- city
- Location in Gujarat, India Jambughoda (India)
- Coordinates: 22.3667000°N 73.7167000°E
- Country: India
- State: Gujarat
- District: Panchmahal

Population (2011)
  - Total: 42,476

Languages
  - Official: Gujarati, Hindi
- Time zone: UTC+5:30 (IST)
- PIN: 389390
- Telephone code: 91-2676 XXXXXX
- Vehicle registration: Gj-17 and GJ-20

Jambughoda is a village and Tehsil in Panchmahal district in the Indian state of Gujarat. The village has a population of 2,731, while the overall tehsil has a population of 42,476.

The Tehsil is well known for the Jambughoda Wildlife Sanctuary.

== Geography ==
Jambughoda is located in the eastern part of Panchmahal, in a region covered by hills and forests. This area has shallow, sandy soil and receives slightly less rainfall than the western part of Panchmahal.

== Demographics ==
As of 2011 India census, Jambughoda had a population of 42,476. There are 7,900 households. People belonging to Scheduled Tribes are 15,112 (36%).

The literacy rate in the tehsil of Jambughoda in 2011 was 64%, which was lower than the average rate of 71% in all of Panchmahal district.

The tehsil of Jambughoda contained 55 villages in 2011 (including Jambughoda itself), all of which had access to electricity and clean drinking water, 49 of which had schools, 13 of which had medical facilities, 16 of which had post offices, 49 of which had transport communications (bus, rail, or navigable waterways), 3 of which had banks, 5 of which had agricultural credit societies, and 46 of which had pucca roads. 54.1% of the total land area in Jambughoda tehsil was under cultivation, and 25.8% of the land under cultivation was irrigated.

In 2011, the village of Jambughoda itself had a population of 2,731 people, in 633 households. It possessed 3 primary schools, 1 secondary school, 2 senior secondary schools, and 2 vocational training schools, as well as a community health centre, a public library, and a regular market. The town had access to tap water, public toilets, and landlines as well as cell phone coverage. Jambughoda had pucca roads, but not water-bound Macadam roads. These roads were not connected to national highways, but they were connected to state highways. Jambughoda did not have a railway station.

== History ==
Before 1947, Jambughoda was the seat of the princely state of Jambughoda (former narukot state), which was merged with the Dominion of India on 10 June 1948. The state had been ruled by the Hindu Parmar clan of Kolis.

=== Rulers of Jambughoda State ===
==== Thakor Sahibs ====
- .... - .... Dipsinhji Jagatsinhji (b. 1841 - d. ....)
- .... - 27 Sep 1917 Gambhirsimhji (d. 1917)
- 27 Sep 1917 – 15 Aug 1947 Ranjitsinhji Gambhirsinhji (b. 1892 - d. 1962)

== Agriculture ==
The predominant crops in the village of Jambughoda are castor, corn, cotton, rice, and pigeon pea. Due to an almost total lack of irrigation facilities in the village, agriculture is largely dependent on monsoon.

== See also ==
- Jambughoda Wildlife Sanctuary
