= Sukhi Dam =

- Location within India
- Interactive map of Sukhi Dam
- Country: India
- Location: Chhota Udepur district, Gujarat
- Coordinates: 22°26′20.7″N 073°52′56.5″E
- Purpose: Irrigation
- Status: Operational
- Construction began: 1978
- Opening date: 1987

Dam and spillways
- Type of dam: Embankment, earth-fill
- Impounds: Sukhi River
- Height (foundation): 38 m (125 ft)
- Length: 4,256 m (13,963 ft)
- Dam volume: 4,173,170 m^{3} (5,458,300 cu yd)
- Spillway type: Ogee, gate-controlled
- Spillway capacity: 5,964.3 m^{3}/s (210,630 cu ft/s)

Reservoir
- Total capacity: 178,470,000 m^{3} (144,690 acre⋅ft)
- Active capacity: 167,140,000 m^{3} (135,500 acre⋅ft)
- Catchment area: 412 km^{2} (159 mi^{2})
- Surface area: 29.04 km^{2} (11.21 mi^{2})

Sukhi Dam is an embankment dam on the Sukhi River near the village of Dungarvat in Chhota Udepur district of Gujarat, India. The primary purpose of the dam is the irrigation of a 31,532 ha (77,920 acres) area with nearly 350 km (220 mi) of canals. It was built between 1978 and 1987. The dam is an earth-fill type with a masonry spillway section.
