= Alwa Mehwa =

Alwa is a village and former Mehwal (petty princely state) in Gujarat, western India.

== History ==
The non-salute state, comprising Alwa town and four more villages, was part of the Sankheda Mehwas. It was ruled by Muslim Chieftains, under the colonial Rewa Kantha Agency. It covered 8 square miles with a population of 805 in 1901, yielding a state revenue of 5,577 Rupees (1903–4; mostly from land) and paying 52 Rupees tribute to the Gaikwar Baroda State.

== External links and sources ==
- Imperial Gazetteer on DSAL - Rewa Kantha
