= Aziz Ahmed Khan =

Pakistani diplomat

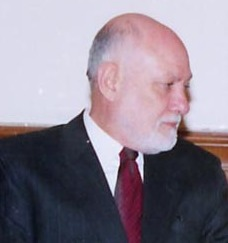
Aziz Ahmad Khan in 2003

Aziz Ahmed Khan was Pakistan's high commissioner to India from June 2003 to September 2006. His tenure as high commissioner to India was extended by Prime Minister of Pakistan, Shaukat Aziz by a year in August 2005.

== Career ==
Aziz Ahmed Khan had the unique distinction of being Pakistan's Ambassador to Afghanistan and High Commissioner to India concurrently. Both countries are Pakistan's neighbours having significant strategic importance for Pakistan. Before holding this position in India, he was Pakistan's ambassador to Kabul between December 1996 and June 2000, when Taliban held power in Afghanistan.

As a High Commissioner in India from 2003 – 2006, Aziz Ahmed Khan tried to transform and improve the difficult relationship between India and Pakistan during his tenure.

Aziz Ahmed Khan was born to a Pathan family on 16 September 1943.

He is a career diplomat who had joined the Foreign Service of Pakistan in 1969, and has served in several countries. He spent almost four decades as a member of Foreign Service of Pakistan before retiring.

== Post-retirement activities ==
After his retirement from the Foreign Office, Aziz Ahmed Khan has been involved in Track-II dialogues with diplomats from India and Afghanistan. In addition, he has worked as a consultant at the National Defence University in Islamabad, Pakistan.

Diplomatic posts
Preceded by Ashraf Qazi	Pakistan High Commissioner to India; June 2003–September 2006	Succeeded by Shahid Malik
