= Muhammad Akbar Khan (politician) =

Indian politician and landlord

Raja Muhammad Akbar Khan was a landlord and a politician from Jhelum during the British rule in India. He was the 28th King (Raja) of Chibhal, and by extension the Head of the Chib Rajput Dynasty. He was elected for the first time in 1920 in a thirty-eight member Punjab legislative council from Jhelum.
