= Palej =

Palej Palez
- city
- Location in Gujarat, India Palej (India)
- Coordinates: 21.92°N 73.08°E
- Country: India
- State: Gujarat
- District: Bharuch

Population (2001)
  - Total: 10,872

Languages
  - Official: Gujarati Hindi
- Time zone: UTC+5:30 (IST)
- Vehicle registration: GJ
- Website: gujaratindia.com

Palej is a census town in the Bharuch district, Gujarat, India. Cotton is a major product of the industrial area surrounding the town. Palej supports the daily needs of many small nearby villages.

== History ==
Palej acts as a central hub for many small and big villages of Bharuch and Vadodara district. Being connected by both, a highway and a railway station Palej has become the main source for the frequent as well as the rare commuters. It has witnessed a drastic development in the past decade in all sectors.

People of Hindu, Muslim and Jain religion are the prominent resident of Palej. The beauty of Palej has attracted many migrants who have settled here. Palej also has a lake and few religious shrines.

In the feudal and British Raj] past, Palej (also spelled Palaj) was among the numerous petty princely states of Gujarat in the Mahi Kantha Agency.
