= Amrapur, Jamnagar district =

Amrapur
- Village
- Location in Gujarat, India Amrapur (India)
- Coordinates: 22.371262°N 70.38633°E
- Country: India
- State: Gujarat
- District: Jamnagar

Population (2001)
  - Total: 250

Languages
  - Official: Gujarati, Hindi
- Time zone: UTC+5:30 (IST)
- Postal Index Number: 361130
- Vehicle registration: GJ
- Website: gujaratindia.com

See Amrapur for namesakes

Amrapur is a town and former petty princely state in Jamnagar, in Kathiawar, Gujarat state, western India.

== Village ==
Most inhabitants are farmers, some connected with animal husbandry. Mr Vijaybhai Borsadiya is currently sarpanch of the village‍.

=== Location ===
Amrapur is surrounded on three sides by a dam. Amrapur is located at 22.371262°N 70.38633°E On Globe. The road to it is from Kalavad to Ranuja, Dhutarpur, Sumary, Kharavedha, Amrapur.

=== Statistics ===
- Population (approx): 250
- Buildings (approx): 25
- Temples: 3
- Shops: 2
- Primary School: 1

== History ==
Amrapur was the seat of an eponymous non-salute princely state in Halar prant, comprising it and another village on Saurashtra peninsula in present Gujarat, western India. It was ruled by Muslim Chieftains of a Shaikh family.

It had a population of 1210 in 1901, yielding a state revenue of 8,000 Rupees (all from land, 1903–04) and paying 511 Rupees to the British.

== Photo gallery ==
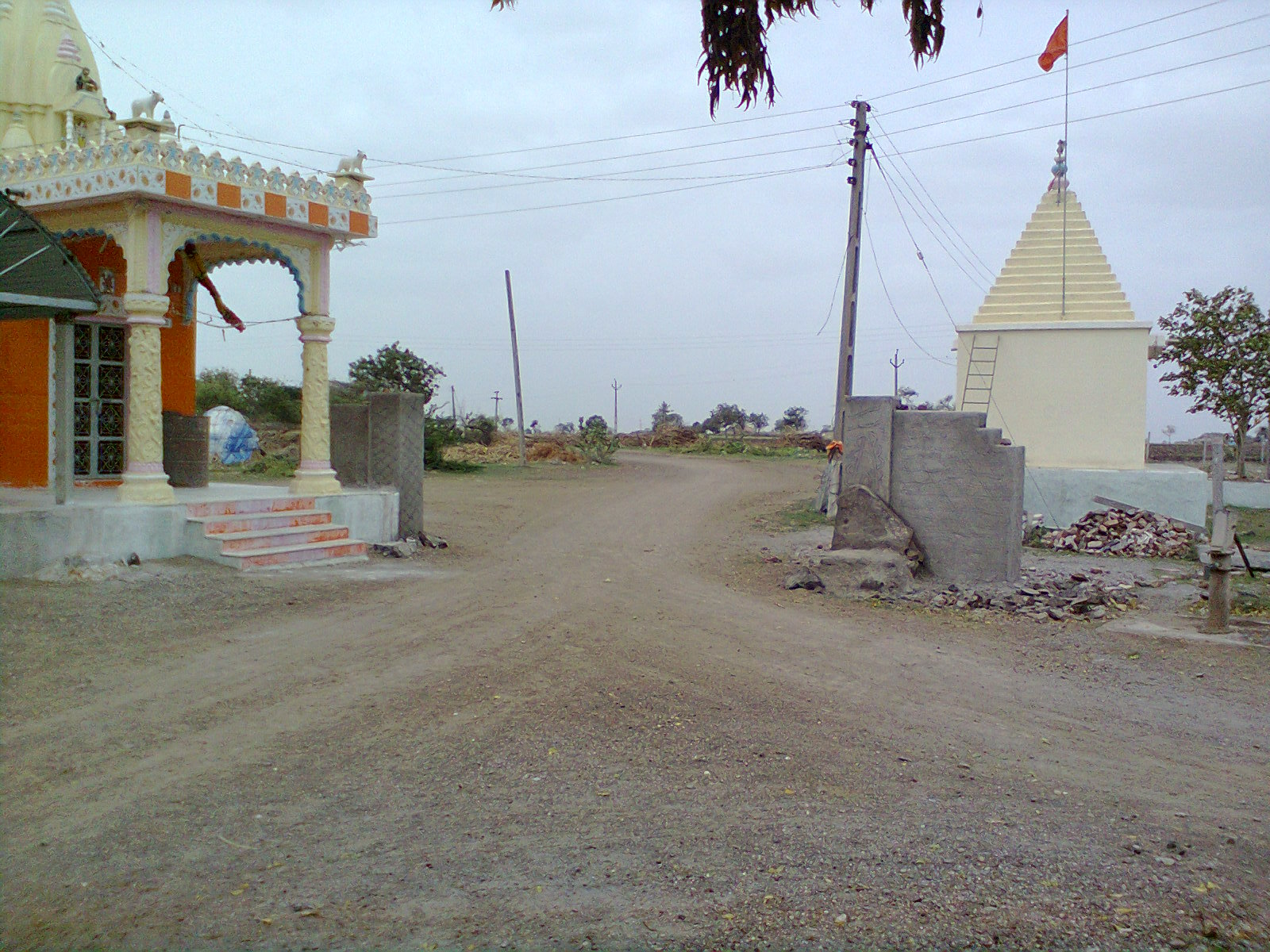
Main entrance of Amrapur village

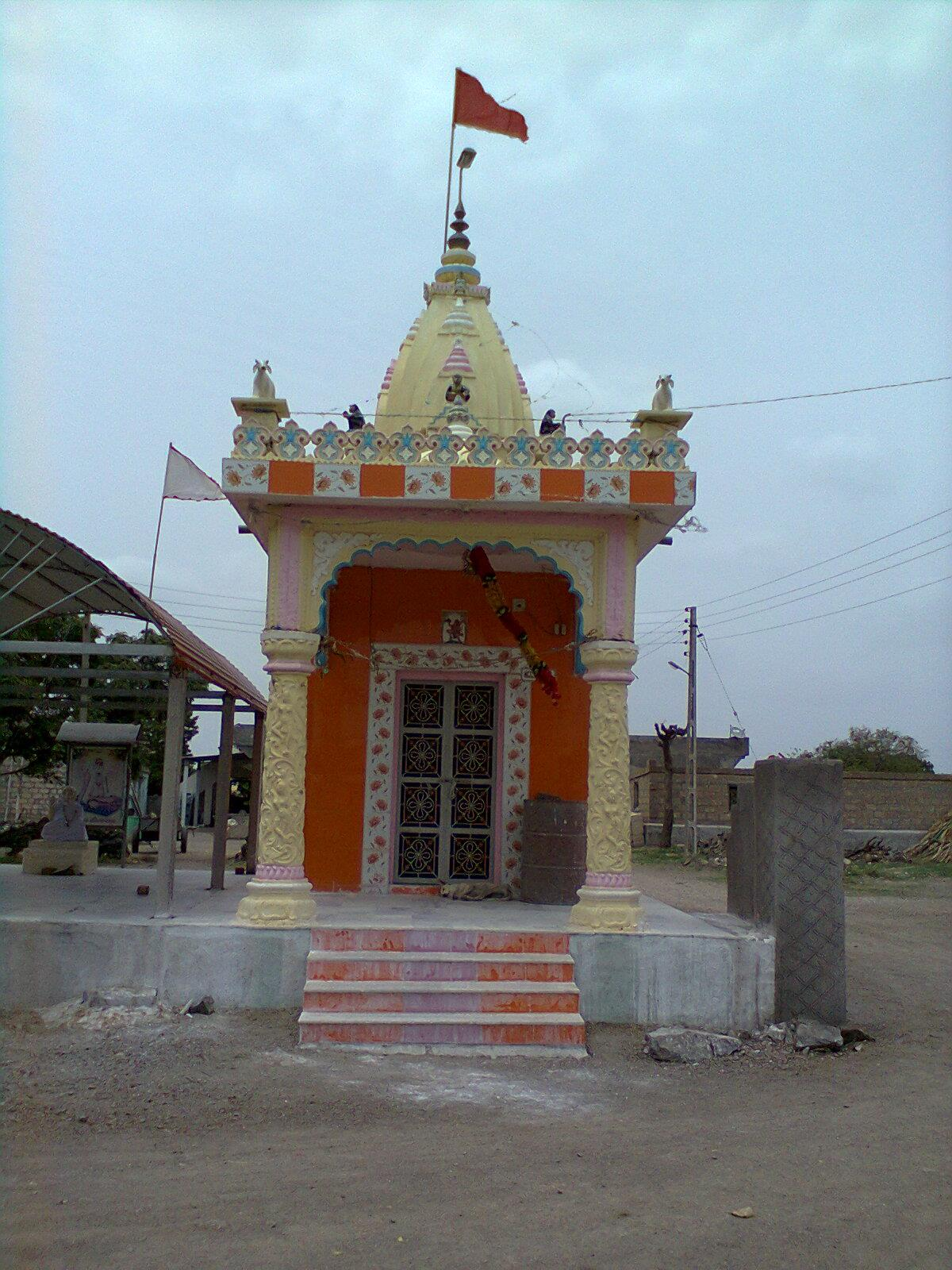
Hanuman temple Amrapur

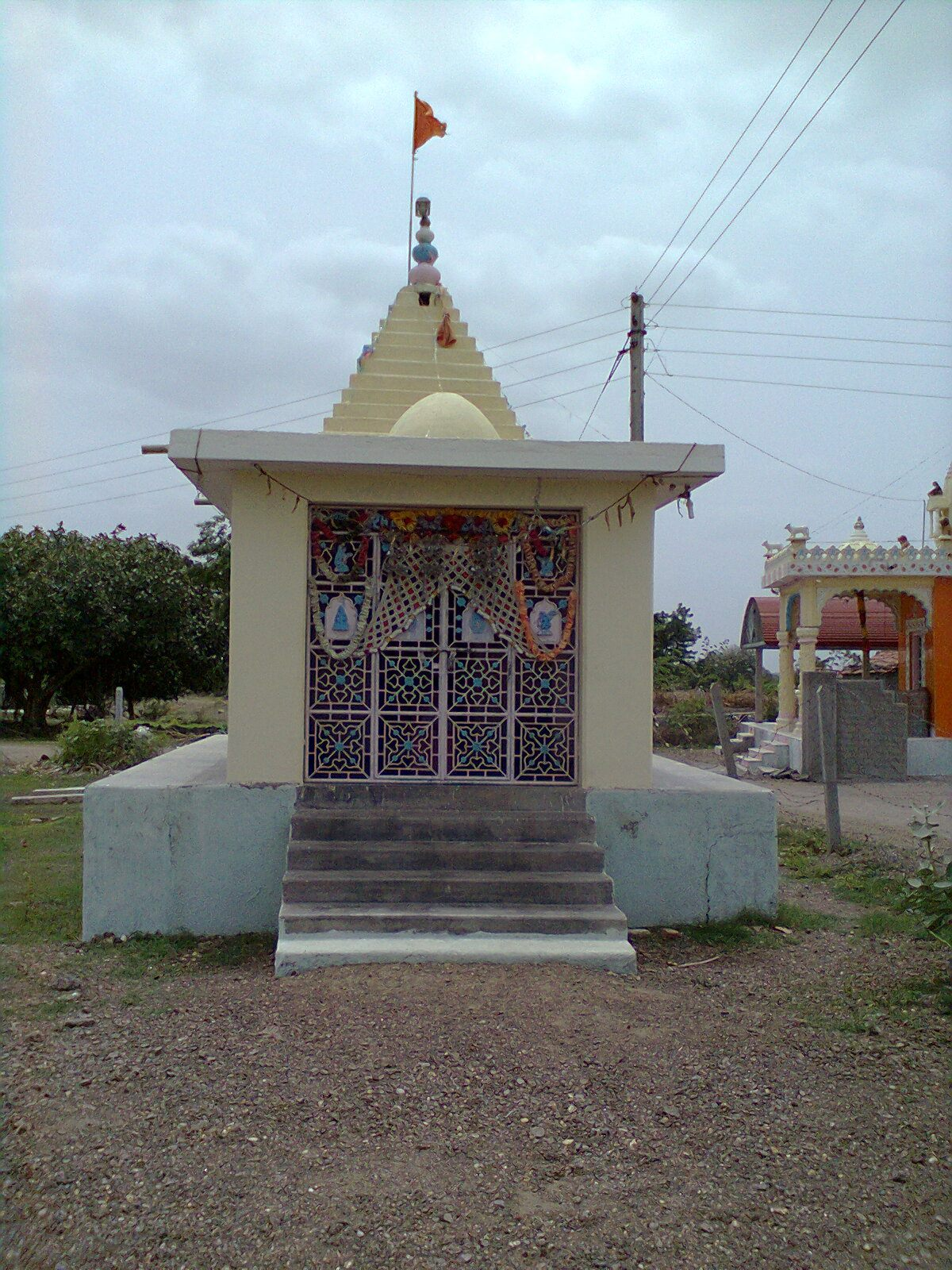
Shiva temple Amrapur

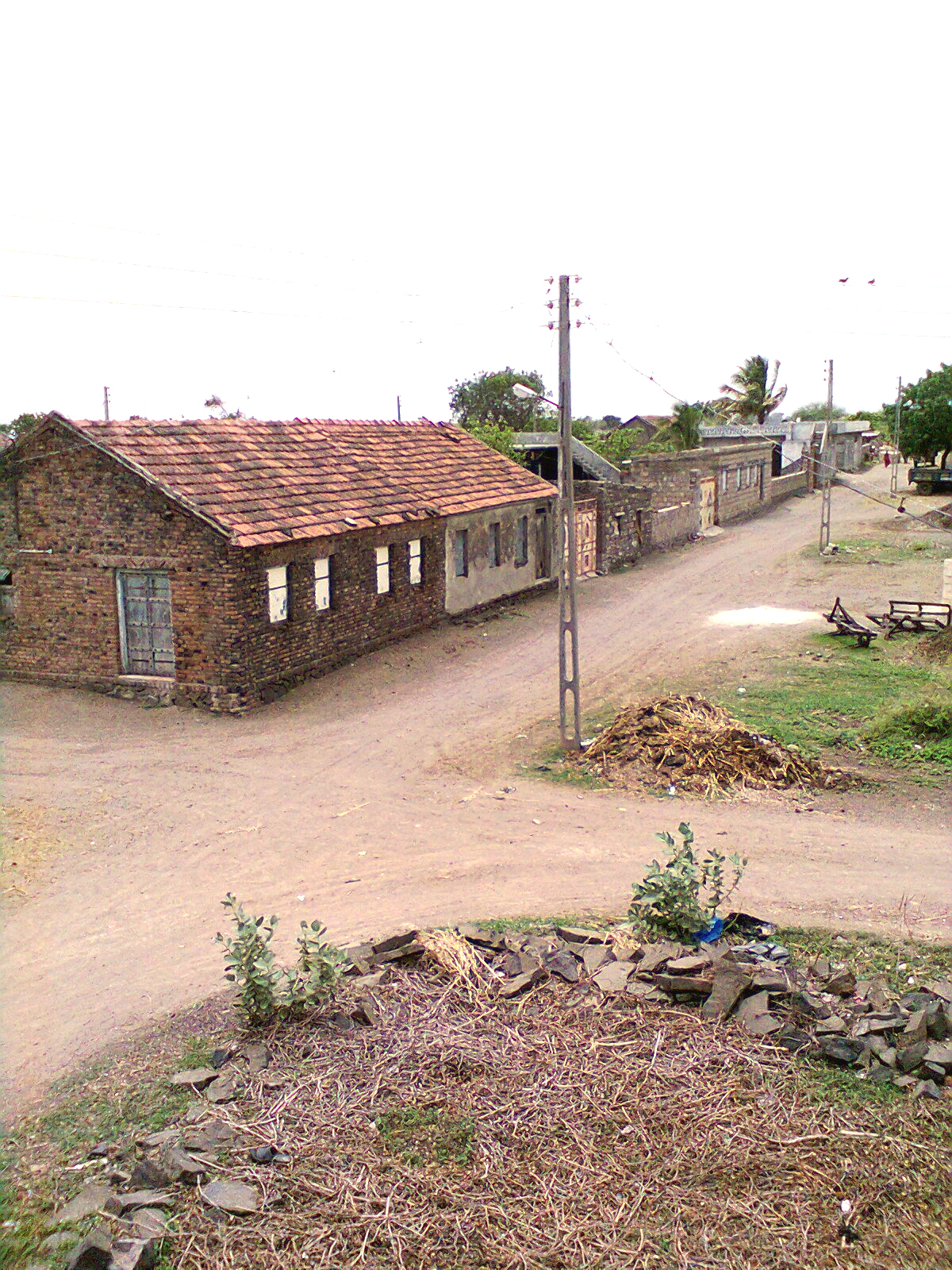
A view of village Amrapur

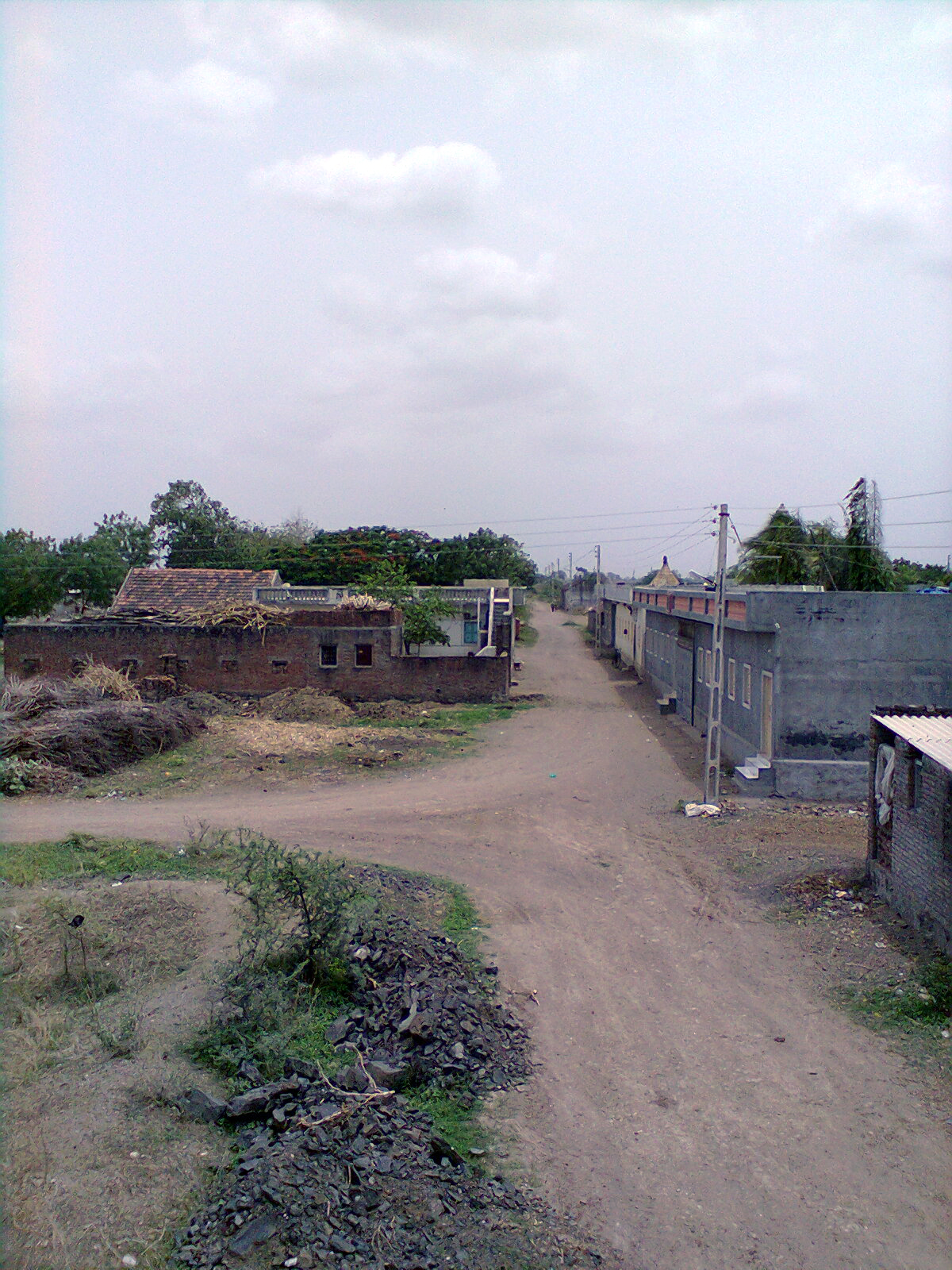
A view of village Amrapur

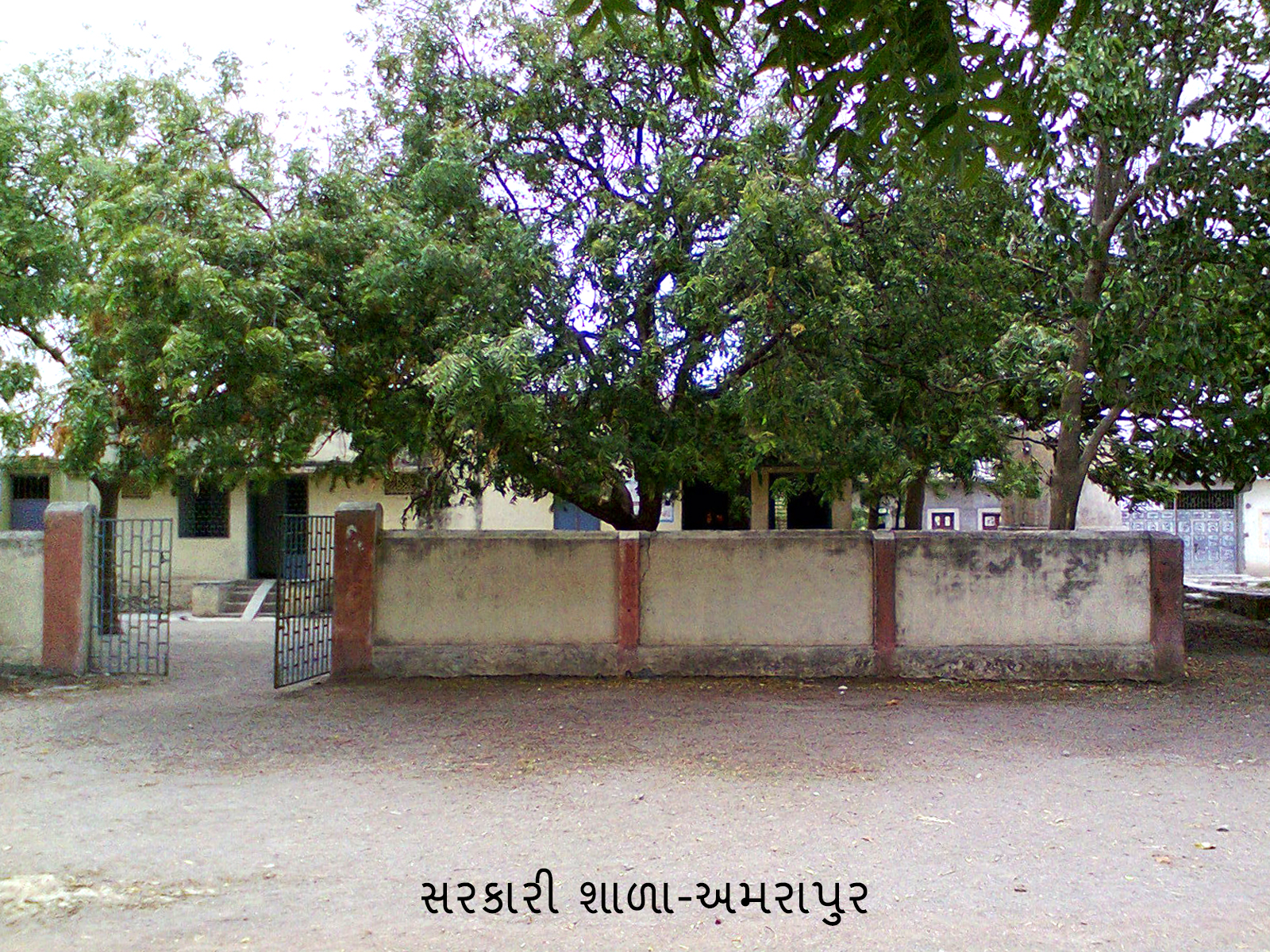
Primary school Amrapur

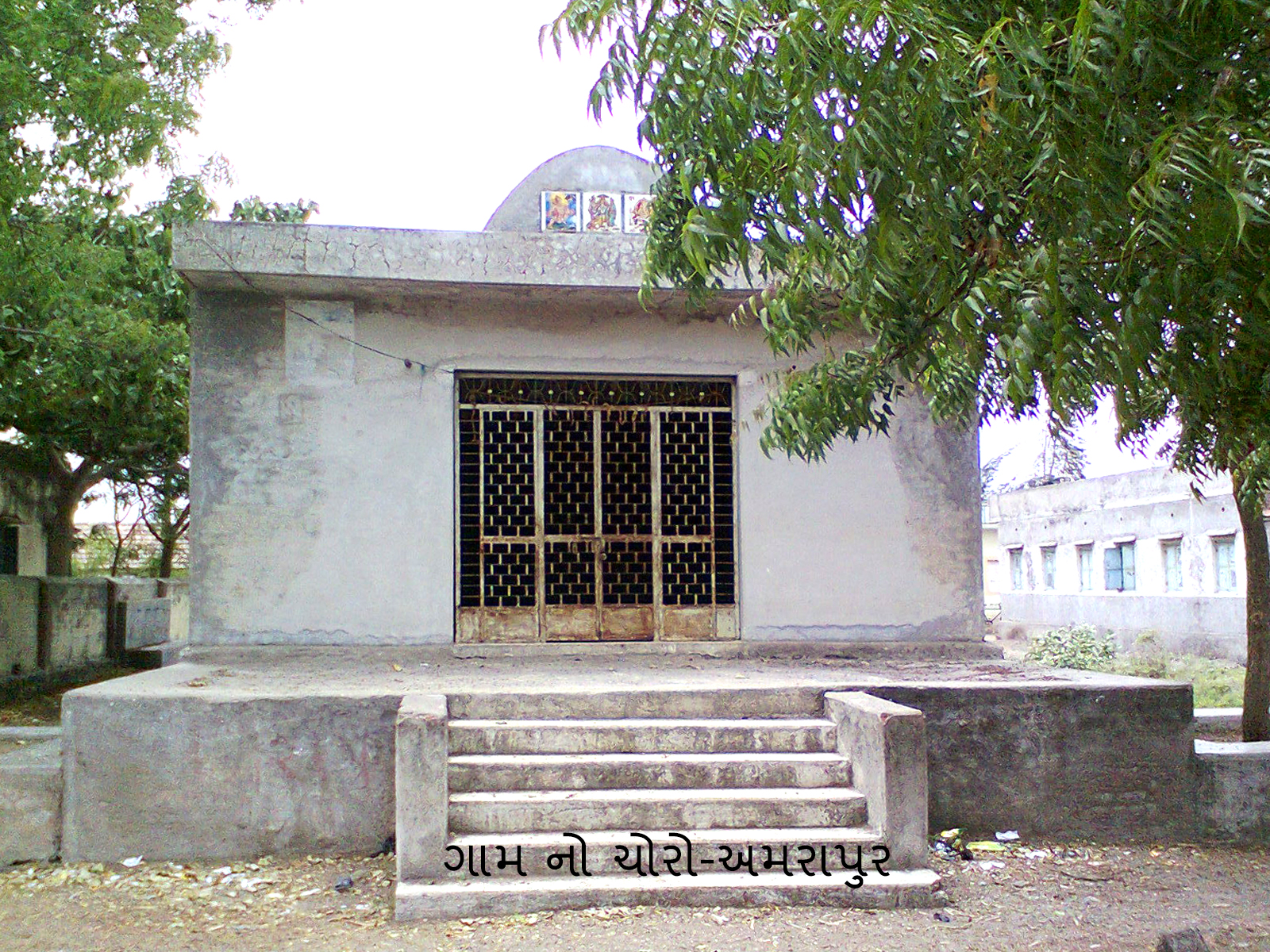
Gam no choro Amrapur

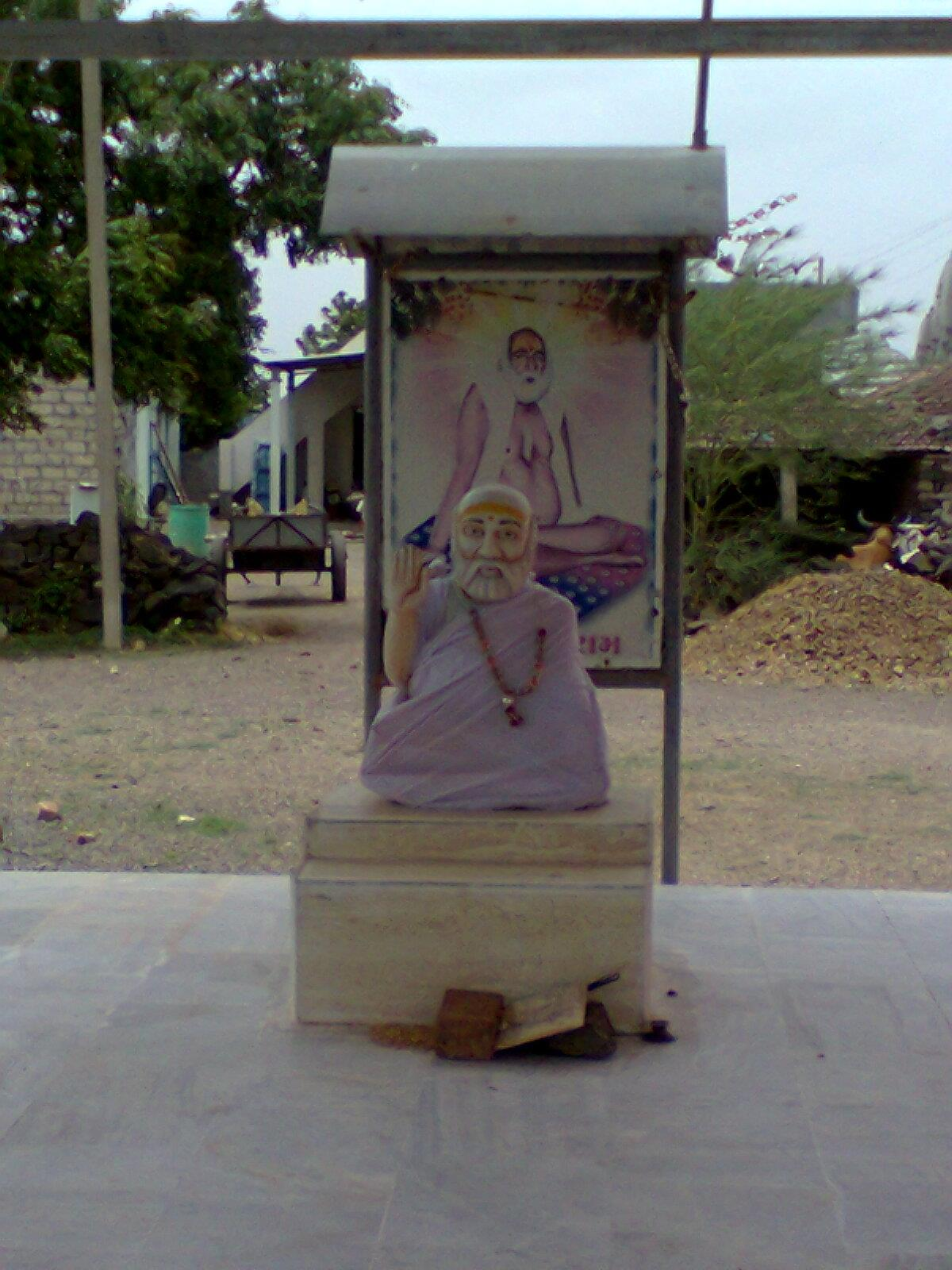
Bapa sitaram oto Amrapur

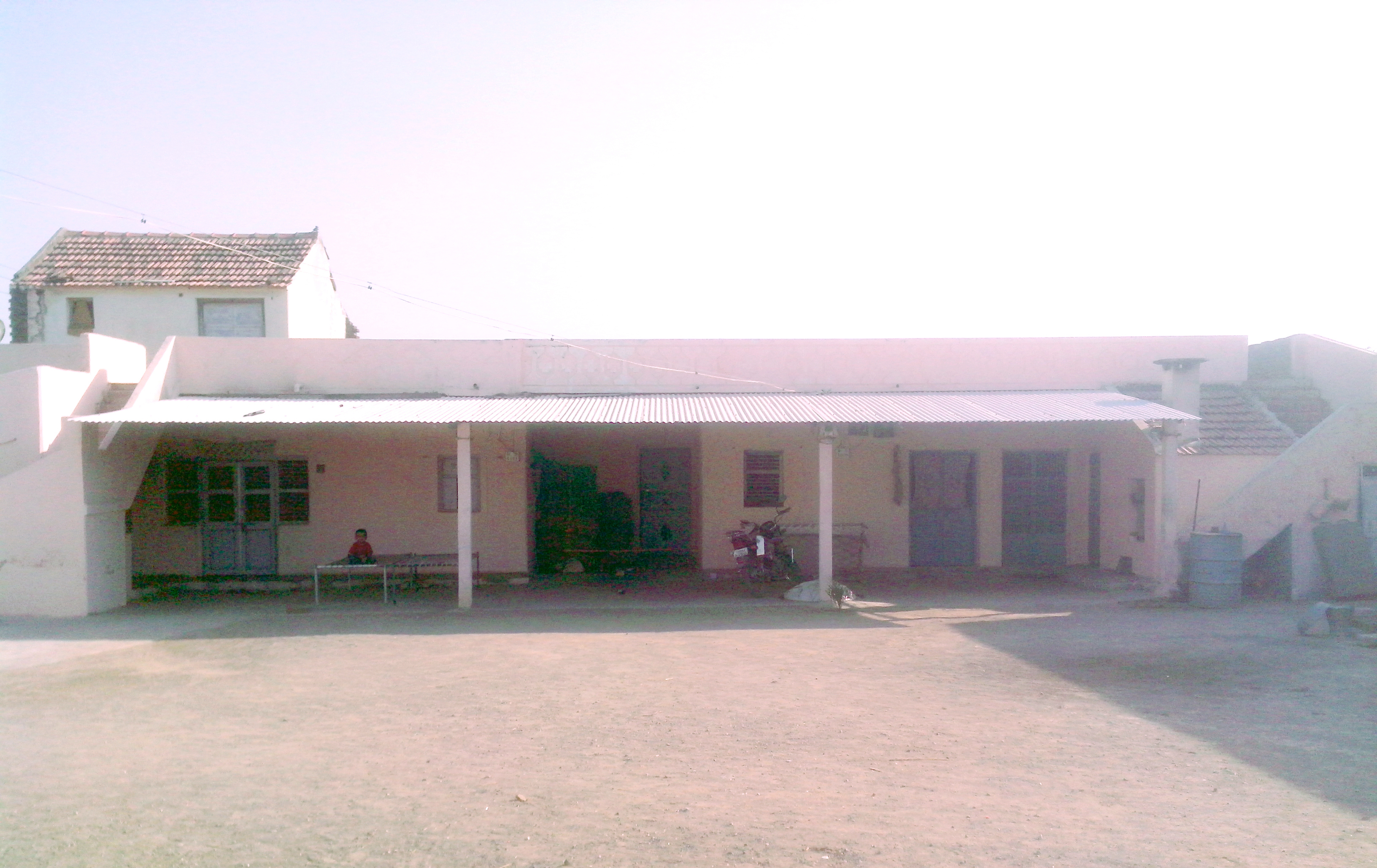
Borsadiya family's makan in Amrapur

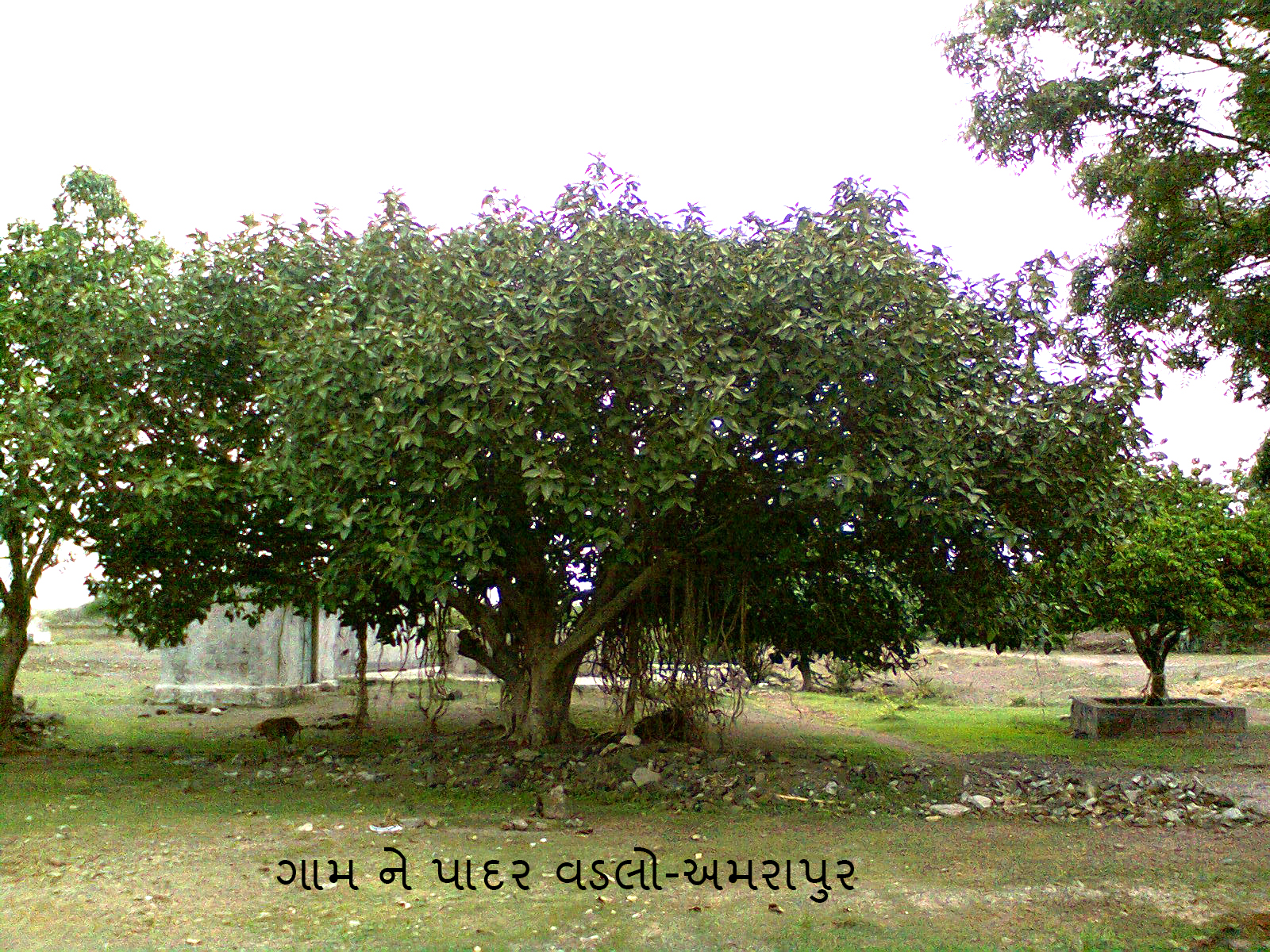
A banyan tree in village.

== External links and Sources ==
- The official Facebook page of village
- Imperial gazetteer, on dsal.uchicago.edu - Kathiawar
