= Vadia, Banaskantha =

Vadia Village of Prostitutes
- village
- Country: India
- State: Gujarat
- District: Banaskantha

Languages
  - Official: Gujarati, Hindi
- Time zone: UTC+5:30 (IST)
- Vehicle registration: GJ
- Website: gujaratindia.com

Vadia is a village in Banaskantha district in the Indian state of Gujarat. It is located 70 miles west of Palanpur city, and about 240 kilometres (150 miles) from Ahmedabad.

Historically, unmarried women of this village supported themselves through prostitution, with the men of the village working as pimps.

Efforts are underway to change this state of affairs, by such organizations as Vicharta Samuday Samarthan Manch.
