= Vadia (Narmada) =

- city
- Location in Gujarat, India Vadia (India)
- Coordinates: 21.8651°N 73.5198°E
- Country: India
- State: Gujarat
- District: Narmada

Population (2001)
  - Total: 4,479

Languages
  - Official: Gujarati, Hindi
- Time zone: UTC+5:30 (IST)
- <!-- PIN -->: 391120
- Vehicle registration: GJ
- Website: gujaratindia.com

Vadia is a census town in Narmada district in the Indian state of Gujarat.

== Demographics ==
As of 2001 India census, Vadia had a population of 4479. Males constitute 59% of the population and females 41%. Vadia has an average literacy rate of 84%, higher than the national average of 59.5%: male literacy is 90%, and female literacy is 76%. In Vadia, 6% of the population is under 6 years of age.
