= Ali Akbar, Kermanshah =

Ali Akbar علي اكبر
- Village
- Location within Iran
- Coordinates: 34°14′14″N 47°18′37″E
- Country: Iran
- Province: Kermanshah
- County: Kermanshah
- Bakhsh: Central
- Rural District: Dorudfaraman

Population (2006)
  - Total: 269
- Time zone: UTC+3:30 (IRST)
  - Summer (DST): UTC+4:30 (IRDT)

Ali Akbar (Persian: علي اكبر, also Romanized as ‘Alī Akbar; also known as Alīavar) is a village in Dorudfaraman Rural District, in the Central District of Kermanshah County, Kermanshah Province, Iran. At the 2006 census, its population was 269, in 61 families.
