= Chhota Udaipur State =

Princely state of India

Kingdom of Chhota Udaipur છોટાઉદેપુર રિયાસત
- 1743–1948
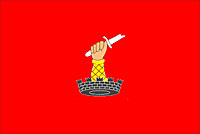
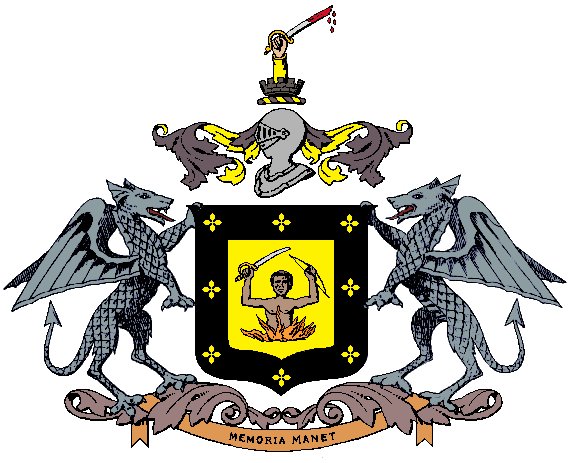
- Flag Coat of arms

- Kingdom of Chhota Udaipur (green)
- Capital: Chhota Udaipur
- Area
  - 1901: 2,305 km^{2} (890 sq mi)
- Population
  - 1901: 64,621
- History
  - Established: 1743
  - Accession in Dominion of India: 1948
| Succeeded by |
| Dominion of India |
- Today part of: Gujarat, Republic of India

The Chhota Udaipur State or 'Princely State of Chhota Udaipur', (Gujarati: છોટાઉદેપુર; Hindi: छोटा उदैपुर) was a princely state with its capital in Chhota Udaipur during the era of British India. The last ruler of Chhota Udaipur State signed the accession to join the Indian Union in 1948. Chhota Udaipur shares a history with Devgadh Baria and Rajpipla as one of the three princely states of eastern Gujarat.

== History ==
The erstwhile Princely State of Chhota Udaipur was founded in 1743 by Rawal Udeysinhji, a descendant of Patai Rawal of Champaner.

This state was an salute state with an 11 gun salute under the Rewa Kantha Agency and merged with the Union of India on 16 August 1947.

== Rulers ==
- 1762–1771 Arsisinhji
- 1771–1777 Hamirsinhji II
- 1777–1822 Bhimsinhji
- 1822–1851 Gumansinhji
- 1851–1881 Jitsinhji
- 1881–1895 Motisinhji
- 1895 – 29 Aug 1923 Fatehsinhji
- 29 Aug 1923 – 15 Oct 1946 Natwarsinhji Fatehsinhji
- 15 Oct 1946 – 15 Aug 1947 Virendrasinhji

== See also ==
- Rewa Kantha Agency
