= Angadh =

Coordinates: 22.3102°N 73.1839°E

Angadh was a Mehwal (petty princely state) under British India, spanning a part of what is now Vadodara district in Gujarat.

The caste of the ruling chief was recorded as Koli in an Imperial Gazetteer. The gazetteer documented a population of around 2,269 people in 1901.
