= Mansinhji I =

Maharana Raj Sahib of Jhalavad

- Maharana Raj
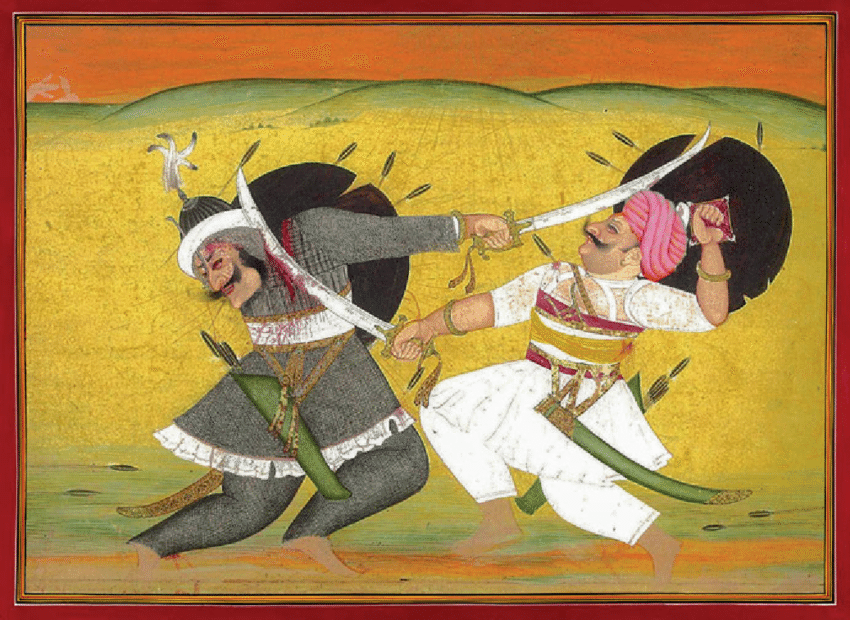
- Maharana Raj Mansinhji I slays Malik Shajiv of Dasada, 1523

Maharana Raj Sahib of Jhalavad
- Reign: 1523-1563
- Predecessor: Ranoji
- Successor: Raisinhji I of Halvad
- Died: 31 October 1563; Halvad, Kingdom of Jhalavad
- Spouse: Ganga de Jadeja of Dhrol; Amar Kunwarba Vaghelaof Kalol; Kesar kunwarba Jadeja of Kanthkot; Hirji Kunwarba Jadeja of Moda; Dev kunwarba Chavda of Abod
- Issue: Raisinhji I Ramsinhji; Govindsinhji
Names
- Mansinhji I Ranoji Jhala
- House: Halvad
- Dynasty: Jhala
- Father: Ranoji
- Mother: Hetkunwarba or Kalyande Vaghela of Sanand

Maharana Raj Mansinhji I, also called Rao Man Ghelo (Rao Man, the Mad) was the 27th Maharana Raj Sahib of Jhalavad from 1523 to 1563 until his death.

== Biography ==
Mansinhji was born to Ranoji (also known as Ranigdev), the Maharana of Jhalavad. His father, Ranoji, was killed by Malik Shajiv of Dasada, whose father, Malik Bakhan, had been executed on Ranoji's orders.

Mansinhji succeeded his father in 1523 and later avenged his death by killing Malik Shajiv and capturing Dasada. However, since Dasada was a jagir under the Gujarat Sultanate, Bahadur Shah the Sultan of Gujarat marched against Jhalavad.

Mansinhji was defeated by the Sultan's army and went into outlawry for many years. He was offered shelter by the Rao of Kutch, where he his base in Kutch near Bhuj. There are many daring tales of Mansinhji and his men of ravaging and escaping the sultans jagirs. Mansinhji was advised to surrender by his step mother, who was the daughter of Rao Lunkaran of Bikaner and had her sister married to Bahadur Shah. He later sneaked into the Diu fort, where the Sultan was staying, and confronted him. Sultan was touched by his noble bearing, as a result, the Sultan treated Mansinhji respectfully and restored him to the throne of Jhalavad. However the Jagirs of Mandal and Viramgam were not returned back.

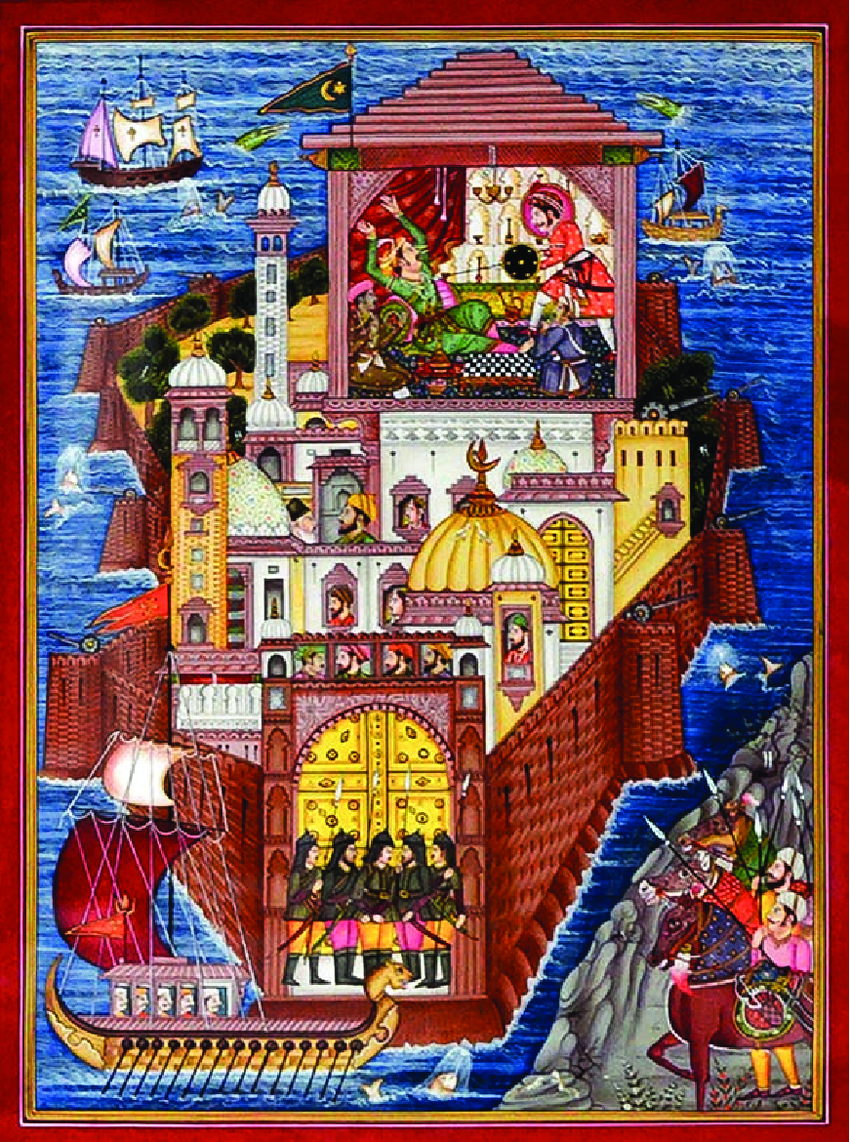
Maharana Raj Mansinhji I confronts Sultan Bahadur Shah at Diu fort, 1535

Mansinhji died on 31 October 1563 and was succeeded by his son, Raisinhji I.
