= Ranoji =

16th-century Maharana of Jhalavad

Ranigdev
- Maharana Raj
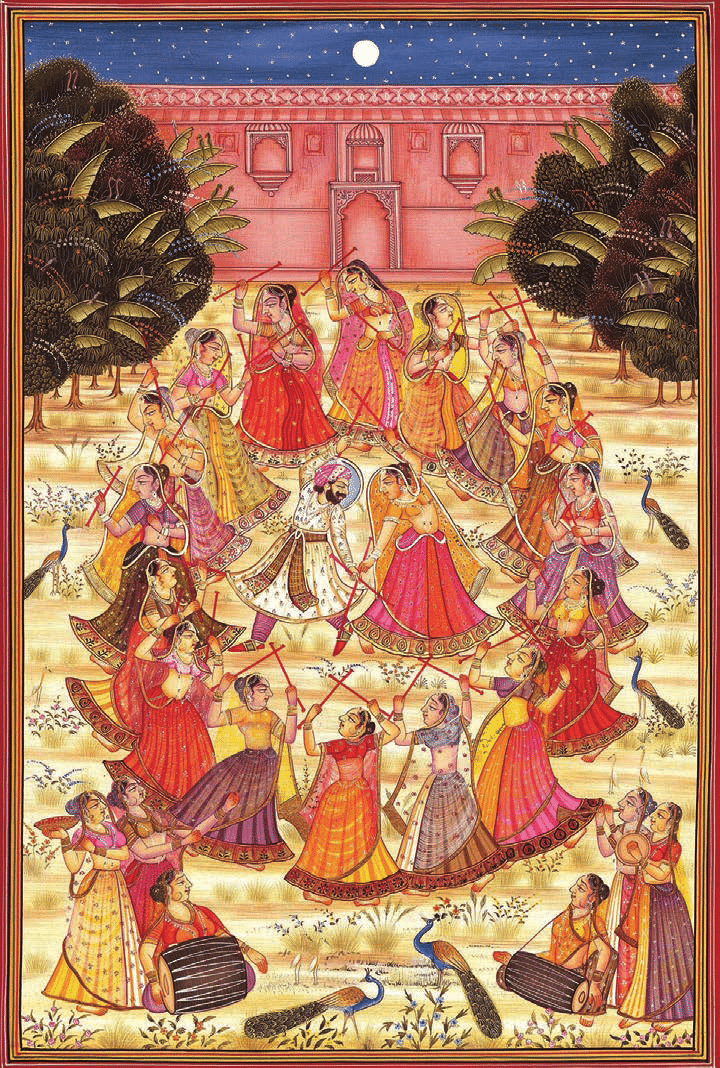
- Maharana Raj Ranoji dancing on Rasada Haq Pade Vinar Jagjo with the women of his family and court during the Navratri festival, 1515.

Maharana Raj Sahib of Jhalavad
- Reign: 1500-1523
- Predecessor: Ajoji
- Successor: Mansinhji I
- Born: 1491; Halvad, Kingdom of Jhalavad
- Died: 1523 (aged 31–32)
- Spouse: Hetkunvarba or Kalyande Vaghela, of Sanand; Naniba Chavda of Mansa; Jatan kunwar Rathore, Daughter of Rao Lunkaran of Bikaner; Ajab kunvarba Jadeja of Bhadarwa; Hirjiba Solanki of Gajana
- Issue: Mansinhji I Vasaji; Udaysinhji
Names
- Ranigdev I Raidharji Jhala
- House: Halvad
- Dynasty: Jhala
- Father: Raidharji
- Mother: Asade Parmar of Muli

Maharana Raj Ranigdev, also known as Ranoji, was the 26th Maharana of Jhalavad. He deposed his step-brother Ajoji in 1500 and ruled until his death in 1523.

== Biography ==
=== Early life ===
Ranoji was born in 1491 to Raidharji and his second wife, Asade Parmar of Muli. After Raidharji's death in 1500, Ajoji, Ranoji's elder step-brother, succeeded to the throne of Jhalavad.

=== Seizing the throne ===
Later, when Ajoji went to Haridwar to perform some rituals, Ranoji, with the support of his maternal grandfather Lakhdarji, the Thakore Sahab of Muli, closed the gates of Halvad and seized control. Ranoji was then declared the new Maharana, effectively deposing his step-brother. Although Rajmata Asade was the regent until Ranoji grew mature.

Upon his return to Halvad, Ajoji learned of his brother's betrayal and went to seek help from the Sultan of Ahmedabad. However, the Sultan, having received a large nazrana (gift) from Lakhdarji, refused to assist him. Other neighbouring Rajput kingdoms including Idar and Marwar refused to help Ajoji against a powerful Rajput state.

=== Death ===
Ranoji once ordered the execution of Malik Bakhan of Dasada. Malik Shajiv, the son of Malik Bakhan killed Ranoji to avenge his father's death in 1523. Ranoji was succeeded by his son Mansinhji I.
