= Kingdom of Jhalavad =

Former monarchy in India (1090–1948)

Coordinates: 22.98°N 71.47°E

Kingdom of Jhalavad Dharangadhra State Halvad-Dhrangadhra State
- 1090–1949
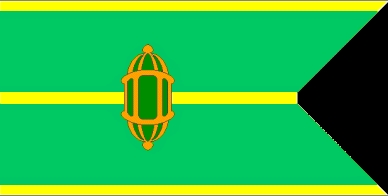
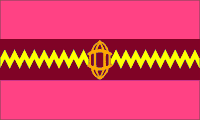
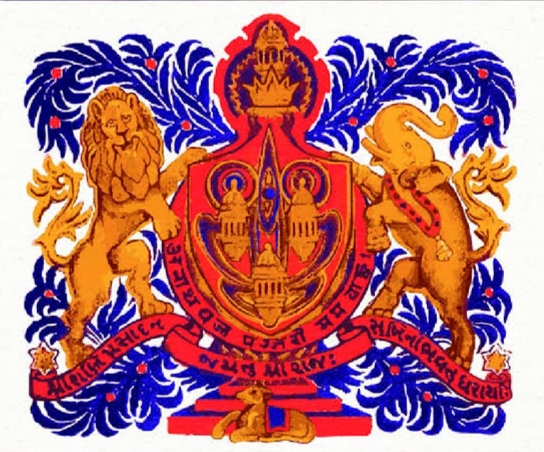
- Top: Flag of Dhrangadhra State (1911-1946); Bottom: Flag of Dhrangadhra State (1946-49) Coat of arms
- Motto: Anathavajrapanjaro Mama Bahuh; "My Arm Protects the Defenceless"
- Anthem: Sri-Sakti-Prasadana Jayatu Sri-Rajah Sukhino Bhavatu Dhararyah; "The Noble King be the Conqueror by the Favour of Sri Sakti, the Noble Dara be Happy"
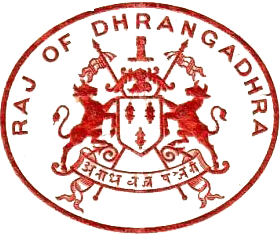
- Emblem

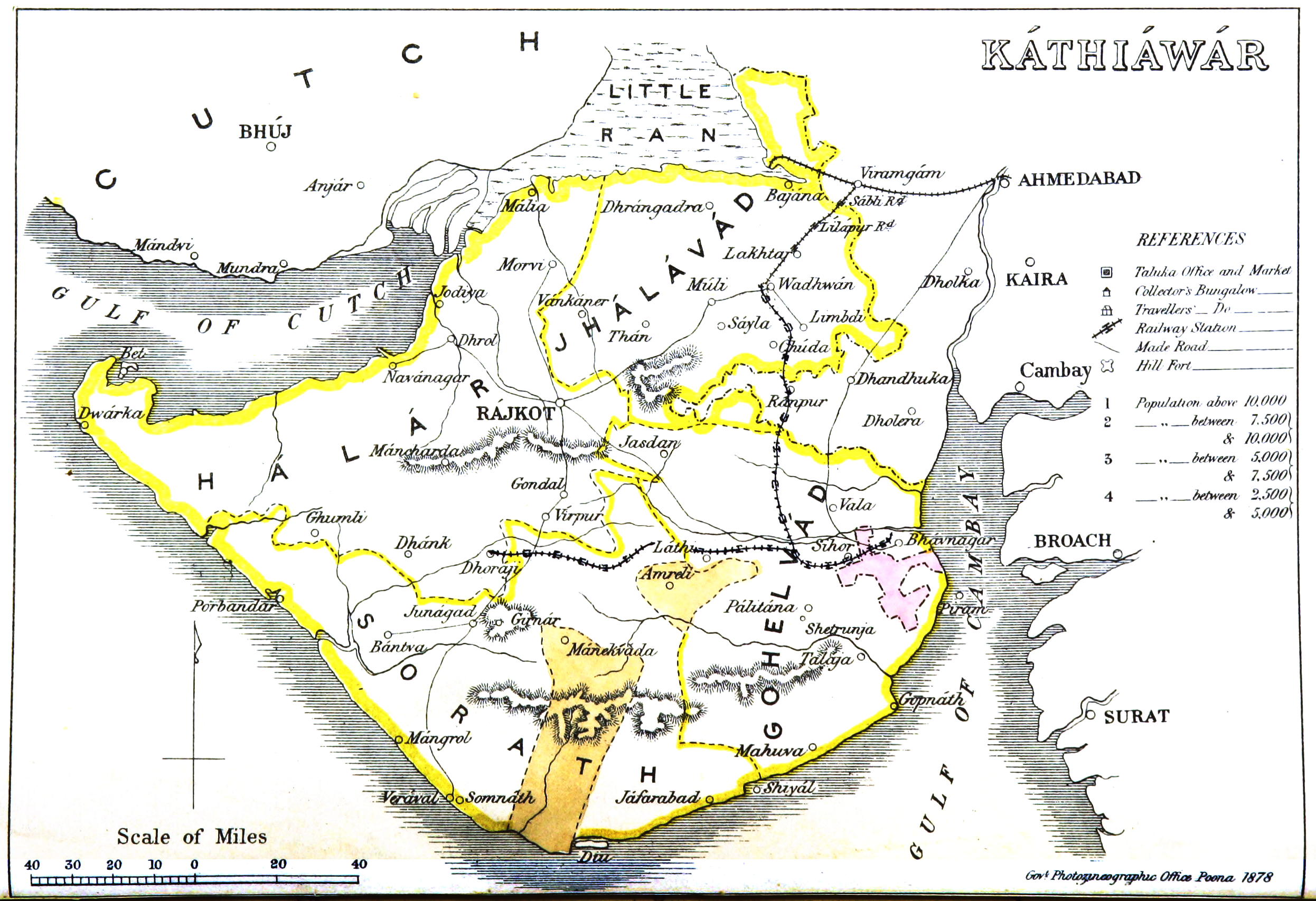
- Jhalavad in kathiawad
- Status: Vassal under Chaulukya dynasty (1090–1244); Sovereign State (1244–1808); Princely state (1858–1948)
- Capital: Patdi (1090–1304) Santalpur (1304–1325) Patdi (1325–1413) Mandal (1413–1425) Kuva-Kanakavati (1425–1488) Halvad (1488–1735) Dhrangadhra (1735–1949)
- Government: Absolute monarchy
- Maharana Raj Sahib
  - 1090–1126: Harpaldev (first)
  - 1942–1948: Meghrajji III (last)
- Dewan
  - 1894–1898: Govindram Sawailal (first)
  - 1945–1948: G.R. Raddi (last)
- History
  - Established as a vassal kingdom under Solanki dynasty: 1090
  - Sack of Kuva: 19 April 1486
  - Accession to the Indian union: 1949

Area
- 1090: 13,800 km^{2} (5,300 sq mi)
- 1892: 3,023 km^{2} (1,167 sq mi)
- 1943: 4,800 km^{2} (1,900 sq mi)

Population
  - 1892: 100,000
  - 1943: 170,563
Preceded by
Solanki dynasty
1943: Lakhtar State
Muli State
Chuda State
Sayla
Ramparda
Munjpur
Succeeded by
1500: Limbdi State
1604: Lakhtar State
1620: Wankaner State
1630: Wadhwan State
1948: India
- Today part of: India

The Kingdom of Jhalavad was a kingdom present in the Kathiawar region of Gujarat. The kingdom came to be known as the Dhrangadhra State after it became a 13-gun salute (15-guns personal) princely state in the nineteenth century. The town of Dhrangadhra served as its capital. It was also known as Halvad-Dhrangadhra State. Halvad once had been the capital of this state. It was ruled by the Jhala clan of Rajputs.

== History ==
=== Early history ===
The state was founded as Jhalawad/Zalawad in 1090 by Rajput ruler Harpal Makwana who led the Jhalas (or Makawanas) from Sindh to Patdi in North Gujarat establishing Kingdom of Jhalavad. He was succeeded by his son Sodhoji, who was appointed 'Mahamandaleshwara' (the great provincial Governor) by Jayasimha Siddharaja. Sodhoji succeeded by his son, Durjansalji, who was appointed as Grihadyaksha (guard of the queen Naikidevi and the two infant sons Mulraja and Bhim), Ran-su-ran (chief of nobles) and Mahamandaleshwara of the Chaulukya dynasty by Ajaypala Solanki, he fought the Battle of Kasahrada on behalf of young Mularaja and defeated the Ghurids led by Muhammad Ghuri.

Santaldev found a new capital Santalpur in 1304, named after him.

Ranmalsinhji I resigned from 1392-1408, he was imprisoned by the Rathores of Barmer in Kotra fort, released by his son Shatrusal dev who brought a large army with him in 1394, later he ploughed up entire kotra with large number of donkeys and burnt down entire Kotra Barmer. Ranmal Sinh I was succeeded by his son Shatrusaldev (also called Satarsalji and Sultanji) in 1408. Shatrushaldev shifted his capital to Mandal. As mentioned in Mirat-i-Sikandri and Tabakát-i-Akbari rebelled 3 times against the Sultan of Gujarat, Ahmed Shah I.

=== Kuva-no-Ker ===
In 1486, Khalil Khan marched against Rana Vaghoji, as he was rebellious. A battle took place between them near Saidpur, 6 km north of Dhrangadhra where Jhalas gained a decisive victory and Khalil Khan was captured, later released. Mahmud Begada accordingly marched towards Kuva (now Kankavati), the capital of Jhalas then. Rana Vaghoji assembled his vassals in his fort and prepared for battle. During the battle Rana Vaghoji's flag fell and his Rani's misunderstood that he is no more. So Vaghoji's 8 queens along with 750 women committed Jal Jauhar by jumping into a well.

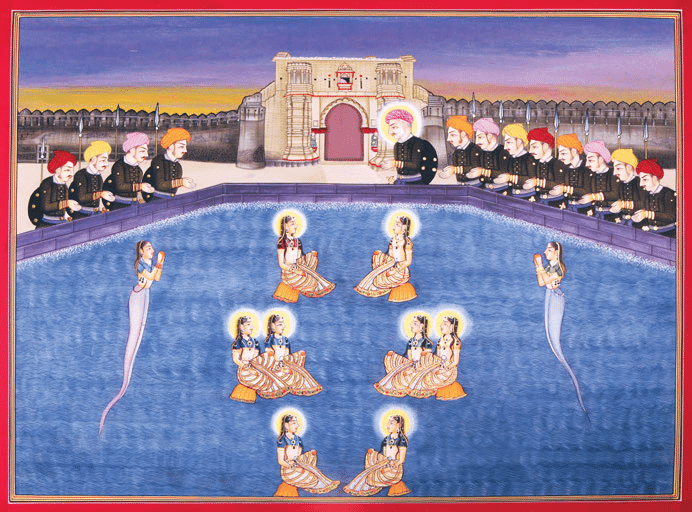
Jal Jauhar of Rana Vaghji's queens at Kuva, 1486

Rana Vaghoji on knowing that his all his wives committed Jauhar, full of grief decided to die in the battlefield with his men. On Rana Vaghoji's death, Mahmud Begada sacked and destroyed the fort of Kuva, the day is known as Kuva-no-ker (disaster of Kuva).

=== Establishment of Halvad ===
After the death of Vaghoji, his son Raidharji established Halvad as Jhalavad's new capital in 1488. Raidharji died in 1499, succeeded by his son Ajajji (or Ajay singh), who was betrayed and deposed by his step brother Ranoji (Ranigdev) with the help of Thakore of Muli. Ajajji along with his brother Sajoji sought asylum in Mewar, as he was married to Rana Raimal's daughter from his Chauhan wife and had his sister Ratan kunwar married to Rana Raimal. Ajajji was granted the title of Raj Rana and thikanas of Ajmer and Bari Sadri. He died fighting in the battlefield of Khanwa against Babur.

In 1523, Ranoji was killed by Malik Shajiv of Dasada, whose father, Malik Bakhan had been killed by Ranoji. Ranoji was succeeded by his son, Mansinhji I (also called Man Singh I). To avenge his father's death, Mansinhji killed Malik Shahjiv, the son of Malik Bakhan, and captured Dasada.

=== Rai Singh I ===
Mansinhji I was succeeded by his son, Rai Singh I (also known as Raya), in 1564. When the Sultan prisoned and imposed a tax of 1 lakh rupees on the Charans and later again 1 lakh rupees on Ahirs of Ahmedabad, threatening to convert them to Islam if they did not pay, Mahatma Isardas promised them of their bail and sought help from Rai Singh twice. Rai Singh then paid the tax on their behalf both times and rescued the Charans and Ahirs.

Rai Singh kettled drums at Dhrol, to which Rao Jasol of Dhrol, his maternal uncle, warned not to. But Rai Singh didn't obey him and Rao Jasol unwilling had to fight with Rai Singh. Rai Singh defeated and killed Jasol Jadeja. In retaliation for Jasol's death, Rao Khengar's brother, Sahibji, along with the army of Kutch, fought the Battle of Mavlia against Rai Singh. Sahibji was slain in the battle, and Rai Singh was severely wounded. Mahatma Isardas composed Hala-Jhala ra kundaliya based on this event.

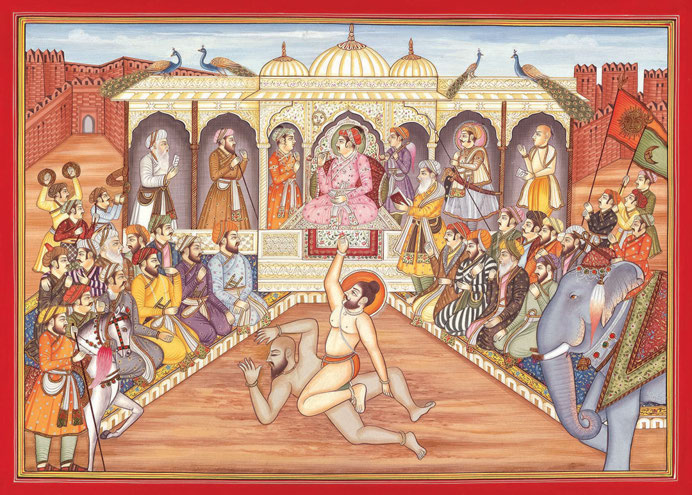
Rana Rai Singh I of Halvad defeats Akbar's wrestler Ekomal Hebat Khan at Fatehpur Sikri

Rai Singh was later taken to Delhi by a group of Sadhus returning from Hinglaj. He remained in Delhi for two years and eventually sought help from Khan-i-Khanan while attending the imperial durbar at Fatehpur Sikri. During the durbar, Hebat Khan 'Ekkomat', a celebrated wrestler in Emperor Akbar’s court, mocked Rai Singh for being dressed like a Sadhu pushed him. In response, Rai Singh gave Hebat Khan such a powerful blow that he died on the spot. The impact of Rai Singh's strike was so great that it displaced a stone in the palace wall.

In 1742, Dhrangadhra, a new capital was found and a fort was built by Rana Rai Singh II. The state is still sometimes styled Halwad(-Dhrangadhra).

=== Colonial era ===
In 1886, Dhrangadhra was raised to a permanent salute of 11 guns and Ranmalsinhji II was granted the title of His Highness. Mansinhji II was raised to a personal salute of 15 guns in 1887 and received a sanad for adoption in 1890. The state had a population of 100,000 in 1892 on 3,023 Square Kilometers km^{2}. Under the British Raj, the colonial Eastern Kathiawar Agency was in charge of Dhrangadhra. The state was entitled to a Hereditary salute of 13 guns as well as hereditary title of Maharaja was granted to its rulers in 1918.

Princely states of as Muli, Lakhtar, Chuda and Sayla along with talukas of Munjpur, Kesharia and Ramparda were attached into Dhrangadhra state under the Attachment scheme, 1943. The state had an area of 4800 km² and population of 170,563 people in 1943. The privy purse was fixed at 380,000 Rupees when it ceased to exist by accession to recently independent India's western state Saurashtra (now in Gujarat) on 15 February 1948.

== List of rulers ==
Sl no	Maharaj-Maharana	From	Till
1	Harpal Dev	1090	1126
2	Sodhshal Dev I	1126	1160
3	Durjanshal Dev	1160	1185
4	Jhalak Devji	1185	1210
5	Arjundev Sinh	1210	1240
6	Devraj	1240	1265
7	Durjanshal Dev II	1266	1280
8	Sur Sinh	1280	1304
9	Shantal Dev	1304	1325
10	Vijaypal	1325	1326
11	Meghraj I	1326	1331
12	Padam Sinh	1331	1340
13	Udai Sinh	1340	1352
14	Prithuraj Sinh	1352	1355
15	Vegad Dev	1355	1368
16	Ram Sinh	1368	1385
17	Vir Sinh	1385	1392
18	Ranmal Sinh I	1392	1408
19	Shatrusal Dev	1408	1420
20	Jet Sinh	1420	1441
21	Ranvir Sinh	1441	1460
22	Bhim Sinh	1460	1469
23	Vagh Vijayraj Sinh	1469	1482
24	Rajdhar Dev	1482	1499
25	Ajay Sinh (Jhala Ajja)	1499	1500
26	Ran Sinh	1500	1523
27	Man Sinh I	1523	1563
28	Rai Sinh II	1563	1587
29	Chandra Sinh	1587	1628
30	Askaran Dev	1628	1634
31	Amar Sinh I	1634	1645
32	Meghraj II	1645	1661
33	Gaj Sinh I	1661	1673
34	Jaswant Sinh I	1673	1717
35	Pratap Sinh	1717	1730
36	Rai Sinh II	1730	1745
37	Gaj Sinh II	1745	1782
38	Jaswant Sinh II	1782	1801
39	Rai Sinh III	1801	1804
40	Amar Sinh II	1804	1843
41	Ranmal Sinh II	1843	1869
42	Man Sinh II	1869	1900
43	Ajit Sinh	1900	1911
44	Ghanshyam Sinh	1911	1942
45	Meghraj Jhala III	1942	1949

== Armed forces ==
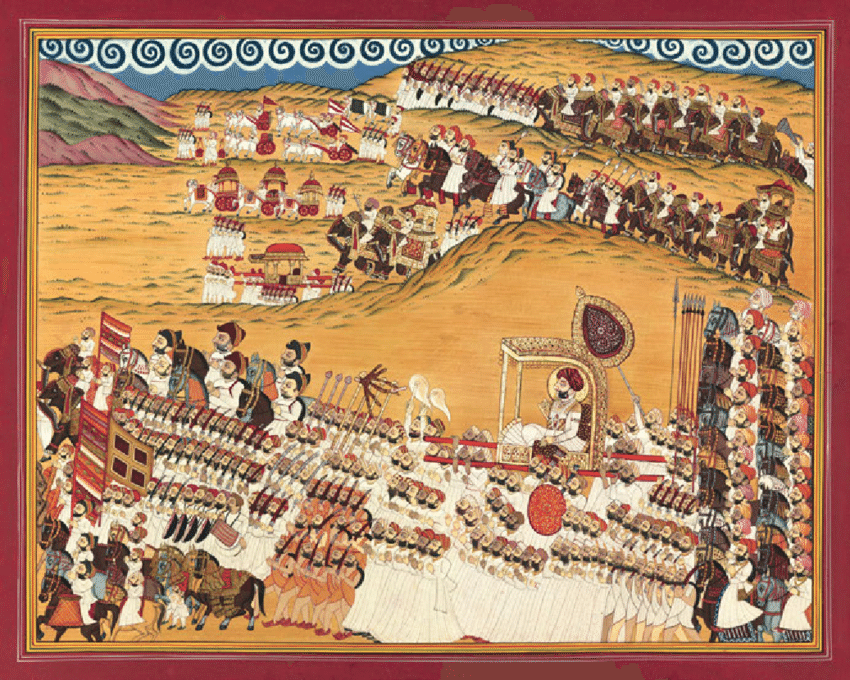
Maharana Raj Bhimdevji of Jhalavad rides to receive his son-in-law Ra Mandalik III of Sorath with his cavalry, 1455.

The earliest reference to the State's military is made by Abul Fazl stating that it had 2,200 villages, 10,000 cavalry and same number of infantry.

=== Dhrangadhra State Forces ===
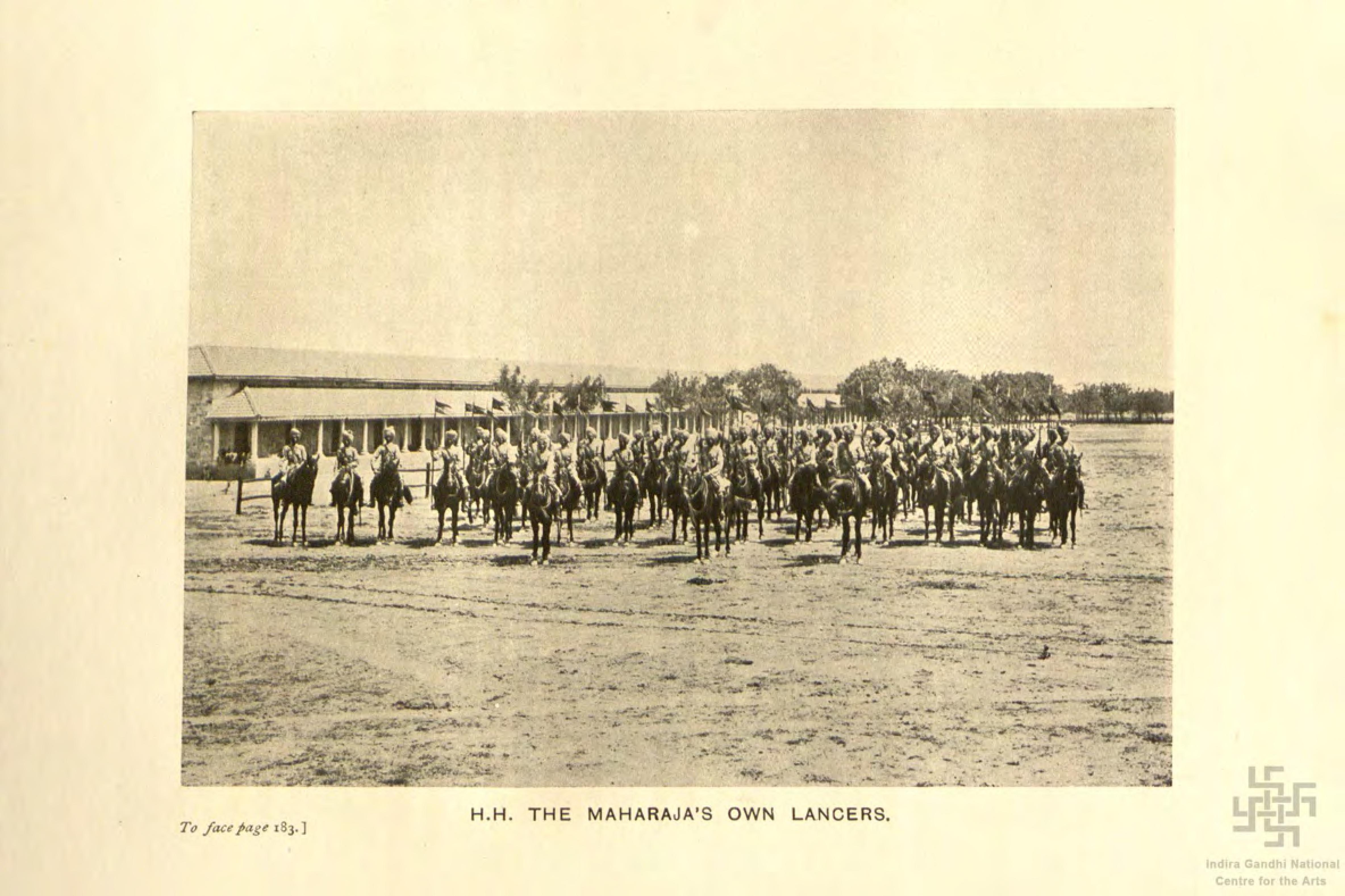
HH Maharana's own lancers, Dhrangadhra State

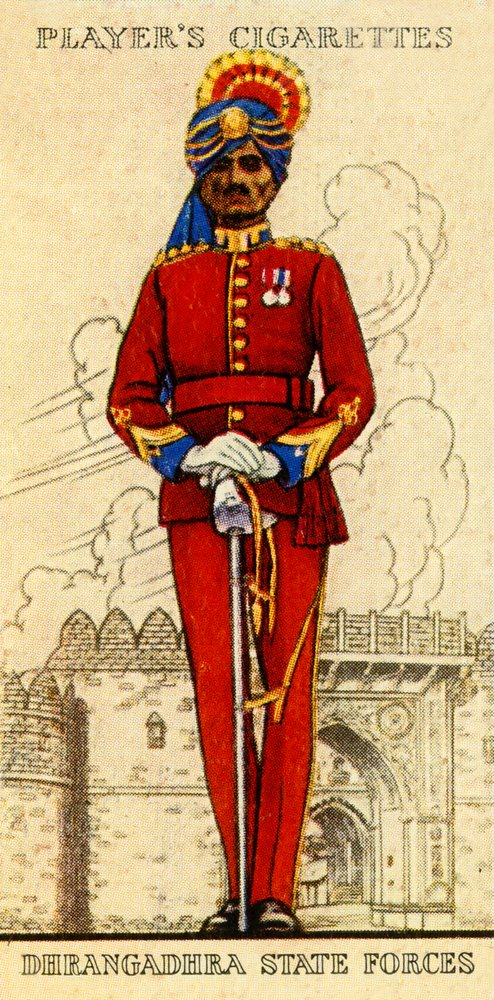
Officer of Dhrangadhra State forces at Delhi, 1936

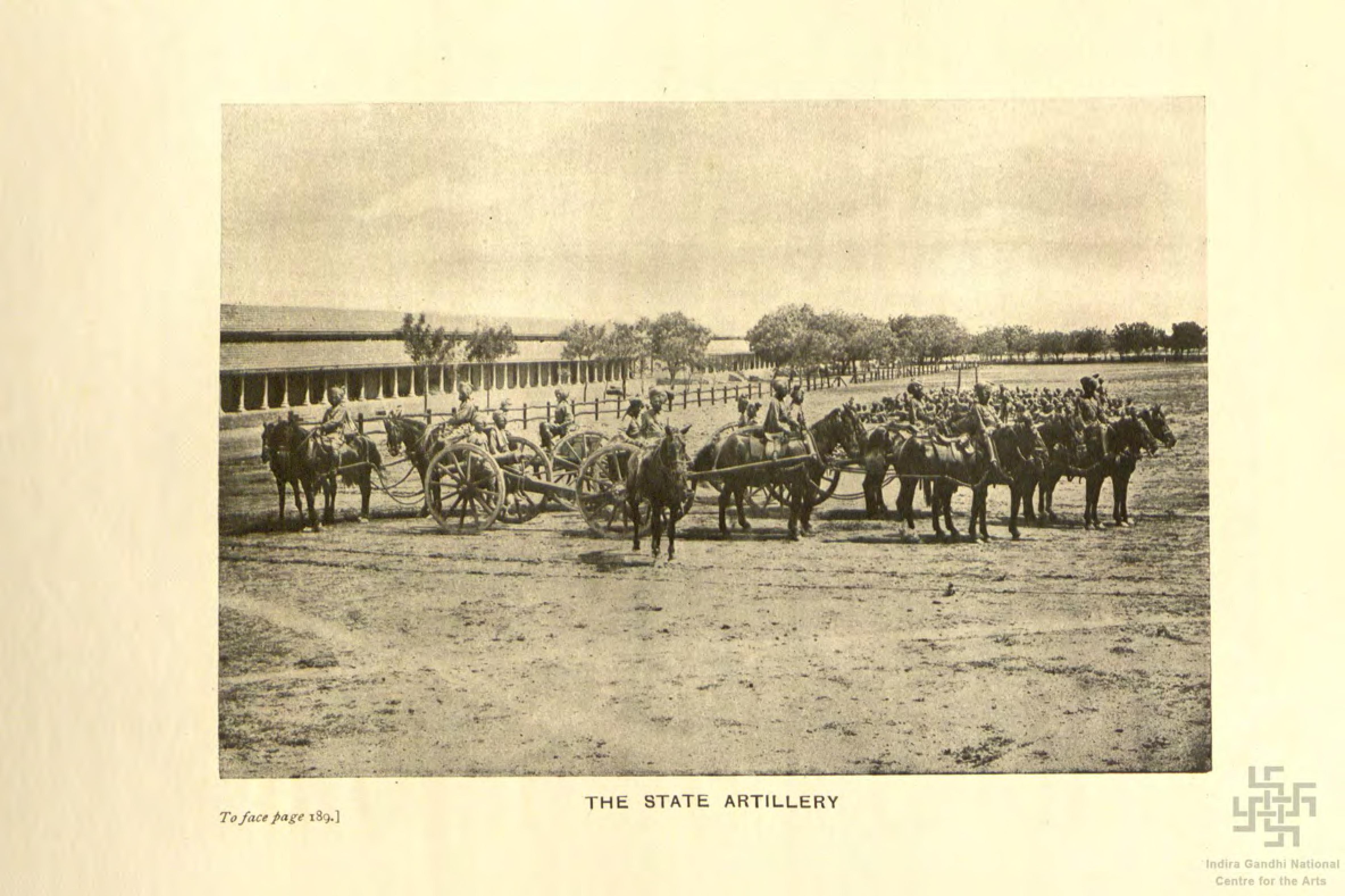
State artillery, Dhrangadhra State

The State had its own artillery, HH Maharana's own lancers, Dhrangadhra Makhwan infantry, state cavalry and police until 1948. The State also had an additional unit called Dhrangadhra bodyguards, which was later renamed as Jhaladhip Bodyguards

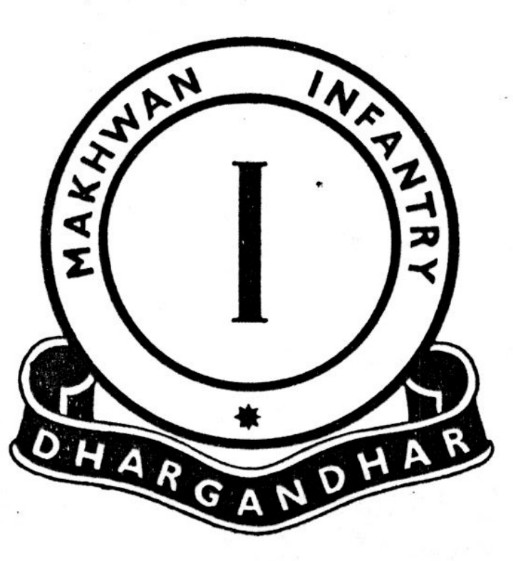
Dhrangadhra Makhwan infantry

HH Maharana's own lancers, Dhrangadhra Makhwan infantry and State artillery were maintained as a cost of 60,000-70,000 rupees per year The State police consisted of 783 men in 1911, while 48 men in Jhaladip Bodyguards and 489 men in Makhwan infantry in 1921.

== Culture ==
=== Coat of Arms and emblem ===
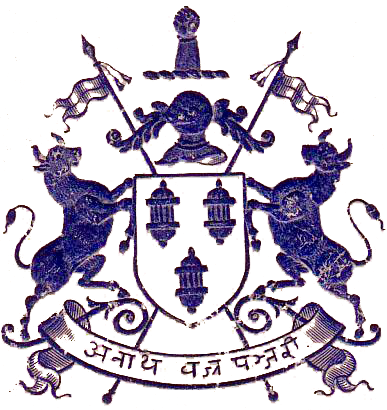
Coat of Arms of Maharana Raj of Dhrangadhra

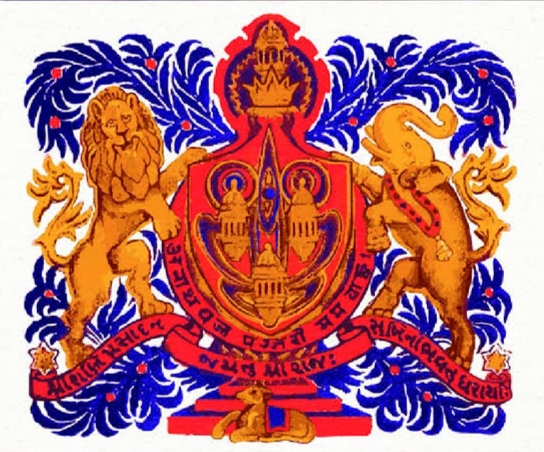
Coat of Arms of Maharana Raj of Dhrangadhra

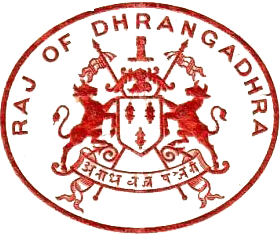
State Emblem of Dhrangadhra

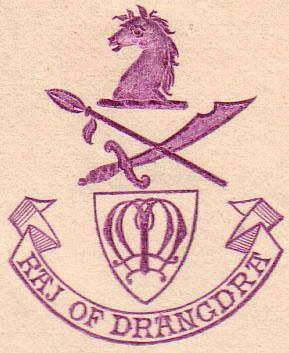
State Emblem of Dhrangadhra

Coat of arms features the motto:"Anatha Vajra Panjaro Mama Bahu" (My arm an adamant shelter for the helpless)

=== Flags ===
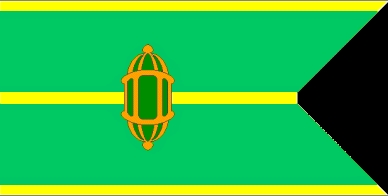
Flag of Dhrangadhra: c. 1911-1946

State flag and standard of the Maharana Raj Sahib, certainly in existence in 1911, replaced by new flags between 1944 and 1946. Approximately 1/2 in proportion, swallow-tailed. The central figure represented a stone canopy ( gonkh ), the traditional emblem of the goddess Sri Shakti Devi, kuldevi of the Jhala Rajputs. It was adopted on subsequent flags and standards and was always present on the princely coat of arms.

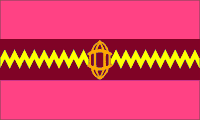
Flag of Dhrangadhra: 1946-1948

National and state flag adopted on October 5, 1946, and abolished along with the state in 1948. Apparent proportions 3:5. The flag was called Sakti Dhwaj because it featured a gonkh in the center, the emblem of the mother goddess Shakti Devi. The two pink stripes represented the sunset and dawn of the night (the blue stripe in the middle) during which the mother goddess built the state. The 18 ripples of the yellow stripe—the shape of which recalled the festoons ( torana ) placed on village gates—alluded to the 1,800 original villages of the principality.

=== Banners ===
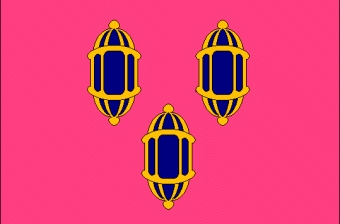
Royal standard banner of Maharana Raj Sahib

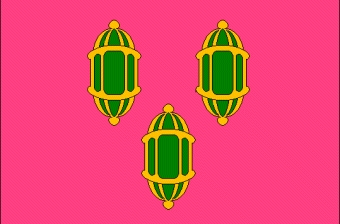
Maharana Raj Sahib's personal banner

Two princely standards are known, contemporary with the state flag, also bright pink and bearing three yellow gonkhs . The difference was in the color of the inside of the gonkhs : blue for the royal standard and green for the personal one of the Maharana Raj Sahib.

=== Stamps ===
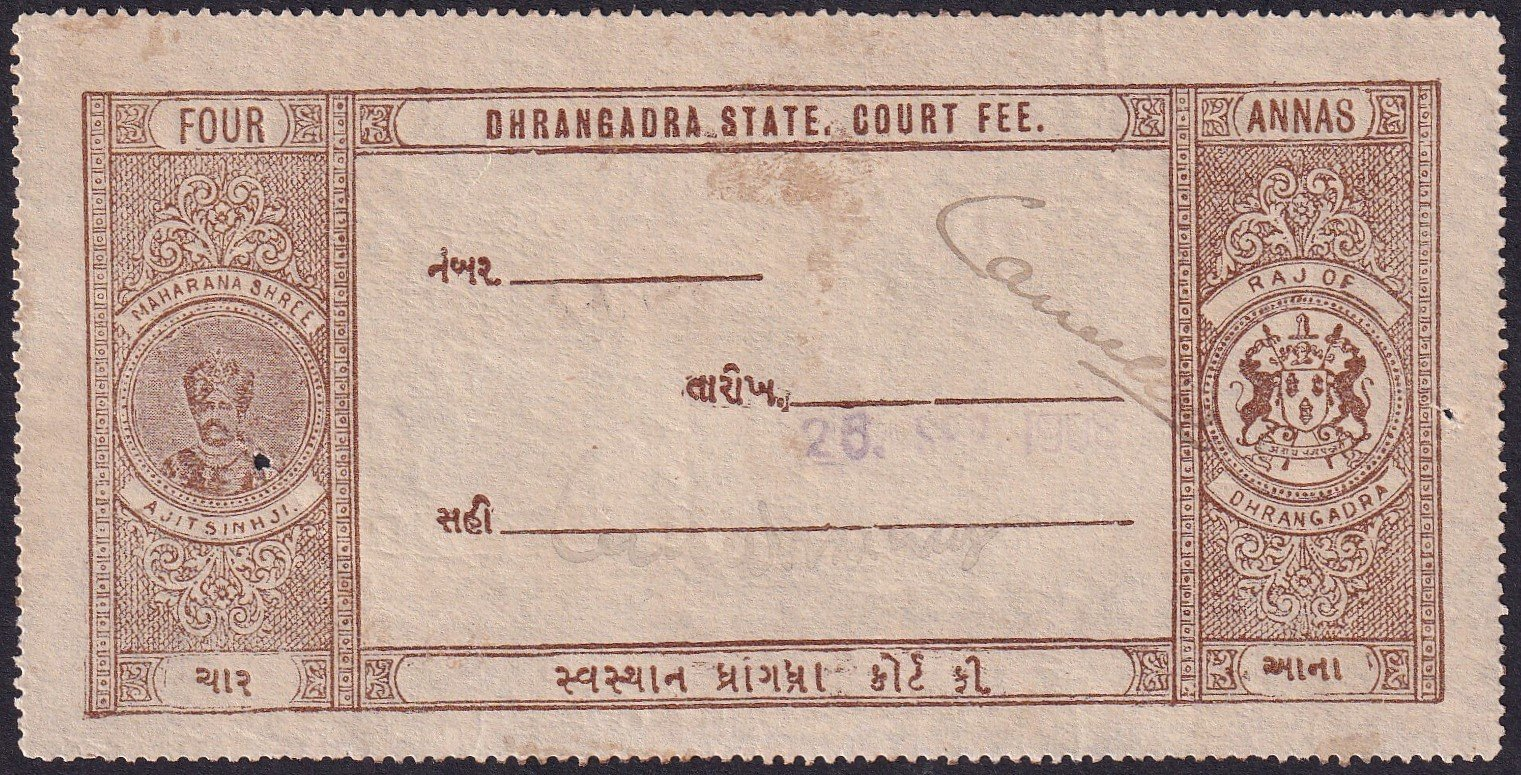
Dhrangadhra state stamp featuring HH Maharana Raj Sahib Ajitsinhji

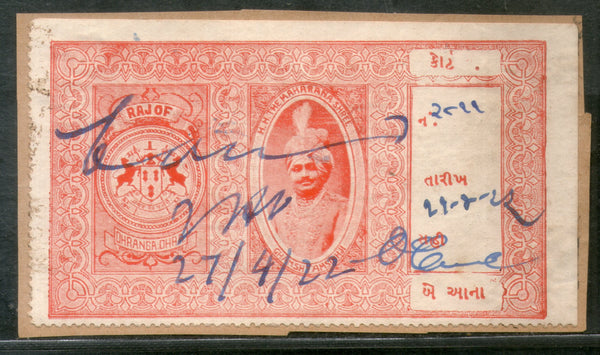
Dhrangadhra state stamp featuring HH Maharana Raj Sahib Ghanshyam Singhji

Stamps featuring the HH Maharana Raj Sahibs: Ajit Singhji and Ghanshyam Singhji

=== Orders of chivalry ===
The Royal House of Dhrangadhra awards a dynastic order of knighthood called the Order of Jhalavad, in six grades.

== See also ==
- Meghrajji III
- Jhalawar State
