= Rai Singh =

Rai Singh may refer to:

- Rai Singh of Bikaner, Ruler of Bikaner
- Rai Singh or Raisinhji I of Halvad, ruler of Jhalavad (Halvad)
- Kanwar Rai Singh, Indian cricketer
- Rai Singh Yadav, Indian military officer

== See also ==
- Rai Sahib
- Rai Bahadur
