= Tikar (disambiguation) =

Tikar may refer to the following places in India

- Tikar, Gujarat
- Tikar, Rajasthan

Tikar may also refer to an ethnic group in Cameroon.
