= Bhojva =

Village in Gujarat, India

Bhojva Bhojawaa
- Neighbourhood
- Bhojva, Viramgam in Gujarat, India
- Coordinates: 23.149673°N 72.026285°E
- Country: India
- State: Gujarat
- District: Ahmedabad district

Population (2011)
  - Total: 4,283

Languages
  - Official: Gujarati, Hindi
- Time zone: UTC+5:30 (IST)
- PIN: 382150
- Telephone code: 91-079
- Vehicle registration: GJ38

Bhojva is a village in Viramgam taluka, Ahmedabad district, Gujarat, India.

== History ==
Before 1947, Bhojva was under Patdi State.

== Demographics ==
Total population is 4283 and there are 886 houses in the village as per census of India 2011.

== Amenities ==
There are two government schools, Bhojva Model School and the Bhojva Primary School. There are two mosques and five Hindu temples.
