= Raisinhji I =

Maharana Raj Sahib of Jhalavad

- Maharana Raj
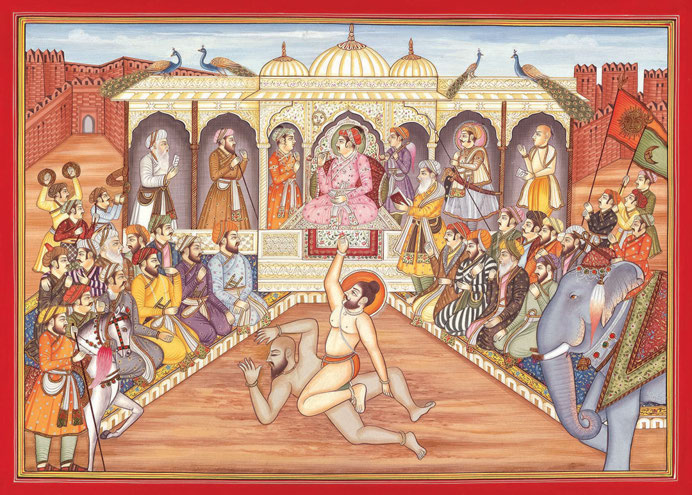
- Maharana Raj Raisinhji I defeats Ekkomal Hebat Khan at Fatehpur Sikri, 1585

Maharana Raj Sahib of Jhalavad
- Reign: 31 Oct 1563-19 Feb 1587
- Predecessor: Mansinhji I
- Successor: Chandrasinhji
- Born: 1540; Halvad, Kingdom of Jhalavad
- Died: 19 February 1587 (aged 46–47); Halvad, Kingdom of Jhalavad
- Spouse: Jivji ba Chavda of Mansa; Dev Kunwar Rathore, daughter of Rai Singh of Bikaner
- Issue: Chattrasalsinhji; Chandrasinhji; Surajmalsinhji; Lakshmibai, (m. to Jam Sataji of Nawanagar)
Names
- Raisinhji I Mansinhji Jhala
- House: Halvad
- Dynasty: Jhala
- Father: Mansinhji I
- Mother: Ganga de Jadeja of Dhrol

Maharana Raj Raisinhji I, also known as Raya and Rai Singh of Halvad, was the 28th ruler of Jhalavad. Raisinhji succeeded his father, Mansinhji I, in 1563 and ruled until his death in 1587.

== Rescuing Ahirs and Charans ==
When the Sultan prisoned and imposed a tax of 1 lakh rupees on the Charans and later again 1 lakh rupees on Ahirs of Ahmedabad, threatening to convert them to Islam if they did not pay, Mahatma Isardas promised them of their bail and sought help from Rai Singh twice. Rai Singh then paid the tax on their behalf both times and rescued the Charans and Ahirs. Mahatma Isardas composition in Rai Singh's praise:

Kārāgrah sū kāḍhiyau, bīdag bījī bār । Aiyo rāyāansigh rā, ghar handā upagār ।।

Which translates:

'Rescued from the prison, twice (Charans and Ahirs). The one who comes to Rai Singh, gets a favour'

Another verse is as follows:

Kar fālūan gochh ghaḍae snap kāḍhū, dhaṣhat tele hāth gharū। Rāyāansīh sarīso rājā, koī hove to dhīj karūan ॥॥

Which translates:

'Taking the burning shell in the hand, Holding the snake in my hands, By putting my hand in burning hot oil, I can say to the world that there is no other king like Rai Singh on this Earth'

== Battles of Dhrol and Malia ==
=== Battle of Dhrol ===
During this period, Raisinhji went to Dhrol to visit his maternal uncle, Jasoji Jadeja, the Raja of Dhrol . While they were playing a game of cards, the sound of drums was heard. Jasoji, offended by this, ordered an inquiry to find out who had dared to sound drums within sight of Dhrol. The offender turned out to be an ascetic named Makan Bharti, who was en route to Dwarka. Upon hearing this, Jasoji's anger subsided.

Raisinhji then provocatively asked what would happen if another chief were to sound drums near Dhrol. Jasoji replied that any such person would have his drums broken. Taking this as a challenge, Raisinhji returned to Halvad, gathered an army, and marched to Dhrol, where he deliberately sounded his drums.

Jasoji attempted to stop him but failed. A battle broke out between the two sides at Dhrol on 3 December, 1565, and Jasoji was mortally wounded. Before dying, he declared that Sahebji Jadeja, the brother of Khengarji I the Rao of Kutch, would avenge his death. A charan (bard or messenger) carried this message to Kutch. Mahatma Isardas composed Hala-Jhala ra kundaliya based on this event.

=== Battle of Malia ===
Upon hearing of the duty imposed on him, Sahebji prepared to depart, with the support of his brother, Khengarji I the Rao of Kutch, who was eager to send him away. Sahebji crossed the Rann and confronted Raisinhji near Malia on 2nd March, 1566. A fierce battle ensued in which Sahibji was killed and Raisinhji was left for dead on the battlefield.

== Killing Hebat Khan ==
However, Raisinhji survived. He was taken to Delhi by a group of Sadhus returning from Hinglaj, probably Makhan Bharti. At the same time, Khan Khanan had been ordered to march against Sultan Muzaffar Shah III of Gujarat. Raisinhji met Khan Khanan at the Imperial Durbar held by Akbar. Raisingh was mocked for being dressed like a Sadhu by a celebrated wrestler 'Ekkomal' Hebat Khan. In response, Rai Singh gave Hebat Khan such a powerful blow that he died on the spot. The impact of Rai Singh's strike was so great that it displaced a stone in the palace wall. This occurrence gave rise to the following couplet :-

Katari Amare-shari, Toga ri talwar. Hathal Raya Saghri, deli-re Darbar

Translation:

The dagger of Amarsingh-The sword of Togáji. The palm of Rai Singh (have marked) the darbár of Delhi.

== Reinstallation and death ==
Then Raisinghji resented his case to Khan Khanan, explaining that he had been left for dead and would not be recognized if he returned to Jhalavad.

The General advised him to return and declare his identity. Raisinhji followed this advice and successfully reclaimed his position. However, his return was marred by personal loss — all his wives except one refused to return to him, saying they considered him dead. He later died at Ghantila in a battle fighting against Deda subclan of Jadejas.
