= Nava Ghantila =

- town
- Country: India
- State: Gujarat
- District: Surendranagar

Languages
  - Official: Gujarati, Hindi
- Time zone: UTC+5:30 (IST)
- Vehicle registration: GJ
- Website: gujaratindia.com

Nava Ghantila is a village of Surendranagar district in the Indian state of Gujarat, with approximately 600 residents. It is located near to Tikar.
