= Ramparda =

Village in Gujarat, India

Ramparda is a village and former petty princely state on Saurashtra peninsula in Gujarat, western India.

== History ==
The non-salute princely state in Jhalawar prant was ruled by Kathi Chieftains. It comprised only the village.

In 1901 it has a population of 299, yielding a state revenue of 625 Rupees (1903–4, nearly all from land), paying a 75 Rupees tribute, to the British and Sukhdi State.
