= Mahatma Isardas =

Hindu saint-poet

Bhakta-Kavi-Śrī Mahātmā Īsardāsa
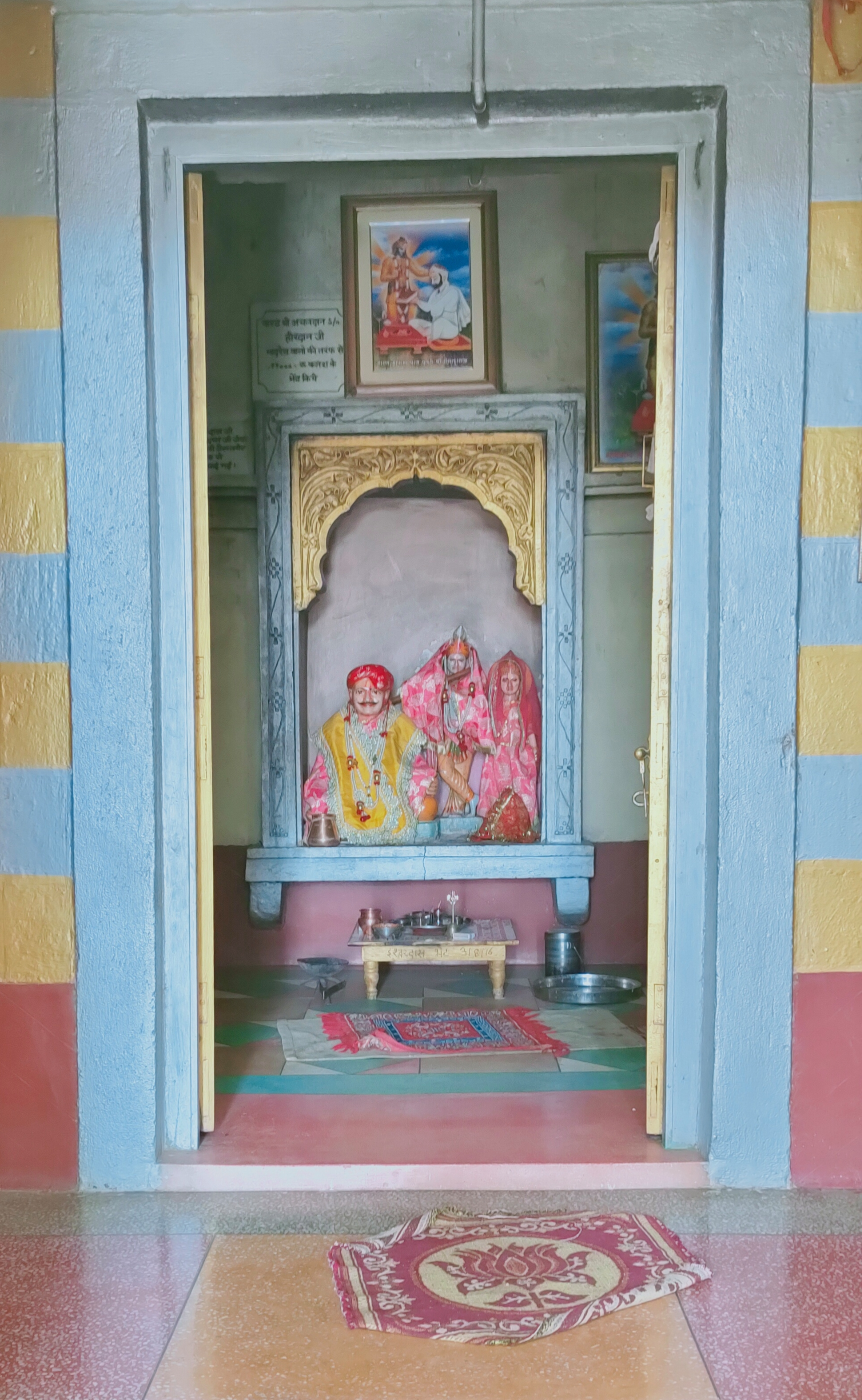
- Temple of Mahatma Isardasji (left) along with Rādhā-Kṛṣṇa at his birth-place at Bhadresh; a village in Rajasthan.

Personal life
- Born: c. 1539 AD Bhadresh, Rajasthan, India
- Died: c. 1618 AD Luni River, Rajasthan, India
- Spouse: Devalbai; Rajbai
- Children: Jagoji Barhath; Chundoji Barhath; Gopaldasji Barhath; Jesaji Barhath; Kahanadasji Barhath
- Parents: Suraji Barhath (father); Amar Bai (mother)
- Notable works: Hariras; Deviyan; Hala-Jhala Ra Kundaliya
- Known for: Poems, Krishna-Bhakti movements
- Honors: Mahātmā; Bhakta-Kavi-Śrī

Religious life
- Religion: Hinduism
- Denomination: Vaishnavism
- Philosophy: Bhagavata-Dharma

Religious career
- Teacher: Śrī Pītāmbar Bhaṭṭa

Mahatma Isardas (Sanskrit: भक्त-कवी-श्री महात्मा ईसरदास IAST: Bhakta-Kavi-Śrī Mahātmā Īsardāsa) was a 16th-century Indian Hindu saint-poet, who is revered as a devotee of Lord Krishna in Gujarat and Rajasthan states of India. He is associated with having done miraculous works, and due to his high devotion to Krishna, he was called Īsara-so-parameśvara (Īsardāsa is a manifestation of the Almighty himself).

Popular creations like Deviyan and Hariras (bhakti kavya) and Hala-Jhala ra Kundaliya (veer-ras kavya) are credited to Isardas. Also known as 'Sant Mahatma Isardas' by his devotees. The language of Isardas' compositions is Dingal.

== Early life ==
Isardas Barhath was born in a Vaishnava Charan family in the 16th century c. AD 1539 (VS 1595) in Bhadresh village of Barmer district in Rajasthan, India. His father Suraji Barhath was a devotee of Krishna. His mother was Amar Bai. His parents died when he was a child, and thereafter he was brought up and educated by his paternal uncle Ashanand Barhath, a learned vedic-scholar himself.

Panarāsau pichchāṇave, janamyā Isaradas | cāraṇa varaṇ chakār mean, uṇ din huanvo ujās ||

While living in Bhadresh, Isardas had two sons—Jagoji and Chundoji from his wife Deval Bai (first marriage). He got depressed after the death of Deval Bai. To distract his mind, in 1559, Ashanand took him on a pilgrimage to Dwarka.

== Isardas and Jam Rawal ==
In 1560, while returning, both of them were invited to attend the court of Jam Rawal in Jamnagar. There Isardas introduced himself and displayed his poetic talent by reciting some Dingal verses he composed. Jam Rawal was very impressed with his talent and offered Isardas the position of Raj Kavi (poet-laureate). His uncle Ashanand returned to Marwar after some time.

In Jamnagar, Isardas studied the classics, especially the Bhagavata under Pitambar Bhatta, who was an erudite scholar of the Jam Rawal's court. Gradually the devotional aspects of his life developed to a sufficiently advanced stage. In his maturity, his fame soon spread all over Saurashtra and Gujarat which brought him plenty of wealth and land grants.

Isardas and Jam Rawal had a very close relationship. After learning about the demise of Isardas's first wife, king Jam Rawal arranged for the second marriage of Isar Das in a respected Charan family of Gujarat. He was about 22 years old at the time of his second marriage. He had three sons–Gopaldasji, Jesaji, and Kahanadasji and one daughter from his second wife, Rajbai. Rajbai was the daughter of a Charan of the Avsura branch, Panthabhai Gadhavi.

Jagat Temple was built by Jam Rawal in Dwarka on the insistence of Isardas, a devotee of Krishna.

Jam Rawal presented Isardas with 'Kod Pasav' and also awarded the villages of Sanchana, Rangpar, Virvadarka, Goondho, etc. as jagir (fief).

== Miracles ascribed to Isardas ==
There are many legends/miracles popular among the devotees about Isardas, and also narrated in Vansh Bhaskar. Some of them are:

=== Tax on Charans ===
The Sultan of Ahmedabad (Gujarat) imposed a tax of one lakh rupees on the Charans, who were horse-traders by profession, thinking they were wealthy. Isardas guaranteed their bail but could not pay on time. The Sultan imprisoned Isardas and threatened to kill him after the new moon. It is said that Isardas stopped the rising of the moon. Sultan believed it to be a divine sign and Isardas was given a further period of one month. When the news of the imprisonment of Isardas reached the king of Halvad, Rana Rai Singh, he delivered the payment to the Sultan of Ahemdabad.

=== Isardas and Ahirs of Gujarat ===
Similarly, this Sultan also taxed the Ahirs of Kathiawar and threatened to convert them to Islam and make them Muslims in the event of non-payment. Isardas upon hearing the plight of Ahirs, again promised to pay the bail of one lakh rupees. Isardas requested Rana Rai Singh of Halvad again and he did this by selling gold from his treasury. This way Rai Singh repaid and rescued them. Isradas's compositions in Rai Singh's praise:

Kārāgrah sū kāḍhiyau, bīdag bījī bār । Aiyo rāyāansigh rā, ghar handā upagār ।।

Another verse is as follows:

Kar fālūan gochh ghaḍae snap kāḍhū, dhaṣhat tele hāth gharū। Rāyāansīh sarīso rājā, koī hove to dhīj karūan ॥॥

Which translates:

'Taking the burning shell in the hand, Holding the snake in my hands, By putting my hand in burning hot oil, I can say to the world that there is no other king like Rai Singh on this Earth'

=== Saving Karan Singh ===
Once, Karan, who was the son of Thakur Bija Saravaya of Amreli in the state of Junagarh, died of a snake bite. He was bitten on the day of his wedding to which Isardas was invited to attend. When he arrived and found out about the incident he was very saddened. Isardas started praying to the Lord and resurrected him.

Ghānantar mayanka haṇū sukra dhāvo, nar pālak rudra riṣh nivaḍa।

Ek bāragī karaṇ uṭhāḍo, branapaṭ taṇo prāgavaḍa ॥

Jo tū āi nahī jīvāḍai, saravahiyon dīnā cho sāma।

Tūjh taṇo oṣhad dhānantara, ke din fir āvasī kām ॥

Karaṇ jīvasī guṇ māne kavi, kei jagat chā sarasī kāj ।

Amī kevaṇ din arath āvasī, avis nahī jo sasiyar āj ॥

Ānṇe oṣhad karaṇ uṭhāḍo, jag sah māne sānch jim ।

Haṇumat lakhaṇ taṇī parasidh huva, kavaṇ mānasī hutī kim ॥

=== Isardas and Sanga Gaur ===
Once on his way to Dwarka (according to Kaviraja Muraridan, while going to Amreli), Isardas made a stop in a small village on the banks of the river Venu. He stayed at the home of a poor Rajput named Sanga Gaur for a night. Sanga was glad at the visit of a Charan Despite being poor, Sanga Gaur took great care of Isardas. And when Isardas started going the next day, Sanga prayed that he should accept a blanket as a gift. Isardas was moved and replied that he will come back in a few days and take the blanket. Meanwhile, Sanga came to the Venu river one day after grazing his animals. He was crossing the river when it flooded and it swept along Sanga with the animals and led to his drowning. While drowning, he called to the nearby standing people to tell his mother to offer a banket to Isardas when he returns. In a few days, Isardas arrived at Sanga's house where Sanga's mother prepared a meal for him. But Isardas asked, where is Sanga, I won't eat food without him. Hearing this, Sanga's mother, filled with grief, started crying. Finally, she narrated the tragedy that happened with her son at the river. Hearing this, Isardas stood up demanding to be taken at the spot where Sanga drowned. Isardas reached the crossing point at Venu river and started calling out loudly to Sanga. People gathered there heard Sanga replying that he was coming and in a while, Sanga came out alive from the water with his animals. They went home and ate together.

There are few Dingal couplets relating this incident:

Nadī bahuantī jāya, sād j sāangariya diyau।Kahajyāan morī māya, kavi ne dīje kāmalī ।।

Translates as: While going out into the river, Sanga said to his mother that she give a blanket to the poet.

== Hariras ==
Hariras is an influential Hindu Vaishnavite religious text in which absolute divinity has been described and praised in adulatory verses. Many people also read it regularly in Rajasthan and Gujarat. Numerous Gujarati as well as Hindi editions of Hariras have been published.

Hariras is also read out to the dead, similar to the way shlokas from Shrimad Bhagvadgita are recited at someone's passing.

== Deviyan ==
Deviyan is a religious text of Shaktism meant for daily prayer routine. It is sung in praise of divinity in female form, Shakti. Deviyan is compared to the sacred text Devi Mahatmya .

This verse of Keshavdas Gadan, a contemporary saint-poet, is very popular on the subject of Hariras:

Jag prājalato jāṇa, agha dāvānala ūparān । Rachiyo rohaḍ rāṇa, mamad harī ras sūravat ॥

== Death ==
After living in Gujarat-Kathiawar for 49 years till the age of 65, Isardas decided to return to his birthplace and spent the rest of his life there. Accordingly, he traveled and reached Bhadresh from Kathiawar. After spending some time in Bhadresh, he built a hut on the banks of river Luni and lived there.

He continued to do Bhagavat-bhajan throughout for the remaining time. Mahatma Isardas entered Jalsamadhi at about 80 years of age, in AD 1618 (Vikram Samvat 1675).

== Legacy ==
Mahatma Isardas was revered by and had considerable influence on kings, royals, nobles as well as common people.

18th-century saint-poet Pirdan Lalas himself regarded Isardas as his 'Bhava-Guru' (spiritual preceptor) and 'Manas-Guru'. Pirdan's compositions in this regard:

Īsāṇanda guru chit māan āanṇāan, vaidavyās nāan pachhe vaṣhāṇāan । —Guṇ Nārāiṇ Neh

Chaḍhaiyā chhe chanchale, alap guru Isar āpe। Āratī alab ārādhanā Isarajī nā āratī ॥ —Guṇ Alap Ārādh

Bārahaṭha ane rishi barābarī, vedavyās Īsar baḍā ॥॥॥

Īsar bāraṭh isau rame bainkuanṭha main rāanmati।

Īsar bāraṭh isau gyāanna govid jisī gati ।

Īsar bāraṭh isau alaṣh rāshe siri ūpari ।

Īsar bāraṭh isau idhakamā nimo aparanpari |

Tu huo dās īsar taṇoan, manachhā vāchhā doṣh dahi।

Kisan rā pāv bheanṭaṇ kare, guru Īsar rā gyāana grahi ॥

—Guṇ Gyāana Charit

Arijaṇ ne akarūr vyās ripi bāraṭ īsar ।

Sinikādikhi samarāan, birid pe bāraṭ īsara।

Brahma sataguru huantā vaḍo, īsaradās anūp ।

—Guṇ Ajanpājāp

Suryamal Misran had mentioned Mahatma Isardas in his voluminous work Vansh Bhaskar as a saint and poet with epithets such as 'Kalikālabhāgavat Mūurddha Maṇi Dvārahaṭh Sukavīshvara' and 'Mahābhakteshwaradāsa'.

In his Bhaktamal, poet Nabhadas had also mentioned the name of Mahatma Isardas among fourteen Charan saints.

Many later poets were influenced by Hariras and Deviyan, sacred texts of the Vaishnavites and the Shaktas respectively, prominent among whom were Surajanji (Katha Harigun), Udoji Adinga (Vishnu Charit), Muni Man (Gyanrasa), and Veni Ram (Jinarasa), .

Kaviraj Bankidas Asiya, Suryamal Misran, and several other poets were influenced by the veer-ras kavya (martial poetry) composition, Hala-Jhala ra Kundaliya.

== Works ==
The major compositions of the poet are as follows:

1. Harirasa
2. Chota Harirasa
3. Guna Bhagwat Hansa
4. Garud-Purana
5. Vala-Leela
6. Ninda Stuti
7. Deviyan
8. Guna Aagama
9. Guna Vairaat
10. Sama Parva
11. Rasa Kailasa
12. Hala-Jhala Ra Kundaliya
13. Daan Leela
