= Rai Singh of Bikaner =

Raja of Bikaner from 1571 to 1612

Raja Rai Singh
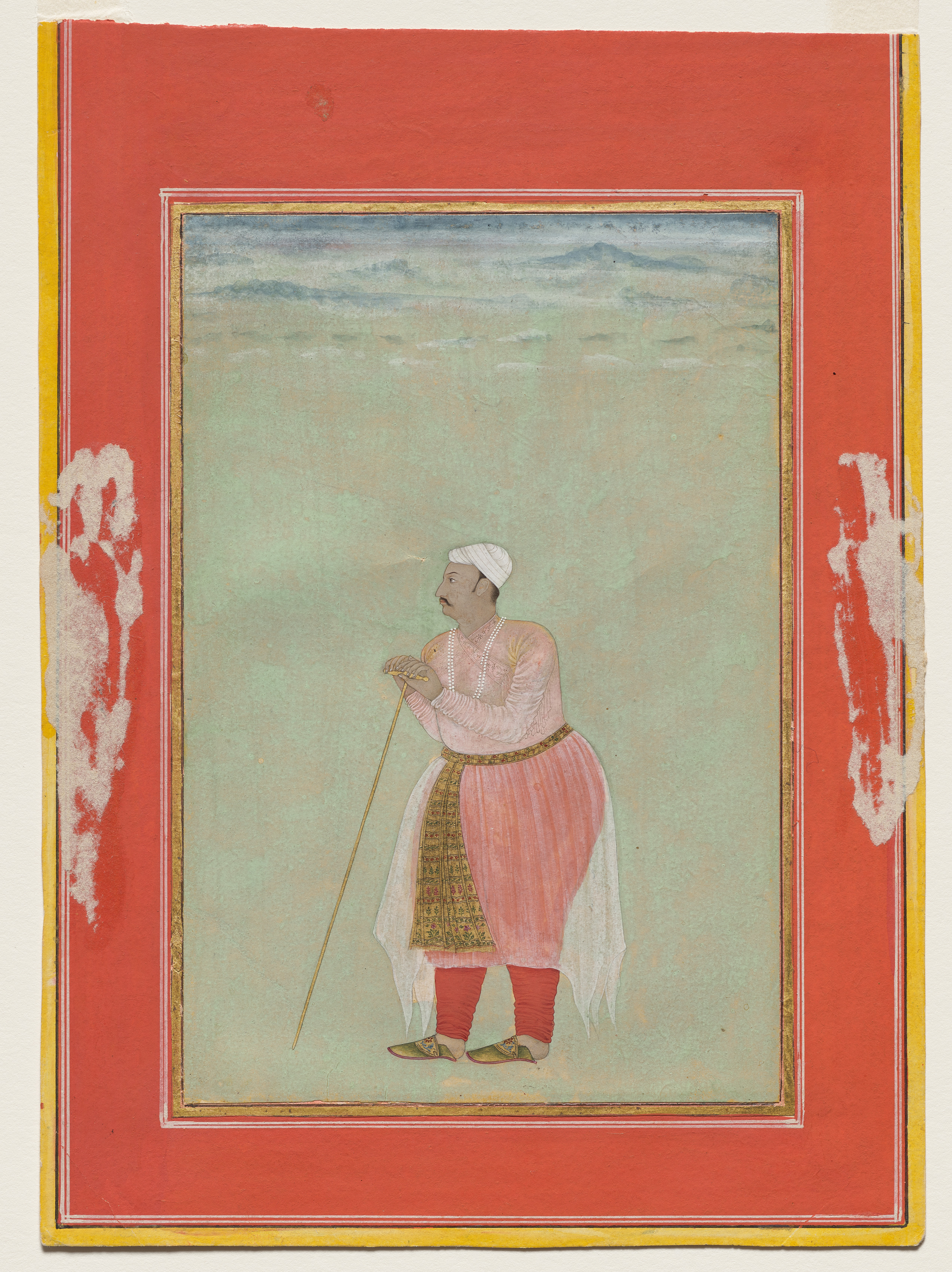
- Portrait of Maharaja Rai Singh of Bikaner, Cleveland Museum of Art c.1610

Raja of Bikaner
- Reign: 1571 – 20 January 1612
- Predecessor: Rao Kalyan Mal
- Successor: Rao Dalpat Singh

Subahdar of Lahore
- Emperor: Akbar I
- Predecessor: Bhagwant Das
- Successor: Khawaja Shamsuddin Khawafi
- Born: 20 July 1541
- Died: 20 January 1612 (aged 70); Burhanpur, Khandesh Subah, Mughal Empire
- Spouse: Sisodiniji Jaswant Deiji of Mewar; Bhatiyaniji Ganga Deiji of Jaisalmer; Tomarji Dhrupad Deiji of Lakhasar in Bikaner; Sodhiji (Parmarji) Bhan Deiji of Amarkot; Nirbanji (Chauhanji) Chatra Deiji of Khandela; Bhatiyaniji Jasoda Deiji of Pugal in Bikaner; Bhatiyaniji Amolak Deiji of Pugal in Bikaner
- Issue: Bhupat Singh; Dalpat Singh; Sur Singh; Hanwant Singh; Kishan Singh; Sujas Deiji m.to Mughal Emperor Jahangir; Yash Deiji (m.to Raja Virbhadra Ju Dev of Bandhavgarh); Dev Deiji (m.to Rana Rai Singh of Halvad)
- House: House of Bikaner
- Dynasty: Rathore dynasty
- Father: Rao Kalyan Mal
- Mother: Songariji (Chauhanji) Bhagwat Deiji d.of Rao Akhairaj of Pali in Jalore

Raja Rai Singh (20 July 1541 – 20 January 1612) was the Bikawat Rathore Rajput ruler of Bikaner between 1571 and 1612. He served Mughal Emperor Akbar first as the Subahdar of the province of Lahore. He participated in the imperial Mughal campaigns in Gujarat and Malwa, and later served as the imperial governor in Burhanpur and Lahore.He was also the father-in-law of Mughal Emperor Jahangir.

== Biography ==
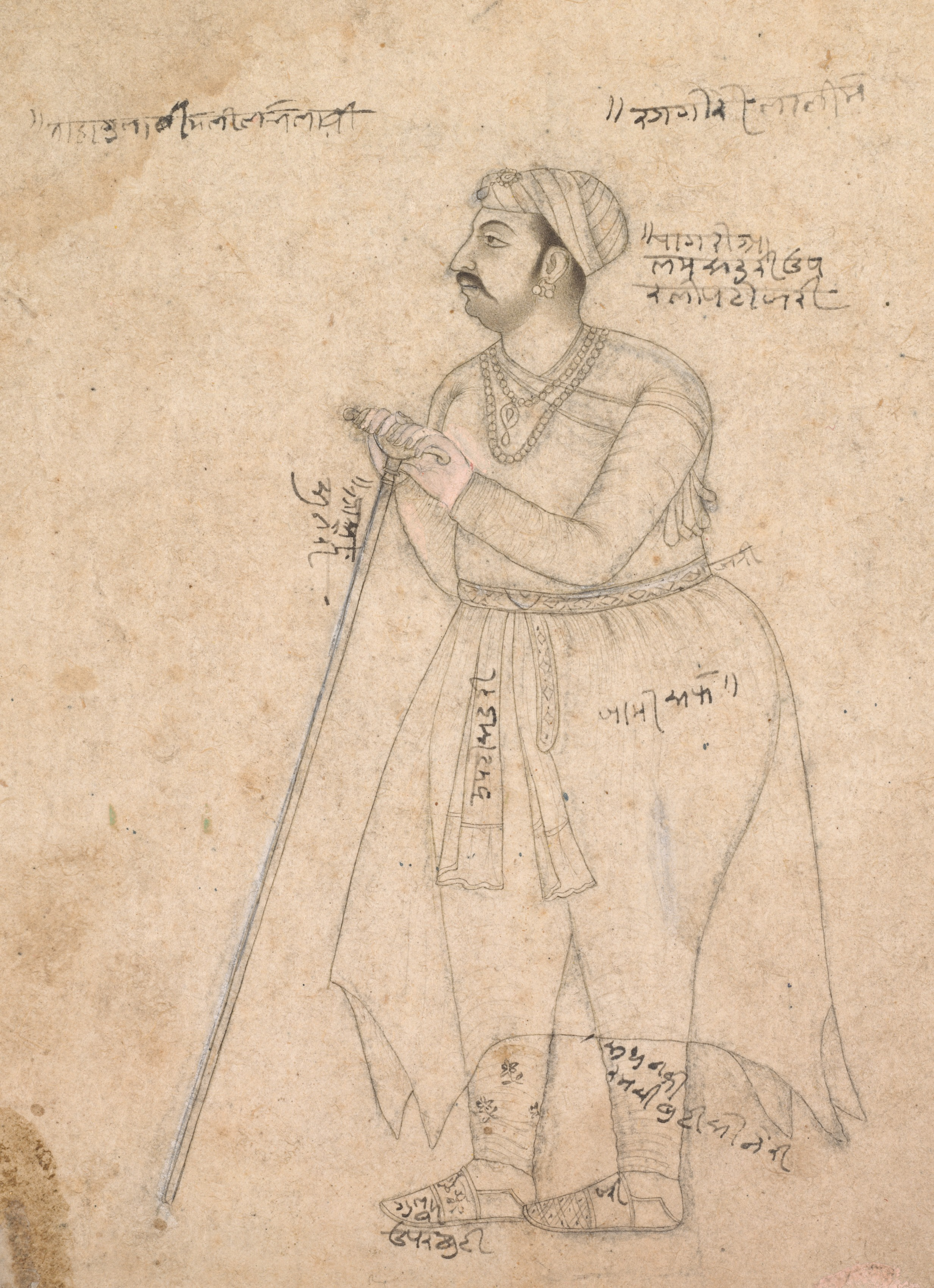
Portrait of Maharaja Rai Singh of Bikaner by Nur Muhammad c.1605

He was born in 1541. After the death of his father in 1571, Rai Singh assumed the rule of Bikaner. In 1576, when the emperor Akbar was visiting the shrine at Ajmer, he went there with 6000 horse and paid homage to the emperor.

Subsequently, Rai went on to join the force against the Gujarat Sultanate. In the Gujarat campaign, Bikaneri forces suffered heavy losses. On the completion of the campaign, Rai Singh received the title of Raja as well as a grant of 52 parganas.

In 1585, he was sent to Khandesh in the Deccan. Between 1587 and 1592, he was the general in command on the Deccan front. In 1593, when a large force was assembled against Burhan Nizam Shah II, he served as the principal advisor to Prince Daniyal Mirza. He was made the governor of Burhanpur.

By the 1590s, tension had grown between Rai and the minister Karam Chand Bachhawat, who was at the helm of affairs in Bikaner while Rai served in imperial campaigns. In 1595, after a plot to assassinate Rai was discovered, Karam Chand had to flee Bikaner.

In 1604, the emperor Akbar died and Jahangir ascended the Mughal throne. The same year, Karam Chand also died. Rai was once again dispatched as governor to Burhanpur, where he proceeded with his son Sur Singh. In 1612, he died in Burhanpur. Three of his queens and three concubines performed sati on his pyre.

== Legacy ==
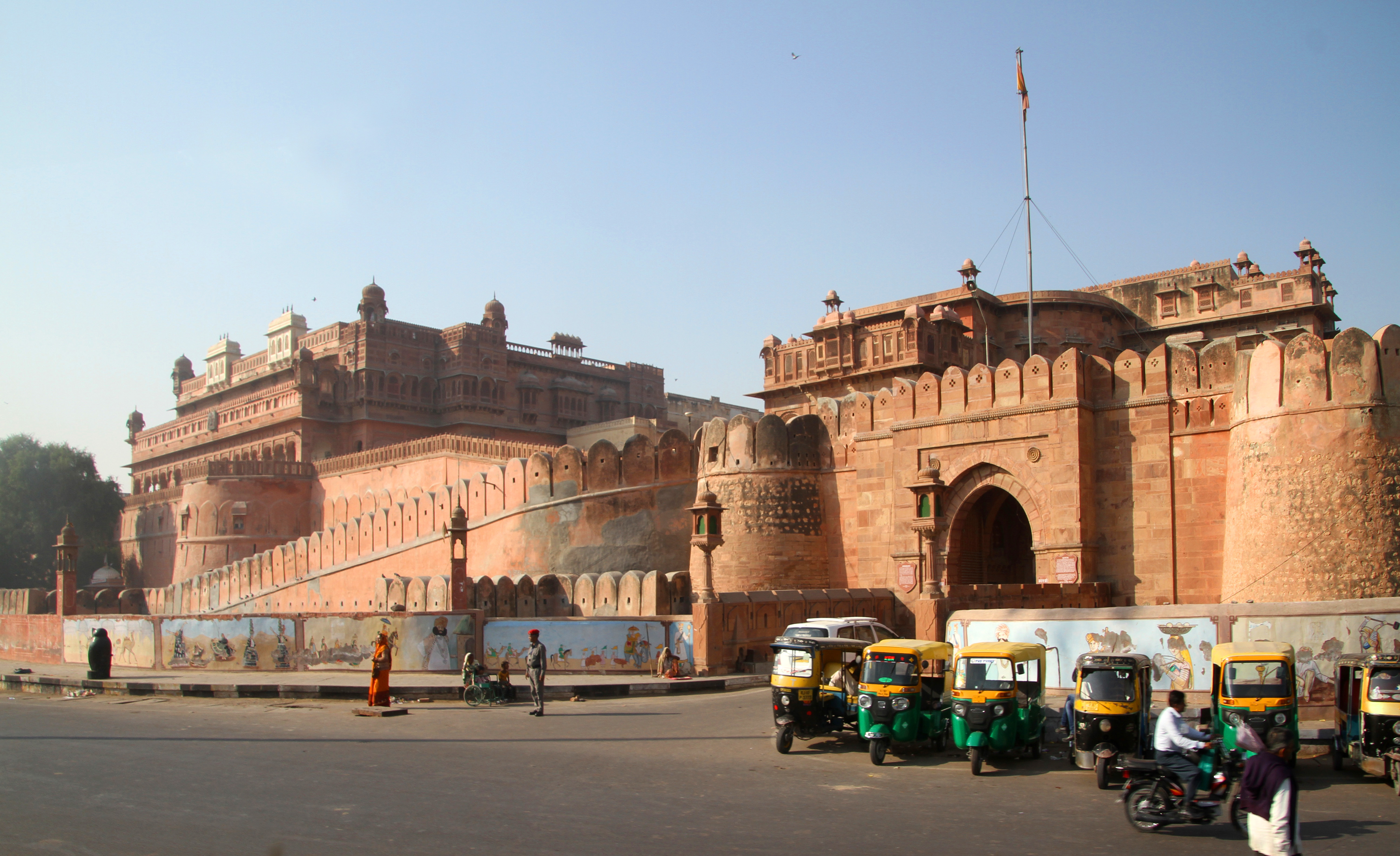
Junagarh Fort was constructed during his reign

Rai was among the highest ranked Hindu nobles of the Mughal court. His reign is regarded as a turning point in the history of Bikaner. Revenues from the fiefs granted to the Rai, as well as war exploits made the state wealthy. The capital grew into an opulent town, and several important buildings were commissioned. These include the Junagarh Fort. Exploits from the campaigns, including idols from Gujarat and Sirohi, as well as miniature paintings collected by Rai, were brought back to Bikaner. During his reign, a rudimentary school of painting developed which evolved into the Bikaner school.

== Bibliography ==
- Sehgal, K. K. (1962). Rajasthan District Gazetteers: Bikaner. Jaipur: Bharat Printers.
- Powlett, P. W. (1874). Gazetteer of The Bikaner State.
- Goetz, Herman (1950). Art and Architecture of Bikaner State. Bruno Cassirer.
