= Jitendra Jatashankar Rawal =

Indian astronomer

Jitendra Jatashankar Rawal (born 30 March 1943) is an Indian astrophysicist and scientific educator, recognized for his significant contributions to the popularization of science and his research in astrophysics.

== Early life and education ==
Born in Halvad, Morbi district, Gujarat, into a Gujarati family, Rawal pursued his academic interests in the physical sciences. He earned a Master of Philosophy (M.Phil) degree from the University of Calcutta in 1975. He later obtained a Doctor of Philosophy (PhD) in astrophysics from the University of Mumbai in 1992, with a thesis titled "Some Problems in the Solar System & in the Local Group of Galaxies."

In addition to his research and planetarium directorship, Rawal has been actively involved in the Children's Science Congress, an initiative aimed at fostering scientific curiosity and learning among schoolchildren across various Indian states. His work in this area has been instrumental in inspiring young students to pursue interests in science and astronomy.

== Career ==
He served as the Director of the Nehru Planetarium in Mumbai, where he played a pivotal role in developing public engagement with astronomy. Rawal has authored approximately 25 research papers published in national and international scientific journals. He is also the founding president of The Indian Planetary Society, an organization dedicated to promoting interest and education in planetary sciences.

== Works ==
Rawal is the author of many scientific and popular science works in the field of astronomy and related subjects, as follows:

- Solar System Parts I - IV (all in Gujarati)
- Total Solar Eclipse (English & Gujarati)
- Science in India after Independence (Gujarati).
- The Story of Birth of the Planetarium (Gujarati).
- The Wonderful Sky (Gujarati).
- Scientist of the millennium (English / Hindi)

He has written eight science fiction stories in Gujarati and Hindi, which appeared originally in Janmbhoomi-Pravasi, New Surat Times, Sambhav, Mumbai Samachar and Nav Bharat Times. They have been translated into English and Marathi, as well.

He also wrote the scripts of the following planetarium shows, shown at the Nehru Planetarium:

- Journey to the Red Planet
- Astronomy of the Millennium
- Einstein and the Universe
- Collision in Space

Dr. J.J. Rawal of the Nehru Planetarium, Bombay, recorded the distance of four satellites, each 35520 km, 57710 km, 96130 km and 71300 km, away from the centre of Neptune.

- Our place in the universe (for the Indian Planetary Society only)

== Awards ==
Rawal has received various awards, including:

- Science Journalist Late. Shri Manubhai Mehta Award for Popularization of Science.
- Yogiji Maharaj Centenary Celebration Award for contribution to Science.
- Felicitated by Mayor of Mumbai.
- Marathi Vigyan Parishad's Smt. Manoramabai Apte Award for Popularization of Science in India.
- Felicitated by Marathi Vigyan Parishad and Marathi Vigyan Mahasangh for Scientific discoveries about rings around Planets.
- Received Award of National Council for Science and Technology Communication, Department of Science and Technology, Government of India for popularization of Science in the year 1994.
- Felicitated by Municipal Corporation of Rajkot and Saurashtra Education Foundation for Scientific activities in the Country.
- Felicitated by Amreli City towards contribution to Scientific activities.
- Received Best Science Column Writer award for the year 1998–99. Department of Information, Government of Gujarat
- Felicitated by University of Gowahati, Aassam for Scientific activities.
- Felicitated by Halvad City towards contribution to Scientific research.
- Received Award of Rotary Club of Bombay South, Rotary Club of Juhu. JC's in the field of Science.
- Felicitated by various organization for Scientific discoveries around the Planets and popularization of Science in the Country.
- Received Award from Amrita for Scientific discoveries. Amrita is a Cultural Organization which felicitates Scientists and artists of the Country.
- Awarded by Sardar Patel Jagruti Mandal in the field of Science in the Country.
- Received Award from Brihan Mumbai Gujarati Samaj in the field of Science.
- Felicitated by Panchwati education Society, Nasik.
- Received Award from Lion's Club in the field of Science.
- Felicitated by Government of Himachal Pradesh for Scientific activities in the Country.
- Felicitated by Zalawad Social Group towards in the field of Science.
- Felicitated by Jain Social Group towards contribution to Scientific research.
- Felicitated by Brahman Social Group for the Scientific discoveries.
- Felicitated by Halvad Yuvak Mandal and Zalawad Sattar Taluka Mandal for the Scientific discoveries.
- Felicitated by various Scientific and Cultural Organizations for the Scientific discoveries and popularization of Science in the Country.
- acknowledge as Resource Person to the pioneer Program IISSSA -India International Sarabhai Student Scientist Award patented and designed program by DASA India National - Science organization VO operated national and international level from its HO at AGARTALA TRIPURA under the National Chairmanship of Anjan Banik - reputed awarded science activist and Science communicator science educator.

== Research papers ==
The following theoretical predictions of Dr. J.J. Rawal have come true through observations by NASA's space probes Pioneer 11, Voyager 2, Hubble Space Telescope, Parker Soar Space probe and Earth-based observations by telescopes

[1] Outermost ring of Saturn and its new Satellites Observation by Pioneer spacecraft send by NASA when it flew past Saturn in September, 1976 Published paper: i. Modified Titius –Bode Empirical Relation, Bulletin of Astronomical Society of India, Vol. 6, pg.92-95, 1978 ii. Resonant Structures in the Solar System The Moon and the Planets 24, 407–414, 1989 iii. Contraction of Sub-Solar Nebula Earth, Moon and Planets 49, 265–274, 1989 iv. Sky & Telescope, December 1981p. 541 v. Planetary Distance Law and Resonance, J. Astrophys. Astr. 10, 257-259 (1989) vi. Further consideration of Contraction of Solar Nebula, Earth Moon and Planets, 34, 93–100, 1988

[2] Discovery of 20 more Satellites of Saturn Observation by Astronomers of Carneg Institute of Science in October, 2019 Published Papers: i. Modified Titius –Bode Empirical Relation, Bulletin of Astronomical Society of India, Vol. 6, pg.92-95, 1978 ii. Resonant Structures in the Solar System The Moon and the Planets 24, 407–414, 1989 iii. Contraction of Sub-Solar Nebula Earth, Moon and Planets 49, 265–274, 1989 iv. Sky & Telescope, December 1981p. 541 v. Planetary Distance Law and Resonance, J. Astrophys. Astr. 10, 257-259 (1989) vi. Further consideration of Contraction of Solar Nebula, Earth Moon and Planets, 34, 93–100, 1988

[3] Rings Around Galaxies Observation: New Surveys have unveiled a thick ring of hundreds of millions of stars around the outskirts of our Milky Way Report of Robert Irion Jan 6, 2003; Science, 3, January, p 62 Astronomers at the Sloan Digital Sky survey (SDSS) Apache Point Observatory in Sunspot, New Mexico Independently, European and Australian astronomers at the Roque de Los Muchqchas Observatory in La Palma, Canari Islands, spotted the Taurus in two other directions, strengthening the suspicion that it girdles the galaxy, Published papers: i. Is There a Ring Around Milky Way? Indian Journal of Radio & Space Physics, Vol.11, pp. 100–101, June 1982

[4] Are There Rings Around the Sun? Observations: Parker Solar Probe NASA's Solar Probe found Tantalizing Evidence of Rings Around the Sun by Becky Ferreira 5 December 2019 The parker Solar Probe captured evidence of a passible dust-free zone, hinting at rings, along with insights into “magnetic islands” and plasma “blobs” These weird solar features are described in one of four new papers published in Nature on Wednesday, based on dispatches from a record- breaking NASA space craft called the Parker Solar Probe. Published Papers: i. Resonant Structures in the Solar System The Moon and the Planets, 24, (1981), 407-414 ii. Contraction of the Solar Nebula Earth, Moon and Planets 31 (1984), 175-182 iii. Are There Rings Around Earth, Moon and Planets (2012) 108, 95-99 iv. Planetary Distance Law and Resonance J. Astrophys Astr. 10, 257-259(1989) v. Modified Titius –Bode Empirical Relation Bulletin Astronomical Society of India 6, 92–95, 1978 vi. Further considerations of Contraction of Solar Nebula Earth, Moon and Planets 34, 93–100, 1986 vii. News Notes Sky & Telescope December 1981 p. 541 viii. Formation of the Solar System Astrophysics and Space Science 119, 159, 166 (1986)

[5] Outermost Ring Around Uranus and its new Satellites Observations: Voyager 2 Space craft send by NASA when it flew past Uranus in January 1986 Paper Published: i. Sky and Telescope, December 1981, p 541 ii. Modified Titius-Bode Empirical Relation Bulletin of Astronomical Society of India, 6, 92–95, 1978 iii. Contractions of Sub-Solar Nebula, Earth, Moon and Planets 44, 265–274, 1989 iv. Planetary Distance Law and Resonance J. Astrophys Astr. 10, 257-259(1989) v. Further considerations of Contraction of Solar Nebula Earth, Moon and Planets 34, 93–100, 1986 vi. Formation of the Solar System Astrophysics and Space Science, 119, 159-166 (1986)

[6] Rings Around Neptune and its new Satellites. Observations: Voyager 2 space craft sent by NASA which flew past Neptune in September 1989 Paper Published: i. News Notes Sky & Telescope December 1981 p. 541 ii. Resonant Structures in the Solar System The Moon and the Planets, 24, (1981), 407-414 iii. Contractions of Sub-Solar Nebula, Earth, Moon and Planets 44, 265–274, 1989 iv. Planetary Distance Law and Resonance J. Astrophys Astr. 10, 257-259(1989) v. Further considerations of Contraction of Solar Nebula Earth, Moon and Planets 34, 93–100, 1986 vi. Modified Titius-Bode Empirical Relation Bulle of Astro. Soc. of India 6, 92 – 95, (1978) vii. Formation of the Solar System Astrophysics and Space Science 119, 159–166, (1986)

[7] 14th Satellite of Neptune Observations: Hubble Space Telescope Discovery by team of astronomers of such for Extraterrestrial Intelligence Institute at Mount View California headed by Dr. Mark Solasters in March, 2019 Paper Published: i. News Notes Sky & Telescope December 1981 p. 541 ii. Resonant Structures in the Solar System The Moon and the Planets, 24, (1981), 407-414 iii. Contractions of Sub-Solar Nebula, Earth, Moon and Planets 44, 265–274, 1989 iv. Planetary Distance Law and Resonance J. Astrophys Astr. 10, 257-259(1989) v. Further considerations of Contraction of Solar Nebula Earth, Moon and Planets 34, 93–100, 1986 vi. Modified Titius-Bode Empirical Relation Bulle of Astro. Soc. of India 6, 92 – 95, (1978) vii. Formation of the Solar System Astrophysics and Space Science 119, 159–166, (1986)

[8] Plunge of a comet into Jupiter, July 1994 Observations by Galileo Space craft and Hubble Space Telescope Paper Published: A Hypothesis on the Oort Clouds of Planets Earth, Moon and Planets 54, 89-102 (1991)

[9] Disruption of Phobos - a satellite of Mars Paper Published by UC Berkeley team Benjamin Black and Tushar Mittal, 2015 Paper Published by J.J. Rawal: i. Resonant Structures in the Solar System The Moon and Planets 24, 407-414 (1981) ii. Contractions of Sub-Solar Nebula Earth, Moon and Planets 44, 265–274, (1989)

[10] Four Satellites of Pluto Observation by Hubble Space Telescope Paper Published: Are there rings around Pluto? IJFPS, 1, pp 6–10, 2011

[11] Satellites of Jovian System Observed by Voyager 1 and 2 Paper Published: i. Modified Titius-Bode Empirical Relation Bull. Astr. Soc. India, 6,92-95, (1978) ii. Contractions of Sub-Solar Nebula Earth, Moon and Planets 44, 265-274 (1989)

[12] Three New Asteroidal Belts between Mars and Jupiter in addition to one already in existence. Observed by Low et al. (1984) have reported the findings of IRAS of three more asteroidal belts at distances 2.2, 2.3 and 3.2 AU in addition to the already existing one in asteroidal belt at a mean distance 2.8 AU Paper Published: i. Contraction of the Solar Nebula Earth, Moon and Planets 31, 175-182 (1984) ii. Sky & Telescope, December 1981, p. 541 iii. Further Considerations of Contraction of Solar Nebula Earth, Moon and Planet, 34, 93-100 (1986) iv. Planetary Distance Law and Resonance J. Astrophys. Astr. 10, 257-259 (1989)

[13] 10th Planet Beyond Pluto Observed by Jewitt and Luu 1992 QBI moving beyond the orbit of Neptune on August 30, 1992, using a 2.2 meter telescope and sophisticated Charge Coupled Device (CCD) Camera on Mouna Kea Hawaii Paper Published: i. Modified Titius-Bode Empirical Relation Bull. Astron. Soc India 6, 92-95 (1978) ii. Contraction of Solar Nebula Earth, Moon and Planets 31, 175-182 (1984).

[14] 11th Planet Beyond Pluto Observed by NASA Scientists in 2005. Paper Published: i. Contraction of the Solar Nebula Earth, Moon and Planets 31, 175-182 (1984) ii. Sky & Telescope, December 1981, p. 541 iii. Further Considerations of Contraction of Solar Nebula Earth, Moon and Planet, 34, 93-100 (1986) iv. Planetary Distance Law and Resonance J. Astrophys. Astr. 10, 257-259 (1989)

[15] Tides in the Solar System showing volcanic Activities on Triton, IO Observed by Voyager 2 (1989) Paper was submitted to Bull. Astr. Soc. India in 1986 it was rejected but in 1898 it came true.

[16] Rawal's theory of Contraction of Solar Nebula provided theoretical support for existence of Chiron small planet between Saturn and Uranus discovered by Charles T. Kowal in 1977.
