= Harisinhji Jaisinhji =

- His Highness the Thakore Sahib of Dhrol
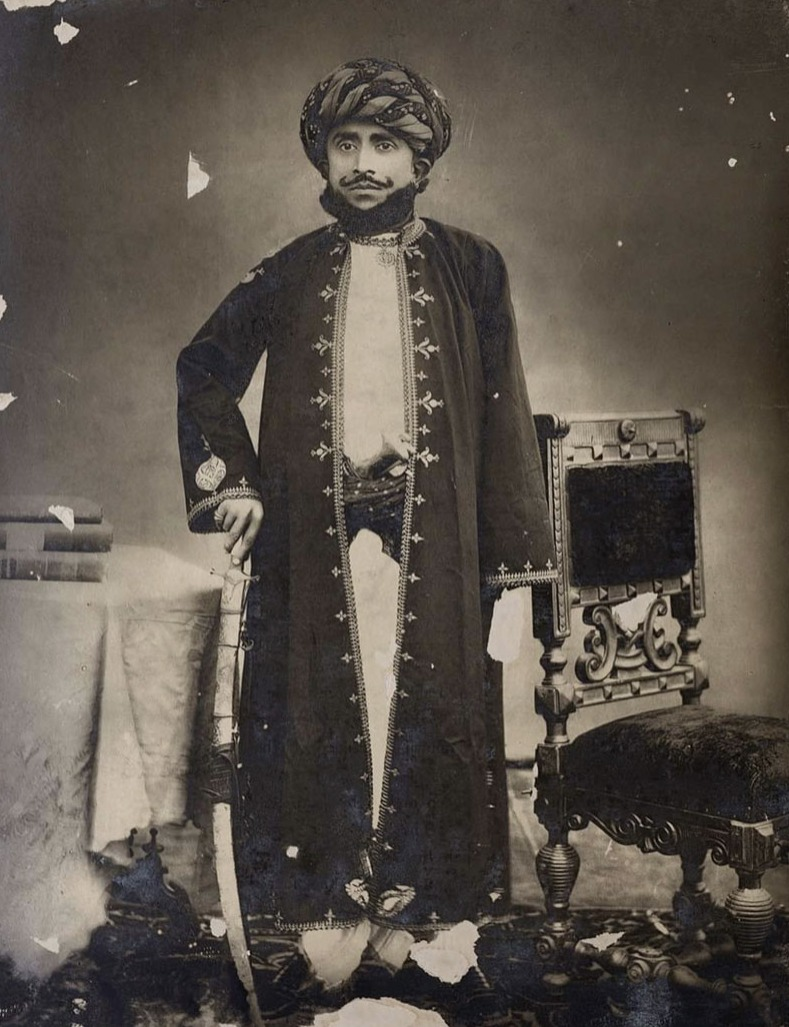

Thakore of Dhrol
- Reign: 1886-1914
- Investiture: 26 October 1886
- Predecessor: Jaisinhji Bhupatsinhji
- Successor: Dolatsinhji Harisinhji
- Born: 1845
- Died: 1914 (aged 68–69)
- Issue: Dolatsinhji Harisinhji; Samatsinhji Harisinhji
- Father: Jaisinhji Bhupatsinhji

Harisinhji Jaisinhji was the Thakore of Dhrol from 1886 until 1914.

== Biography ==
He was born in 1845, and succeeded his father, Jaisinhji, on 26 October 1886. He was educated at Rajkumar College in Rajkot. He was kind-hearted and generous ruler. He had erected many public buildings including the Victoria Dispensary, the Prichard Girls’ School, a clock tower and a few temples. He died on 31 July 1914.

=== Children ===
Harisinhji was the father of two sons. They were:

1. Dolatsinhji Harisinhji
2. Samatsinhji Harisinhji
