= Khirasra state =

The State of Khirasra
- Princely State of British India
- 1712–1948
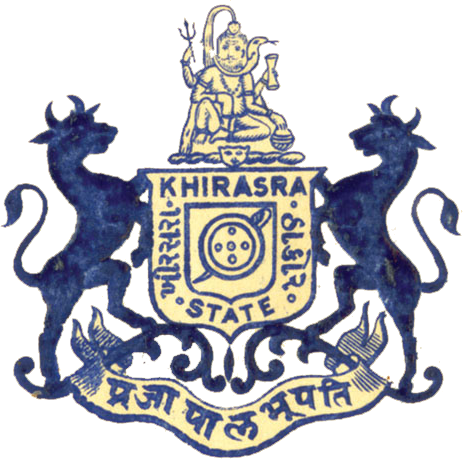
- Coat of arms

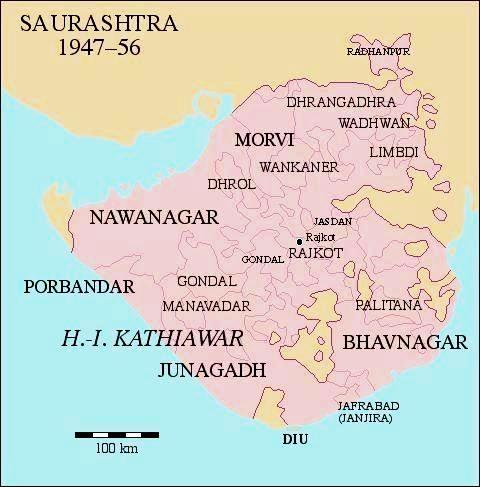
- Area
- 34 km^{2} (13 sq mi)
- Population
- 4,377 (1,881)
- 3,659 (1,921)
- History
  - Established: 1712
  - Indian independence: 15 April 1948
Preceded by	Succeeded by
Dhrol State	India
- Today part of: Saurashtra, India

Khirasra state was one of the princely states of British India. It was an offshoot of the Dhrol state.

It consisted of 13 villages, covering an area of 34 km and a population of 3,659 (1921). It had a supposed revenue of 1900 pounds.

== History ==
Khirasra was founded by a scion of the Dhrol state. The rulers of Khirasra were from the Jadeja clan of the Rajput Kshatriya. They bore the title of Thakur. Khirasra Palace was built by Thakur Ranmalji, a mighty ruler of Khirasra. Mohammad Mahabat Khanji I, the Nawab of Junagadh, attacked Khirasra twice but was repelled by the strategy and bravery of Thakur Ranmalji. Once Meraman Khawas of Jamnagar also attacked Khirasra, but was defeated.

In 188, the ruler of Khirasra (probably Dungarji Hathiji) was demoted from the fourth class to the seventh class in the table of precedence, as a punishment for not maintaining order in his state.

The last ruler, Thakur Sursinhji made efforts to revive the Khirasra Palace. He improved the conditions of farmers, which led to an increase in the production. He also established agencies for benefit of his subjects. He introduced Khirasra to India's post-independence development and progress. He signed the accession to the Union of India on 15 April 1948. After the abolition of the monarchy, the royal family members of Khirsra received a privy purse of rupees 30,000, until the abolition of all royal titles, privileges and privy purses in 1972.

== List of rulers ==
This is the list of the rulers of Khirasra-

- Bhimji Kaloji (first ruler)
- Sangaji Bhimji
- Ranmalji Sangaji
- Hathiji Ranmalji (c.1808)
- Dungarji Hathiji
- Jijibhai Dungarji (?- 1872)
- Raisinhji Jijibhai (1 Jan 1872-?) He was born in 1850 and died because of Atrial fibrillation in 1891.
- Balsinhji Raisinhji (?- 1920)
- Sursinhji Balsinhji (24 Feb 1920 - 1947) Born in 1890. He was the last ruler of Khirasra, and signed the accession to the Union of India on 15 April 1948.

The current titular head of Khirasra is Thakur Shri Prabatsinhji Sursinhji. He is the tenth Thakur Shri of Khirasra, born on 7 September 1918.

== See also ==
- Nawanagar State
- Dhrol State
- Jadeja
