= Deviyan =

16th/17th century text by Mahatma Isardas

Deviyan is a 16th/17th century text written by Mahatma Isardas. It is a Shaktism centred text and is recited daily in parts of Rajasthan and Gujarat. Isardas praises the great goddess Devi or Shakti as the supreme deity. He describes Mahadevi's various manifestations such as Durga, Kali, Parvati, Chamunda, Ashapura, Lakshmi, Saraswati and Hinglaj. The poet compares this text to the sacred Devi Mahatmya and claims to be blessed by Rukmini. It is written in Chhand Adal and Bhujangi.
