= Muli State =

Former Hindu Kingdom

Coordinates: 22°38′N 71°30′E

- 1470–1950
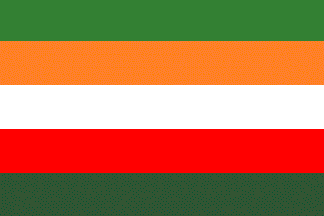
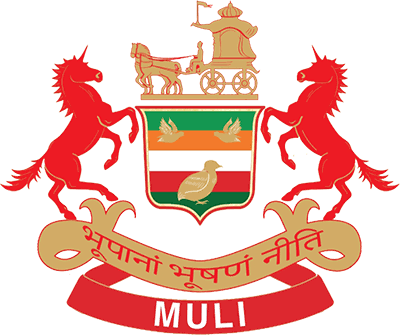
- Flag Coat of arms
- Capital: Muli
- History
  - Established: 1470
  - Accession to the Union of India: 1950

Area
- 1901: 344 km^{2} (133 sq mi)

Population
  - 1901: 16,390
Succeeded by
1943: Dhrangadhra State; 1947: India
- Today part of: India

Muli State was a princely state in subsidiary alliance with British India. It was ruled by the Parmar clan of the Rajputs.

The state was originally ruled by Sodha branch of the Parmar Rajputs which was founded in 1470s. It subsequently remained under the suzerainty of bigger states. It became a princely state during the rule of Britishers in the subcontinent.

After Indian independence in 1947, the rulers of Muli acceded to the Union of India.

== History ==
The rulers of Muli belonged to the Sodha dynasty, which is originally a branch of Paramara dynasty. They came from Tharparkar and carved out an Independent state for themselves under the leadership of Lakhdhirji and settled in Thān and Chotila. They are said to have started out as feudatories of the Vaghela dynasty.

The Muli is famous for a battle over a wounded partridge. Stone Memorials at Muli commemorate the event when two communities fought over a partridge leading to the death of an estimated 200 persons. The incident goes back to 1474, when members of the Chabad community, who were tribal hunters shot a partridge, which was wounded and saved by a lady named Jombai who was the mother of Lakhdhirji, the then ruler of the Muli State. She found the injured bird lying behind the presiding deity of their community, and hence refused to hand over the bird. The ensuring battle led to many deaths and stone memorials are still found in Muli. The caste identity of each of those killed in inscribed in the memorials. Since then, Parmar Rajputs of Muli vowed never to kill a partridge.

== Rulers ==
The rulers of Muli used the title Thakore Saheb.

- Laghdhirsinhji I – 1st HH Thakore Saheb of Muli
- Ramasinhji (Ramaji) I – 2nd HH Thakore Saheb of Muli
- Bhojrajsinhji (Bhojaji) I – 3rd HH Thakore Saheb of Muli
- Samantsinhji – 4th HH Thakore Saheb of Muli
- Laghdhirsinhji ll - 5th HH Thakore Saheb of muli
- Bhojrajsinhji II (Bhojaji) – 6th HH Thakore Saheb of Muli
- Chachoji (Sesaji) – 7th HH Thakore Saheb of Muli
- Ratansinhji II – 8th HH Thakore Saheb of Muli
- Karansinhji – 9th HH Thakore Saheb of Muli
- Jagdevsinhji – 10th HH Thakore Saheb of Muli
- Ramasinhji III – 11th HH Thakore Saheb of Muli
- Raisinhji – 12th HH Thakore Saheb of Muli
- Ratansinhji III – 13th HH Thakore Saheb of Muli
- Kalyansinhji I – 14th HH Thakore Saheb of Muli
- Munjaji III – 15th HH Thakore Saheb of Muli
- Ratansinhji IV – 16th HH Thakore Saheb of Muli
- Kalyansinhji II – 17th HH Thakore Saheb of Muli
- Ramasinhji – 18th HH Thakore Saheb of Muli
- Vakhatsinhji – 19th HH Thakore Saheb of Muli
- Sartansinhji Rambhai – 20th HH Thakore Saheb of Muli
- Himmatsinhji Sartansinhji – 21st HH Thakore Saheb of Muli
- Harischandrasinhji Dharmendrasinhji – 22nd HH Thakore Saheb of Muli
- Dharmendrasinhji Harischandrasinhji – 23rd HH Thakore Saheb of Muli
- Jitendrasinhji Dharmendrasinhji – 24th HH Thakore Saheb of Muli. Yuvraj Saheb Ranjitsinhji is the current heir to the throne of Muli.
