= Tikar, Gujarat =

Tikar
- village
- Location in Gujarat, India Tikar (India)
- Coordinates: 23°9′0″N 71°6′0″E
- Country: India
- State: Gujarat
- District: Morbi

Government
  - Body: Panchayat
- Elevation: 20 m (66 ft)

Population
  - Total: 9,000

Languages
  - Official: Gujarati, Hindi
- Time zone: UTC+5:30 (IST)
- Vehicle registration: GJ36-
- Website: gujaratindia.com

Tikar is a village in Halvad taluk of Morbi district in the state of Gujarat, India.

== Geography ==
Tikar is located at 23°9′0″N 71°6′0″E at an elevation of 20 m above nearest city is Morbi around 50km and Surendranagar around 90km. The nearest railway station is Halvad, nearest airport is Sardar Vallabhbhai Patel International Airport, Ahmedabad MSL and Rajkot Airport.

Top attractions are Little Rann of Kutch, Wildlife sanctuary of Wild Ass.
