= Tikar, Rajasthan =

Tikar
- village
- Location in Rajasthan, India Tikar (India)
- Coordinates: 25°43′0″N 75°25′0″E
- Country: India
- State: Rajasthan
- District: Bhilwara
- Elevation: 351 m (1,152 ft)

Languages
  - Official: Hindi
- Time zone: UTC+5:30 (IST)
- ISO 3166 code: RJ-IN
- Vehicle registration: RJ-

Tikar is a village in Bhilwara district in the state of Rajasthan, India. It is located at 25°43′0″N 75°25′0″E at an elevation of 351 m above MSL.
