= Mandal, Gujarat =

Mandal
- Town
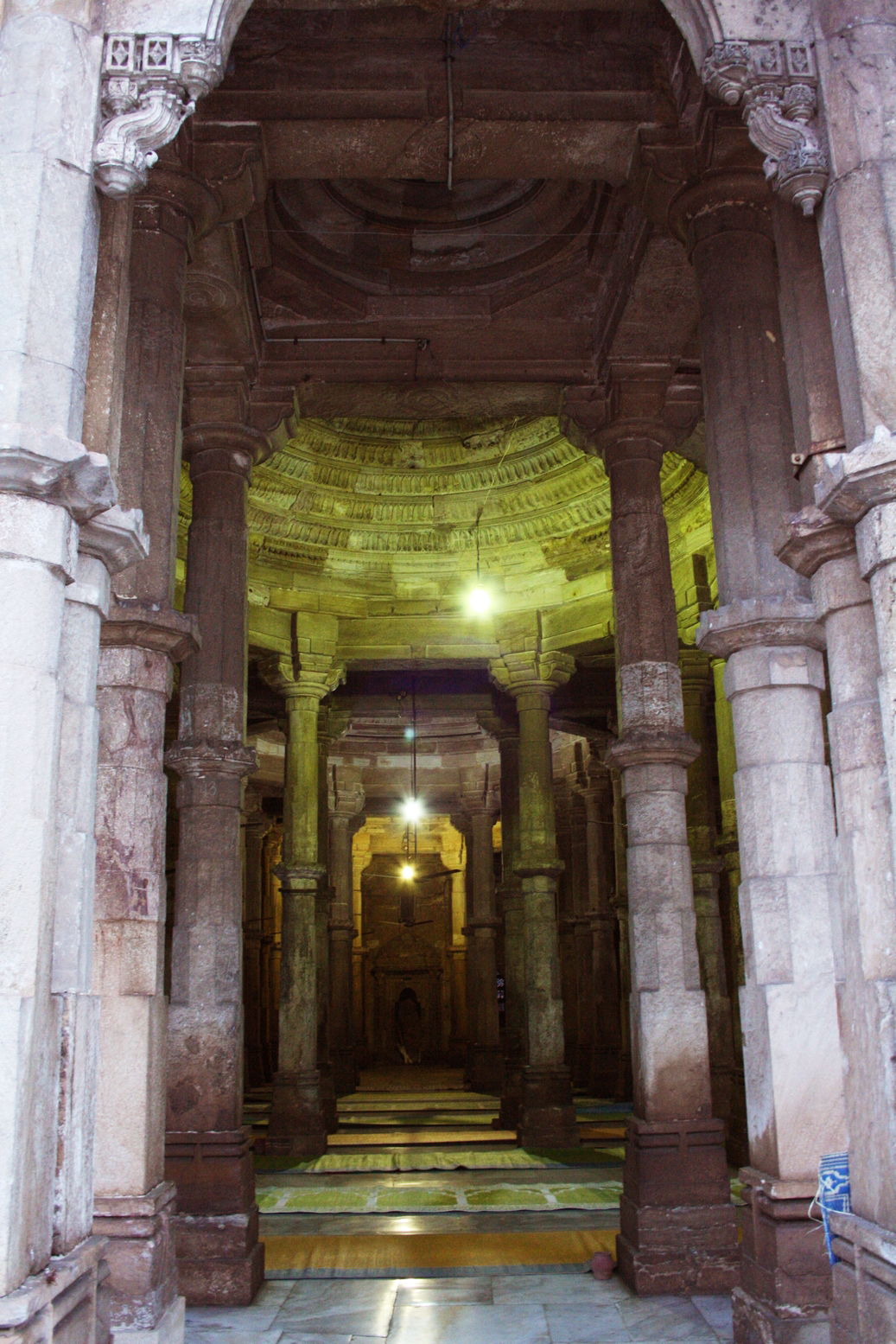
- Jami mosque in Mandal
- Interactive map of Mandal
- Coordinates: 23.28865°N 71.91854°E
- Country: India
- State: Gujarat
- District: Ahmedabad

Languages
  - Official: Gujarati, Hindi
- Time zone: UTC+5:30 (IST)
- Telephone code: +91-079
- Vehicle registration: GJ
- Lok Sabha constituency: Ahmedabad
- Website: gujaratindia.com

Mandal is a town in Mandal taluka of Ahmedabad district, India.

== History ==
Mandal is a historical town. When, in 1347, the Emperor Muhammad bin Tughluq came to establish his rule in Gujarat, the Rana of Mandal and Patri, helped him and was honoured with robes and rewards. In 1395, Mandal was besieged by Muzaffar Shah I who founded Gujarat Sultanate later. The siege would have failed if it had not a pestilence broke out among the defenders. A few years later Jhala Satarsalji of Mandal was one of the chiefs who joined in the revolt against Sultan Ahmad Shah I (1414). It was not until 1530, the Mandal estates were made a part of the crown domains. In 1741, the town was restored and fortified by a brother of the Desai of Viramgam. In the latter part of the century it remained under the Marathas till its transfer in 1817 to the British East India Company. Some small stone mosques and some temples are the only remains of its former importance.

== Places of interest ==
Jami mosque, Kazi mosque and Saiyyad mosque in Mandal are designated the Monuments of National Importance of India.

Ganj-e-Shuhada Mazar is a burial place of Muslim soldiers died during the battle in Gujarat Sultanate period.

== Climate ==
Mandal

Climate chart (precipitation, max. and min. temperature)
J	F	M	A	M	J	J	A	S	O	N	D
2 32 13	1 37 16	1 45 20	19 48 25	2 42 29	50 35 25	366 26 20	144 28 21	282 34 24	17 41 22	1 37 17	1 32 16
- █ Average max. and min. temperatures in °C
- █ Precipitation totals in mm
- Source: NASA Earth Observation Data Index
Imperial conversion
J	F	M	A	M	J	J	A	S	O	N	D
0.1 90 55	0 99 61	0 113 68	0.7 118 77	0.1 108 84	2 95 77	14 79 68	5.7 82 70	11 93 75	0.7 106 72	0 99 63	0 90 61
- █ Average max. and min. temperatures in °F
- █ Precipitation totals in inches
