= Patdi =

- town
- Location in Gujarat, India Patdi (India)
- Coordinates: 23.19°N 71.80°E
- Country: India
- State: Gujarat
- District: Surendranagar

Government
  - Type: Municipality (C Level)

Population
  - Total: 30,000

Languages
  - Official: Gujarati, Hindi
- Time zone: UTCNew Delhi GMT +5:30 (IST)
- PIN: 363765
- Telephone code: 363765
- Vehicle registration: GJ13
- Nearest city: Surendranagar
- Literacy: 40%

Patdi is a municipality in Dasada Taluka, Surendranagar District in Gujarat state. It is the headquarters of Dasada Taluka.

== History ==
Patdi used to be an estate in prant of Eastern Kathiawar. Paadshah Baadshaah Jahangir Had given ' Desai ' To Kadva Paatidaar Rulers. Which used to be came in Jhalawar State.

== Ruling Desai Patel Shris ==
- .... - .... Bhamjibhai
- .... - .... Udekaramji
- .... - .... Bhavsimhji
- .... - 1796 Nathubhai
- 1796 - 1809 Vakhatsimji Nathubhai
- 1809 - .... Harisimhji
- .... - .... Arbhamji Harisimhji
- .... - .... Kubersimji Vakhatsimhji
- 1848 - 1875 Jorawarsimhji
- 1875 - 1884 Himmatshimji Jorawarsimhji
- 10 July 1884 - 5 August 1913 Surajmalji Jorawarsimhji (b. 1848 - d. 1913)
- 5 August 1913 – 25 Oct 1928 Daulatsimhji Surajmalji (b. 1881 - d. 1928)
- 25 Oct 1928 – 2 Jan 1940 Raghuvirsimhji Daulatsimhji (b. 1926 - d. 1940)
- 2 Jan 1940 – 17 Dec 1941 Naransimhji Chandrasimhji (b. 1873 - d. 1941)
- 17 Dec 1941 - 15 August 1947 Pratapsimhji Naransimhji (b. 1895 - d. 1978)

Jahangir gives name ' desai ' to patdi rulers...

== Economy ==
The main business of Patdi is salt production and related products. It provides a salt transportation channel to India. Patdi provides the best market for the consumer needs of neighbouring villages. It also provides a farmers' market and cotton processing units.

== Transport ==
The town is located 90 km west of Ahmedabad in Ahmedabad district with a population of approximately 20,000. Ahmedabad International Airport is the nearest airport, located 90 km away. Patdi has a lesser frequency of train connections. The nearest station having enough trains is Viramgam (30 km).

Patdi town is on the edge of Little Rann of Kachchh, the inner fort of Patdi, which is secured by dip water and city suburbs. Patdi is also known for its Surajmalji highschool.

Transportation of Bulk Trucks are from Rajasthan, Madhyapradesh.

== Climate ==
Due to the neighbouring "Desert", the climate is dry but not much different from other parts of Gujarat.
