= Halvad =

- Town
- Location in Gujarat, India Halvad (India)
- Coordinates: 23.02°N 71.18°E
- Country: India
- State: Gujarat
- District: Morbi
- Elevation: 46 m (151 ft)

Population (2011)
  - Total: 61,247

Languages
  - Official: Gujarati, Hindi
- Time zone: UTC+5:30 (IST)
- Vehicle registration: GJ 36

Halvad is a town and a municipality in Morbi district in the Gujarat state of India.

== Geography ==
Halvad is located at 23.02°N 71.18°E. It has an average elevation of 46 metres (150 feet). Halvad sits on the banks of the Samatsar Pond.

Ek-Dandia Mahal(Halvad Palace)

Halvad was a former capital of the Dhrangadhra State and was ruled by the Jhala Rajputs. It is an ancient fortified town at the southern edge of the Little Rann of Kutch. The yellow earth of this semi-arid area and the buildings of local yellow sandstone make the whole town glow vibrant golden yellow during sunrise.

Halvad is close to the Indian Wild Ass Sanctuary at the Little Rann of Kutch. The Asiatic wild ass is a member of the horse family with striking white underparts and a deep mane. It is a strong and powerful runner. Other animals spotted here are nilgai and chinkara and the birds seen are the Indian sandgrouse, houbara bustard, lark, desert warbler, desert wheatear, Indian courser and vultures.

== Culture and Points of interest ==
Halvad is protected by a temple of Shiva in all the directions. Halvad is also, called the Chota (small) Kashi of India.
Names of temples around Halvad:

- Sharaneshwer - Shiva temple located near Samantsit talab,
- Bhavanibhuteshwar
- Gaulokeshwar
- Shabaleshwar
- Kashivishwanath
- Dholeshwar
- Vaijnath
- Jageshwar
- Naklank Guru Dham, shaktinagar
- Shree SundariBhavani Temple
- Shree ButBhavani Temple Jethvadhar
- Shree ButBhavani Maa, Balad Maa, Bahuchar Maa, and Balvi Maa Birth temple Sapakda

Chatris (15th-century structures) resemble the architecture of the smaller temple structures of Gujarat, with carved columns, high plinths and cobbled roofs in pyramidal shape. The vast arid landscape, dotted with chatris, makes a picturesque setting.

At the edge of town, on the banks of the Samatsar lake, stands the finest example of the wooden architecture of the Royal Palaces of Gujarat. Other similar examples of palaces on the lake-shore in India are the palaces of Udaipur, Alwar, Datia and Mandu. The Halvad Palace Campus has all the elements of Rajput palaces - a zenana, a hall for public audience, a temple to the family goddess, a pleasure garden and administrative offices. The entry to the Halvad Palace is from the town. A beautifully carved entrance gate leads one to a huge courtyard. The formal square plan of two storied palace structure, adorned with exquisitely carved wooden columns, brackets, friezes and jalis with geometric patterns defines the courtyard. Four raised pathways, from the center of each side, meet in the middle of the courtyard at the base of the seven storied, octagonal tower, with jharokhas overlooking all eight directions. From the top of this tower, on a clear day, one can see the surrounding villages; therefore, it is popularly known as Jhalawad Darshan or EK-Dandia Mahal. The long facade, with carved stone jharokhas, brings in the cool breeze as it overlooks the lake. The jharokhas were the favorite sit-outs of the royal ladies, while on full moon nights the terrace was used for private royal gatherings. Even today, one can see beautiful carved sit-outs of sandstone on the terrace. In short, the architecture of the palace is a perfect synthesis of two natural materials, stone and wood.

Halvad has four old step-wells and six Shiva temples encircling the town. The Bhavani Temple and the Bhuteshwar Mahadev at the cremation ground are at least 500 years old and are protected monuments. On the west bank of the Samatsar Lake, a famous pilgrim place of the Dawoodi Bohra community, the dargah of Maula Qazi, is located.

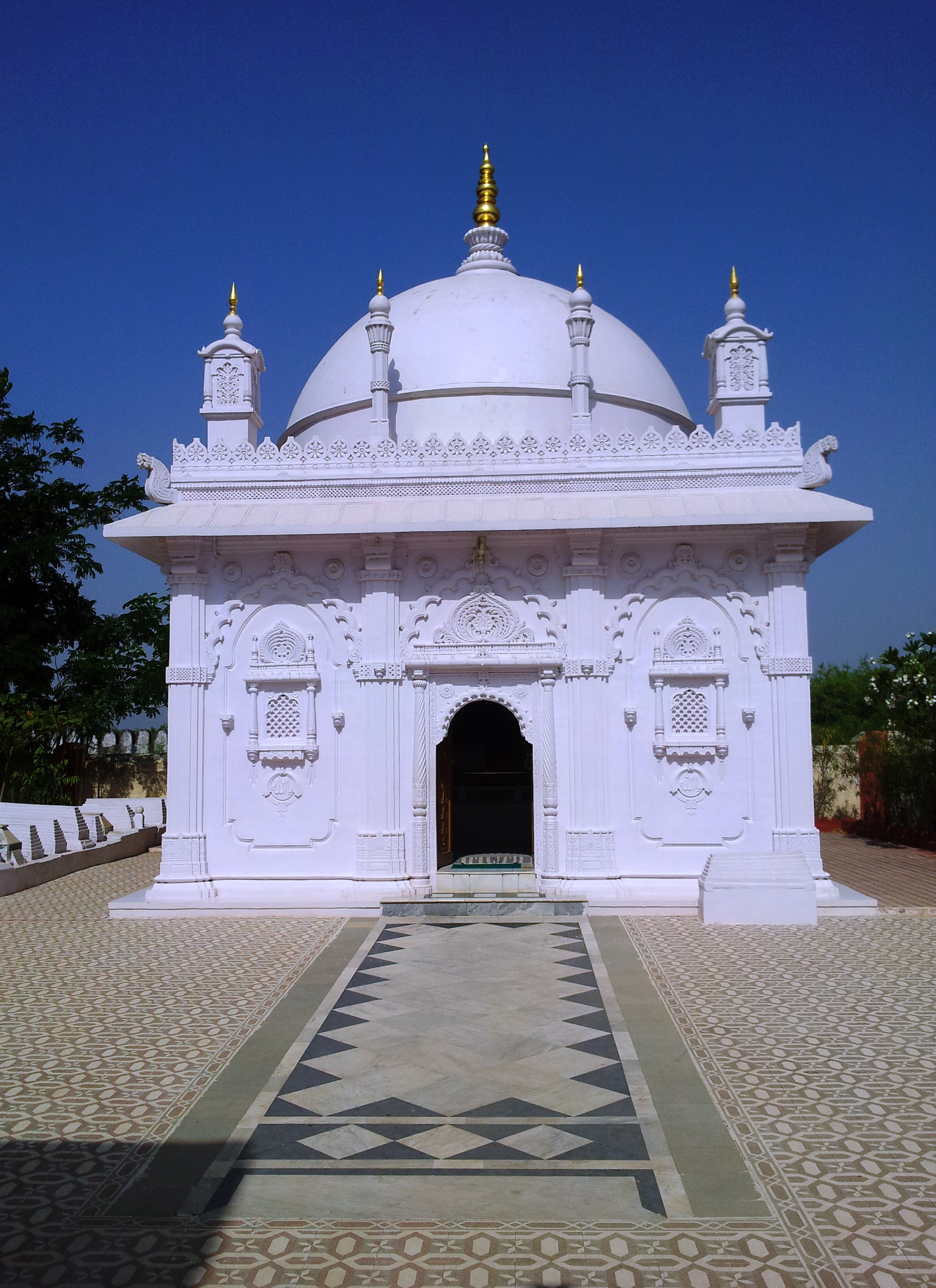
Dargah of Maula Qazi

Halvad is a village of Brahmins. Halvad is famous for gourmet Brahmins and heroic warriors, who fought against past invaders to protect their hometown. Today, one can see several cenotaphs and hero-stones built of sandstone at the edge of town. Paliyas (memorial stones) remind visitors of the bloody battles fought at the gates of Halvad. They evoke memories of women who committed sati to protect their honor and men who died fighting against enemies. Newly weds come here to perform the ritual of the untying of nuptial knots and pay homage to their ancestors. Even today, once a year, an unusual competition of Laddu eating is organised by the Brahmins of Halvad.

Modern day development of Halvad is because of the brahmin community. They brought a lot of changes in local farming methods.

== Demographics ==
As of 2011 India census, Halvad had a population of 32,024. Males constitute 51.96% of the population and females 48.04%. Halvad has an average literacy rate of 80.27%, higher than the national average of 72.98% and state average of 78.03%. Male literacy is 87.85% and female literacy is 72.78%. In Halvad, 12.54% of the population is under 6 years of age. Halvad's female sex ratio is 925 which is higher than state's average of 919. Today, Halvad has become an education hub of the north-east part of Saurashtra. Mother Palace is first raised residential building. Halvad is famous for high-tech agriculture. It has high production of cotton and is ranked among the top cotton producing regions of India. It also has some salt producing units. Nowadays, the Market Yard of Halvad has become one of the largest market yards of Saurashtra. It has developed in education just like Ahmedabad. It has a lot of influence of Brahmins. This is a very important town for politics and Hinduism. It has progressed in agriculture, with crops like cotton, groundnut, mustard, castor, onion, watermelon, muskmelon, pomegranate, papaya, kesar mango, garlic, millet, jowar, tobacco, etc. being cultivated on the outskirts of the town.

== See also ==
- Nava Ghantila
- J J Rawal
