= Dhrol State =

Princely state of India

Coordinates: 22°34′N 70°24′E

The State of Dhrol ધ્રોલ રિયાસત
- Princely State of British India
- 1595–1948
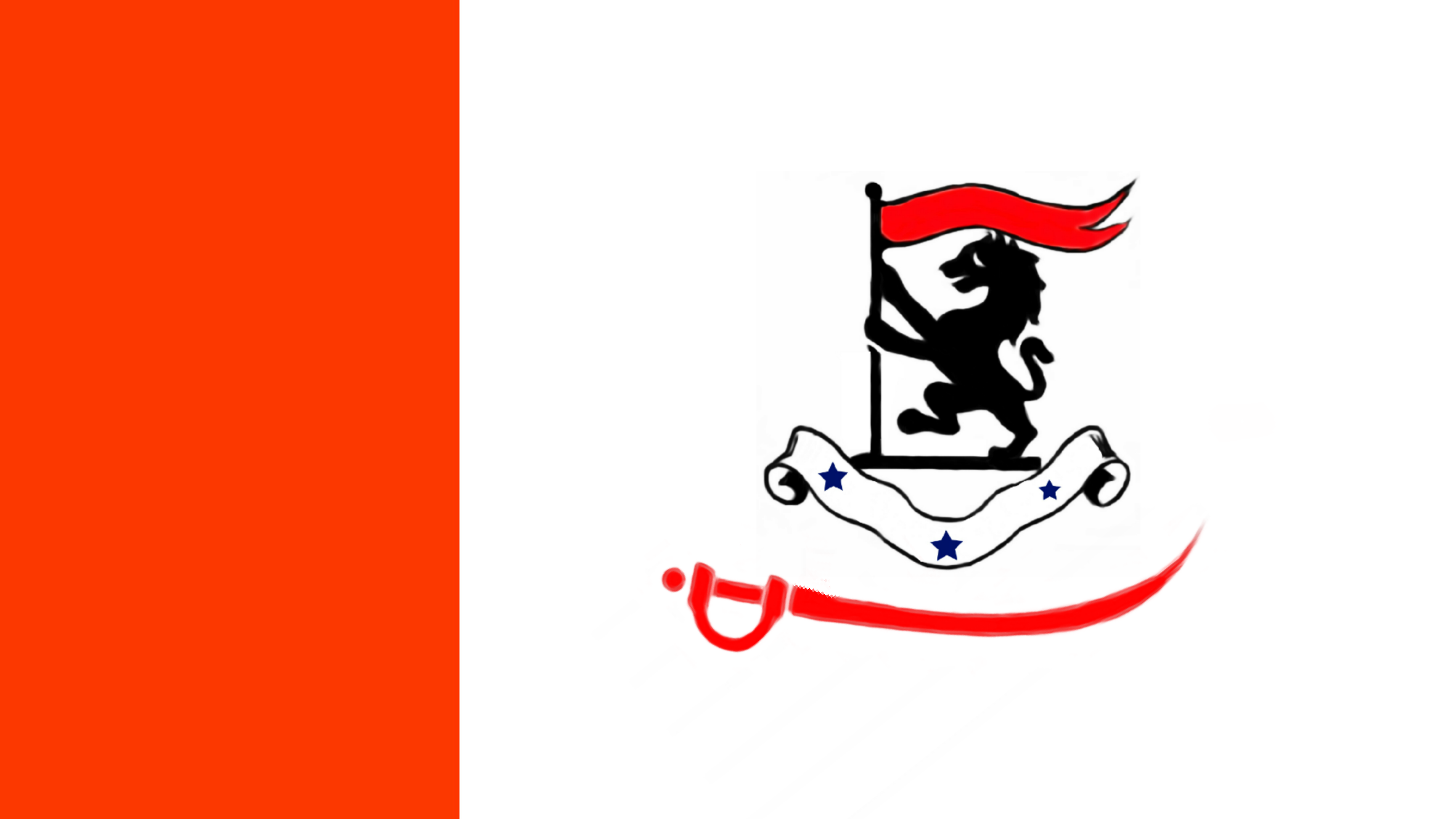
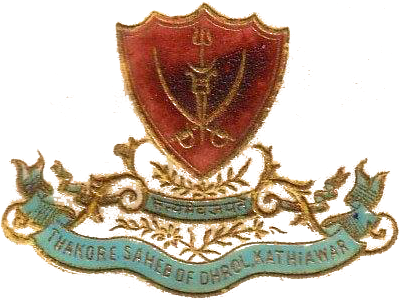
- Flag Coat of arms

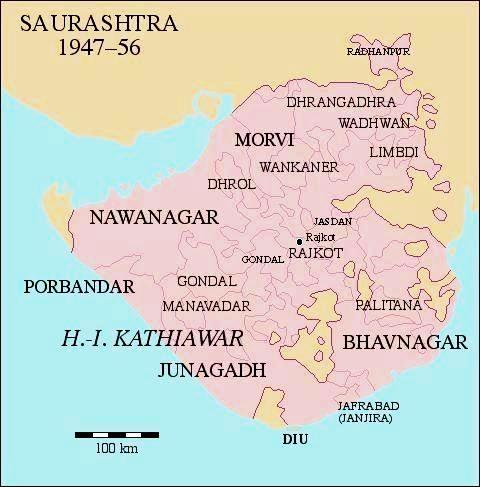
- Location of Dhrol State in Saurashtra
- Capital: Dhrol
- Area
  - 1901: 732 km^{2} (283 sq mi)
- Population
  - 1901: 21,906
- History
  - Established: 1595
  - Indian independence: 15 February 1948
Preceded by	Succeeded by
Nawanagar State	India
- Today part of: Saurashtra, India

Dhrol State was one of the 562 princely states of British India. It was a 9 gun salute state belonging to the Kathiawar Agency of the Bombay Presidency. Its capital was in the town of Dhrol, located in the historical Halar region of Kathiawar.

== History ==
Dhrol State was founded in 1539 by Jam Hardholji, a brother of Jam Rawal, the founder of Nawanagar State. Dhamal Chavda who then reigned at Dhamalpur (Dhrol) obstructed the Jam brothers in their conquests in one way and another. To avenge this obstruction Jam Hardholji marched against Dhamal Chavda and after defeating him, acquired that Parganah for himself in about 1539 A. D. and founded a separate Chiefdom of some 140 villages.The Khirasra state was an offshoot of Dhrol.

Dhrol State became a British protectorate in 1807. The population of the state was decimated by the Indian famine of 1899–1900, from 27,007 in 1891 it was reduced to 21,906 in the 1901 census. The last ruler of Dhrol State, Thakur Sahib Chandrasinhji Dipsinhji, signed the accession to the Indian Union on 15 February 1948.

== Rulers ==
The rulers of the state bore the title 'Thakore Saheb'. They had the right to a 9 gun salute.

=== Rulers ===
- 1595 – .... Hardholji
- .... – .... Jasoji Hardolji
- .... – .... Bamanyanji Jasoji
- .... – .... Hardholji Bamanyanji I
- .... – 1644 Modji Hardholji
- 1644 – 1706 Kaloji I Panchanji
- 1706 – 1712 Junhoji I Kaloji
- 1712 – 1715 Ketoji Junoji
- 1715 – 1716 Kaloji II Junoji (d. 1716)
- 1716 – 1760 Vaghji Junoji
- 1760 – 1781 Jaysinhji I Vaghji
- 1781 – 1789 Junoji II Jaysinhji
- 1789 – .... Nathoji Junoji
- .... – 1803 Modji Nathoji
- 1803 – 1844 Bhuptasinhji Modji
- 1845 – 1886 Jaysinhji II Bhuptasinhji (b. 1824 – d. 1886)
- 26 Oct 1886 – 31 July 1914 Harisinhji Jaisinhji (b. 1846 – d. 1914)
- 2 September 1914 – 31 August 1937 Dolatsinhji Harisinhji (b. 1864 – d. 1937)
- 31 Aug 1937 – 1939 Jorawarsinhji Dipsinhji (b. 1910 – d. 1939)
- 10 Oct 1939 – 15 August 1947 Chandrasinhji Dipsinhji (b. 1912 – d. ....)

== See also ==
- Political integration of India
- Baroda, Western India and Gujarat States Agency
