= Aniket =

Aniket is the Hindi (as well as of the other Indo-Aryan languages having schwa deletion phenomenon) form of the masculine Indian given name Aniketa (Sanskrit: अनिकेत, romanized: Anikēta, lit. 'one who makes the world his home, lord of the world; a celestial being'). It is an epithet of Vishnu or Krishna (Shiva).

Notable people with the given name include:

- Aniket Verma (born 2005), Indian cricketer
- Aniket Chattopadhyay (born 1963), Indian journalist and film director
- Aniket Choudhary (born 1990), Indian cricketer
- Aniket Parikh (born 1997), New Zealand cricketer
- Aniket Vishwasrao (born 1981), Indian actor
- Aniket Tatkare, Indian politician
- Aniket Jadhav (born 2000), Indian professional footballer

== See also ==
- Anicet
- Anicetus
- Ankit
- Ankita
