= Rajpara =

Rajpara may refer to:

== Places ==
- Rajpara (Khodiyar), in Bhavnagar Rural (Vidhan Sabha constituency), Gujarat, India
- Rajpara (Tana), in Palitana (Vidhan Sabha constituency), Gujarat, India
- Rajpara State (Gohelwar), a former princely state in Gujarat, India
- Rajpara State (Halar), a former princely state in Gujarat, India
- Rajpara Thana, Bangladesh

== People ==
- Ankit Rajpara, Indian chess Grandmaster
