= Ankit =

Ankit is the Hindi (as well as of the other Indo-Aryan languages having schwa deletion phenomenon) form of the Indian masculine given name, Ankita (Sanskrit: अङ्कित, romanized: Aṅkita, lit. 'marked'). It is also the masculine counterpart of Ankitā. As with any adjective in the language, it can take on a nominal form.

- Ankit Bathla, Indian model and actor
- Ankit Bhardwaj, Indian film and television actor
- Ankit Dabas, Indian cricketer
- Ankit Dane, Indian cricketer
- Ankit Fadia (born 1985), Indian author and television host
- Ankit Garg, Indian police official
- Ankit Gera, Indian actor
- Ankit Gupta, Indian actor
- Ankit Jaglan, Indian Kabaddi player
- Ankit Kalsi, Indian cricketer
- Ankit Kushwah, Indian cricketer
- Ankit Lamba, Indian cricketer
- Ankit Mohan, Indian actor
- Ankit Narang, Indian actor
- Ankit Raaj, Indian television actor and model
- Ankit Rajpara, Indian chess grandmaster
- Ankit Rajpoot, Indian cricketer
- Ankit Sharma (disambiguation), multiple people
- Ankit Tiwari, Indian singer
- Ankit Trivedi, Gujarati poet

== See also ==
- Ankita, female form of this name
