= Anicetus =

Anicetus is a Latin given name, from Greek Ανίκητος (Aníkētos, lit. 'invincible'). It may also refer to:

- Hellenistic epithet used by the Greco-Bactrian and Indo-Greek kings, most importantly given to Demetrius I Anicetus (fl. 222–180 BC)
- Anicetus (freedman), 1st-century Roman commander
- Anicetus (pirate) (fl. 69), anti-Roman pirate
- Anicetus (wasp), genus
- Pope Anicetus (fl. 157–168), bishop of Rome
- Alexiares and Anicetus, minor Greek gods

== See also ==
- Anicet (disambiguation), French and Polish form
