= Maithili grammar =

Grammatical rules of the Maithili language

The Maithili language has a complex verbal system, nominal declension with a few inflections, and extensive use of honoroficity. It is an Indo-Aryan language, native to the Maithili people and is spoken in the Indian state of Bihar with some speakers in Jharkhand and nearby states. The language has a large number of speakers in Nepal too, which is second in number of speakers after Bihar, grouped under Bihari languages and Nepalese languages, often disputed by many linguists.

Maithili has the following characteristic morphological features:

- Number is not grammatically marked.
- Gender distinctions are also absent in verbs and pronouns, only marked in nominals, which in standard dialect is optional. Gender has no role in agreement of verbs and optionally with adjectives.
- There is a lexical distinction of gender in the third person pronoun, that is only among animate and inanimate classes.
- Transitive verbs are distinguished from intransitive verbs.

== Phonology ==
=== Vowels ===
		Front		Central		Back	
		short	long	short	long	short	long
Closed	Script	ɪ ⟨इ⟩	iː ⟨ई⟩			ʊ ⟨उ⟩	uː ⟨ऊ⟩
Closed	Rom.	i	ī			u	ū
Mid	Script	e ⟨ऎ⟩	eː ⟨ए⟩	ə~ɐ ⟨अ⟩	əː ⟨अ꣱ (Note: अ꣱ is often written as अ^{ऽ})अ२⟩	o ⟨ऒ⟩	oː ⟨ओ⟩
Mid	Rom.	e	ē	a		o	ō
Open	Script	æ~ɛ ⟨ऍ⟩		a ⟨ॴ⟩	aː ⟨आ⟩	ɔ ⟨अ꣱⟩	
Open	Rom.	æ/ê		ă/ä	ā	å	
Diphthongs	Script	əɪ̯ ⟨ꣾ⟩				əʊ̯ ⟨ॵ⟩	
Diphthongs	Rom.	ai				au	

- All vowels have nasal counterparts, represented by "~" in IPA and romanization, and ँ in Devanagari, upon the vowels, like आँ [ãː] .
- All vowel sounds are realized as nasal when occurring before or after a nasal consonant.
- Word final अ [a] is always deleted, except in monosyllabic words, non-syllabic य /e̯/ final words, if preceded by any non-central vowel and conjunct final words. For example, न na (no/not), प्रिय prie̯ə or even prije̯ (dear), and शास्त्र śāstra. In the middle position, it is shortened to [^{a}] /ə̆/, if unstressed. Both extra short vowel and deleted vowel are pronounced in poetry though.
- Ramavatar Yadav ignores the contrast between short and long vowels, as its length is often determined by position. Others maintain the contrast as only some of the differences can be explained by the position, but not all of them, like पुर pur 'city' vs पूर pūr 'full'. Though it is often that both of them will be pronounced as pūr, but the distinction is maintained in orthography and careful pronunciation. For this page, it will be differentiated as पु२र 'pu:r' vs पूर 'pūr', if needed.
- [ɔ] is realised as [əː] in northern dialects and o in southernmost dialects.
- There are three extra short vowels that were described by Grierson, अ [ ə̆ ] (Rom. as a ), इ' [ ɪ̆ ] (Rom. as i), उ' [ ʊ̆ ] (Rom. as u), but are not considered by Ramavatar Yadav.
- A peculiar type of phonetic change is recently taking place in Maithili by way of epenthesis, i.e. backward transposition of final extra short i and u in all sort of words. Thus:

Standard Colloquial - Common Pronunciation

अछि' / ach^{i} / - अइछ / aich / 'is'
मधु' / madh^{u} / - मउध / maudh / 'honey'
बालु' / bāl^{u} / - बाउल / bāul / 'sand'

Only extra short i and u have been applicable for this rule, however recently short i and u have started to observe same pattern, though it is very scattered, and non-standard-

रवि / rabi / - रइब / raib / 'Sunday'

This phenomenon is observed only in northern dialects, in southern dialects it is often maintained or even lengthened.

ach^{i}→(a)chī
madh^{u}→madhū
bāl^{u}→bālū
rabi→rabī

- ꣾ is a Unicode letter in Devanagari, (IPA /əe̯/) which is not supported currently on several browsers and operating systems, along with its mātrā (vowel sign).

The following diphthongs are present:

अय/ꣾ / əe̯ / ~ /ɛː/ - अयसन/ꣾसन /aisan/ ~ /êsan/ 'like this'
अउ/ॵ / əo̯ / ~ /ɔː/- चउमुख/चॏमुख /caumukh/ ~ /cåmukh/ 'four faced'
अऎ /ꣾ / əe̯ / - अऎलाह/ꣾलाह /aelah/ 'came'
अऒ/ॵ / əo̯ / - अऒताह/ॵताह /aotah/ 'will come'
आइ / aːi̯ / - आइ /āi/ 'today'
आउ / aːu̯ / - आउ /āu/ 'come please'
आऎ / aːe̯ / - आऎल /āel/ 'came'
आऒ / aːo̯ / - आऒब /āob/ 'will come'
यु/इउ / iu̯/ - घ्यु/घिउ /ghiu/ 'ghee'
यॆ/इऎ / ie̯ / - यॆह/इऎह /ieh/ 'only this' (dialectical variation of इहꣿ/यꣿह)
इऒ / io̯ / - कहिऒ /kahio/ 'any day'
उइ / ui̯ / - दुइ /dui/ 'two'
वॆ/उऎ /ue̯/ - वॆह/उऎह /ue:h/ 'only that' (dialectical variation of उहꣿ/वꣿह)

There are some graphemes, borrowed from Sanskrit, which are written as pronounced in Sanskrit-

Letter	Sans. Pron.	Rom.	Maithili Pron.
ऋ	r̩	r̥/ṛ	r̩/rɪ
ॠ	r̩ː	r̥̄/ṝ	r̩ː/riː
ऌ	l̩	l̥/ḷ	l̩/lɪ
ऐ	ae̯ː / aːɪ̯	various	
औ	ao̯ː / aːʊ̯	various	

=== Consonants ===
Maithili has four classes of stops, one class of affricate, which is generally treated as a stop series, related nasals, fricatives and approximant.

				Labial	Dental/ Alveolar	Retroflex	Palatal	Velar	Glottal
Nasal		unaspirated	Script	m ⟨म⟩	n ⟨न⟩	(ɳ) ⟨ण⟩ (Note: Often pronounced as /n/ or /ɽ̃/. Original pronunciation is also prevalent though.)	ɲ ⟨ञ⟩ (Note: Independent ञ is used for representing nasalised vowels, such as ञ for /ə̃/ and ञि for /ɪ̃/.)	ŋ ⟨ङ⟩	
Nasal		unaspirated	Rom.	m	n	ṇ	ñ	ṅ	
Nasal		aspirated	Script	mʱ ⟨म्ह⟩ (Note: Aspirated nasals, and the aspirated rhotic are written as conjunct with ह /ɦ/, but they are not, they are treated as a single phoneme in Maithili.)	nʱ ⟨न्ह⟩	(ɳʱ) ⟨ण्ह⟩	(ɲʱ) ⟨ञ्ह⟩	(ŋʱ) ⟨ङ्ह⟩	
Nasal		aspirated	Rom.	mh	nh	ṇh	ñh	ṅh	
Plosive/ Affricate	voiceless	unaspirated	Script	p ⟨प⟩	t ⟨त⟩	ʈ ⟨ट⟩	tɕ ⟨च⟩	k ⟨क⟩	
Plosive/ Affricate	voiceless	unaspirated	Rom.	p	t	ṭ	c	k	
Plosive/ Affricate	voiceless	aspirated	Script	pʰ ⟨फ⟩	tʰ ⟨थ⟩	ʈʰ ⟨ठ⟩	tɕʰ ⟨छ⟩	kʰ ⟨ख⟩	
Plosive/ Affricate	voiceless	aspirated	Rom.	ph	th	ṭh	ch	kh	
Plosive/ Affricate	voiced	unaspirated	Script	b ⟨ब⟩	d ⟨द⟩	ɖ ⟨ड⟩	dʑ ⟨ज⟩	ɡ ⟨ग⟩	
Plosive/ Affricate	voiced	unaspirated	Rom.	b	d	ḍ	j	g	
Plosive/ Affricate	voiced	aspirated	Script	bʱ ⟨भ⟩	dʱ ⟨ध⟩	ɖʱ ⟨ढ⟩	dʑʱ ⟨झ⟩	ɡʱ ⟨घ⟩	
Plosive/ Affricate	voiced	aspirated	Rom.	bh	dh	ḍh	jh	gh	
Fricative	voiceless		Script	(ɸ~f) ⟨ः/ष्⟩	s ⟨स⟩	(ʂ) ⟨ष⟩	(ɕ) ⟨श⟩	(x) ⟨ः/ष्⟩	-(h)* ⟨ः⟩
Fricative	voiceless		Rom.	ḫ	s	ṣ/s	ś/s	ḫ(x)	ḥ
Fricative	voiced		Script				(ʑ) ⟨य⟩		ɦ ⟨ह⟩
Fricative	voiced		Rom.				y(ž)		h
Rhotic	unaspirated		Script		ɾ~r ⟨र⟩	(ɽ) ⟨ड़⟩			
Rhotic	unaspirated		Rom.		r	ṛ			
Rhotic	aspirated		Script		rʱ ⟨र्ह⟩	(ɽʱ) ⟨ढ़⟩			
Rhotic	aspirated		Rom.		rh	ṛh			
Lateral	unaspirated		Script		l ⟨ल⟩				
Lateral	unaspirated		Rom.		l				
Lateral	aspirated		Script		lʱ ⟨ल्ह⟩				
Lateral	aspirated		Rom.		lh				
Approximant			Script	(ʋ~w) ⟨व⟩			(j) ⟨य⟩		
Approximant			Rom.	v			y		

- Fricative sounds [ʂ, ɕ] only occur marginally, and are typically pronounced as a dental fricative /s/ in most styles of pronunciation.
- [ɽ] and [rʱ]- both are defective phonemes, occurring intervocalically and word finally only if preceded by a nasal consonant. Word finally and postvocalically, /ɖʱ/ surfaces as [ɽʱ~rʱ]. Non-initially, both are interchangeable with [ɽ~ɾ] and [ɽʱ~rʱ] respectively.
- Approximant sounds [ʋ, w, j] and fricative sounds [ɸ, ɕ, ʃ, ʂ, x], mainly occur in words that are borrowed from Sanskrit or in words of Perso-Arabic origin. [v, w] are replaced by [b]. Word initial [ʋ, w] can be replaced by [o] in non-tatsama words. Word initial [j], and [j] between [r/ɾ] and central vowels are replaced by [dʑ] in tatsama words, and in rest of the positions by [e]. Word initial [j] can be replaced by ['i] in non-tatsama words. Both [j] and [ʋ/w] can occur due to glide formation. Perso-Arabic and fricatives [f, z, ʃ, x] are generally replaced by [pʰ, dʑ, s, kʰ] respectively, even in orthography, whereas Sanskrit [ɕ, ʂ]) are replaced by [s], but only in speech, in orthography, Sanskrit spelling is often followed, but can be replaced by [s]. [ɸ~f] and [x] are the occurrences of remnants of Sanskrit jihvamuliya and upadhmaniya. The conjunct [ʂp] is pronounced [ɸp] in Maithili e.g. [pʊɸp(ə)]. The conjunct [ɦj] is pronounced [ɦʑ] as in [graːɦʑə].

These non-syllabic vowels in Maithili- e̯, o̯ written in Devanagari as य़/य, व.

=== Stress ===
Stress is not as strong in Maithili as in English. It is useful for determining the pronunciation of अ [a] though. The stress is not indicated in writing in native scripts, though indicated in this section.

- Final unpronounced अ [a→∅], final extra short इ' [^{i}] and उ' [^{u}] are not considered for counting syllables for determining the position of stress. Conjunct consonants are considered long.
- Monosyllabic words have the accent on the single vowel. As in न ˈna "not", ई ˈī "this", के ˈkē "who", and माछ ˈmāch "fish".
- The accent falls on the final vowel, if it is long and closed (i.e. followed by a consonant or consonant cluster). As in किसा॔न kiˈsān "farmer", दॆखलिꣾ॔न्हि' dekh^{a}liˈainh^{i} "I saw" (object - 3PHon.), and दॆखलहू॔न्हि' dekh^{a}laˈhūnh^{i} "You saw" (object - 3PHon.).
- The accent falls on the penultimate (i.e. the word being vowel final), if it is long. As in पा॔नि ˈpāni "water", and छॊट॔क्का choˈṭakkā "small" (adj. long form).
- In non-tatsama words, the accent falls on the antepenultimate in the rest of the cases. As in ह॔मरा ˈham^{a}rā "me", and दॆ॔खलहुँ ˈdekh^{a}lahũ "I saw".
- In tatsama words, the accent falls on the vowel before the antepenultimate. It may alternatively be on the antepenultimate. कु॔टिलता ˈkuṭilatā or कुटि॔लता kuˈṭil^{a}tā "deceitfulness".
- If the initial vowel doesn't have a primary accent (as explained above), it carries a secondary accent. As in कि॓सा॔न ˌkiˈsān, दॆ॓खलिꣾ॔न्हि' ˌdekh^{a}liˈainh^{i}, छॊ॓ट॔क्का ˌchoˈṭakkā, कु॓टि॔लता ˌkuˈṭil^{a}tā.
- Words with a final इ' [^{i}] and उ' [^{u}] always have secondary accent on the preceding vowel, if it doesn't have the primary accent. As in दॆ॔ख॓थि' ˈdēˌkhath^{i} or ˈdeˌkhaith "he/she (Hon.) saw", क॔कर॓हुँ' ˈkak^{a}ˌrah^{ũ} or kˈak^{a}rˌaũh "anyone (acc.)", दॆ॔खल॓हुँ' ˈdekh^{a}ˌlah^{ũ} or ˈdekh^{a}ˌlaũh "I saw".
- Causative verbs, whether finite or non-finite, have the primary accent on the final vowel of the root verb, if it has four ir less syllables. If more syllables, then it is optional, it may be stressed if it needs to be stressed. As in ह॓टा॔ऎब ˌhaˈtāeb "to remove" (infinitive)/ "I will remove", but प॓हुँचꣿलथी॔न्हि' ˌpahũcăel^{a}thˈīnh^{i} or प॓हुँचऻ॔ꣾलथीन्हि' ˌpahũcăˈel^{a}thīnh^{i} "he/she (Hon.) sent".
- अ [a], if unstressed, is always deleted word finally. It is shortened to [^{a}], in other positions, but may be retained if it is not just after the stressed vowel. As in कु॔टिलता ˈkuṭilatā "deceitfulness". Here [a] after [l] is retained, even though it is unstressed.

=== Rule of the Short Antepenultimate ===
This peculiar rule was first observed by Hoernle, but properly described by Grierson. It is a very important and essential rule for Maithili and other Bihari languages.

- For this rule the final unpronounced अ [a→∅], final extra short इ' [^{i}] and उ' [^{u}] are not considered for counting syllables, and diphthongs are considered as separate syllables, except for the verbal suffices ꣾ [ai] ॵ [au], which are otherwise considered as अइ and अउ for this rule.
- Any long monophthong, in antepenultimate position is shortened, if it is not followed by the euphonics य or व/अ (pronounced [a]). (Note: Alternatively, if non-central vowel not followed by central vowel.) As in बऻतिया bătiyā (the talk), ॴगिया ăgiyā (the fire), नऻउआ/नॏआ năuā (the barber), मऻरलक măr^{a}lak (he/she/it killed/beaten), सिखलक sikh^{a}lak (he/she/it learned), दॆखलक dekh^{a}lak (he/she/it saw), सुतलन्हि' sut^{a}lanh^{i} (he/she slept), but सीयलक sīalak (he/she/it sewed), चूअलऻह cualăh (it/he/she dripped).
- ॴ [ā] is often replaced by अ [a], when there is no confusion in meaning. As in बऻतिया/बतिया bătiyā/batiyā, and ॴगिया/अगिया ăgiya/agiyā. In verbs, the difference between the two is very important for the difference in the meaning. As in मऻरलहुँ' măr^{a}lah^{ũ} (I killed) v/s मरलहुँ mar^{a}lah^{ũ} (I was killed). In verbs, therefore the difference is always maintained.
- Any long monophthong in a position further removed from antepenultimate position is always shortened, whether followed by euphonic syllable or not. As in चुअलकꣿ cualakai (it/he/she dripped), हॊइꣾ hoiai (I become), दॆखितिॵ dekhitiau (if I had seen you (Non-Hon.)).
- Doubled consonants are shortened to single, and the vowel before nasal conjuncts are nasalised, and the nasal consonant is removed, or alternatively the conjunct is converted to the corresponding nasal consonant, if they are to be shortened. As in छॊटकवा choṭak^{a}vā (small), बँधुआ bãdhuā or बन्हुआ banhuā (bound).

== Morphology ==
=== Nouns ===
Nouns in Maithili can be roughly characterized into four genders- Masculine, Feminine, Neuter and Common. (Note: Grierson distinguished only two- Masculine and Feminine. Traditional grammars, however, have the given fourfold distinction. Because of the lack of grammatical gender, many modern grammarians have rejected the distinction altogether.) Unmarked nouns can be of any gender. Marked nouns are those nouns, which can be distinguished by its suffix. Marked nouns are mostly either Masculine-neuter or Feminine.(Masculine and neuter, and sometimes even common gender are distinguished, if the word is of tatsama origin). There is no grammatical gender however, i.e. nouns can be distinguished by the suffix in the marked nouns, and overall by the origin of the word, but that doesn't affect other parts of speech. (There are some forms, but are optional and obsolete, and are generally ignored in modern speech and writing). The only instance, where grammatical agreement occurs are adjectives, which are also optional, and in spoken language, often ignored altogether. Maithili is therefore often considered to be lacking grammatical gender altogether. It might have marked nouns, but they rarely form an agreement with the verb.

Similarly, grammatical number is also absent. There are some forms of plural present, but there is no grammatical distinction. Periphrastic plural is used, but again there is no grammatical distinction.

Many Maithili nouns usually take forms in weak (ending in a consonant, a short vowel, or an extra short vowel) and strong stem (ending in long vowels). Some take form only in weak stem and some in strong stem.

The following table shows a general view of them. Obsolete and old forms are shown within parentheses, in the stem ending ending section.

Key: M- Masculine, F- Feminine, N- Neuter gender ∅- No addition to the stem, ×- No form exists

Stem	Gender	Stem Endings		Examples			Comments (Note: Original indicates OIA forms.)
Stem	Gender	Weak	Strong	Weak	Strong	Translation	Comments
∅/-a	MNF	∅, (-u)	×, (-ō)	लोक lok, घर ghar, बात bāt		people, house, talk	F not original, original ending collapsed.
∅/-a	MN	∅, (-u)	-ā, (-ō)	घोड़ ghōḍ, लोह lōh	घोड़ा ghōḍā, लोहा lōhā	horse, iron	Formed out of MN suffix -aka.
∅/-a	F	∅, -^{i}, (-u)	×,-ī (optional), (+ō)	बाँह bā̃h/बाँहि' bā̃h^{i}, भूल bhūl/‌भूलि' bhūl^{i}	बाँही bā̃hī	shoulder, mistake	F not original, overt suffix applied.
-ā	F	×, (-u)	-ā, (+ō)		सभा sabhā, जनता janatā, माता mātā	assembly, people, mother	Original -ā. Also includes original -r̥(ā).
-ā	MN	×	-ā		पिता pitā, नेता nētā	father, leader	Original r̥ (ā) and ān (ā).
-^{i}	F	-^{i}**	-ī	दूरि' dūr^{i}, माटि' māṭ^{i}, भुइँ bhuĩ	दूरी dūrī, माटी maṭī, भुईँ bhuī̃	distance, soil, earth	Original F -ī, -i, -ini, -āni, ā, -ikā and iyā. For original -ā, original ending replaced.
-i	MN	-i	-ī	नाति nāti, (अभि)मानि (abhi)man^{i}	नाती nātī, (अभि)मानी (abhi)manī	grandson (through daughter), proud	Original -ī (in) suffix, and some original MN -iya, -ika, -r̥̄(ka) as well as MN -r̥(ā/r̥).
-i	MNF	-i	×*	रवि ravi, पानि pāni	*	sun, water	Original -i, and MN -iya.
-ī	MNF	×	-ī		खरी kharī/खड़ी khaḍī, मोती mōtī	chalk, pearl	Original F -ī, and MNF -ika/ikā, -iya/iyā.
-^{u}/ū	MF	-^{u}**/∅	-ū	मामु' māmu/माम mām, नाउ nāu, पुतोहु' putōh^{u}/पुतोह putōh	मामू māmū, नाऊ nāū, पुतोहू putōhū	maternal uncle (mother's brother), barber, daughter-in-law	Original MFN -u and F -ū, as well as MFN -uka/ukā and MN -a (not in the last MFN class -u stem)
-^{u}/ū	N	-^{u}**/∅	×*	मधु' madh^{u}/मध madh	*	honey	Original MFN -u and F -ū, as well as MFN -uka/ukā and MN -a (not in the last MFN class -u stem)
-u	MNF	-u	×*	आँसु ā̃su, वसु vasu	*	a tear, the vasus (a class of Vedic deities)	Original MFN -u and F -ū, as well as MFN -uka/ukā and MN -a (not in the last MFN class -u stem)
-ū	MNF	×	-ū		डाकू dakū, उजाड़ू ujāḍū, मॆहरारू mehrārū	dacoit, destroyer, wife	Original MFN -u and F -ū, as well as MFN -uka/ukā and MN -a (not in the last MFN class -u stem)
-ē		×	-ē		साबे sābē		Formed out of merging of phonemes. Rare.
-ō		×	-ō		भादो bhādō	a month name in Hindu calendar	Formed out of merging of phonemes. Rare.

- *Some stems in "i" and "u" don't have long forms in common sense, but they have a plural in long vowel, such as पानी pānī for पानि pāni (water), and आँसू ā̃sū for आँसु ā̃su (tear). Since Maithili doesn't have a strong distinction of grammatical number, these are treated in various ways. In forms which are less likely to have plural, and most of the tatsama words, like रवि ravi (sun), वसु vasu (the vasus) don't use the strong stem, whereas things which are mostly plural like आँसू ā̃sū (tears) and दाढ़ी dāḍhī (beard) tend to use the strong stem. Some use both such पानि pāni and पानी pānī (water), दहि dahi and दही dahī (curd).
- **इ' -i and उ' -u are postvacalically इ -i and उ -u respectively.

==== Forms of nouns ====
Nouns in Maithili also have a peculiar long form. This long form denotes several meanings-

1. It denotes diminutive or often low honour meaning.
2. It also denotes definite nature of the noun.
3. For proper nouns, neuter and inanimate, it signifies familiarity and definiteness (like definite article), it doesn't have a strong diminutive meaning, but is still considered unfit for use outside a narrative, such as in title, as a definite article does.
4. For personal names, it signifies both familiarity and diminutive.

This Long form is formed by adding the आ -ā suffix to the ending.

- Glides य [y] and व [w] often occur between the stem and the suffix.
- Stems in इ' -^{i} and उ' -^{u} are taken as इ -i and उ -u.
- All the stem endings in ई -ī, ऊ -ū, ए -ē and ओ -ō are shortened to इ -i, उ -u, ऎ -e and ऒ -o, when the suffix is added.
- The stems in अ -a/∅, ओ -ō and उ/उ' -u/^{u} take the suffix (अ)वा -(a)wā (optional in ओ -o and उ/उ' -u/^{u} ending stem) when masculine-neuter and इया -iyā when feminine. Stems in आ -ā take the suffix as (अ)वा -(a)wā, irrespective of gender.
- Stem endings in अ/∅ -a/∅ are made अ -^{a} when the suffix is added.
- These long forms can be made extra long by adding the आ -ā suffix again to the long form. In this process stems in अ -a/∅ form the extra long form as अववा -aw^{a}wā, which is always contracted to ॵवा -auwā. Stems in इ -i and उ -u, of any length, form the long form as इयवा -iyawā and उअवा uawā respectively, which are optionally contracted to ईया -īyā and ऊआ ūā respectively.

This is a table along with examples-

Stem	Word	Long form	Extra long form	Translation
∅/-a	घर ghar, घोड़ ghōḍ, लोह lōh	घरवा ghar^{a}wā, घॊड़वा ghoḍ^{a}wā, लॊहवा loh^{a}wā	घरॏवा gharauwā, घॊड़ॏवा ghōḍauwā, लॊहॏवा lōhauwā	house, horse, iron
∅/-a	बात bāt, बाँह bā̃h/बाँहि' bā̃hi	बऻतिया bătiyā, (Note: ॴ [ā] is often replaced by अ [a], when there is no confusion in meaning. As in बऻतिया/बतिया bătiyā/batiyā, and ॴगिया/अगिया ăgiya/agiyā.) बऻँहिया bẵhiyā	बऻतियवा/बऻतीवा bătiyā/bătīwā, बऻँहियवा/बऻँहीवा bẵhiyā/bẵhīwā	talk, shoulder
-ā	सभा sabhā, बूना/बुन्दा būnā/bundā, नेता nētā	सभवा sabh^{a}wā, बुनवा/बुँदवा bunawā/bũdawā, नेतवा net^{a}wā	सभॏवा sabhauwā, बुनॏवा/बुँदॏवा bunauwā/bũdauwā, नेतॏवा netauwā	assembly, drop/zero, leader
-^{i}/i/ī	भुइँ bhuĩ, माटि' māṭi, नाति nāti, रवि ravi, पानि pāni, मोती mōtī	भुइँया bhuĩyā, मऻटिया măṭiyā, नऻतिया nătiyā, रविया raviyā, पऻनिया păniyā, मॊतिया motiya	भुइँअवा/भुईँवा bhuĩyawā/bhuī̃wā, मऻटियवा/मऻटीवा măṭiyawā/măṭīwā, नऻतियवा/नऻतीवा nătiyawā/nătīwā, रवियवा/रवीवा raviyawā/ravīwā, पऻनियवा/पऻनीवा păniyawā/pănīwā, मॊतिया/मॊतीवा motiyawā/motīwā	earth, soil, grandson( through daughter), sun, pearl
-^{u}/u/ū	मामु' māmu, नाउ nāu, पुतोहु' putōhu, आँसु ā̃su, डाकू dākū	मऻमुआ mămuā/ मऻमवा măm^{a}wā, नऻउवा/नॏवा năuwā/nauwā, पुतॊहिया putohiyā, ॴँसुआ ẵsuā, डऻकुआ dăkuā	मऻमुअवा/मऻमूआ/मऻमॏवा mămuawā/mămūwā/mămauwā, नऻउअवा/नऻऊवा năuawā/năūwā, पुतॊहियवा/पुतॊहीया putohiyawā/putohīyā, ॴँसुअवा/ॴँसूवा ẵsuawā/ẵsūwā, डऻकुअवा/डऻकूवा dăkuawā, dăkūwā	maternal uncle (mother's brother), barber, daughter-in-law, tear
ē	साबे sābē	सऻबॆआ/सऻबॆया săbe(y)ā	सऻबॆयवा/सऻबेवा săbey^{a}wā/sabēwā	
ō	भादो bhādō	भऻदॊआ/भऻदवा bhădoā/bhăd^{a}wā	भऻदोवा/भऻदॏवा bhădōwā/bhădauwā	the month bhādrapada

==== Nominal Declension ====
Nouns are inflected for several cases, some of them are fusional, and some are formed with case markers (post-positional).

Stem	Nom.	Obl.	Erg. (Note: The ergative case is used mostly in the Southern dialects.)	Instr.	Gen. (Note: The ending is optionally shortened in length in Southern dialects, when the genitive suffix is added. Instead of क k, र r is also met in southern dialects.)	Loc.
-अ a/∅	∅ घर ghar, नेना nēnā		-एँ ē̃ घरेँ gharē̃, नेनेँ nēnē̃		-अक ak घरक gharak, नेनाक nēnāk	-ए e घरे gharē, कहले kah^{a}lē
-आ ā	∅ घर ghar, नेना nēnā		-एँ ē̃ (Note: In ā stems, the ergative suffix is sometimes added after ā. The stems of radical consonants, after converted into ā stem, are also treated same.) -आँ ā̃ घोड़ेँ/घोड़ाँ ghōḍē̃/ghōdā̃, कहलेँ/ कहलाँ kah^{a}lē̃/ kah^{a}lā̃	-एँ ē̃ घोड़ेँ ghōḍē̃, कहलेँ kah^{a}lē̃	-आक āk/ अक ak घोड़ाक/ घोड़क ghōḍāk/ ghoḍak, कहलाक/ कहलक kah^{a}lāk/ kah^{a}lak	-ए e घरे gharē, कहले kah^{a}lē
-र/ड़/ल/न/म/ब r/ṛ/l/n/m/b (a/∅) (Note: This is optional in most cases, compulsory in verbal nouns, and participles, most of which fall in this category.)	∅ घोड़ ghōḍ/घोड़ा ghōḍā, कहल kahal	+आ ā घोड़ा ghōḍā, कहला kah^{a}lā	-एँ ē̃ -आँ ā̃ घोड़ेँ/घोड़ाँ ghōḍē̃/ghōdā̃, कहलेँ/ कहलाँ kah^{a}lē̃/ kah^{a}lā̃	-एँ ē̃ घोड़ेँ ghōḍē̃, कहलेँ kah^{a}lē̃	-आक āk/ अक ak घोड़ाक/ घोड़क ghōḍāk/ ghoḍak, कहलाक/ कहलक kah^{a}lāk/ kah^{a}lak	-ए e घरे gharē, कहले kah^{a}lē
Other vocalic stems	∅ नदि' nad^{i}, स्त्री strī		+एँ ē̃, ँ ̃ (nasalisation) नदिएँ/ नदीँ nadĩ/ nadiē̃, स्त्रीँ/ स्त्रिएँ strī̃ striē̃	+एँ ē̃ नदिएँ nadiē̃, स्त्रिएँ striē̃	+क k नदीक/नदिक nadīk/ nadik, स्त्रीक/ स्त्रिक strīk/ strik	+ए e नदिए nadiē

"-" indicates addition to the stem, "+" indicates addition additional to the stem.

Old Maithili Declension

Stem	Nom.-Acc.		Erg./Instr.			Instr.-Abl.-Dat.	Gen.	Gen.-Dat.	Loc.			
Stem	sg.	pl.	sg.			pl.	sg.	pl.	sg.			pl.
Stem	sg.	pl.	Com.	Diph.	Asp.	pl.	sg.	pl.	Com.	Diph.	Asp.	pl.
-अ a/∅	∅	-(अ)न/नि (a)n/ni	-एँ ē̃, nasal-isation, -एन/ण* ēn/ṇ*	-अइँ ahĩ	-अहिँ aĩ	-एहि ēhi, -अन्हि anhi	-(अ)क (a)k -(अ)ह ah, -(अ)स/स्स* (a)s/ss*	-आँ(क) ā̃(k), आह āh, -आन/ण ān/ṇ	-ए ē, -इत it	-अइ ai	-अहि ahi	-एहु ēhu, -आँ ā̃
-आ ā	∅	-(अ)न/नि (a)n/ni	-एँ ē̃, nasal-isation	-अइँ ahĩ	-अहिँ aĩ	-एहि ēhi, -अन्हि anhi	-(अ)क (a)k -(अ)ह ah, -(अ)स/स्स* (a)s/ss*	-आँ(क) ā̃(k), आह āh, -आन/ण ān/ṇ	-ए ē, -इत it	-अइ ai	-अहि ahi	-एहु ēhu, -आँ ā̃
-आ ā (fem.)	∅	-(अ)न/नि (a)n/ni	-एँ ē̃, nasal-isation	-अइँ ahĩ	-अहिँ aĩ	-(अ)हि (a)hi -(अ)न्हि (a)nhi	-(अ)क (a)k -(अ)ह ah, -(अ)स/स्स* (a)s/ss*	-आँ(क) ā̃(k), आह āh, -आन/ण ān/ṇ	-ए ē, -इत it	-अइ ai	-अहि ahi	-(आ)हु āhu, -आँ ā̃
-इ	∅	-ई ī, -इन/इनि in/ini	-एँ ē̃, nasal-isation	-अइँ ahĩ	-अहिँ aĩ	-(अ)हि (a)hi -(अ)न्हि (a)nhi	-(अ)क (a)k -(अ)ह ah, -(अ)स/स्स* (a)s/ss*	+(stem lengthened) ह‌ h, +(stem lengthened) न/ण n/ṇ	-ए ē, -इत it	-अइ ai	-अहि ahi	-(आ)हु āhu, -आँ ā̃
-उ	∅	-ऊ ū, -उन/उनि un/uni	-एँ ē̃, nasal-isation	-अइँ ahĩ	-अहिँ aĩ	-(अ)हि (a)hi -(अ)न्हि (a)nhi	-(अ)क (a)k -(अ)ह ah, -(अ)स/स्स* (a)s/ss*	+(stem lengthened) ह‌ h, +(stem lengthened) न/ण n/ṇ	-ए ē, -इत it	-अइ ai	-अहि ahi	-(आ)हु āhu, -आँ ā̃
Other vocalic stems	∅	-न/नि n/ni	-एँ ē̃, nasal-isation	-अइँ ahĩ	-अहिँ aĩ	-(अ)हि (a)hi -(अ)न्हि (a)nhi	-(अ)क (a)k -(अ)ह ah, -(अ)स/स्स* (a)s/ss*	+(stem lengthened) ह‌ h, +(stem lengthened) न/ण n/ṇ	-ए ē, -इत it	-अइ ai	-अहि ahi	-(आ)हु āhu, -आँ ā̃

Only to the first three stems, declension is added to the stem.

- Prakrit and Sanskrit endings are marked with *. These are found only in loanwords from those languages.
- Locative -ए ē is not used for animate nouns.
- When suffixes with initial vowel are added to the stem, the stem is shortened in length, such as स्त्रिएँ striē̃ (by the woman) from स्त्री strī (woman), भाषहि bhāṣahi (in the language) from भाषा bhāṣā (language).
- Some old Maithili forms are not found today in direct use, but most of them can be found in limited roles-
  - The nominative plural suffix -(अ)न/नि (a)n/ni is found in some found in the honorific forms of pronouns such as हुनि huni (he/she-Hon.), कनिका kanikā (whose -Hon.), as well as some plural markers, such as लॊकनि lok^{a}ni and ॴरनि ăr^{a}ni. It is still present in Bhojpuri, and therefore in the western Maithili dialects, it is still found.
  - The instrumental plural suffix -(अ)न्हि (a)nhi is used in some honorific stems of verbs, such as कहलिऎन्हि' kah^{a}liainh^{i} (I said (to him/her-Hon.), and सुनथीन्हि' sun^{a}thīnh^{i} (he/she-Hon. listens).
  - Plural genitive suffix -आह āh/(stem lengthened) + ह h is used for forming the 3rd person honorific form of simple past intransitive verbs, such as सुतलाह sut^{a}lāh (he/she-Hon. slept).
  - Both singular and plural genitive suffix -(अ/आ)ह (a/ā)h, and instrumental and locative plural suffixes -(ए/अ)हि (ē/a)hi, and -(ए/अ)हु (ē/a)hu as well as the aspirated suffixes of instrumental and locative singular -अहि, -अहिँ are used to form adverbs and adverbial nouns, such as पछिमाहा pachimāhā (the western one), धीमहि dhīmahi (slowly).
  - Stems in "i" and "u" have a plural in long vowel, such as पानी pānī for पानि pāni (water), and आँसू ā̃sū for आँसु ā̃su (tear), but since Maithili doesn't have a strong distinction of grammatical number, these are treated in various ways. In forms which are less likely to have plural, and most of the tatsama words, like रवि ravi (sun), वसु vasu (the vasus) don't use the plural form, whereas things which are mostly plural like आँसू ā̃sū (tears) and दाढ़ी dāḍhī (beard) tend to use it. Some use both such पानि pāni and पानी pānī (water), दहि dahi and दही dahī (curd).
  - Number was not so clearly marked even in Old Maithili, therefore they were used interchangeably with singular.

=== Gender ===
Gender in Maithili is generally not in agreement, though it can be identified through suffixes. Some masculine nouns are converted to feminine using suffixes, others are common for both the genders. Neuter is sometimes separate from Masculine. Some neuters are diminutive and are marked like feminine. Both tadbhava and tatsama suffixes are used for different words of different origin. This is also useful for declining adjectives.

Stem	Origin	Gender	Example	Feminine/ Masculine		Common		Neuter	
Stem	Origin	Gender	Example	Suffix	Example	Suffix	Example	Suffix	Example
-अ a/∅	Tats.	MN	सुन्दर गौर	ई/आ (F)	सुन्दरी गौरा/गौरी	∅	सुन्दर गौर	Same as neuter	
-अ a/∅	Tats.	MN	सुन्दर गौर	इ' (F)	सुन्दरि' गौरि'	∅	सुन्दर गौर	Same as neuter	
-अ a/∅	Tad.	MN	गोर बड्ड/ ब^{ऽ}ड़ बाघ	इ' (F)	गोरि' बड़ि'	∅	गोर बड़	Same as neuter	
-अ a/∅	Tad.	M	गोर बड्ड/ ब^{ऽ}ड़ बाघ	इनि॑	बाघिनि'				
-अ a/∅	Tad.	F	बात	-					
-अ a/∅	Tad.	F	बाँह/ बाँहि'	-					
-आ ā	Tats.	F	लता	-					
-आ ā	Tad.	MN	घोड़ा	ई	घोड़ी	∅/ आ	घोड़/ घोड़ा	Same as neuter	
-ई/इ	Tats./ Tad.	M	माली/मालि	इनि'	मालिनि'	इ/ इन्	मालि/ मालिन्	इन्	हस्तिन्
-ऋ/आ	Tats./ Tad.	MN (Some F also)	कर्ता नेता	री/ रि'	कर्त्री/कर्त्रि' नेत्री/ नेत्रि'	इन्	कर्त्रिन्	इन्/ आर्	कर्त्रिन्/ कर्तार्

=== Adjectives ===
Comparisons are made by using the instrumental postposition så̃ सँ꣱ (see below) the noun takes the oblique case and the combination of "noun + postposition" gets the instrumental case, and words like ār^{u} आरु', bahut बहुत, baḍḍ बड्ड, adhik अधिक ("more") and kam कम ("less") are added for relative comparisons. The word for "more" is optional, while "less" is required, so that in the absence of either, "more" will be inferred.

There are some inflectional comparative and superlative adjectival forms using suffixes, more in tatsama forms, and in tadbhava forms also sometimes.

		English example	Suffix	Examples
Comparative	Tatsama	-er	-तर, -ईय/एय/आय -tar, -īya/ēya/āya	गुरुतर, गरीय, श्रेय, ज्याय gurutar, garīya (heavier), śrēya (better), jyāya (elder)
Comparative	Tadbhava	-er	-तर, -ए/इया -tar, -ē/iyā	बड़तर, बड़े, बढ़िया baḍ^{a}tar, baḍē (greater, elder), baḍhiyā (better)
Superlative	Tatsama	-est	-तम, -एष्ठ -tam, -ēṣṭha	गुरुतम, गरिष्ठ, श्रेष्ठ, ज्येष्ठ gurutam, gariṣṭha (heaviest), śrēṣṭha (best), jyēṣṭha (eldest)
Superlative	Tadbhava	-est	-तम, -एठ -tam, -ēṭh	बड़तम, बड़ेठ, जेठ, बढ़ेठ baḍ^{a}tam, baḍēṭh (greatest), jēṭh (eldest), baḍhēṭh (best)

=== Adpositions ===
The aforementioned inflectional case system only goes so far on its own, and rather serves as that upon which is built a system of agglutinative suffixes or particles known as postpositions or Case markers. It is their use with a noun or verb that necessitates the noun taking the oblique case, and it is with them that the locus of grammatical function or "case-marking" then lies.

Case-markers
Case		Marker	Example	English	Explanation	Old forms and dialectical variation
Nominative		—	नेना nēnā घोड़/घोड़ा ghōḍ/ghōḍā घर ghar	boy horse house	marks the subject	
Accusative		—	नेना nēnā घोड़/घोड़ा ghōḍ/ghōḍā घर ghar	boy horse house	marks the direct object (definite and animate are only marked)	
Accusative		केँ kē̃ (Note: Both nasalised and non-nasalised forms are in use, such as केँ kē̃ and के kē, मेँ mē̃ and मे mē.), (see below)	नेना केँ nēnā kē̃ घोड़ा केँ ghōḍā kē̃ घर केँ ghar kē̃	boy horse house	marks the direct object (definite and animate are only marked)	कꣿँ kaĩ, काँ kā̃, कोँ kō̃, त ta
Dative		केँ kē̃, (see below)	नेना केँ nēnā kē̃ घोड़ा केँ ghōḍā kē̃ घर केँ ghar kē̃	to the boy/horse/house	marks the indirect object (can also mark the subjects)	कꣿँ kaĩ, काँ kā̃, कोँ kō̃, त ta
Ergative (Note: (Non-standard, only in Old Maithili and southern dialects))		-एँ ē̃, ने nē	नेनेँ, नेना ने nēnē̃, nēnā nē घोड़ेँ, घोड़ा ने ghōḍē̃, ghōḍā nē घरेँ, घर ने gharē̃, ghar nē		marks the subject for transitive verbs, only present in some Southern dialects	
Instrumental		-एँ ē̃	नेनेँ nēnē̃ घोड़ेँ ghōḍē̃ घरेँ gharē̃	with the boy/horse/house	marks the instrument of the action; "with", "using", "by"	सꣿँ saĩ, सोँ sō̃, सॏँ saĩ, ते tē, त ta
Instrumental-Ablative		सँ꣱ så̃ (Note: सँ sã is also in use alternatively.)	नेना सँ꣱ nēnā så̃ घोड़ा सँ꣱ ghōḍā så̃ घर सँ꣱ ghar så̃	with/from the boy/horse/house	marks the instrument of the action; "with", "using", "by", ablative, and perlative marker; "from", "through", "along"	सꣿँ saĩ, सोँ sō̃, सॏँ saĩ, ते tē, त ta
Genitive		-(अ)क (a)k, केर kēr, क/कॆ ka/ke	नेनाक, नेना केर, नेना कॆ nēnāk, nēnā kēr, nēnā ke घोड़ाक, घोड़ा केर, घोड़ा कॆ ghōḍāk, ghōḍā kēr, ghōḍā ke घरक, घर केर, घर कॆ gharak, ghar kēr, ghar ke	boy's of the horse/house	shows possession	कॊ ko, कु ku, करु karu, कहु kahu
Locative		-ए ē	घरे gharē	in the house	shows something is in/on/at something	often used in poetical or
Locative	Inessive	मे mē	नेना मे nēnā mē घोड़ा मे ghōḍā mē घर मे ghar mē	in the boy/horse/house	shows something is in/inside something	मोँ mō̃, मँ^{ऽ} må̃, त ta
Locative	Adessive	पर par	नेना पर nēnā par घोड़ा पर ghōḍā par घर पर ghar par	on the boy/horse/house	shows something is on/at something	पे pē, परि pari/pair

Definiteness is also marked in Maithili using prepositions and postpositions. The accusative marker kē̃ केँ is not used always, it is used in specific conditions-

		Preposition	Postposition	
		Preposition	Accusative	Dative
Animate	Indefinite	∅	+केँ kē̃	-केँ kē̃
Animate	Indefinite specific	एकटा/एक गोट ēk^{a}ṭā/ēk gōṭ(ā)-	+केँ kē̃	-केँ kē̃
Animate	Definite	Demonstratives are used	+केँ kē̃	-केँ kē̃
Inanimate	Indefinite	∅	∅	-केँ kē̃
Inanimate	Indefinite specific	एकटा/एक गोट ēk^{a}ṭā/ēk gōṭ(ā)-	∅	-केँ kē̃
Inanimate	Definite	Demonstratives are used	+केँ kē̃	-केँ kē̃

Some other postpositions are-

Case name		Postposition
Allative		दक daka
Beneficative		लꣿ, ला, लेल, लगि lai, lā, lēl, lagi
Terminative		तक, ला tak, lā
Abessive		बिनु binu
Semblative		जकाँ , सोँ jakā̃, sō̃
Possessive (Note: Used in Old Maithili, and southern dialects.)	Masculine-Neuter object	क꣱, र꣱ kå, rå
Possessive	Feminine object (optional)	कि, रि ki, ri

- Some postpositions are added to the genitive too, and sometimes the genitive inflection is not used at all, except in pronominal inflection.
- Plural is made using postpositions, and also by preposition having a sense of completeness.

	Dual	Plural	
	Dual	Common	Only for honorific and animate
Both post-position and preposition	दुनु dunu, जुग/युग jug/e̯ug, जुगल/युगल jugal/e̯ugal, जोड़ा jōḍā	सभ sabh, सबहि' sabah^{i} (most common plural suffix)	
Only post-position	द्वय dvay	गण gaṇa, आरु' ār^{u}/āur, आरनि ār^{a}ni,	जन jana, लॊकनि lōk^{a}ni, लोक lōk
Only preposition (Note: For pronouns, it is always added as a postposition, and not as a preposition, such as हम सभ ham sabh, and not सभ हम sabh ham.)	दू/दुइ dū/dui	बहुत bahut, बड्ड/ब^{ऽ}ड़ baḍḍ/båḍ, कतेको katēkō	
Post-positions marking completeness	दू/दुइ dū/dui + गो’/गोटा/गोट gō/gōṭā/gōṭ	गो’/गोटा/गोट gō/gōṭā/gōṭ, केओ kēō	लोकनि lōk^{a}ni
Postpositions marking numerals	दू/दुइ dū/dui + गो’/गोटा/गोट gō/gōṭā/gōṭ	गो’/गोटा/गोट gō/gōṭā/gōṭ	

=== Numerals ===
The numeral systems of Maithili like several other Indo-Aryan languages, including Hindustani and Nepali, are typical decimal systems, but contracted to the extent that nearly every number 1–99 is irregular. The first four, and optionally sixth, ordinal numbers are also irregular. The suffix -am marks ordinals five, optionally sixth and seven onwards. The ordinals, whenever they take the long form, decline in the same way as the declinable adjectives. The suffix -gun/gunā (translates as "times" as in multiplying) marks the multipliers which for the first three multipliers changes the numeral root. The collective forms of numerals are formed by adding the suffix -o, with the exception of two, or both. There are two types of adverbials. The first type is formed using the suffix -bārā but only for the numerals 2, 3, and 4 (but it's rarely used for 4). The second type of adverbial is constructed periphrastically using the quantifier bār meaning "times" (as in turns). The adverbial "dubārā" could be translated as "again" or "for a second time", similarly "tebārā" and "caubārā" mean "for a third time" and "for a fourth time" respectively. However, the periphrasatic adverbial constructions "dū bār", "tīn bār" etc. translate as "two times", "three times" etc. respectively.

Numeral	English	Cardinals	Ordinals	Fractions	Aggregates
0	zero	शून्य sūnya (Note: Often transliterated with ⟨ś⟩ rather than ⟨s⟩.)			
1	one	एक ēk	पहिल pahil	पूर pūr	
2	two	दू, दुइ dū, dui	दोसर dōsar	आध ādh	दुनु dunu
3	three	तीन, तीनि' tīn, tīn^{i}	तेसर tēsar	तॆहाई tehāi	तीनु, तीनो tīnu, tīnō
4	four	चारि' cār^{i}	चारिम, चॏठ cārim, cauṭh	चॏठ, चॏथाइ cauth, cauthāi	चारु, चारो cāru, cārō
5	five	पाँच pā̃c	पाँचम pā̃cam		पाँचो pā̃cō
6	six	छॏ chau	छठ, छॏम chaṭh, chaum		छॏओ, छबो chauō, chabō
7	seven	सात sāt	सातम sātam		सातों sātō
8	eight	आठ āṭh	आठम āṭham		आठो āṭhō
9	nine	नॏ nau	नॏम naum		नॏओ, नबो nauō, nabō
10	ten	दश das	दशम dasam		दसो dasō
100	hundred	सꣿ, शत satsai (Note: Often 'sau' is used out of the influence of Hindi.), sat	सꣿअम, सॏअम saiam, sauam		सꣿओ, सॏओ saiō, sauō
1,000	thousand	सहस, सहस्र, हजार sahas, sahasra, hajār	सहसम, हजारम sahasam, hajāram		सहसो, हजारो sahasō, hajārō
100,000	hundred thousand	लाख lākh	लाखम lākham		लाखो lākhō
10,000,000	ten million	करोर, कोटि karōr, kōṭi	करोरम karōram		करोरो karōrō

== Pronoun ==
Pronouns in Maithili are declined in similar way to nominals. However, genetic case has a different form in most of the pronouns.

=== First and Second Person Pronouns ===
Case name	First Person		Second Person		
Case name	Exclusive	Inclusive (Plural only)	Intimate	Honorific	Formal
Nominative	हम ham	Normally Declined अपना सभ ap^{a}nā sabh	तोँह tō̃h	अहाँ ahā̃	Declined Normally अपने ap^{a}nē
Accusative-Dative-Oblique	हमरा ham^{a}ra	Normally Declined अपना सभ ap^{a}nā sabh	तॊहरा/ तोरा tōh^{a}rā/ tōrā	अहाँ केँ ahā̃ kē̃	Declined Normally अपने ap^{a}nē
Instrumental	हमरेँ ham^{a}rē̃	Normally Declined अपना सभ ap^{a}nā sabh	तोहरेँ tōh^{a}rē̃	अहेँ ahē̃	Declined Normally अपने ap^{a}nē
Ergative	हम्मेँ hammē̃	Normally Declined अपना सभ ap^{a}nā sabh	तोएँ/ तोहेँ tōē̃/ tōhē̃	अहेँ ahē̃	Declined Normally अपने ap^{a}nē
Genitive	हमर hamar	अपना सभक ap^{a}na sabh	तोहर/तोर tōhar/ tōr	अहाँक ahā̃k	Declined Normally अपने ap^{a}nē

=== Third Person Pronouns ===
Case name	Correlative/Common			Proximate			Distant		
Case name	First Grade Honour	Neuter	Honorofic	First Grade Honour	Neuter	Honorofic	First Grade Honour	Neuter	Honorofic
Nominative	से sē			ई ī		ए ē, हिनि hini	ऊ ū, वा vā(Non-standard)		ओ ō, हुनि huni
Accusative-Dative-Oblique	तकरा tak^{a}rā	ताहि' tāh^{i}	तनिका tanikā	ऎकरा ek^{a}rā	ऎहि' eh^{i}, अथि athi	हिनका hin^{a}kā	ऒकरा ok^{a}rā	ऒहि' oh^{i}	हुनका hun^{a}kā
Instrumental	तकरेँ tak^{a}rē̃	तेँ tē̃	तनिकेँ tanikē̃	ऎकरेँ ek^{a}rē̃	एँ ē̃, येँ yē̃ (i̯ē̃)	हिनकेँ hin^{a}kē̃	ऒकरेँ ok^{a}rē̃	वेँ/ उएँ wē̃ (u̯ē̃)	हुनकेँ hunkē̃
Ergative	तेँ tē̃			येँ yē̃ (i̯ē̃)	एँ ē̃, येँ yē̃ (i̯ē̃)	येँ yē̃ (i̯ē̃), हिनिँ hinī̃	वेँ/ उएँ wē̃ (u̯ē̃)		
Genitive	तकर takar		तनिक tanik, तनिकर tan^{i}kar	एकर ēkar		हिनकर hin^{a}kar, हिनक hinak	ओकर ōkar		हुनकर hun^{a}kar, हुनक hunak

Case name	Relative			Interrogative			Indefinite	
Case name	First Grade Honour	Neuter	Honorofic	First Grade Honour	Honorofic	Neuter	Non-Neuter	Neuter
Nominative	जे jē			के kē		की kī	कॆऒ keo	किछु' kich^{u}
Accusative-Dative-Oblique	जकरा jak^{a}rā	जाहि' jāh^{i}	जनिका janikā	ककरा kak^{a}rā	कनिका kanikā	कथी kathī Dative- कथी लꣿ/ ला kathī lai/ lā	ककरहुँ' kak^{a}rah^{ũ}	किछु' kich^{u}, कथू kathū
Instrumental	जकरेँ jak^{a}rē̃	जेँ jē̃	जनिकेँ janikē̃	ककरेँ kak^{a}rē̃	कनिकेँ kanikē̃	कथी सँ꣱ kathī så̃	ककरहुँ' सँ꣱ kak^{a}rah^{ũ} så̃	किछु' सँ꣱ kich^{u} så̃, कथू सँ꣱ kathū så̃
Ergative	जेँ jē̃			केँ kē̃		-	-	-
Genitive	जकर jakar		जनिक janik, जनिकर jan^{i}kar	ककर kakar	कनिक kanik, कनिकर kan^{i}kar	कथीक kathīk	ककरो kakarō	किछुक kichuk, कथूक kathūk

== Verbs ==
Conjugation of a transitive verb "कह" /kəɦ/ 'to tell'.

Subject		Object		Present	Past	Future	Imperative	Optative	Conditional	Remote Imperative
First		Object		Present	Past	Future	Imperative	Optative	Conditional	Remote Imperative
First		Second	HON	कही [kəɦiː]	कहली [kəɦəliː]	कहब [kəɦəb]	कहू [kəɦuː]	कही [kəɦiː]	कहितहुँ [kəɦɪtəɦʊ̃]	∅
First		Second	HON	कही [kəɦiː]	कहलहुँ [kəɦᵊləɦʊ̃]	कहब [kəɦəb]	कहू [kəɦuː]	कही [kəɦiː]	कहितहुँ [kəɦɪtəɦʊ̃]	∅
First		Second	Equal	कहिअहु [kəɦɪəɦʊ]	कहलिअहु [kəɦᵊlɪəɦʊ]	कहबहु [kəɦᵊbəɦʊ]	कहिअहु [kəɦɪəɦʊ]	कहिअहु [kəɦɪəɦʊ]	कहितिअहु [kəɦɪtɪəɦʊ]	∅
First		Second	NonHON	कहिऔक [kəɦɪəʊ̯k]	कहलिऔक [kəɦᵊlɪəʊ̯k]	कहबौक [kəɦᵊbəʊ̯k]	कहिऔक [kəɦɪəʊ̯k]	कहिऔक [kəɦɪəʊ̯k]	कहितिऔक [kəɦɪtɪəʊ̯k]	∅
First		Third	HON	कहिअन्हि [kəɦɪəɪ̯nɦ]	कहलिअन्हि [kəɦᵊlɪəɪ̯nɦ]	कहबन्हि [kəɦᵊbəɪ̯nɦ]	कहिऔन्ह् [kəɦɪəʊ̯nɦ]	कहिएन्ह् [kəɦɪeːnɦ]	कहितिऐन्ह् [kəɦɪtɪəɪ̯nɦ]	∅
First		Third	NonHON	कहिऐक [kəɦɪəɪ̯k]	कहलिऐक [kəɦᵊlɪəɪ̯k]	कहबैक [kəɦᵊbəɪ̯k]	कहिऔक [kəɦɪəʊ̯k]	कहिऐक [kəɦɪəɪ̯k]	कहितिऐक [kəɦɪtɪəɪ̯k]	∅
Second	HON	First		कही [kəɦiː]	कहली [kəɦᵊliː]	कहब [kəɦəb]	कहू [kəɦuː]	कही [kəɦiː]	कहितहुँ [kəɦɪtəɦʊ̃]	∅
Second	HON	First		कही [kəɦiː]	कहलहुँ [kəɦᵊləɦʊ̃]	कहब [kəɦəb]	कहू [kəɦuː]	कही [kəɦiː]	कहितहुँ [kəɦɪtəɦʊ̃]	∅
Second	HON	Third	HON	कहिअन्हि [kəɦɪəɪ̯nɦ]	कहलिअन्हि [kəɦᵊlɪəɪ̯nɦ]	कहबन्हि [kəɦᵊbəɪ̯nɦ]	कहिऔन्ह् [kəɦɪəʊ̯nɦ]	कहिऐन्ह् [kəɦɪəɪ̯nɦ]	कहितिऐक [kəɦɪtɪəɪ̯k]	∅
Second	HON	Third	NonHON	कहिऐक [kəɦɪəɪ̯k]	कहलिऐक [kəɦᵊlɪəɪ̯k]	कहबैक [kəɦᵊbəɪ̯k]	कहिऔक [kəɦɪəʊ̯k]	कहिऐक [kəɦɪəɪ̯k]	कहितह [kəɦɪtəɦ]	∅
Second	Equal	First		कहह [kəɦəɦ]	कहलह [kəɦᵊləɦ]	कहबह [kəɦᵊbəɦ]	कहह [kəɦəɦ]	कहह [kəɦəɦ]	कहितहुन्हु [kəɦɪtəɦʊnɦ]	कहिहह [kəɦɪɦəɦ]
Second	Equal	Third	HON	कहुन्ह् [kəɦʊnɦ]	कहलहुन्ह् [kəɦᵊləɦʊnɦ]	कहबहुन्ह् [kəɦᵊbəɦʊnɦ]	कहुन्ह् [kəɦʊnɦ]	कहुन्ह् [kəɦʊnɦ]	कहितहिक [kəɦɪtəɦɪk]	कहिहौन्ह् [kəɦɪɦəʊ̯nɦ]
Second	Equal	Third	NONHON	कहक [kəɦək]	कहलहक [kəɦᵊləɦək]	कहबहक [kəɦᵊbəɦək]	कहक [kəɦək]	कहक [kəɦək]	∅	कहिहक [kəɦɪɦək]
Second	NonHON	First		कहें [kəɦeː]	कहलें [kəɦᵊleː]	कहबें [kəɦᵊbeː]	कह [kəɦ]	कह‍हिं [kəɦəɦɪ̃]	∅	कह‍हिं [kəɦəɦɪ̃]
Second	NonHON	Third	HON	कहुन्ह् [kəɦʊnɦ]	कहलहुन्ह् [kəɦᵊləɦʊnɦ]	कहबहुन्ह् [kəɦᵊbəɦʊnɦ]	कहुन्ह् [kəɦʊnɦ]	कहुनह् [kəɦʊnəɦ]	∅	कहिहौन्ह् [kəɦɪɦəʊ̯nɦ]
Second	NonHON	Third	NonHON	कहिक [kəɦɪk]	कहलहीक [kəɦᵊləɦiːk]	कहबहीक [kəɦᵊbəɦiːk]	कहीक [kəɦiːk]	कहीक [kəɦiːk]	कहितथि [kəɦɪtəɪ̯tʰ]	कहिहक [kəɦɪɦək]
Third	HON	First		कह‍थि [kəɦəɪ̯tʰ]	कहलन्हि [kəɦᵊləɪ̯nɦ]	कहताह [kəɦᵊtaːɦ]	कह‍थु [kəɦəʊ̯tʰ]	कहाथि [kəɦaːɪtʰ]	कहितथि [kəɦɪtəɪ̯tʰ]	∅
Third	HON	First		कह‍थि [kəɦəɪ̯tʰ]	कहलन्हि [kəɦᵊləɪ̯nɦ]	कहतीह [kəɦᵊtiːɦ]	कह‍थु [kəɦəʊ̯tʰ]	कहाथि [kəɦaːɪtʰ]	कहितथि [kəɦɪtəɪ̯tʰ]	∅
Third	HON	Second	HON	कह‍थि [kəɦəɪ̯tʰ]	कहलनि [kəɦᵊləɪ̯n]	कहताह [kəɦᵊtaːɦ]	कह‍थु [kəɦəʊ̯tʰ]	कहाथि [kəɦaːɪtʰ]	कहिथुन्ह् [kəɦɪtʰʊnɦ]	∅
Third	HON	Second	Equal	कहथुन्ह् [kəɦᵊtʰʊnɦ]	कहलनि [kəɦᵊləɪ̯n]	कहथुन्ह् [kəɦᵊtʰʊnɦ]	कहथुन्ह् [kəɦᵊtʰʊnɦ]	कहथुन्ह् [kəɦᵊtʰʊnɦ]	कहिथुन्ह् [kəɦɪtʰʊnɦ]	∅
Third	HON	Second	NonHON	कहथुन्ह् [kəɦᵊtʰʊnɦ]	कहलथुन्ह् [kəɦᵊlətʰʊnɦ]	कहथुन्ह् [kəɦᵊtʰʊnɦ]	कहथुन्ह् [kəɦᵊtʰʊnɦ]	कहथुन्ह् [kəɦᵊtʰʊnɦ]	कहितथिन्हु [kəɦɪtətʰɪʊnɦ]	∅
Third	HON	Third	HON	कहथिन्ह् [kəɦᵊtʰɪnɦ]	कहलथिन्ह् [kəɦᵊlətʰɪnɦ]	कहथिन्ह् [kəɦᵊtʰɪnɦ]	कहथुन्ह् [kəɦᵊtʰʊnɦ]	कहथुन्ह् [kəɦᵊtʰʊnɦ]	कहितए [kəɦɪtəeː]	∅
Third	HON	Third	HON	कहथिन्ह् [kəɦᵊtʰɪnɦ]	कहलथिन्ह् [kəɦᵊlətʰɪnɦ]	कहथिन्ह् [kəɦᵊtʰɪnɦ]	कहथुन्ह् [kəɦᵊtʰʊnɦ]	कहथुन्ह् [kəɦᵊtʰʊnɦ]	कहैत [kəɦəɪ̯t]	
Third	HON	Third	NonHON	कहथिन्ह् [kəɦᵊtʰɪnɦ]	कहलथिन्ह् [kəɦᵊlətʰɪnɦ]	कहथिन्ह् [kəɦᵊtʰɪnɦ]	कहथुह [kəɦᵊtʰʊɦ]	कहथुह [kəɦᵊtʰʊɦ]	कहितए [kəɦɪtəeː]	
Third	HON	Third	NonHON	कहथिन्ह् [kəɦᵊtʰɪnɦ]	कहलथिन्ह् [kəɦᵊlətʰɪnɦ]	कहथिन्ह् [kəɦᵊtʰɪnɦ]	कहथुह [kəɦᵊtʰʊɦ]	कहथुह [kəɦᵊtʰʊɦ]	कहैत [kəɦəɪ̯t]	∅
Third	NonHON	First		कहए [kəɦəeː]	कहलक [kəɦᵊlək]	कहत [kəɦət]	कहऒ [kəɦɔ]	कहऒ [kəɦɔ]	कहितहु [kəɦɪtəɦʊ]	∅
Third	NonHON	Second	HON	कहए [kəɦəeː]	कहलक [kəɦᵊlək]	कहत [kəɦət]	कहऒ [kəɦɔ]	कहऒ [kəɦɔ]	कहितहु [kəɦɪtəɦʊ]	∅
Third	NonHON	Second	Equal	कहहु [kəɦəɦʊ]	कहलकहु [kəɦᵊləkəɦʊ]	कहतहु [kəɦᵊtəɦʊ]	कहहु [kəɦᵊɦʊ]	कहहु [kəɦᵊɦʊ]	कहितौक [kəɦɪtəʊ̯k]	∅
Third	NonHON	Second	NonHON	कहौक [kəɦəʊ̯k]	कहलकौक [kəɦᵊləkəʊ̯k]	कहतौक [kəɦᵊtəʊ̯k]	कहौक [kəɦəʊ̯k]	कहौक [kəɦəʊ̯k]	कहितन्हि [kəɦɪtəɪ̯nɦ]	∅
Third	NonHON	Third	HON	कहन्हि [kəɦəɪ̯nɦ]	कहलकन्हि [kəɦᵊləkəɪ̯nɦ]	कहतनि [kəɦᵊtəɪ̯n]	कहौन्ह् [kəɦəʊ̯nɦ]	कहैन्ह् [kəɦəɪ̯nɦ]	कहितैक [kəɦɪtəɪ̯k]	∅
Third	NonHON	Third	NonHON	कहैक [kəɦəɪ̯k]	कहलकैक [kəɦᵊləkəɪ̯k]	कहतैक [kəɦətəɪ̯k]	कहौक [kəɦəʊ̯k]	कहौक [kəɦəʊ̯k]		∅
