= Anicet =

Anicet may refer to:

== People with the forename ==
- Anicet Abel (born 1990), Malagasy football player
- Anicet Adjamossi (born 1984), Beninese football player
- Anicet Brodavski (born 1944), Lithuanian politician
- Anicet-Georges Dologuélé (born 1957), Central African politician
- Anicet "AJ" Dybantsa (born 2007), American basketball player
- Anicet Eyenga (born 1986), Cameroonian football player
- Anicet Kopliński (1875–1941), Polish friar
- Anicet Lavodrama (born 1963), Central African basketball player
- Anicet Le Pors (born 1931), French politician
- Anicet Charles Gabriel Lemonnier (1743–1824), French painter
- Anicet Oura (born 1999), Ivorian football player
- Anicet Rasoanaivo (born 1969), Malagasy boxer
- Anicet Turinay (born 1945), French politician

== People with the surname ==
- Oussou Konan Anicet (born 1989), Ivorian football player
- Pascal Anicet (born 1983), Nigerian football player
- Auguste Anicet-Bourgeois (1806–1871), French playwright

== Location ==
- Saint-Anicet, municipality in Canada

== See also ==
- Anicetus (disambiguation), Latin form of the name
