= Ankit Sharma =

Ankit Sharma may refer to:

- Ankit Sharma (footballer) (born 1991), Indian footballer
- Ankit Sharma (cricketer) (born 1991), Indian cricketer
- Ankit Sharma (athlete) (born 1992), Indian athlete (long jumper)
