= Anicetus (freedman) =

Freedman and tutor of the Roman emperor Nero

- Anicetus leading the assassins against Agrippina
- Known for: freedman of the Roman emperor Nero

Anicetus was a freedman of the Roman emperor Nero, who – along with the freedman Beryllus – tutored the young emperor.

After tutoring Nero, Anicetus was made commander of the fleet (praefectus classis) at Misenum in 59 AD. He was later employed by the emperor to murder Nero's own mother, Agrippina the Younger. Nero wished to see his mother crushed in a collapsing boat, and employed Anicetus to see to it that this contraption was built. Nero put this strategy into action, though the collapsing boat failed to kill Agrippina. Afterwards, on 23 March AD 59, Anicetus himself stabbed Agrippina to death in her villa, on orders from Nero.

Anicetus was subsequently induced by Nero to confess having committed adultery with Nero's wife, Claudia Octavia. As punishment, Octavia was banished and died after immense suffering. For his supposed part in this crime, Anicetus was banished to Sardinia, where he lived in comfortable exile until his death of old age.

== See also ==
- Anicetus (pirate), possibly the same person
