= Rajpara State (Halar) =

Indian village, in Gujarat

Coordinates: 22.3621°N 69.1092°E

Rajpara (originally Rajpura) is a village and former Hindu non-salute Rajput princely state (native state) on Saurashtra peninsula in Gujarat, western India.

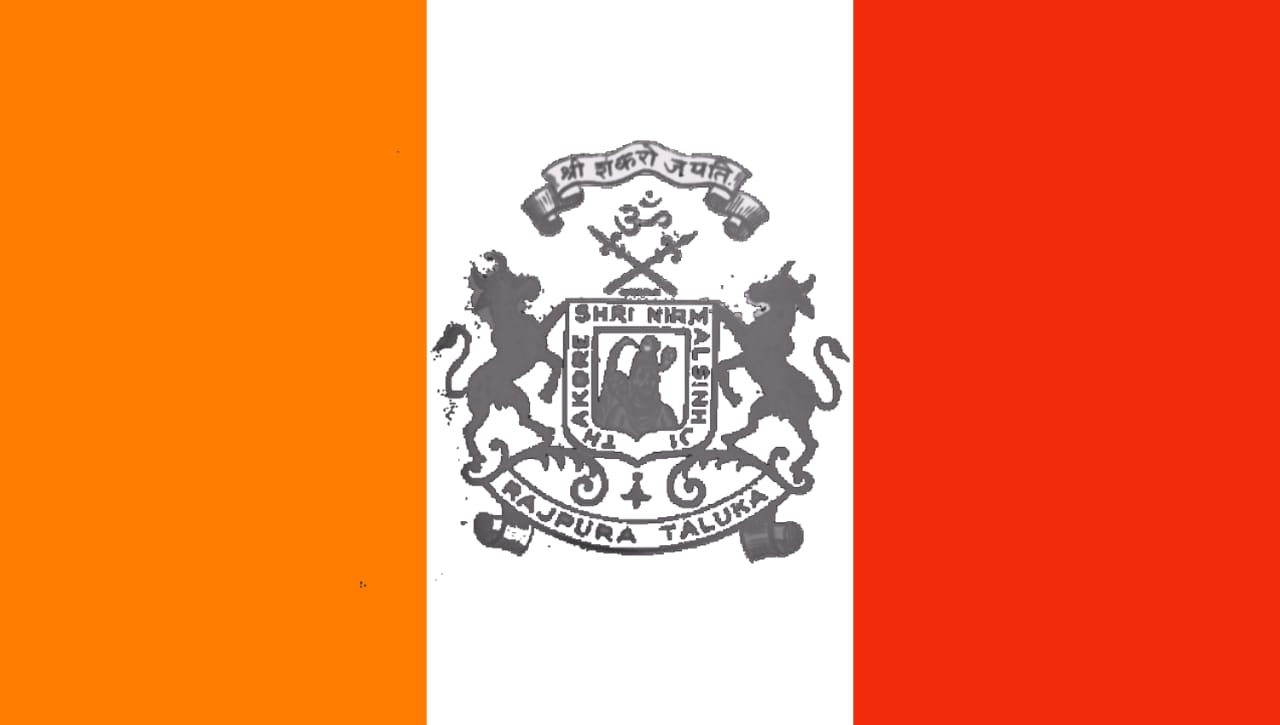
Coat of arms of Rajpura (Halar)

== History ==
The Fifth Class Non-Salute Princely state and taluka, in Halar prant, was ruled by Jadeja Rajput Chieftains by primogeniture. It is an offshoot of the Kotda-Sangani State, whose first Thakur (title) Togujiraj, the founder of the house, the second son of Sangoji of Kotda-Sangani, received in appanage (jagir) with some other villages.

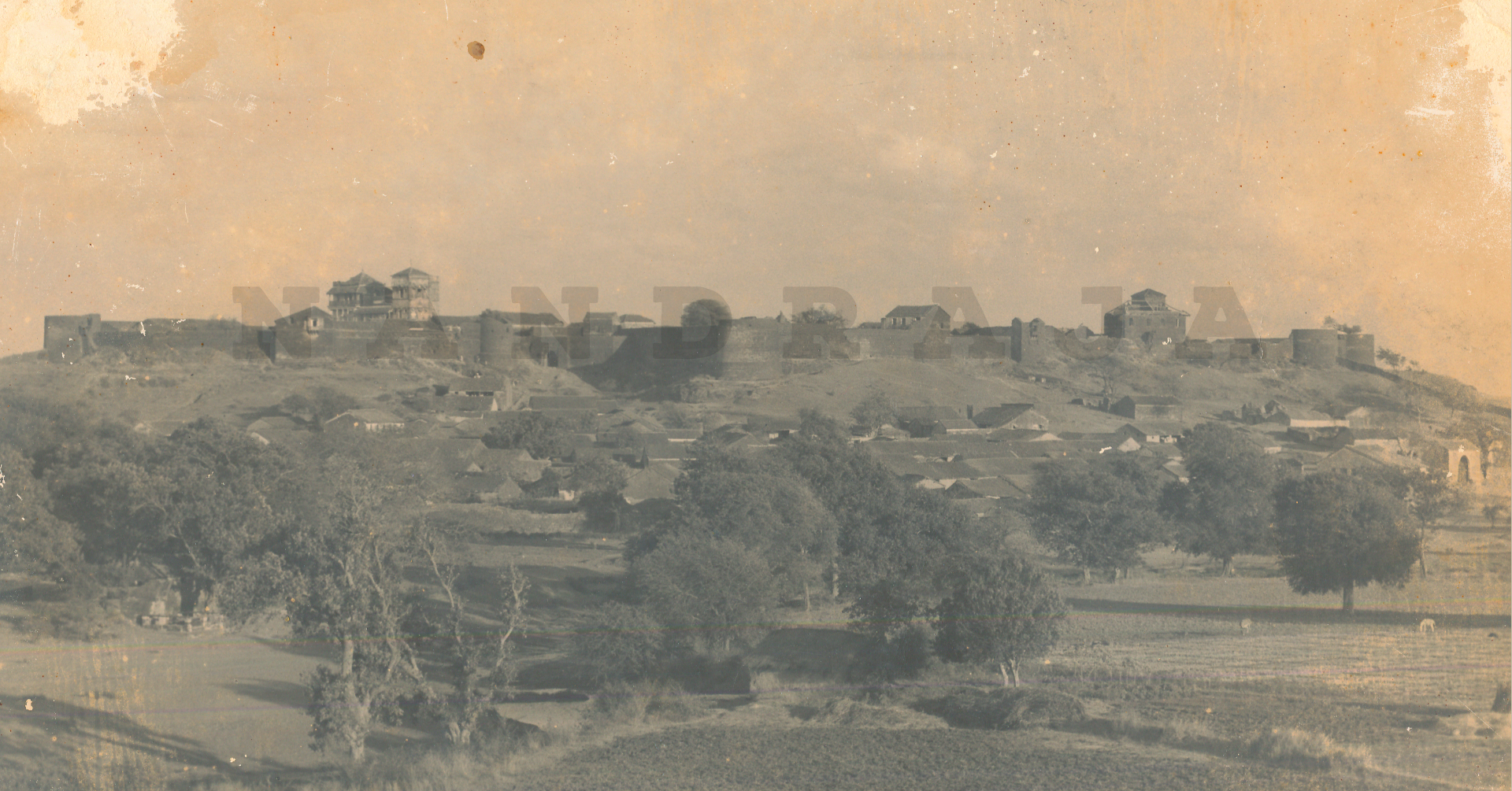
The Rajpura fort.

In 1901 it comprised twelve more villages, covering 39 square kilometers, with a combined population of 1,862 in 1901 (2,268 in 1921), yielding 13,654 Rupees state revenue (1903-4, mostly from land; later 27,000 Rs), paying 3,163 Rupees tribute, to the British and Junagadh State.

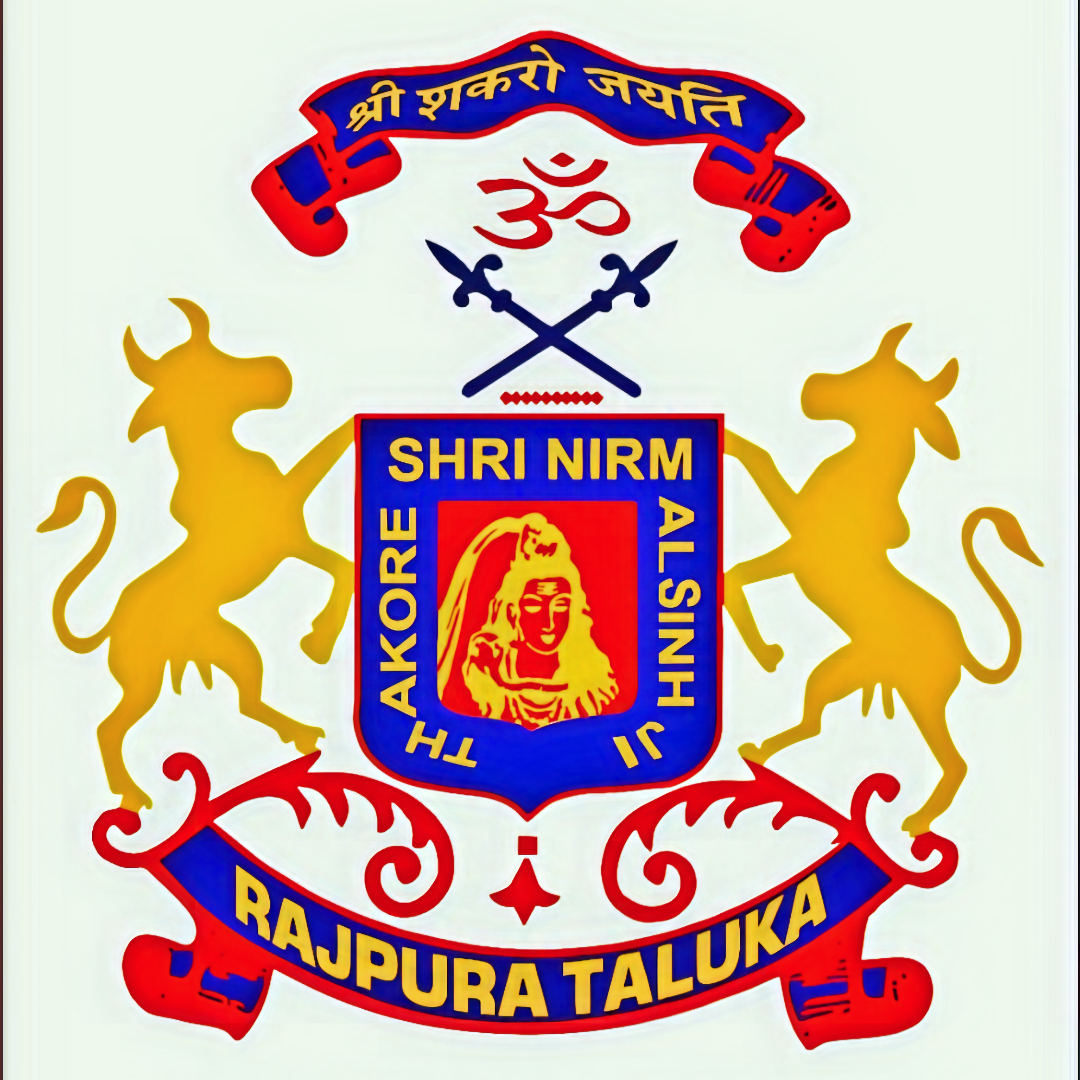
The Emblem of Rajpura

The Rajpura housed one of the most elegant houses in its time, the royal house, Rangmahel, having a scenic landscape surrounding itself, also served as the administrative office of the Taluka Rajpura.

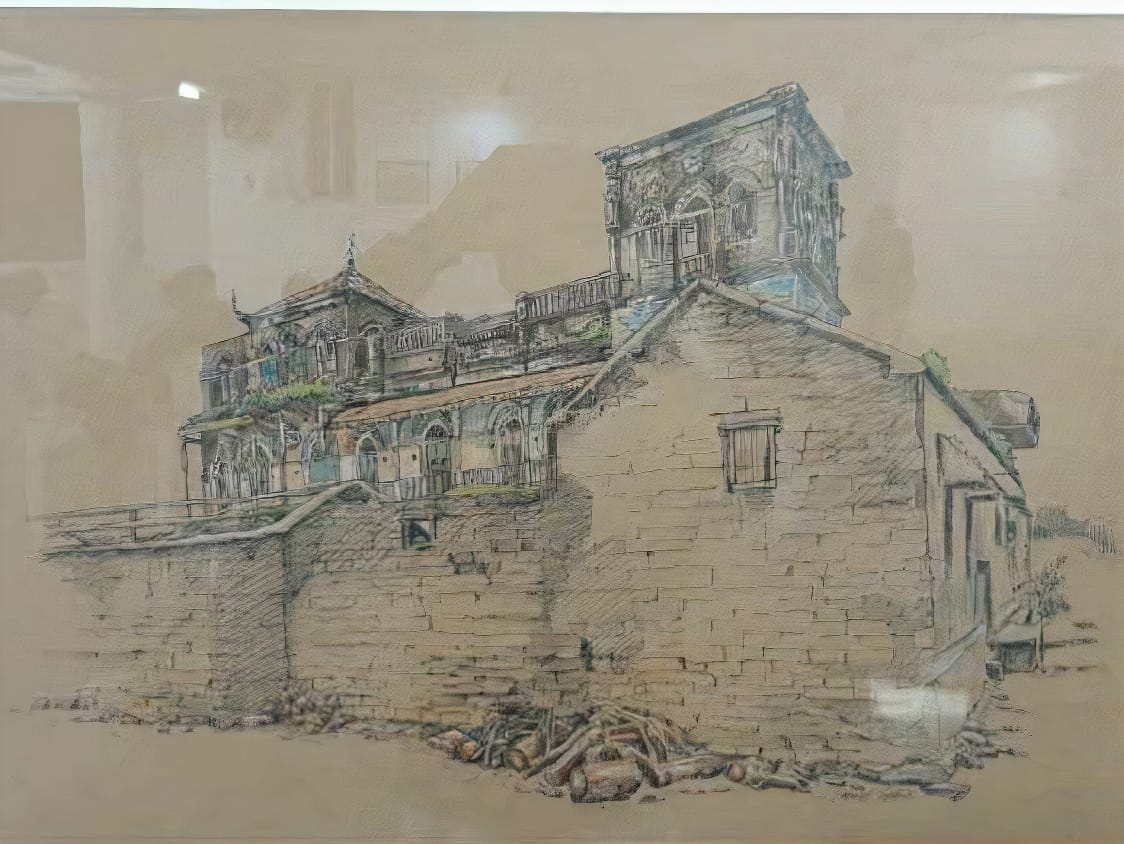
The Rangmahel

== Thakurs ==
- Togujiraj Sangojiraj [Togaji], first Thakur
- Merujiraj Togujiraj, son of the above
- Asajiraj Merujiraj, son of the above
- Ladhajiraj Asajiraj, son of the above
- Waghjiraj Ladhajiraj, son of the above, died childless
- Bhimjiraj Ladhajiraj, brother of the above, -/1884
- Asajiraj Bhimjiraj, born 1846, son of Bhimjiraj Ladhajiraj, succeeded 25 April 1884

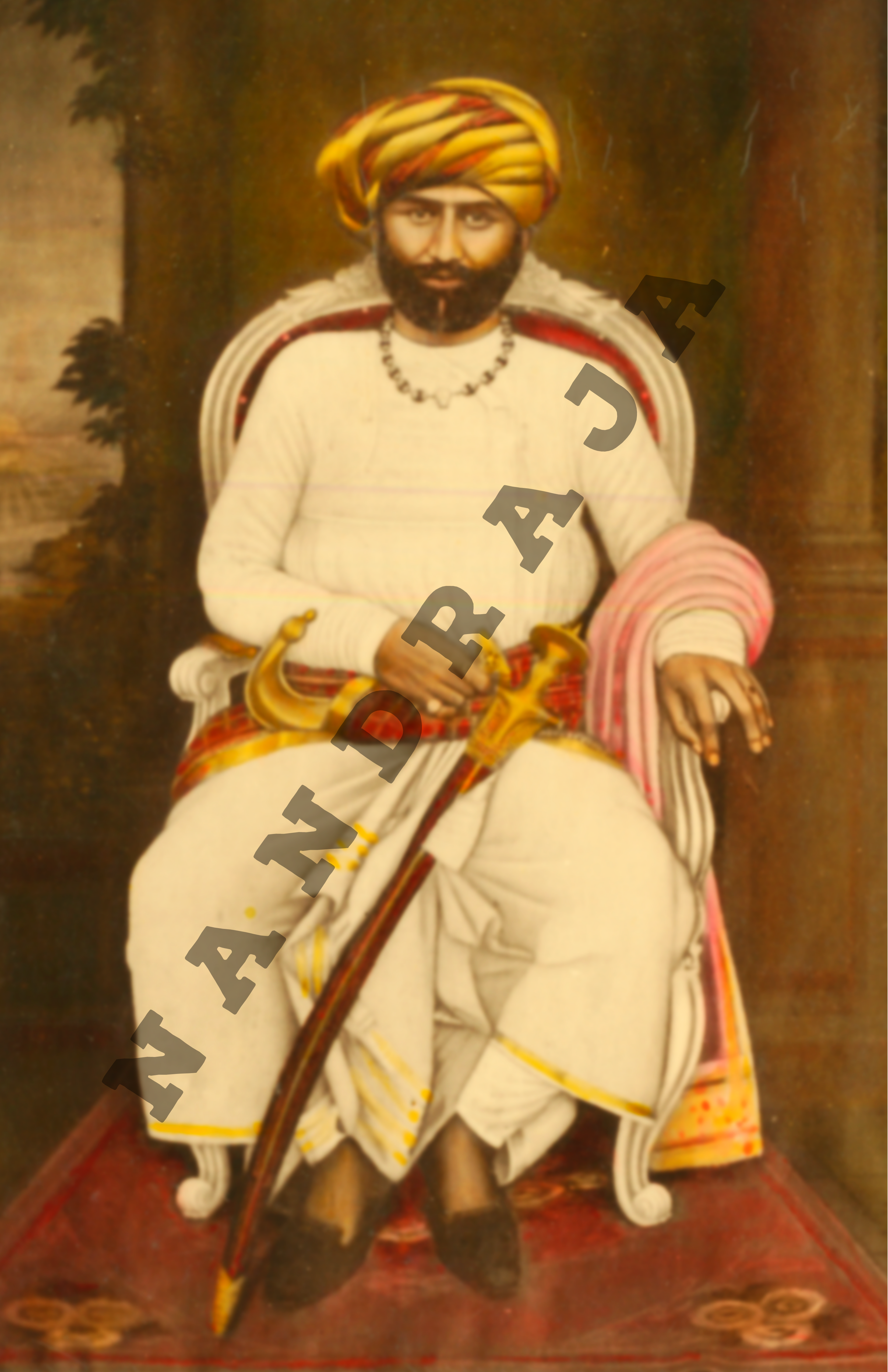
T.S. Asājiraj Bhimjiraj Jadeja

- Lakhajiraj Asajiraj, born 30 July 1869, son of the above, succeeded 27 December 1903

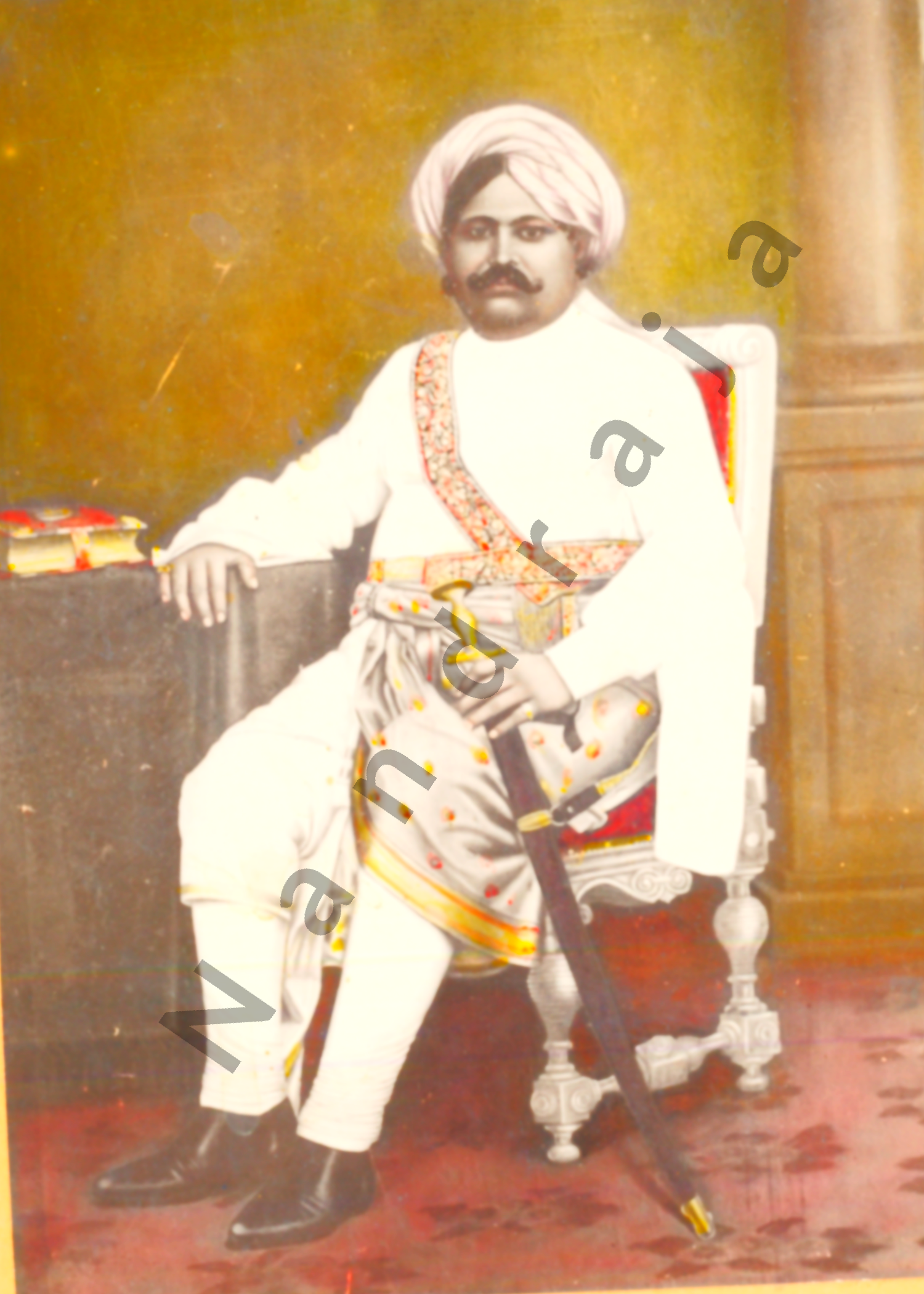
T.S. Lakhajiraj Asājiraj Jadeja

- Prithvirajsinhji Lakhajiraj, son of above, succeeded throne in 1913

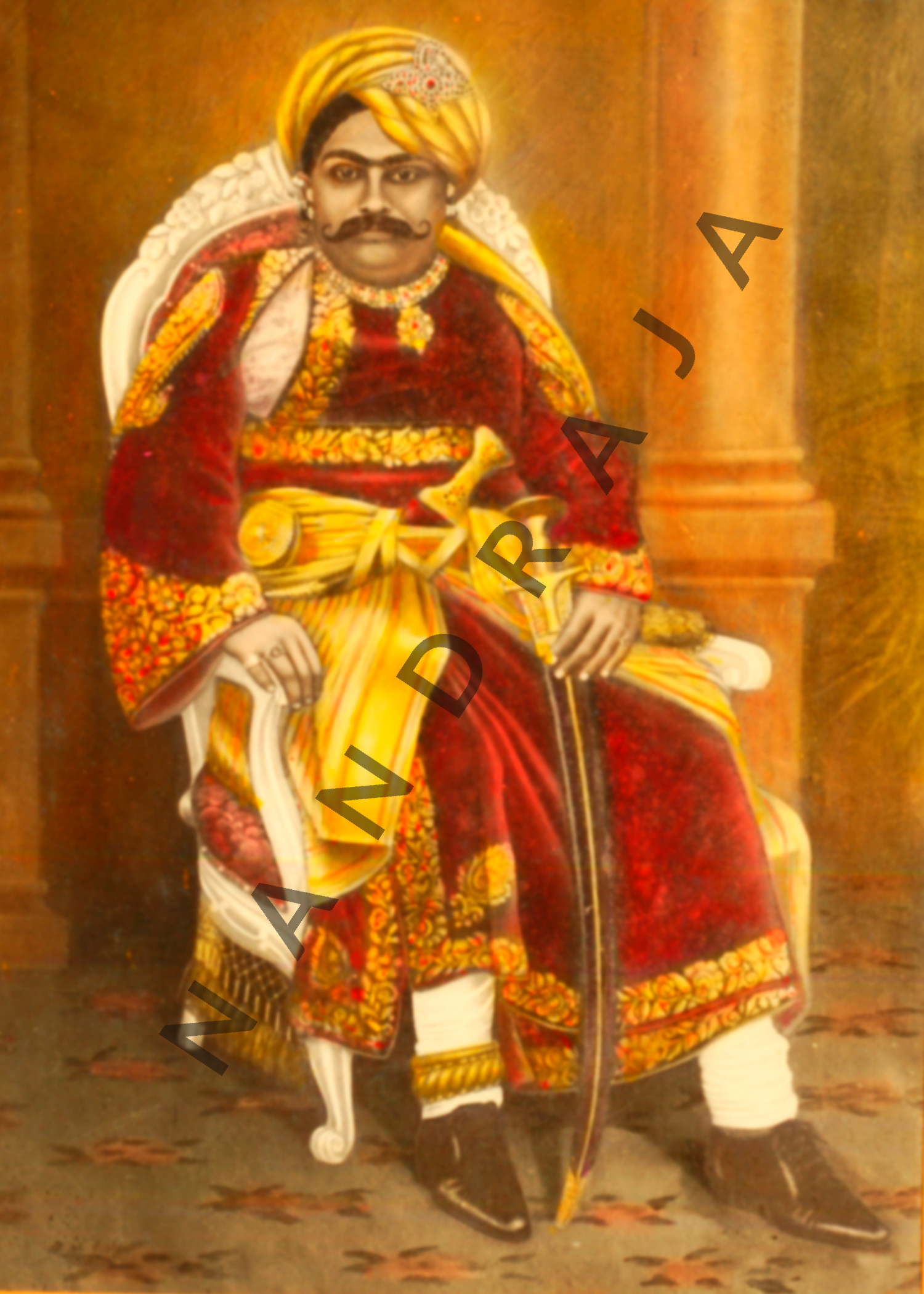
T.S. Prithviraj Lakhajiraj Jadeja

- Nirmalsinhji Prithvirajsinhji, grandson of the above (son of Yuvraj Saheb Prithvirajji Lakhajiraj)
- Present Rajvijaysinhji Shivbhadrasinhji, born on 9 March 1966 grandson of the above (son of Yuvraj Saheb Shivbhadrasinhji Nirmalsinhji)
- Present Yuvrajsaheb Kirtirajsinhji Rajvijaysinhji Jadeja, born 4 September 1991(son of above)
- Present Tikkasaheb Yadoksharajsinhji Kirtirajsinhji Jadeja, born 7 November 2021 (son of above)

== See also ==
- Rajpara State (Gohelwar)

== External links and sources ==
History

- Imperial Gazetteer, on DSAL.UChicago.edu - Kathiawar
- Indian Princely States on web.archive.org
