= Ankita =

Ankita is a given Indian female name (Sanskrit: अङ्किता, romanized: Aṅkitā, lit. 'marked'). It is also the feminine counterpart of Ankit. As with any adjective in the language, it can take on a nominal form. The word is often used in many Asian countries, atypically because of its extended meaning as "one with auspicious signs/engraving".

== Notable people named Ankita ==
- Ankita Bhakat (born June 17, 1998), Indian recurve archer.
- Ankita Bhambri (born October 28, 1986), Indian former professional tennis player.
- Ankita Lokhande (born December 19, 1981), Indian actress.
- Ankita Makwana (born May 29, 1987), Swiss-Indian actress, model, producer, speaker and writer.
- Ankita Bhargava Patel (born August 17, 1984), Indian television actress.
- Ankita Raina (born January 11, 1993), Indian professional tennis player.
- Ankita Mayank Sharma (born February 7, 1987), Indian model and television actress.
- Ankita Shorey (born October 3, 1992), Indian model and Femina Miss India International 2011 contest winner.
- Ankita Jhaveri (born May 27), Indian actress.

== See also ==
- Ankit, male form of this name
