= Anicet Le Pors =

French politician

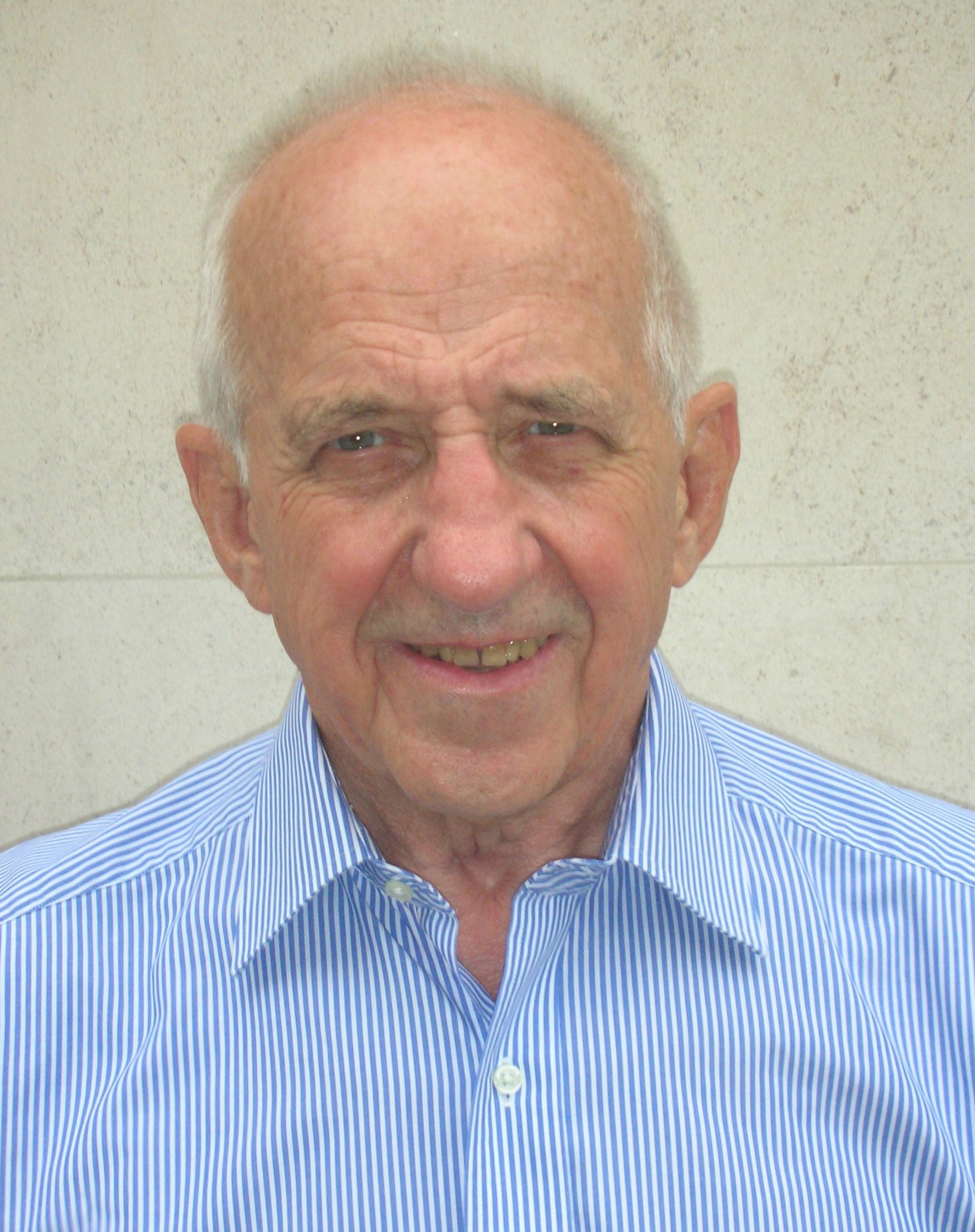
- Anicet Le Pors in 2007
- Born: 28 April 1931 (age 95); Paris, France
- Education: Meteorologist
- Occupation: Politician
- Political party: French Communist Party

Anicet Le Pors (born 28 April 1931) is a French politician. Formed as an engineer in meteorology working for the Météorologie nationale (Météo-France), he served as a member of the French Senate from 1977 to 1981. He served as the Minister of Civil Service and Reforms from 1981 to 1984. He became a Commander of the Legion of Honour on 13 July 2016.
