= Rajpara State (Gohelwar) =

Village in Gujarat, India

Rajpara is a village and former non-salute Rajput princely state on Saurashtra peninsula in Gujarat, western India.

== History ==
The petty princely state in Gohelwar Prant, was ruled by Sarvaiya Rajput Chieftains. In 1901, it comprised a single village, with a population of 552, yielding 2,150 Rupees state revenue (1903–4, nearly all from land), paying 274 Rupees tribute, to the Gaikwar Baroda State and Junagadh State.

== See also ==
- Rajpara State (Halar)
