= Anicetus (pirate) =

Leader of anti-Roman uprising in Colchis (AD 69)

- Died: 69; Lazica
- Piratical career
- Years active: fl. 69
- Rank: Captain
- Base of operations: Black Sea

Anicetus was the leader of an unsuccessful anti-Roman uprising in Colchis in 69 AD. He claimed to be acting on behalf of Vitellius, and destroyed a cohort and part of the Roman fleet stationed at Trapezus. The revolt was put down by the Roman reinforcements under Virdius Geminus, a lieutenant of Vespasian. Overtaken at the mouth of the river Chobus (now the Enguri River), Anicetus was surrendered to the Romans by the local tribesmen, and executed.

According to Tacitus, the only ancient source to mention him, Anicetus had been a freedman of King Polemon II of Pontus, and had commanded the royal fleet. In 64 AD, the Kingdom of Pontus had become a Roman province, and Tacitus implies that Anicetus' rebellion was motivated by his desire to free Pontus from Roman rule. However, David Woods argues that Anicetus should in fact be identified with the prefect of the fleet at Misenum who shared the name, and who was involved in Nero's murder of his mother, Agrippina. Woods argues that his actions were therefore not those of someone fighting for independence from Rome, but of a Roman hoping to secure a position of power by supporting the Vitellian faction in the civil war which followed the death of Nero.
