= Schwa deletion in Indo-Aryan languages =

Phonetic process

The IPA symbol for the schwa

Schwa deletion, or schwa syncope, is a phenomenon that sometimes occurs in Assamese, Hindustani (Hindi-Urdu), Bengali, Kashmiri, Punjabi, Gujarati, and several other Indo-Aryan languages with schwas that are implicit in their written scripts. Languages like Marathi and Maithili with increased influence from other languages through coming into contact with them also show a similar phenomenon. Some schwas are obligatorily deleted in pronunciation even if the script suggests otherwise. Here, schwa refers to an inherent vowel in the respective abugida scripts, not necessarily pronounced as schwa (the mid central vowel [ə]).

Schwa deletion is important for intelligibility and unaccented speech. It also presents a challenge to non-native speakers and speech synthesis software because the scripts, including Devanagari, do not indicate when schwas should be deleted.

For example, the Sanskrit word "Rāma" (IPA: [raːmɐ], राम) is pronounced "Rām" (IPA: [raːm], राम्) in Hindi. The schwa (ə) sound at the end of the word is deleted in Hindi. However, in both cases, the word is written राम.

== Overview ==
The schwa is not deleted in ancient languages such as Sanskrit, as well as the modern registers of the Odia and Sinhala languages. The schwa is also retained in all the Dravidian languages – such as Tamil, Telugu, Tulu, Kannada, and Malayalam – since they are not part of the Indo-Aryan language family. According to Masica (1993), there has been not "any attempt to deal with it [schwa deletion] (and medial vowel loss in general) in systematic fashion either descriptively or historically across all NIA [New Indo-Aryan] languages."

Languages	Mid schwa deletion	Final schwa deletion
Assamese	Retains	Sometimes
Bengali	Sometimes	Sometimes
Gujarati	Sometimes	Deletes
Hindi	Sometimes	Deletes
Kashmiri	Deletes	Deletes
Marathi	Sometimes	Sometimes
Nepali	Retains	Sometimes
Odia	Retains	Retains
Punjabi	Sometimes	Deletes
Sanskrit	Retains	Retains
Sinhala	Retains	Retains
Urdu	Deletes	Deletes

== Schwa deletion ==
Different Indian languages can differ in how they apply schwa deletion. For instance, medial schwas from Sanskrit-origin words are often retained in Bengali even if they are deleted in Hindi. An example of this is रचना/রচনা which is pronounced racanā (/rɐtɕɐnaː/) in Sanskrit, racnā ((/rətʃnɑː/) in Hindi and rôcona ((/rɔtʃona/) in Bengali. While the medial schwa is deleted in Hindi (because of the ə → ∅ / VC_CV rule), it is retained in Bengali.

On the other hand, the final schwa in वेद/বেদ is deleted in both Hindi and Bengali (Sanskrit: [/ʋeːd̪ə/], Hindi: [/ʋeːd̪/], Bengali: [/bed̪/]).

=== Assamese ===
The Assamese equivalent for schwa is the open-mid back rounded vowel or [ɔ]. Assamese deleted this vowel at the end of consonant-final words, with a few exceptions such as numerals. In clusters, it is deleted in words like কান্ধ (/kandʱ-/, 'shoulder'), বান্ধ (/bandʱ-/, 'bond') while optional in the word গোন্ধ (/ɡʊnˈdʱ(ɔ)/, 'smell'). Modern Standard Assamese developed the schwa in words like কাছ (/kaˈsɒ/, 'turtle'), পাৰ (/paˈɹɒ/, 'pigeon'), তই কৰ (/tɔi kɔɹɔ/, 'you do') which appear with different vowels in some other dialects, like কাছু /ˈkasu/, পাৰা /ˈpaɾa/, কৰাহ /ˈkɔɾaʱ/ in some Kamrupi dialects. Eastern (and its sub-dialect, Standard) and Central Assamese retained the schwa in medial positions, like নিজৰা (/niˈzɔɹa/, 'stream'), বিচনি (/biˈsɔni/, 'handfan'), বতৰা (/bɔˈtɔɹa/, 'news'), পাহৰে (/paˈɦɔɹe/, 'forgets'), নকৰে (/nɔˈkɔɹe/, 'doesn't do'), which were deleted in some of the Kamrupi dialect, while some others kept them as /a/. Conjuncts in Sanskrit loanwords always have the schwa, and in consonants ending words (that are followed by schwa), the schwa is optionally present in words ending with suffixes, for example, শিক্ষিত from Sanskrit शिक्षित (śikṣita, 'educated') is pronounced both as /ˌxikˈkʰitɔ/ and /ˌxikˈkʰit/.

=== Bengali ===
The Bengali equivalent for schwa is the open-mid back rounded vowel [ɔ]. In open non-initial syllables, in syllables following an /ä/ or another /ɔ/, and in syllables preceding an /i/ or /u/, it is raised to close-mid [o].

Word-final schwa is generally deleted, unless preceded by a consonant cluster or an /h/. For example, Sanskrit পথ (/pɐt̪ʰɐ/, 'way') becomes Bengali /pɔt̪ʰ/, while অন্ত (/ɐnt̪ɐ/, 'end') and গ্রহ (/grɐɦɐ/, 'planet') retain the final schwa and become /ɔn.t̪o/ and /gro.ho/, respectively. However, tatsamas often retain the final schwa after certain suffixes, in some unnaturalized bisyllabic words and in the first part of compounds.

Word-medial schwa is generally deleted only when it precedes an open syllable in polysyllabic words. For example, ঢাকনা ('cover') is now pronounced /ɖʱäk.nä/, where the medial schwa was lost as the next syllable is open. However, this deletion does not occur before or after consonant clusters, and, again, unnaturalized tatsamas resist it.

=== Gujarati ===
Gujarati has a strong schwa deletion phenomenon, affecting both medial and final schwas. From an evolutionary perspective, the final schwas appear to have been lost prior to the medial ones. According to Cardona, the word-final schwa deletion occurred during the transition from Middle Gujarati to Modern Gujarati.

=== Hindustani (Hindi-Urdu) ===
Although the Devanagari script is used as a standard to write Hindi, the schwa (/ə/) implicit in each consonant of the script is "obligatorily deleted" at the end of words and in certain other contexts, unlike in Sanskrit. That phenomenon has been termed the "schwa syncope rule" or the "schwa deletion rule" of Hindi. One formalisation of this rule has been summarised as ə → ∅ /VC_CV. In other words, when a schwa-succeeded consonant (itself preceded by another vowel) is followed by a vowel-succeeded consonant, the schwa inherent in the first consonant is deleted. However, this rule sometimes deletes a schwa that should remain and sometimes fails to delete a schwa when it should be deleted. The rule is reported to result in correct predictions on schwa deletion 89% of the time.

Schwa deletion is computationally important because it is essential to building text-to-speech software for Hindi.

As a result of schwa syncope, the Hindi pronunciation of many words differs from that expected from a literal Sanskrit-style reading of Devanagari. For instance, राम is pronounced Rām (not Rāma, as in Sanskrit), रचना is pronounced Rachnā (not Rachanā), and वेद is pronounced Vēd (not Vēda). The name of the script itself is pronounced Dēvnāgrī, not Dēvanāgarī.

Correct schwa deletion is also critical because the same letter sequence is pronounced two different ways in Hindi depending on the context. Failure to delete the appropriate schwas can then change the meaning. For instance, the letter sequence ⟨रक⟩ is pronounced differently in हरकत (har.kat, meaning 'movement' or 'activity') and सरकना (sarak.na, meaning 'to slide'). Similarly, the sequence ⟨धड़कने⟩ in दिल धड़कने लगा ('the heart started beating') and in दिल की धड़कनें ('beats of the heart') is identical prior to the nasalisation in the second usage. However, it is pronounced dhaṛak.nē in the first and dhaṛ.kanē̃ in the second. While in the word नमक the final schwa is deleted, making it Namak and not Namaka, the similarly spelt word नमकीन is pronounced Namkīn, also dropping the schwa in between the m and k.

While native speakers pronounce the sequences differently in different contexts, non-native speakers and voice-synthesis software can make them "sound very unnatural", making it "extremely difficult for the listener" to grasp the intended meaning.

=== Kashmiri ===
In the Dardic subbranch, Kashmiri similarly demonstrates schwa deletion. For instance, drākṣa (द्राक्ष) is the Sanskrit word for grape, but the final schwa is dropped in the Kashmiri version, which is dach (दछ् / دَچھ).

This pattern extends beyond Sanskrit borrowings and is observable in everyday vocabulary when compared with other modern Indo-Aryan languages. In Hindustani (Hindi-Urdu), the word kēlā (केला / کیلا 'banana') retains the final (to some extent, as well as medial) vowel -ā and a respectively, while in Kashmiri the same word undergoes both medial as well as final schwa deletion, surfacing as kēl (केल् / کیل). Similarly, Hindustani santarā (संतरा / سنترا 'orange') preserves the final vowel, whereas Kashmiri deletes it, resulting in saṅgtar (संगतर् / سَنٛگتر). Such examples illustrate that Kashmiri exhibits more extensive and regular schwa deletion than many neighboring Indo-Aryan languages, contributing to its distinct phonological profile.

=== Maithili ===
Maithili's schwa deletion differs from other neighbouring languages. It does not delete interconsonantal schwa, but shortens it, i.e., ə → ə̆ / VC_CV applies to the language in middle positions, and ə → ∅ / VC_CV in final. Word-final अ [a] is always deleted, except in monosyllabic words, non-syllabic य /e̯/ final words, if preceded by any non-central vowel and conjunct final words. For example, न na ('no, not'), प्रिय prie̯ə or even prije̯ ('dear'), and शास्त्र śāstra. In the middle position, it is shortened to [^{a}] /ə̆/, if unstressed. The stress rules as mentioned by Grierson in his An introduction to the Maithili dialect of the Bihari language as spoken in North Bihar, and his general Bihari grammar series has established a remarkably accurate stress-dependent schwa shortening or deletion rules, as compared to other languages.. It is also notable that many modern grammarians such as Ramawatar Yadav has not discussed much either on schwa or stress, and does not consider schwa shortening, but rather schwa deletion, i.e., ə → ∅ / VC_CV in all cases. Maithili, with increased influence of other languages through coming into contact with them, has been showing the phenomenon of schwa deletion sometimes with words that traditionally pronounce schwas. For instance, हमरो is həməro ('even ours') with schwas but is pronounced həmᵊro. That is akin to the neighbouring Bhojpuri in which हमरा (meaning 'mine') is pronounced həmrā rather than həmərā from the deletion of a medial schwa.

=== Marathi ===
Marathi exhibits extensive schwa deletion. The schwa at the end of a word is almost always deleted, except in the case of a few tatsama words from Sanskrit as well as when the word ends in a conjunct. Schwas essentially get deleted when there is an opportunity for a consonant with a schwa to turn into a coda consonant for the previous syllable, though the actual rules are more complicated and have exceptions.

However, in places where the schwa occurs in the middle of words, Marathi does exhibit a propensity to pronounce it far more regularly than Hindi. Words like प्रेरणा, मानसी, केतकी retain the schwa sound in the ⟨र⟩, ⟨न⟩, and ⟨त⟩ respectively, often leading to their transliteration by native Marathi speakers in the Roman script as prerana, manasi and ketaki rather than prerna, mansi or ketki.

Sometimes, to avoid schwa deletion, an anusvara is placed at the end of the word. For example, the word खर (khar, 'roughness') is often read without the schwa. When the schwa needs to be made explicit, it is written as खरं (khara, 'true'). This often happens in the case of pluralization, e.g. फूल (phūl, 'flower') can be written as having the plural फुलं (phula, 'flowers'). This arises from the original plural marker -एं (as in फुलें phulē̃, 'flowers') having degraded to a schwa in modern speech, and the anusvara serves a purpose as a non-deleted vowel even though it is not realized as a nasal.

=== Nepali ===
Nepali orthography is comparatively more phonetic than Hindi when it comes to schwa retention. Schwas are often retained within the words unless deletion is signaled by the use of a halanta (⟨ ्⟩). सुलोचना (a name) is pronounced sulōcnā by Hindi speakers while sulōcanā by Nepali speakers. Some exceptions exist, such as सरकार (government), pronounced sarkār, not sarakār or sarakāra (this is often due to the simultaneous borrowing from both the Hindi spelling as well as its pronunciation).

The following rules can be followed to figure out whether or not Nepali words retain the final schwa in a word.

1. Schwa is retained if the final syllable is a conjunct consonant. अन्त (anta, 'end'), सम्बन्ध (sambandha, 'relation'), श्रेष्ठ (śrēṣṭha, 'greatest', a Newar last name).
  Exceptions: conjuncts such as ञ्च ञ्ज in मञ्च (mañc, 'stage') गञ्ज (gañj, 'city') and occasionally the last name पन्त (panta/pant).
2. Although postpositions are written joined to the preceding word in Nepali (just as in Hindi), schwa cancellation treats the words as if they were written separately. For example, उसको ('his, of him') is not pronounced as *usakō; it is pronounced were written उस को: uskō. Similarly, रामले (Ram-ergative marker, 'by Ram') is pronounced rāmlē rather than *rāmalē.
3. For any verb form the final schwa is always retained unless the schwa-cancelling halanta is present. हुन्छ (huncha, 'it happens'), भएर (bhaēra, 'in happening so; therefore'), गएछ (gaēcha, 'he apparently went'), but छन् (chan, 'they are'), गईन् (gaīn, 'she went'). Meanings may change with the wrong orthography: गईन (gaīna, 'she didn't go') vs गईन् (gaīn, 'she went').
4. Adverbs, onomatopoeia and postpositions usually maintain the schwa and if they don't, halanta is acquired: अब (aba 'now'), तिर (tira, 'towards'), आज (āja, 'today'), सिम्सिम (simsim 'drizzle') vs. झन् (jhan, 'more').
5. A few exceptional nouns retain the schwa such as: दुःख (dukha, 'suffering'), सुख (sukha, 'pleasure').

Note that schwas are often retained in music and poetry to facilitate singing and recitation.

=== Odia ===
Odia in its standardised form retains the schwa in its pronunciation as an open-mid back rounded vowel. Both medial and final schwas are retained: in the medial case ଝରଣା jharaṇā is pronounced /dʒʱɔɾɔɳa/ ('cascade, waterfall') and in the final case ଟଗର ṭagara is pronounced /ʈɔgɔɾɔ/ ('crêpe jasmine flower').

Sanskrit loanwords (i.e., tatsama words), being more formal, always have the schwa pronounced.

However, deletion is more common in a number of non-standard dialects (though usually proscribed), as well as increasingly in the speech of urban areas as a result of exposure to English and Hindustani (Hindi-Urdu). For example, the name of the city Bhubaneswar can be pronounced either informally as /bʰubɔneswɔɾ/ (especially when using the word in the aforementioned languages), or more formally /bʰubɔneswɔɾɔ/ (standard pronunciation).

=== Punjabi ===
Punjabi has broad schwa deletion rules: several base word forms (ਕਾਗ਼ਜ਼, کاغذ, kāġəz 'paper') drop schwas in the plural form (ਕਾਗ਼ਜ਼ਾਂ, کاغذاں, kāġzā̃ 'papers') as well as with ablative (ਕਾਗ਼ਜ਼ੋਂ, کاغذوں, kāġzō̃ 'from the paper') and locative (ਕਾਗ਼ਜ਼ੇ, کاغذے, kāġzē 'on the paper') suffixes.

== Common transcription and diction issues ==
Since Devanagari does not provide indications of where schwas should be deleted, it is common for non-native learners/users/speakers of Hindi, who are otherwise familiar with Devanagari and Sanskrit, to make incorrect pronunciations of words in Hindustani and other modern North Indian languages (such as Punjabi). Similarly, systems that automate transliteration from Devanagari to Latin script by hardcoding implicit schwas in every consonant often indicate the written form rather than the pronunciation. That becomes especially evident when English words are transliterated into Devanagari by Hindi-speakers and then transliterated back into English by manual or automated processes that do not account for Hindi's schwa deletion rules. For instance, the word English may be written by Hindi speakers as either इंगलिश/इङ्गलिश or इंग्लिश/इङ्ग्लिश (rather than इंग्लिश्/इङ्ग्लिश्) which may be transliterated back to Iṅgaliśa by automated systems, but schwa deletion would result in इंगलिश/इङ्गलिश or इंग्लिश/इङ्ग्लिश being correctly pronounced as Iṅgliś by native Hindi-speakers.

Some examples are shown below:

Word in Devanagari and meaning	Pronunciation in Hindi (i.e., with schwa syncope)	Pronunciation without schwa syncope (i.e., Sanskritised pronunciation)	Comments
लपट (flame)	ləpəṭ	ləpəṭə	The final schwa is deleted
लपटें (flames)	ləpṭē̃	ləpəṭē̃	The medial schwa, ləpəṭ, which was retained in लपट, is deleted in लपटें
समझ (understanding)	səməjh	səməjhə	The final schwa is deleted
समझा (understood, verb masc.)	səmjhā	səməjhā	The medial vowel also is deleted here, which it wasn't in समझ
भारत (India)	bhārət	bhārətə	Final schwa is deleted
भारतीय (Indian)	bhārtīy	bhārətīyə	Both the medial and final schwa are deleted, although the final schwa is sometimes faintly pronounced due to the 'y' glide; when pronounced without this, the word sounds close to 'bhārtī
देवनागरी (Devanagari, the script)	dēvnāgrī	dēvənāgərī	Two medial schwas (after व and after ग) are deleted
इंगलिश/इङ्गलिश or इंग्लिश/इङ्ग्लिश (English, the language)	iṅgliś	iṅgəliśə	Medial and final schwas (after ग and after श) are deleted
विमला (Vimla, a proper name)	vimlā	viməlā	Medial schwa is deleted
सुलोचना (Sulochna, a proper name)	sulōcnā	sulōcənā	Medial schwa is deleted

== Vowel nasalisation ==
With some words that contain /ɳ/, /n/ or /m/ consonants separated from succeeding consonants by schwas, the schwa deletion process has the effect of nasalising any preceding vowels. Here are some examples in Hindustani (Hindi-Urdu):

- sən.kī (सनकी, سنکی, 'whimsical') in which a deleted schwa that is pronounced in the root word sənək (सनक, سنک, 'whimsy') converts the first medial schwa into a nasalised vowel.
- cəm.kīlā (चमकीला, چمکیلا, 'shiny') in which a deleted schwa that is pronounced in the root word cəmək (चमक, چمک, 'shine') converts the first medial schwa into a nasalised vowel.

== See also ==
- Schwa
- Hindustani language
- Indo-Aryan languages
- Devanagari
