= Ankit Rajpara =

Indian chess grandmaster (born 1994)

Personal information
- Born: 27 August 1994 (age 32) Gujarat, India

Chess career
- Country: India
- Title: Grandmaster (2014)
- FIDE rating: 2452 (November 2026)
- Peak rating: 2511 (June 2014)

Ankit Rajpara (born 27 August 1994) is India's 36th chess Grandmaster and a chess prodigy from Gujarat. He started playing chess at the age of 8 and achieved great successes at National Junior chess tournaments.
