= Garmali Moti =

Indian village

See Garmali for namesakes

Garmali Moti is a village and former non-salute princely state in Gujarat, western India, ruled by Kathi Kshatriyas.

It lies in Sorath prant on Saurashtra peninsula.

== History ==
Garmali Moti was a petty princely state, comprising solely the village, ruled by Kathi Chieftains.

It had a population of 385 in 1901, yielding a state revenue of 4,700 Rupees (1903–4, mostly from land) and a paying a tribute of 220 Rupees, to the Gaekwar Baroda State and Junagadh State.

== External links and Sources ==
History

- Imperial Gazetteer, on dsal.uchicago.edu - Kathiawar
