= Garmali =

Garmali may refer to the following places in South Asia :

In Afghanistan :

- Garmali, Afghanistan

In India, two villages, each also seat of a former princely state, on Saurashtra peninsula, in Gujarat :

- Garmali Moti
- Garmali Nani
