= Garmali Nani =

Village in Western India

See Garmali for namesakes

Garmali Nani is a village and former non-salute princely state in Gujarat, western India.

It lies in Sorath prant on Saurashtra peninsula, Kathiawar.

== History ==
Garmali Nani was a petty princely state, comprising solely the village, ruled by Kathi Chieftains.

It had a population of 405 in 1901, yielding a state revenue of 2,400 Rupees (1903–4, mostly from land) and a paying a tribute of 194 Rupees, to the Gaekwar Baroda State.

== External links and sources ==
History

- Imperial Gazetteer, on dsal.uchicago.edu - Kathiawar
