= Bassein =

Bassein may refer to:

== India ==
- Vasai, a city in Maharashtra state, India; known as Bassein during Portuguese rule
  - Treaty of Bassein (1534)
  - Treaty of Bassein (1802)
  - Military history of Bassein
  - Vasai Assembly constituency
- Bassein Fort, a colonial fort in Vasai built by the Portuguese
- HMS Littleham (M2707), Indian Navy ship; formerly known as HMS Littleham (M2707)
- Battle of Bassein, part of Maratha Portuguese war; also known as Battle of Vasai

== Myanmar (Burma) ==
- Pathein, the capital city of Ayeyarwady Division, Myanmar; formerly known as Bassein
  - Pathein Airport, airport in Pathein, Myanmar; formerly known as Bassein Airport
  - Roman Catholic Diocese of Pathein, formerly known as Roman Catholic Diocese of Bassein
- Uzana of Bassein, heir-presumptive of the throne of the Kingdom of Pagan
- Pathein Township, township in Myanmar; formerly known as Bassein West Township
- Pathein River, a distributary of the Yangon River in Burma; formerly known as Bassein River

== See also ==
- Bassin (disambiguation)
