= Arnala fort =

Coastal fort in Maharashtra, India

- Janjire Arnala
- Part of Portuguese India
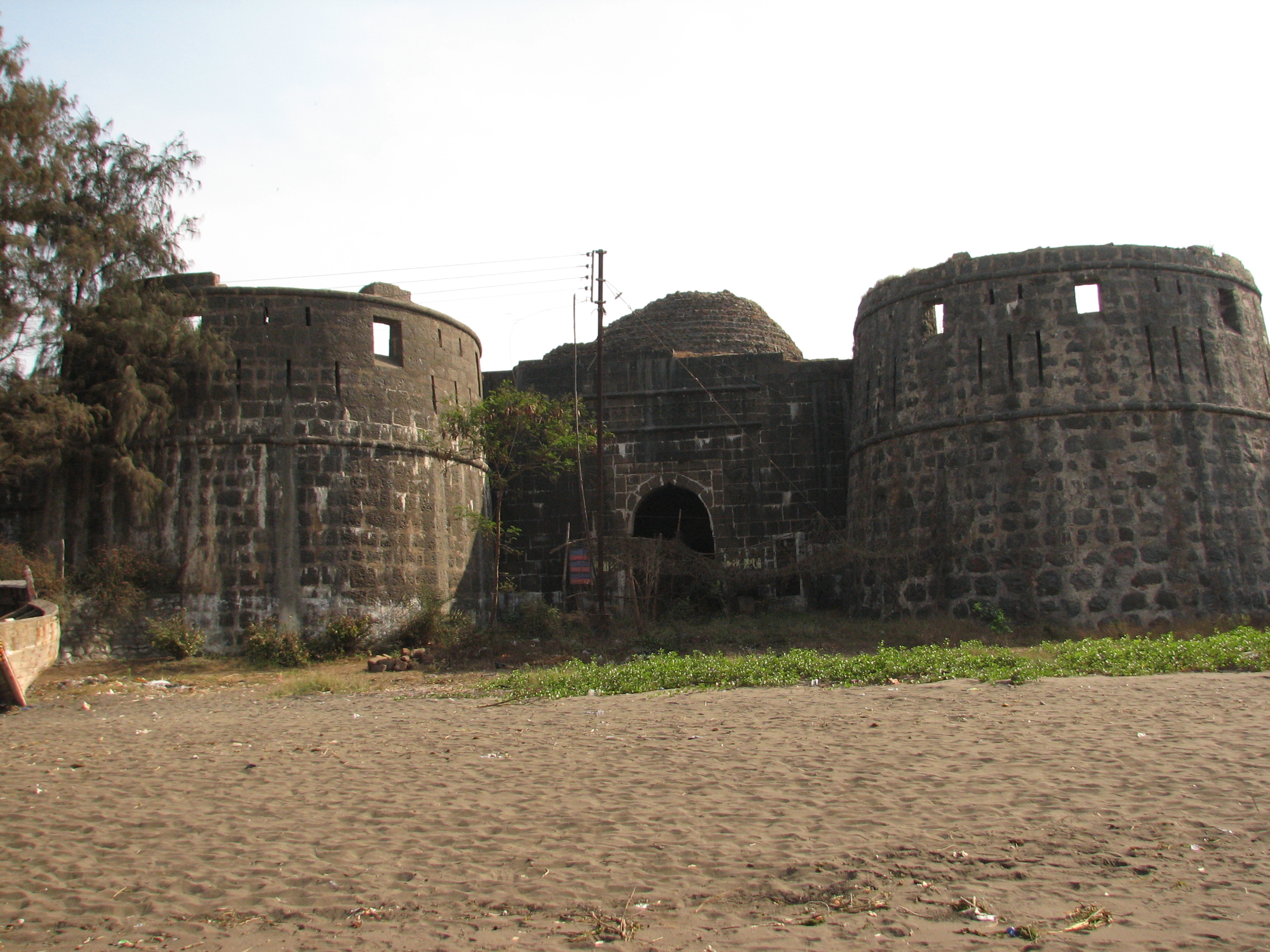
- Arnala Fort's bastion as viewed from the beach

Site information
- Type: Coastal Fort; Land battery
- Controlled by: Gujarat Sultanate (1516-1530); Portugal (1530-1737); Maratha Empire (1737-1818); East India Company (1818-1857); British India (1857-1947); India (1947-Present)
- Open to the public: Yes
- Condition: Protected ruins

Location
- Coordinates: 19.46577°N 72.73247°E

Site history
- Built: 1516; 510 years ago, rebuilt in 1737; 289 years ago
- Built by: originally built by Mahmud Begada; rebuilt by Bajirao I

Monument of National Importance
- Official name: Arnala Fort
- Reference no.: N-MH-M13

Arnala Fort is built on a small island off the port town of Arnala, located around 13 km (8 miles) north of Vasai, Maharashtra, India. Being an island fort, it is also called Jaldurg or Janjire-Arnala. The Marathas who built the present fort called it Janjire Arnala.

The Vaitarna River in North Konkan meets the sea near this fort, allowing it to overlook the entire bay.

The Government of India declared this fort as a National Protected Monument in Maharashtra on May 26, 1909.

== History ==
In 1530, the Portuguese constructed a bastion (Martello tower) on the island, strategically located at the mouth of the Vaitarna river. In the 1530s, the Portuguese had established their operations in the coastal area, headquartered at Fort Bassein, and soon gained control of the island. The Portuguese captain of Bassein donated the island to a Portuguese nobleman, who began construction of a 700-by-700-foot (210 m × 210 m) fort. The nobleman never completed the fort. Still, it remained under Portuguese control for two centuries; they used it to control shipping and navigation along the northern Konkan coast.

During the late 17th and early 18th centuries, after a long struggle with the Mughal Empire, the Maratha Confederacy came to dominate the region. In 1737, the then Peshwa, Baji Rao I, sent his brother, Chimaji Appa, to take the Bassein Fort from the Portuguese. After winning the Battle of Vasai, his general, Shankarji Pant, persuaded Chimaji to launch an assault on Arnala island, for its strategic importance to the Maratha navy in assaulting Portuguese interests. Their first assault, coordinated with a Maratha naval force commanded by Govindji Kasar and Manaji Agre, was routed by a superior Portuguese naval force. A second assault on the fort, on 28 March 1737, caught the Portuguese by surprise and forced them to abandon the island. Peshwa Bajirao I then ordered Shankaraji to build a new fort on the island. The fort has 10 bastions, and there is only one currently standing. On the fort's northern entrance, there is a plaque or Shilalekh, containing information about the building of the fort. The bastion constructed by the Portuguese still stands on the west end of the island.

The British captured the fort on 18 January 1781, during the First Anglo-Maratha War. The Treaty of Salbai nominally returned the Arnala and Bassien forts to the Marathas. The Marathas controlled the fort until 1817.

During the Third Anglo-Maratha War, despite painstakingly defending the fort, the Marathas were finally forced to surrender the fort to the superior naval power of the British. The British formally regained the forts under the Treaty of Poona.

Today, the fort is in a state of disrepair.

== Features ==
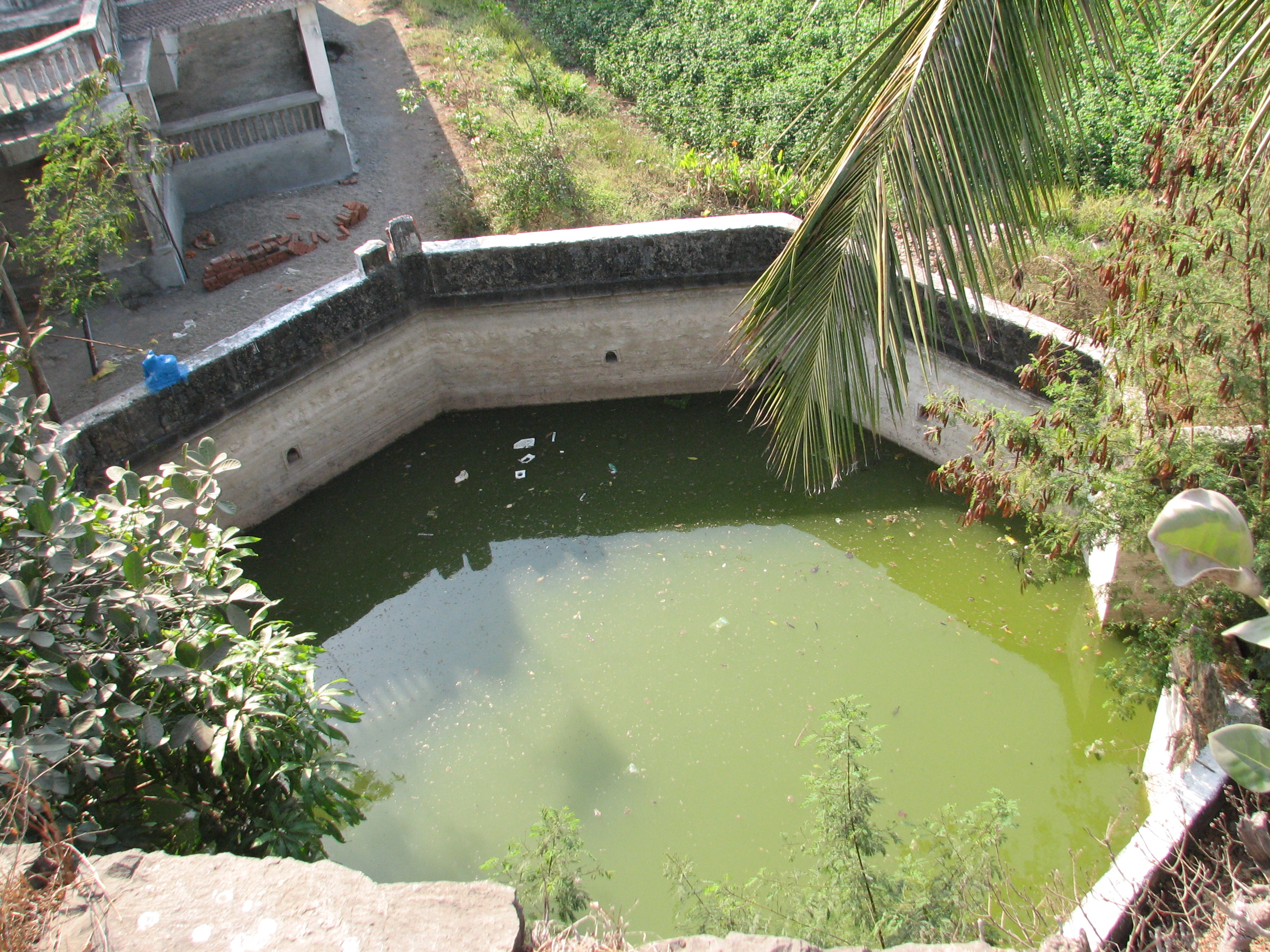
Octagonal water reservoir inside the fort.

=== Water Reservoir and Shrines ===
There is a large octagonal freshwater reservoir inside the fort. Within its walls are also the temples of Ambakeshwar, Bhavani, and Shiva, as well as the Dargas (tombs) of Shah Ali and Hajji Ali. The 'paduka' or sacred sandals, of Shrinity Anand are housed in a dome on the eastern face of the fort.

=== The Entrance ===
The main entrance of the fort faces approximately north.

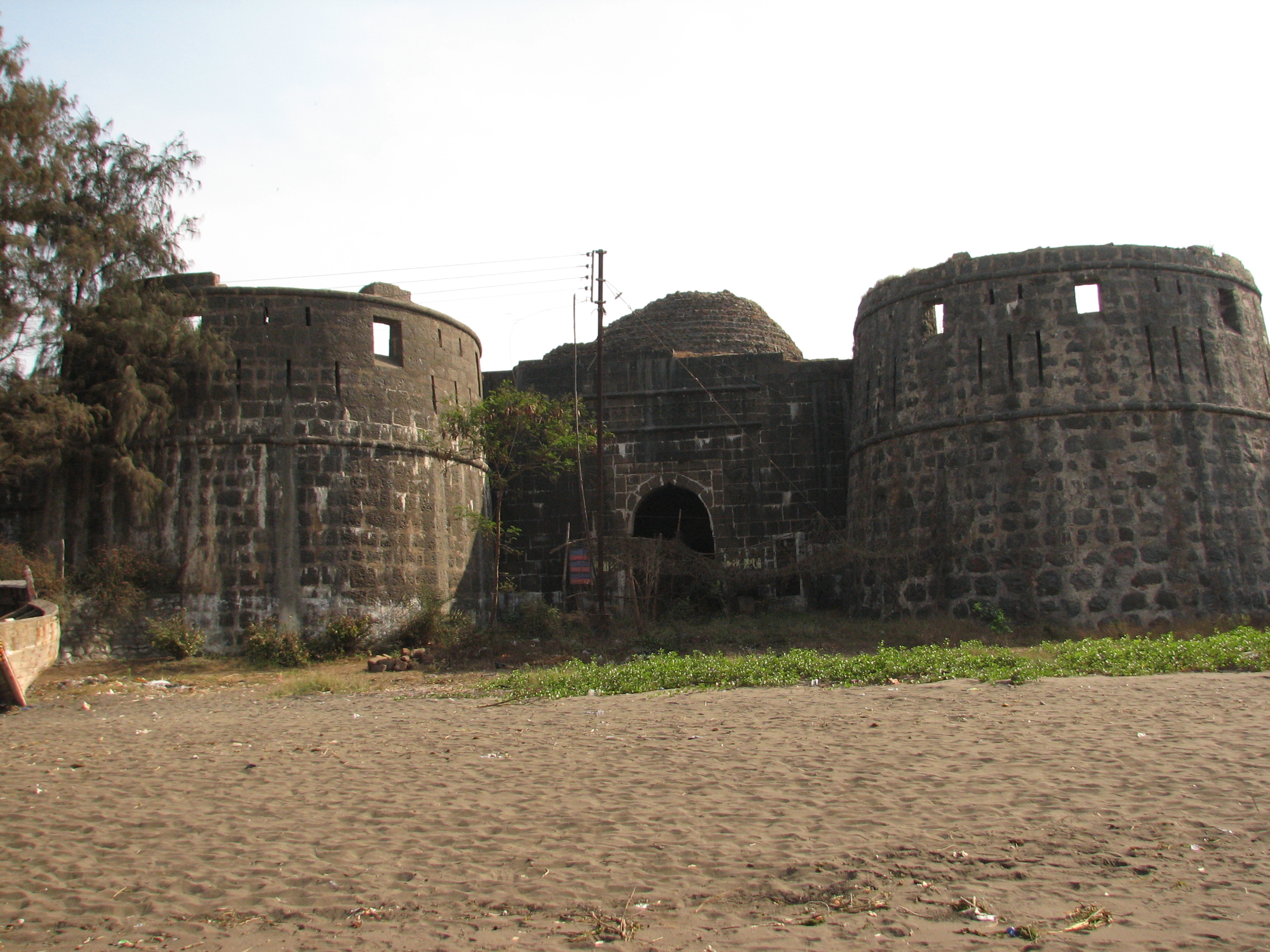
Main entrance as seen from the North side.

The solid stone doorway is adorned with pictures of Sharabhas and Elephants.

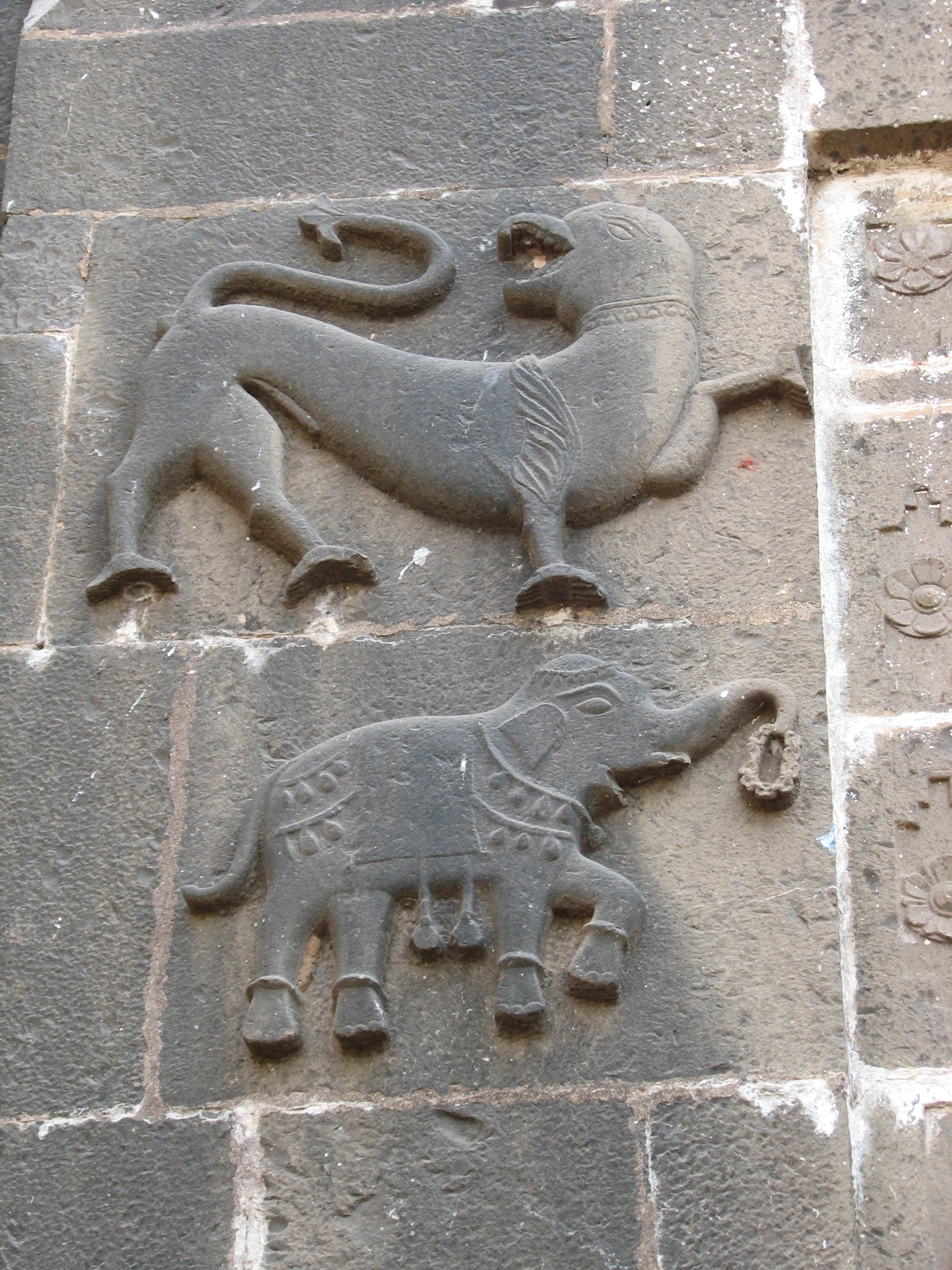
Detail of images of Sharabha and Elephant on the entrance door.

=== Ramparts and Walls ===
The external ramparts are in a fairly good condition, and a roughly three-meter-wide path exists along the outer walls. .

=== Southern Watch Tower ===
There exists a lone Martello tower about 550 meters from the main fort, on the southern end of the island. This tower has no entrance gate.

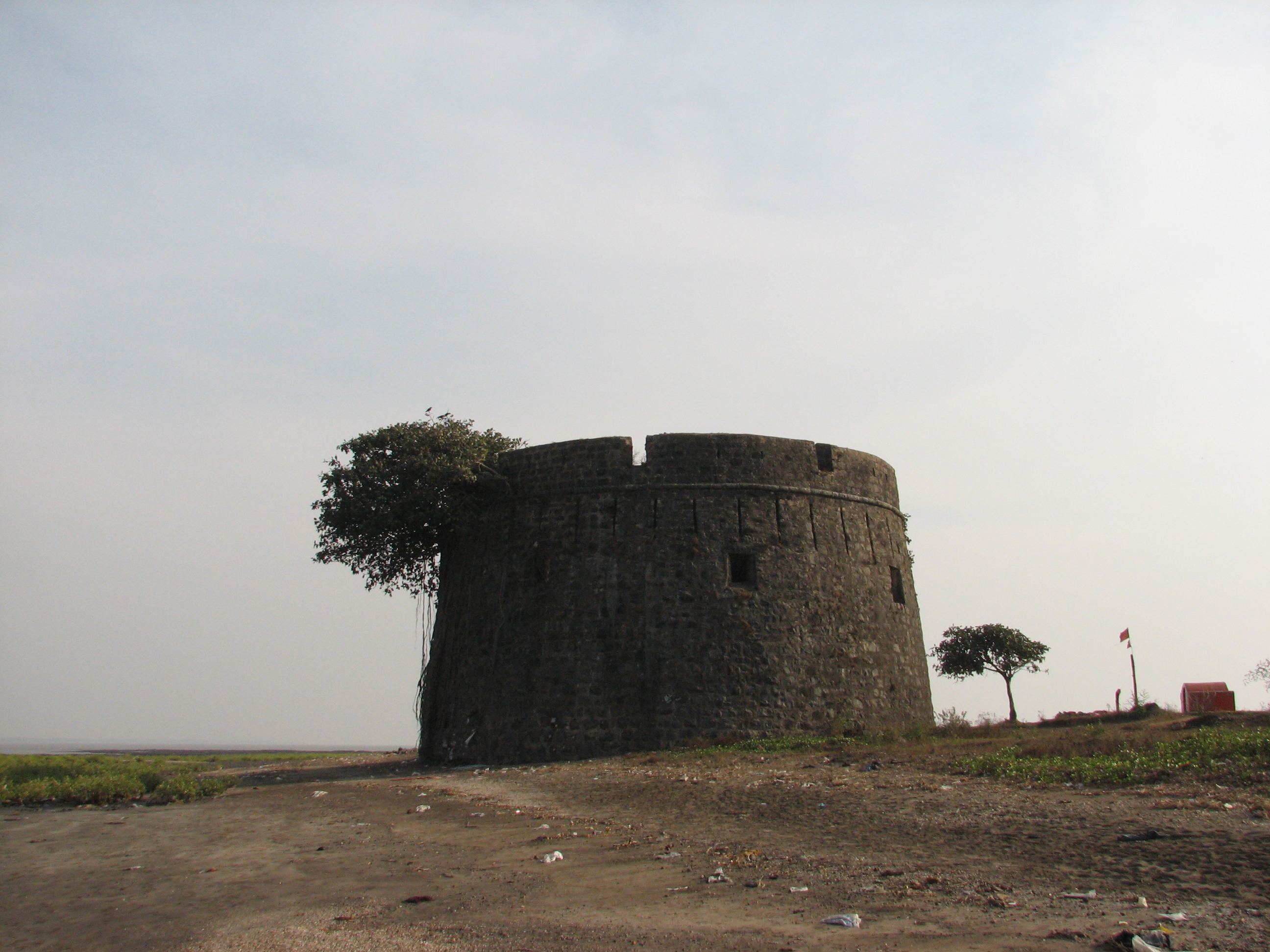
Martello tower on Arnala Island

== See also ==
- Bassein Fort
- Portuguese India
- List of forts in Maharashtra
