= Treaty of Bassein =

Treaty of Bassein may refer to:

- Treaty of Bassein (1534), between Sultan Bahadur of Gujarat and the Portuguese.
- Treaty of Bassein (1802), between the British and Baji Rao II, the Maratha peshwa of Pune (Poona) in India
