= Amrut Rao =

Maratha noble

- Born: c. 1770
- Died: 6 September 1824; Secrole, Varanasi District, Company India
- Known for: Titular Peshwa of the Maratha Confederacy in 1803, First Maharaja of Karwi
- Children: Vinayak Rao
- Parents: Raghunathrao (adoptive) (father); Anandibai (adoptive) (mother)

Amrut Rao (c. 1770 – 6 September 1824) was a Maratha noble and the adopted son of Raghunathrao. In 1803, Yashwant Rao Holkar invaded Pune and deposed his adoptive brother, Peshwa Baji Rao II. Following this, Holkar established an ad hoc council nominally headed by Amrut Rao and administered the Peshwa government in his name.

Yashwant Rao Holkar also installed Amrut Rao's son, Vinayak Rao, as Peshwa to strengthen the legal legitimacy of his administration, as Vinayak Rao had been adopted by the widow of the deceased Peshwa Madhavrao II. However, Baji Rao II sought assistance from the British East India Company, whose advance forced Amrut Rao and his son to flee Pune.

Subsequently, Amrut Rao signed a treaty with the British, agreeing to relinquish all claims to the Peshwa's office in exchange for a pension and an estate in the Bundelkhand region.

== Early life ==
Amrut Rao was born around 1770. He was adopted by Raghunathrao, who served as the 11th Peshwa and allied with the British East India Company in 1775. However, the British later signed the Treaty of Salbai (1782) with Raghunathrao's rivals among the Marathas, recognizing Madhavrao II as the Peshwa. Raghunath Rao died a year later in 1783, and his family was placed in confinement by the minister Nana Fadnavis. His wife Anandi Bai, sons Baji Rao II and Chimaji Rao II, and adopted son Amrut Rao were all imprisoned at Kopargaon until 1793. Subsequently, they were moved to Anandwali near Nashik. Later in April 1794, they were confined to Shivneri Fort.

After the death of Madhavrao II, Nana Fadnavis and powerful nobleman Daulat Rao Scindia installed Amrut Rao's adoptive brothers—first Chimaji Rao and then Baji Rao II—as titular Peshwas in quick succession. After Fadnavis' death, Daulat Rao Scindia held the actual power, while Baji Rao II remained a puppet Peshwa.

== Conflict with Daulat Rao Scindia ==
The widows of Daulat Rao Scindia's predecessor, Mahadji Scindia, struggled with Amrut Rao for control of the Scindia court. In 1798, Scindia decided to transfer the widows to Ahmednagar and keep them in confinement there. However, Muzaffar Khan, an officer loyal to the widows, rescued them near Koregaon Bhima while Scindia's men were escorting them to Ahmednagar. Khan brought the widows to Amrut Rao, who happened to be nearby, and Amrut Rao granted them protection.

On the night of 7 June 1798, Scindia sent five infantry battalions under the command of a French officer, Captain Du Prat, to retrieve the widows. However, Amrut Rao's forces repelled Scindia's troops. Scindia then initiated negotiations, offering the widows the choice of their residence. Amrut Rao arrived near Pune to meet Scindia on their behalf and set up camp on the banks of the Mula River, near the Khadki bridge. Scindia's father-in-law and general, Sarji Rao Ghatge (also known as Sarjerao), led two battalions to the riverside under the pretext of maintaining order during the local Muharram procession. However, his men opened fire on Amrut Rao's camp with 25 cannons. As Amrut Rao's troops dispersed, Ghatge's forces attacked and plundered the camp. The widows subsequently fled to Kolhapur.

== Holkar's occupation of Pune ==
On 25 October 1802, Yashwant Rao Holkar, a rival noble of Daulat Rao Scindia, invaded Pune and defeated the joint forces of Scindia and Peshwa Baji Rao II in the Battle of Hadapsar. After taking control of Pune, Holkar decided to install a titular Peshwa. Although the office of Peshwa no longer held actual power, removing the Peshwa entirely would have faced opposition from other Maratha nobles. Holkar therefore summoned Baji Rao II's brother, Amrut Rao, who was in Junnar. Amrut Rao arrived in Pune with his son Vinayak Rao, who had been adopted by Yasoda Bai, the widow of Baji Rao II's predecessor, Madhavrao II.

Holkar established an ad hoc council headed by Amrut Rao and administered the Peshwa's government in his name. He also attempted to legitimize his government by appointing Vinayak Rao as the new Peshwa.

On 13 March 1803, Holkar left Pune, leaving Amrut Rao with 1,000 soldiers. Meanwhile, Baji Rao II had fled to Vasai and sought assistance from the British. Holkar and Amrut Rao unsuccessfully attempted to gain British support for their government. However, the British signed the Treaty of Bassein with Baji Rao on 31 December 1802. In 1803, the British dispatched an army led by Arthur Wellesley to capture Pune and restore Baji Rao II as a titular Peshwa under British authority. Amrut Rao was forced to flee Pune with Holkar's men.

As Wellesley advanced, he received reports that Amrut Rao had plundered the city and Holkar had ordered its destruction before leaving. However, by the time Wellesley reached Pune on 20 April 1803, the city was intact. The British restored Baji Rao II as a titular Peshwa under their control on 13 May 1803.

== After fleeing Pune ==
Holkar had left his European officer William Linnæus Gardner as a liaison (and spy) in Amrut Rao's camp. Feeling betrayed after being forced to flee with a small force, Amrut Rao imprisoned Gardner. He later proposed that Gardner join him in serving Holkar's rival, Scindia, but Gardner refused. At one point, Amrut Rao's soldiers bound Gardner to the muzzle of a cannon, though he was not executed as Amrut Rao was aware of his value as a prisoner. Gardner eventually escaped while Amrut Rao was en route to meet Scindia.

Meanwhile, Wellesley opened correspondence with Amrut Rao, recognizing him as a potential ally who could turn into a threat if antagonized. Amrut Rao, who had joined Holkar reluctantly, saw little reason to oppose the British. Negotiations followed, despite Peshwa Baji Rao II viewing Amrut Rao as an enemy. On 14 August 1803, Amrut Rao signed an agreement with the British, renouncing all claims to the Peshwa's office and agreeing to remain friendly. In return, he received an annual pension of ₹7 lakhs and a jagir in Banda district. He settled at Karwi, where he and his descendants governed the Tiroha (Kirur) estate of the Bundelkhand Agency.

Amrut Rao eventually became known for his religious devotion and charitable acts. He once paid off the debts of all persons imprisoned for debt in Benares. In 1814, he undertook a sacred journey from Benaras to the Baidyanath temple in Deoghar, accompanied by nearly 2,000 armed men, including soldiers and attendants.

He died on 6 September 1824 at Secrole near Benares. His son and successor Vinayak Rao died childless in 1853. Vinayak Rao's adopted sons, Narayana Rao and Madho Rao, joined the 1857 uprising after their pension was stopped by the Company. The revolt was crushed: Narayana Rao died in prison, while Madho Rao was allowed to remain a landlord due to his young age at the time.

Narayana Rao's daughter was later awarded a state in Banda and Chitrakoot, with guarantees from Scindia and Holkar.
