= Treaty of Poona (1817) =

1817 treaty between the East India Company and Pune

Treaty between the Honourable East India Company and His Highness Bajee Rao Rughonath Rao Pundit Purdhan, his heirs and successors, concluded at Poona, on the 13th of June, by the Honourable M. Elphinstone on the part of the Honourable Company, and by Moro Dixit and Ballajee Luchmun on the part of the Rao Pundit Purdhan, by virtue of full powers from their respective Governments— 1817.
- Signed: 13 June 1817
- Location: Poona
- Ratified: 5 July 1817 by Governor-General in Council
- Signatories: (Maratha Empire) Peishwa: (East India Company) Hastings; (East India Company) N. B. Edmonstone; (East India Company) A. Seton; (East India Company) G. Dowdeswell
- Parties: Maratha Confederacy; East India Company
- Languages: English, Marathi and Persian

The Treaty of Poona was signed on 13 June 1817 between the East India Company and the Peshwa (ruler) of Pune, Baji Rao II. The treaty resulted in the British gaining control of the territory north of the Narmada River and south of the Tungabhadra River. Baji Rao also had to give up any claim to Gaikwad. Finally, "he was not to communicate, in any manner, with any other power in India."

== See also ==
- Treaty of Bassein
