= Battle of Poona =

1802 battle during the Second Anglo-Maratha War

Coordinates: 18°31′54.12″N 73°51′24.66″E

Date	25 October 1802
Location	Pune, Maharashtra
Result	Holkar Indore victory

Belligerents
Indore State	Peshwa; Gwalior State

Commanders and leaders
Yashwantrao Holkar; Amrutrao	Baji Rao II; Daulat Rao Sindhia

Strength
20,000 cavalry	25,000 cavalry and 25 cannonballs

Casualties and losses
Unknown, but very less	2,000+ killed in battle

The Battle of Pune took place on 25 October 1802 near Pune between the states of the Maratha Confederacy. The forces of the Scindia (Shinde) and the Peshwa Bajirao II were attacked by the Holkars. While the British East India Company was not involved in the battle, its outcome and aftermath led to the Second Anglo-Maratha War.

In May 1802, Maharaja Yashwantrao Holkar with 20,000 men marched towards Pune to solve the disputes. He conquered Sendhwa, Chalisgaon, Dhulia, Malegaon, Parola, Ner, Ahmednagar, Rahuri, Nashik, Sinnar, Dungargaon, Jamgaon, Pharabagh, Gardond, Pandharpur, Kurkumb, Narayangaon, Baramati, Purandhar, Saswad, Moreshwar, Thalner, and Jejuri.

On Sunday, 25 October 1802, on the festival of Diwali, Yashwantrao Holkar defeated the combined armies of Scindia and Peshwa which was around 25,000 at Hadapsar, near Pune. The battle took place at Ghorpadi, Banwadi and Hadapsar. Maharaja Yashwantrao Holkar is said to have ordered his army not to attack first and wait until 25 cannonballs were fired from the other side; when the 25 cannonballs were fired, Maharaja Yashwantrao Holkar ordered his army to attack. As soon as he won the war, he ordered his army not to harm the civilians of Pune.

The Peshwa, when he learned he was defeated, fled from Pune with 2000 men via Parvati, Wadgaon to Sinhagad. Maharaja Yashwantrao Holkar asked the Peshwa to return to Pune.

On 27 October 1802, Peshwa Bajirao (II), along with Chimnaji, Baloji, and Kunjir along with some soldiers of Scindia, went to Raigad and spent one month in Virwadi. He then went to Suwarnadurgh, and on 01/12/1802, went to Vasai (Bassein) via a ship named Harkuyan. The British offered him enticements to sign the Subsidiary Treaty in return for the throne. After deliberating for over a month, and after threats that his brother would otherwise be recognised as Peshwa, Bajirao (II) signed the Treaty of Vasai, surrendering his residual sovereignty and allowing the British to put him on the throne at Pune. It was signed on 31 December 1802.

Panse, Purandhare, and some other Maratha Sardars had requested the Peshwa to return to Pune and have a dialogue with the Holkars. Even Chimnaji was against signing a treaty with British.

After conquering Pune, Yashwantrao Holkar took the administration in his hands and appointed his men. He freed Moroba Phadnawis (the brother of Nana Phadnavis), Phadke, and others who were imprisoned by Bajirao (II).

He appointed Amrutrao as the Peshwa and went to Indore on 13 March 1803. He kept 10,000 men of his in Pune for the protection of new Peshwa. The British reinsted Bajirao (II) as the Peshwa at Pune on 13 May 1803, but soon the Peshwa realised he was only a nominal Peshwa and the British had taken total control.

== See also ==
- Yashwantrao Holkar
- Battle of Bharatpur
