= Military history of Bassein =

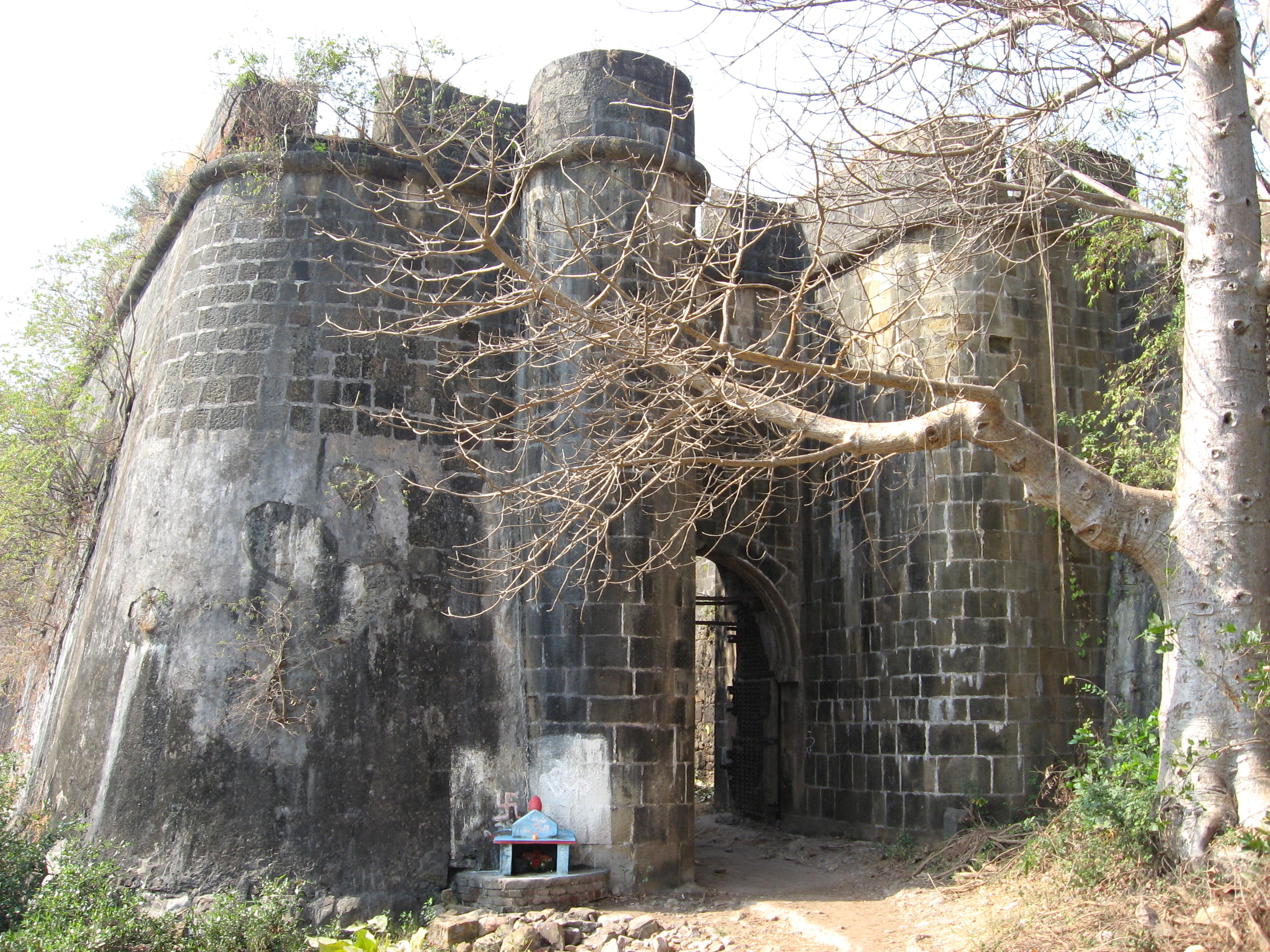
Bassein Fort was at the centre of Portuguese operations in the 16th and 17th centuries.

The military history of Bassein encompasses the period from 1526, when the Portuguese established their first factory at Bassein, until 1818, when Bassein lost its strategic importance following the defeat of the Marathas by the British.

Bassein (renamed to Vasai after Indian independence), is a city north of Mumbai (formerly Bombay) and forms part of Vasai Virar Municipality. It was historically known to the Portuguese as Baçaim. Medieval Bassein had a great strategic value for the Portuguese in maintaining their command of the Arabian Sea. It had utmost strategic value for the British East India Company for protecting the northern flank of Bombay. Its fort had a massive military presence. Bassein was a maritime hub with extensive shipping and ship building activities, and brought Christian culture to the Bombay area, next in importance only to Goa.

== Early history ==
The Greek merchant Cosmas Indicopleustes is known to have visited the areas around Bassein in the sixth century, and the Chinese traveller Xuanzang later on June or July 640 CE. According to Historian Joseph Gerson Da Cunha, during this time, Bassein and its surrounding areas appeared to have been ruled by the Chalukya dynasty of Karnataka. Until the 11th century, several Arabian geographers had mentioned references to towns nearby Bassein, like Thana and Sopara, but no references had been made to Bassein. Bassein was later ruled by the Silhara dynasty of Konkan, and eventually passed to the Yadavas of Devagiri, before being conquered by the Muslim rulers of Gujarat.

The Portuguese first reached the west coast of India when the Portuguese explorer Vasco da Gama landed at Calicut in 1498. For several years after their arrival in India, they had been consolidating their power in north Konkan. They had established a strong foothold in Goa, which they captured from the Sultan of Bijapur in 1510. According to Historian Faria y Souza, the coast of Bassein was first visited by the Portuguese in 1509, when Francisco de Almeida on his way to Diu captured a Mohammedan ship in the harbour of Bombay, with 24 Moors belonging to Gujarat.

== Treaty of Bassein (1534) ==
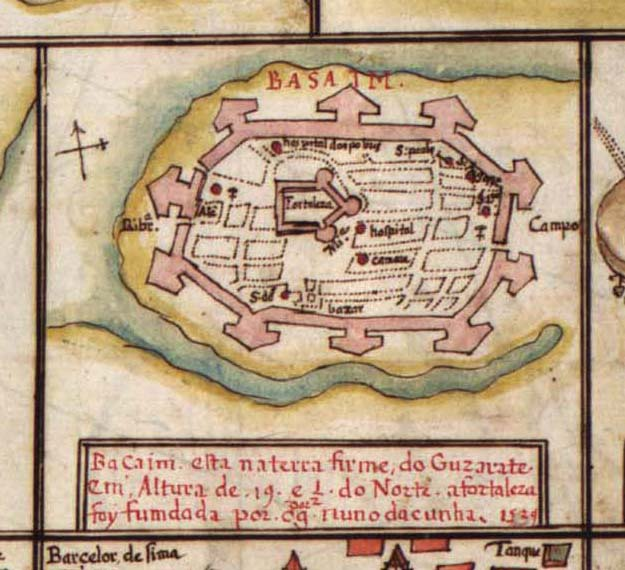
Map of Bassein (c. 1539), drawn by Nuno da Cunha, Governor of Portuguese India (1528–38)

The Mughal Empire, founded in 1526, was the dominant power in the Indian subcontinent during the mid-16th century. The dynasty was founded when Babur, hailing from Ferghana (in modern-day Uzbekistan), invaded parts of North India and defeated Ibrahim Shah Lodhi, the ruler of Delhi Sultanate, at the First Battle of Panipat in 1526. After Babur's death on 26 December 1530, his son Humayun (1530–40) ascended to the throne at Agra on 29 December 1530.

In 1534, Sultan Bahadur Shah had been engaged in warfare against the Rajput states of Chitor and Mandu, Humayun, and the Portuguese. To exterminate the threat from the Rajputs and the Mughals, he decided to sign a peace treaty with Nuno da Cunha, the Governor of Portuguese India. He dispatched his chief officer Xacoes (Shah Khawjeh) to Nuno da Cunha with an offer to hand over the port of Bassein, its dependencies, and revenues by sea and land, and the seven islands of Bombay. The cession of Bassein was not a great loss to the Sultanate, as Bassein was to the south of the Sultanate, and not of any military importance during warfare. The Portuguese considered the cession as a tangible gain. On 23 December 1534, the Treaty of Bassein was signed on board the galleon San Mateos (St. Matthew).

According to the treaty, all ships of the Sultanate bound to the Red Sea had to disembark at Bassein to take a cartaz, and then on their return voyage from the Red Sea, first disembark at Bassein, and pay duties. Ships trading to places other than the Red Sea also had to take cartazes, but were not obliged to pay duties to the Portuguese, while coastal trade required no cartaz at all. The Sultanate was prohibited from building any more warships, or using those it already had. Other minor clauses included the restoration of Portuguese captives, and the regulation of the horse trade.

Bassein and the seven islands of Bombay were surrendered later by a treaty of peace and commerce between Bahadur Shah and Nuno da Cunha on 25 October 1535.

== See also ==
- History of Bombay under Portuguese rule (1534–1661)
