= Treaty of Bassein (1534) =

1534 treaty between Gujarat and Portugal

Treaty of Baçaim (1534)
- Signed: 23 December 1534
- Location: At sea, aboard the Portuguese galleon São Mateus
- Mediators: An envoy from the Ottoman Empire
- Negotiators: Nuno da Cunha; Sultan Bahadur
- Signatories: Kingdom of Portugal; Sultanate of Gujarat

The Treaty of Baçaim was signed by Sultan Bahadur of Gujarat and the Kingdom of Portugal on 23 December 1534.

== See also ==
- List of treaties
- Military history of Bassein
- Gujarati-Portuguese conflicts
- Portuguese India
