= Treaty of Bassein (1802) =

Treaty between the British East India Company and Baji Rao II

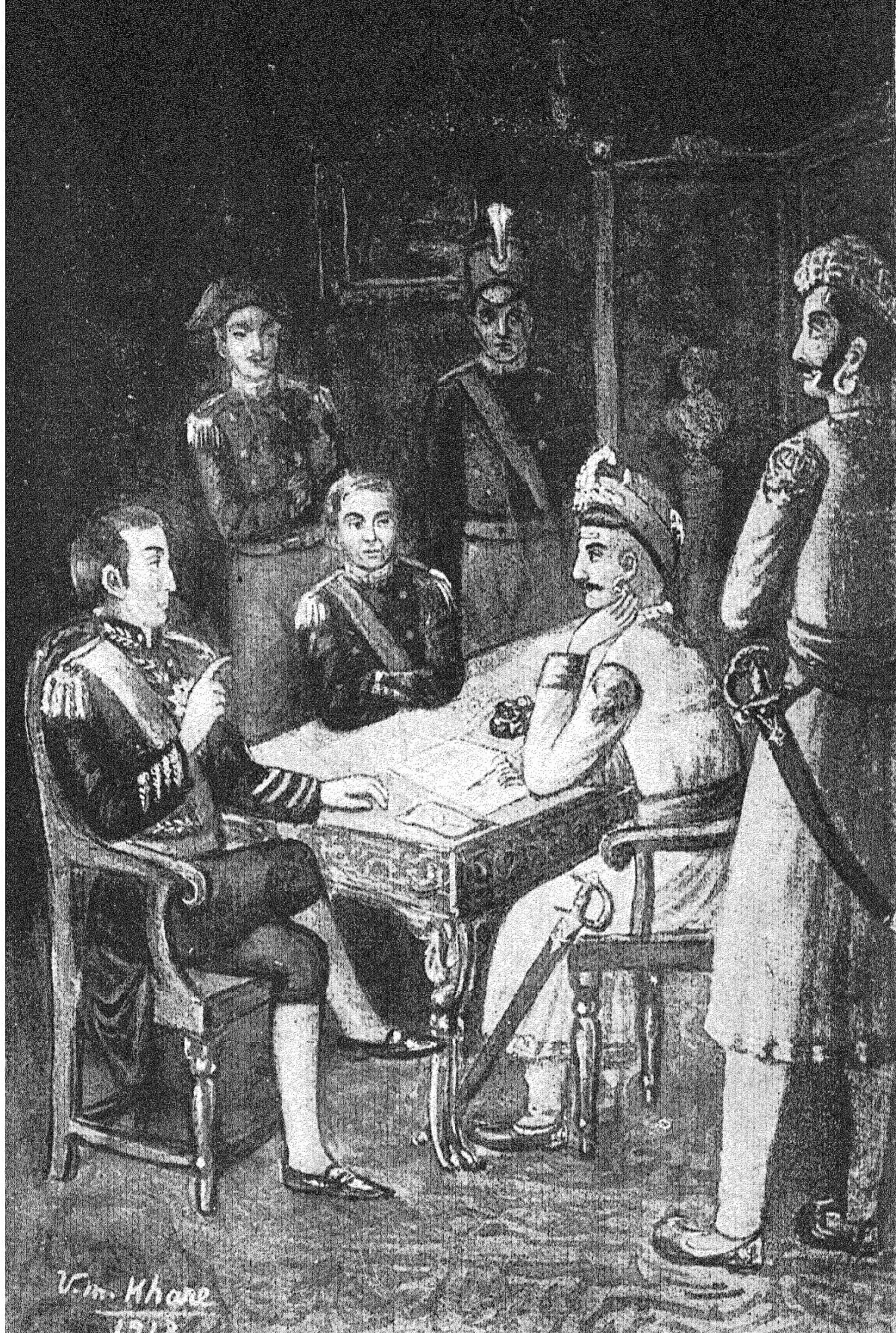
- Baji Rao II signing the treaty in front of the East India Company officials.
- Context: Signed by the Peshwa of the Maratha Empire after fleeing from his capital of Poona, concerned about his personal safety.
- Signed: 31 December 1802
- Signatories: East India Company; Baji Rao II

The Treaty of Bassein was a pact between the British East India Company and Baji Rao II, the peshwa of the Maratha Confederacy. It was signed on 31 December 1802 after the Battle of Poona, in present-day Bassein (Vasai). The treaty was a decisive step in the dissolution of the Maratha Empire, which led to the East India Company's annexation of the empire's territories in western India in 1818.

On 13 May 1803, Baji Rao II was restored as peshwa under the protection of the East India Company and so had become a British client ruler. The treaty led to the expansion of Company rule over the Indian subcontinent. However, the treaty was not acceptable to all Maratha chieftains and resulted in the Second Anglo-Maratha War.

== Terms ==
The terms of the treaty entailed the following:

1. A force of around 6000 East India Company troops were permanently stationed with the Peshwa.
2. Any territorial districts yielding 2.6 million rupees were to be paid to the Company.
3. The peshwa could not enter into any other treaty without first consulting the Company.
4. The peshwa could not declare war without first consulting the Company.
5. Any territorial claims made by the peshwa were to be subject to the arbitration of the Company (Nizam and Gaekwar).
6. The peshwa had to reanounce his claim over Surat and Baroda.
7. The peshwa had to exclude all Europeans from his service.
8. The peshwa had to conduct his foreign relations in consultation with the British.

== See also ==
- Treaty of Poona
