= Marathi-Konkani languages =

Set of Southern Indic languages in Maharashtra and Konkan

Marathi–Konkani
- मराठी—कोंकणी 𑘦𑘨𑘰𑘙𑘲—𑘎𑘻𑘽𑘎𑘜𑘲 Moratthi–Konknni ಮರಾಠಿ—ಕೊಂಕ್ಣಿ മരാഠി—കൊങ്ക്ണി
- Geographic distribution: Western India
- Linguistic classification: Indo-European: Indo-Iranian; Indo-Aryan; Southern Indo-Aryan; Marathi–Konkani
- Early form: Maharashtri Prakrit

Language codes
- Glottolog: indo1325

The Marathi–Konkani languages are the mainland Southern Indo-Aryan languages, spoken in Maharashtra and the Konkan region of India. The other branch of Southern Indo-Aryan languages is called Insular Indic languages, which are spoken in Insular South Asia (predominantly the island countries, Sri Lanka and Maldives).

== Languages ==
The languages are: Marathi, Konkani, Maharashtri Konkani, Phudagi (or Vadvali), Kadodi (or Samavedi), Katkari (or Kathodi), Varli and Andh.

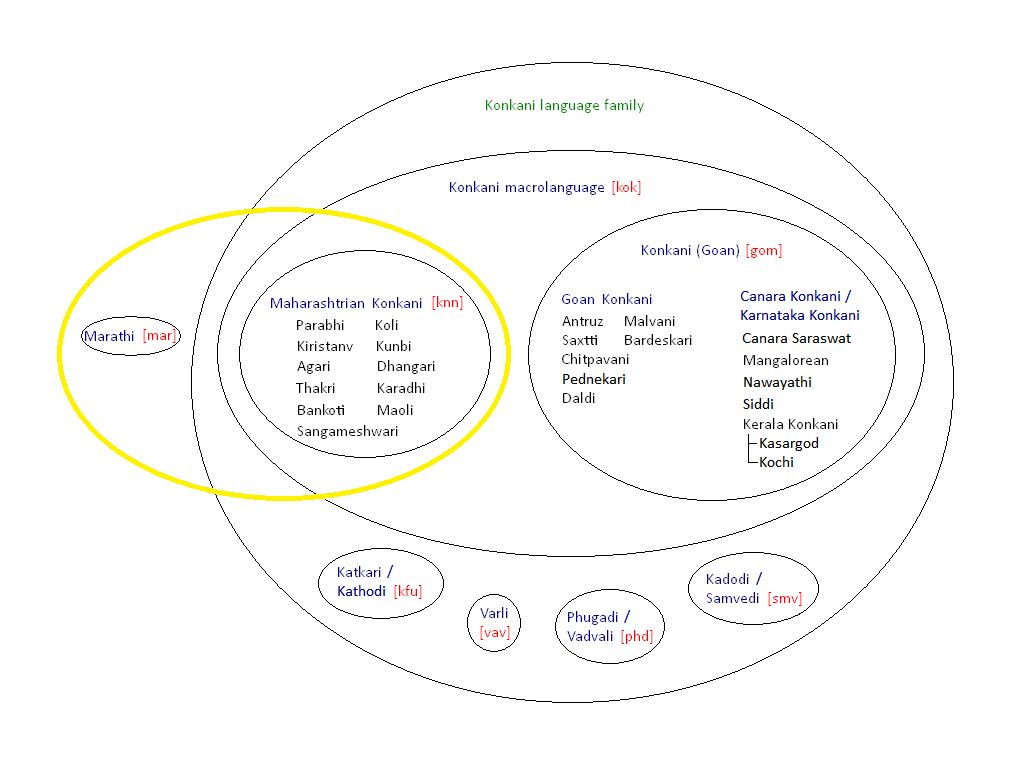
Venn diagram of the ISO codes assigned to the Konkani languages

Several of the Marathi–Konkani languages have been variously claimed to be dialects of both Marathi and Konkani.

=== Marathi ===
Marathi is predominantly spoken by the Marathi people in the Indian state of Maharashtra, and is also spoken in Goa and the territory of Dadra and Nagar Haveli and Daman and Diu. A Marathi-speaking community also exists in Karachi, Pakistan. It is the official language of Maharashtra, and an additional official language in the state of Goa. Spoken by approximately 83 million native speakers and millions more as a secondary language as of 2011, it is the most spoken Southern Indo-Aryan language.

=== Konkani ===
Konkani is spoken by the Konkani people, primarily in the Konkan region, along the western coast of India. It is one of the 22 scheduled languages mentioned in the Indian Constitution, and the official language of the Indian state of Goa. It is also spoken in Karnataka, Maharashtra, Kerala, Gujarat as well as Daman, Diu & Silvassa. While including the numerous dialects spoken across Goa and coastal Karnataka, the term 'Konkani' generally excludes the Maharashtrian Konkani dialects. The 2011 census noted around 2.25 million speakers of Konkani, with 788,294 speakers in Karnataka, 964,305 in Goa and the rest elsewhere.

=== Maharashtrian Konkani ===
A collection of dialects of Marathi–Konkani languages spoken in the Konkan region is referred to as Maharashtrian Konkani. It is often mistakenly extended to cover Goan Konkani which is an independent language. George Abraham Grierson has referred to this dialect as the Konkan Standard of Marathi in order to differentiate it from Konkani language. The sub dialects of Konkani gradually merge from standard Marathi into Goan Konkani from North to South Konkan. The various sub dialects are: Parabhi, Koli, Kiristanv, Bankoti, Agari, Dhangari, Thakri, Karadhi, Sangameshwari, Daldi and Maoli. These sub dialects are together considered by the ISO to be a separate language and is assigned the ISO 639-3 code knn.

- Aagri or Agri (spoken by the Agri caste found in Raigad & Thane district of Maharashtra; Dadra and Nagar Haveli and Daman and Diu; Gujarat)
- Thakri (spoken by the Adivasi and Katkari communities found in Raigad district of Maharashtra)
- Koli (spoken by the Koli or fisherfolk found in Mumbai (Bombay), Thane, Palghar and Raigad districts of Maharashtra
- Kiristanv (spoken by the Catholic Christians found in Korlai village near Alibaug, Raigad district of Maharashtra)

=== Phudagi ===
Phudagi or Vadvali was primarily spoken by Vadvals, which basically means agricultural plot owners, of the Naigaon, Vasai to Dahanu region. Somavamshi Kshatriyas speak this dialect. This language is preserved mostly by the Roman Catholics native to this region, since they are a closely knit community here and have very few relatives outside this region. It was also widely spoken among the Hindus native to this region, but due to external influences, ordinary Marathi is now more popular among the Hindus. There are many songs in this language. Recently a book was published by Nutan Patil containing around 70 songs. The songs are about marriage, pachvi, etc. The dialect of the Kolis (fisherfolk) of Vasai and neighbouring Mumbai resembles this dialect closely, though they speak with a heavier accent. There is a village in Vasai called Chulna, which was predominantly Roman Catholic (now cosmopolitan).

The striking feature of the dialect here contrasting it with Phudagi, is the preference of pronouncing the alveolar 'l' (ल) and 'n' (न) instead of the retroflex 'ḷ' (ळ) and 'ṇ' (ण), which was retained even in the 1990s generation of speakers even for conversing normal Marathi.

=== Samavedi ===
Samavedi or Kadodi is spoken in the interiors of the Vasai-Virar region along the north of Mumbai, up to the Thane, Panvel and Uran talukas of Maharashtra. The name of this language correctly suggests that its origins lie with the Samavedi Brahmins native to this region. This language, too, finds more speakers among the Roman Catholic converts native to the region (who are sometimes known as East Indians like other local Christians of Mumbai), but nevertheless is popular among the Samavedi Brahmins. This dialect is very different from the other Marathi dialects spoken in other regions of Maharashtra, but resembles Vadvali very closely. Both Vadvali and Samavedi have relatively high proportions of words imported from Portuguese as compared to ordinary Marathi, because of direct influence of the Portuguese who colonized this region till 1739.

(These Samavedi Brahmins have supposed origins in Odisha.)

There is a little difference between Samavedi and Kadodi. Kado's trace their origin from Samavedi Brahmins, Goans and Portuguese due to their inter communal marriages. Christianity in Vasai dates back to the 16th century. The churches built by Portuguese in the 16th century are still being used by Christians today as well.

== Official status ==
With the exception of Marathi and Goan Konkani, the languages have no official status. Most are considered to be a dialect of one of the larger local languages. Goan Konkani is the official language of the Indian state of Goa along with minor Marathi, which is the official language of Maharashtra, and both are also among India's scheduled languages. Many native Goans have challenged the status of Marathi being an official language in Goa.
