= Sarde =

Village in Maharashtra

- Village
- Location in Kokan, Maharashtra, India Sarde (India)
- Coordinates: 18°50′0″N 73°0′27″E
- Country: India
- State: Maharashtra
- District: Raigad

Area
  - Total: 422.20 ha (1,043.3 acres)

Population
  - Total: 1,389
  - Density: 329.0/km^{2} (852.1/sq mi)

Languages
  - Official: Marathi
- Time zone: UTC+5:30 (IST)
- PIN: 400702
- Nearest city: Uran, Pen, Navi Mumbai, Naina

Sarde is an Indian village in the Tehsil of Uran of the Raigad District of the Indian state of Maharashtra.

== Demographics ==
As of the 2011 census, Sarde has a total population of 1389. 51% of the population is male, and 10% are aged 0–6. Of the 338 households, 98% belong to the Agri Community where they speak Agri dialect. 2% are from Scheduled Tribes and none from Scheduled Castes.

The literacy rate is 73% (67% for females, 79% for males). 45% had a steady job of six or more months at the time of the census (main workers), and 3% a less steady job (marginal workers): of the main workers, 42% were cultivators, 12% agricultural laborers, 2% household industry workers, and 45% other workers.
