= Pirkon =

Pirkon पिरकोन
- Village
- Location in Kokan, Maharashtra, India
- Coordinates: 18°50′0″N 73°0′27″E
- Country: India
- State: Maharashtra
- District: Raigad

Area
  - Total: 562.20 ha (1,389.2 acres)

Population
  - Total: 3,015
  - Density: 536.3/km^{2} (1,389/sq mi)

Languages
  - Official: Marathi
  - Local: Agri
- Time zone: UTC+5:30 (IST)
- PIN: 410206
- Nearest city: Uran, Pen, Panvel

Pirkon is an Indian village in the tehsil of Uran of the Raigad district of Maharashtra. Farming and Fishing are the most common occupations in Pirkon. The population of the village is 3,015. Pirkon village is mainly occupied by people of Agri caste, for whom farming and fishing are main occupations of people.

== Culture ==
Pirkon has many Hindu temples some of these host annual festivals, such as the Wageshwar Temple, Shivshankar Temple, Shree Hanuman Mandir Goddess Ekvira Temple. Pirkon village's main attraction is the Palkhi of Goddess Ekvira, which occurs during the Chaitra month.

== Demographics ==
As of the 2011 census, Pirkon has a total population of 3015, in 719 households. 49.2% of the population is male, and 10% are aged 0–6. Of the households 2% are from Scheduled Castes and none from Scheduled Tribes.

== Education ==
There are following schools in Pirkon village

- Raigad Jilha Parishad Shala, Pirkon
- Karmaveer Bahurao Patil Madhyamik Vidyalaya, Pirkon
- Rayat Shikshan Santha's Karmaveer Bahurao Patil English Medium School, Pirkon
