= Vasheni =

Village in Maharashtra

- Village
- Location in Kokan, Maharashtra, India Vasheni (India)
- Coordinates: 18°50′0″N 73°0′27″E
- Country: India
- State: Maharashtra
- District: Raigad

Area
  - Total: 861 ha (2,130 acres)

Population
  - Total: 3,500
  - Density: 410/km^{2} (1,100/sq mi)

Languages
  - Official: Marathi
- Time zone: UTC+5:30 (IST)
- PIN: 400702
- Nearest city: Uran, Pen, Panvel Shivajinagar

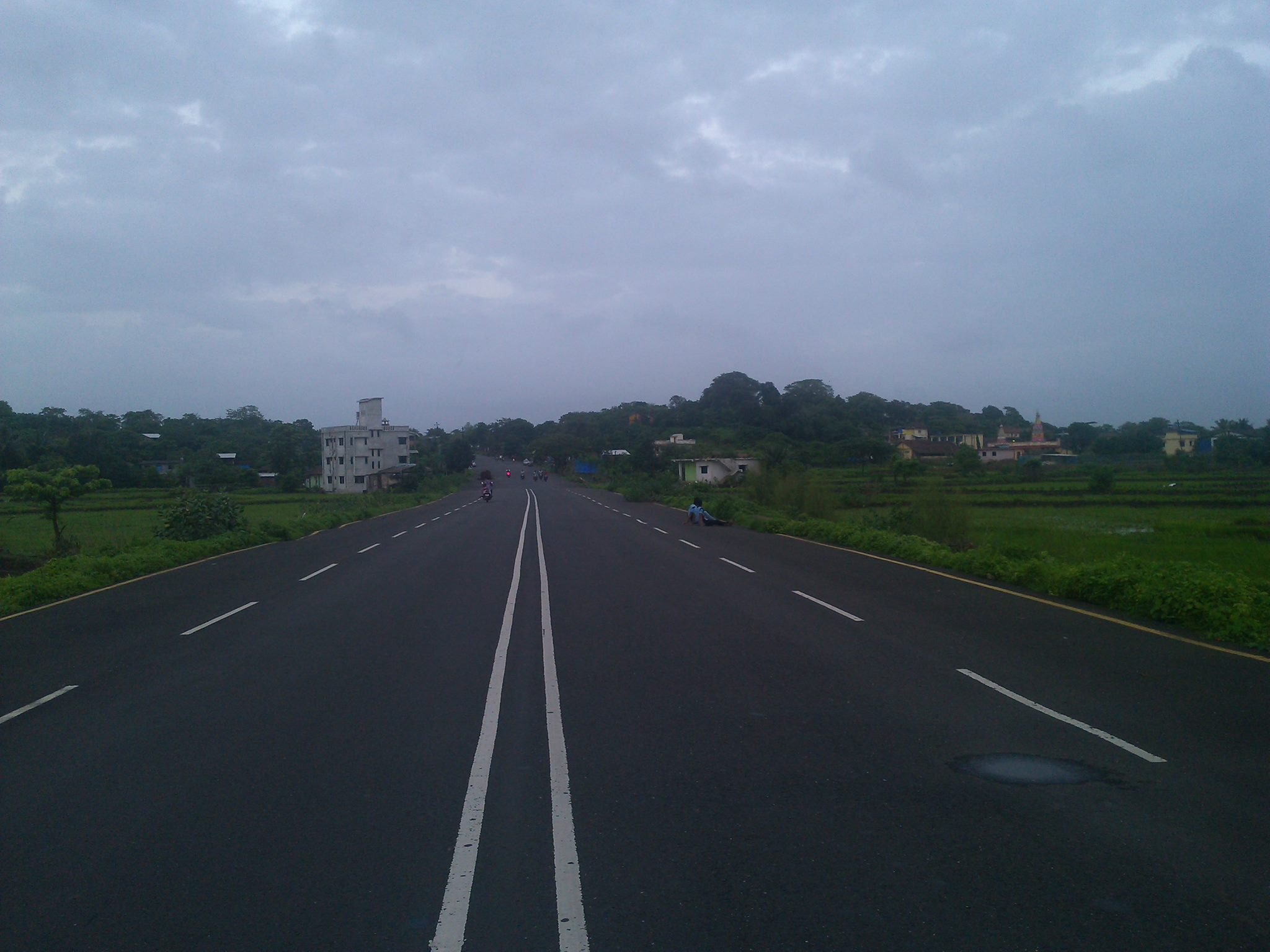
Vasheni

Vasheni is a village in Uran Taluka, Maharashtra state, India. The most common occupations in Vasheni are farmers, fishers and teachers. Uran, Pen and Panvel are the nearest towns or cities. The population of the village is 3,700. There are mainly Four sectors (nickname-Aali)

1. Varchi Aali
2. Khalchi Aali
3. Tep Aali
4. Belpada
5. Maath Aali
6. Dandeshwar

Vasheni is mainly occupied by people of Agri caste, for whom farming and fishing are main occupations of people. There are large numbers of teachers in Vasheni village. Vasheni has a high education rate compared to other villages.

There are following schools in vasheni village

1. Raigad Jilha Parishad Shala Vasheni (Khalchi Aali)
2. Raigad Jilha Parishad Shala Vasheni (Varchi Aali)
3. Chhatrapati Shivaji Maharaj High School Vasheni
4. Raigad Educaution Society English Medium School Vasheni
