= Kegaon =

- town
- Location in Maharashtra, India
- Coordinates: 18.885°N 72.912°E
- Country: India
- State: Maharashtra
- District: Raigad
- Elevation: 6 m (20 ft)

Population (2001)
  - Total: 7,924

Languages
  - Official: Marathi
- Time zone: UTC+5:30 (IST)
- PIN: 400702
- Telephone code: 022
- Vehicle registration: MH-46

Kegaon is a village in uran town of Navi Mumbai in the Raigad district in the Indian state of Maharashtra. The village which is on the western coast of Maharashtra overlooks the metropolis of Mumbai. The town is served by road from Uran, and boat from the port of Mora which connects to the Gateway of India and Ferry Wharf in Mumbai.

== Demographics ==
As of 2001 India census, Kegaon had a population of 7924. Males constitute 55% of the population and females 45%. Kegaon has an average literacy rate of 81%, higher than the national average of 59.5%: male literacy is 86%, and female literacy is 76%. In Kegaon, 12% of the population is under 6 years of age.
