= Katkari people =

Tribe mostly belonging to the state of Maharashtra, India

Katkari
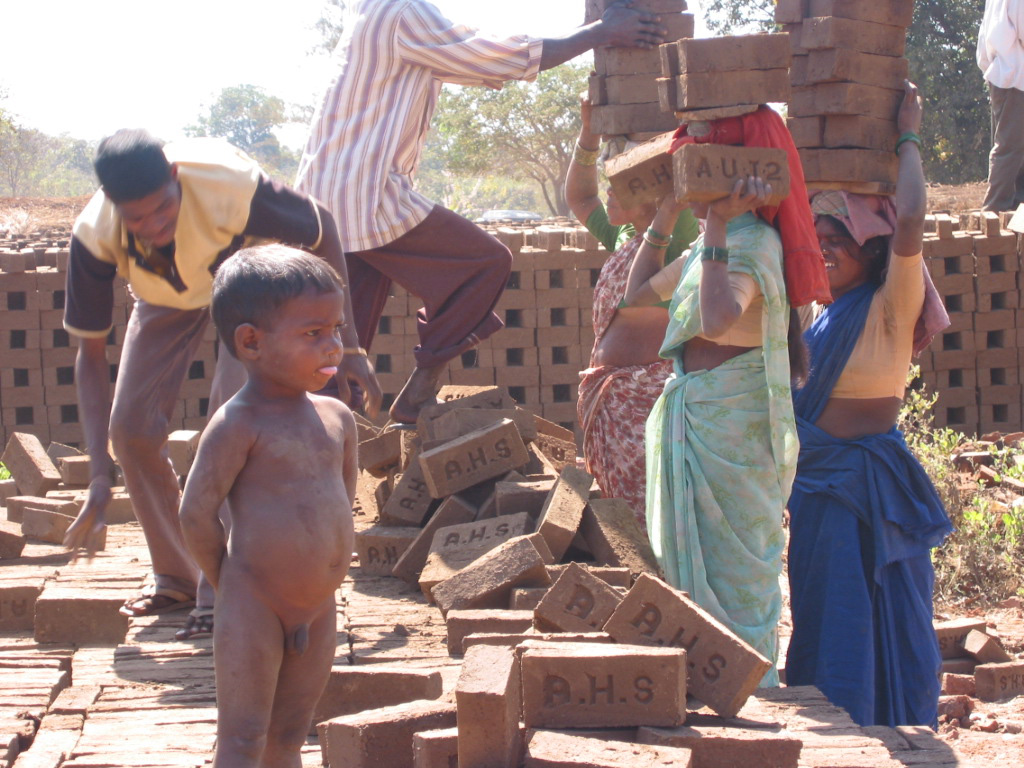
- Katkari at a brick kiln

Total population
- 304,073

Regions with significant populations
- India
- Maharashtra: 285,334
- Gujarat: 13,632
- Rajasthan: 4,833
- Karnataka: 274

Languages
- Marathi • Katkari

Religion
- Hinduism

The Katkari also called Kathodi, are an Indian tribe from Maharashtra. They have been categorised as a Scheduled tribe. They are bilingual, speaking the Katkari language, a dialect of the Marathi-Konkani languages, with each other; they speak Marathi with the Marathi speakers, who are a majority in the populace where they live. (Note: According to the 1991 census 99.32 percent of the community professed Hinduism, 0.16 percent Christianity and 0.08 percent Islam. The Katkari also reside in the states of Gujarat, Rajasthan and Karnataka, where they are designated as a scheduled tribe; they are not categorised as PTG. Less than 3 percent of Katkaris speak one of the over 24 languages other than Marathi.) In Maharashtra the Katkari have been designated a particularly vulnerable tribal group, along with two other groups included in this sub-category: the Madia Gond and the Kolam. In the case of the Katkari, this vulnerability derives from their history as a nomadic, forest-dwelling people listed by the British Raj under the Criminal Tribes Act of 1871, a stigma that continues to this day.

== History ==
The Katkari were at one time a forest people living in the Western Ghats of Maharashtra, with a special relationship to forest creatures such as the tiger or ‘waghmare’, (wagh = tiger, mare = slayer; so tiger slayer) a common Katkari surname. The name Katkari is derived from a forest-based activity – the making and sale of catechu (katha) from the khair tree (Acacia catechu). Weling (1934, 2), drawing on census data from 1901, notes that the Katkari were ‘thickly scattered’ in small communities throughout the hill ranges and forests of Raigad and Thane districts in the present day state of Maharashtra. Some also lived in hill areas in the southern part of the current state of Gujarat, and in the forests of what are now Nashik, Pune and Dhule districts of Maharashtra.

The Katkari population engaged in a wide range of livelihoods, including the production and sale of catechu, charcoal, firewood and other forest products, freshwater fishing, hunting of small mammals and birds, upland agriculture and agricultural labour on the farms of both tribal and nontribal farmers. The making of catechu declined sharply after independence when the felling of khair trees was banned by the Forest Department. Later restrictions by the Forest Department on delhi or shifting cultivation undermined the forest-based livelihoods of the Katkari. These interventions left the Katkari with few options but to move seasonally in search of employment and new places to live.

Beginning in the 1950s, Katkari families began to migrate permanently from ancestral areas in the hills to the outskirts of agricultural villages on the plains. Many very small Katkari hamlets are now spread throughout the region, including Khalapur, Sudhagad, Karjat, Pen and Panvel talukas in Raigad district and various talukas in Thane district, right up to the outskirts of Mumbai.

== Present circumstances ==
The Katkari of today are a fragmented and very scattered community, highly dependent on others for their livelihoods and for a place to live. Most Katkari are landless workers with only periodic and tenuous connections to their original nomadic, forest-based livelihoods. Many have become bonded labourers working on the brick kilns and charcoal units serving the urban and industrial interests of Greater Mumbai.

Patterns of population change among the Katkari, reflected in birth and mortality rates, seem to coincide with the problems of the so-called 'vanishing' tribes in India.

More than a third of the Katkari hamlets in Raigad and Thane districts are on private lands outside of caste (Hindu) villages. In recent years, rising land values near India’s booming financial capital have prompted landowners to sell their land to developers, putting the Katkari at increased risk of eviction. Entire communities have been surrounded by barbed wire fences as landholders attempt to intimidate residents into moving to other locations. In some cases, houses have been leveled and families forced to move. This is a form of land grabbing involving domestic elites rather than transnational commercial interests.

The Katkari struggle to remain in their hamlets provides an important contrast to the land tenure problems facing urban slum dwellers or Adivasis in remote areas displaced by large-scale development projects. Unlike Adivasis impacted by mega-projects, unpredictable forces at the micro level are driving the Katkari from their homes – haphazardly and one hamlet at a time. And unlike the situation in many urban slums, the Katkari did not squat in public and private spaces illegally, but rather settled where they had been invited to do so by landholders and other employers in need of labourers who could be easily bonded.

Despite their service, the Katkari community is firmly excluded from membership in village society. Particular expressions of untouchability, including physical exclusion, the assumption of criminality and a visceral reaction to Katkari food habits have created an extreme distance of the Katkari from the caste-based agrarian order.

== Demographics ==
The Census of India 2001 (GOI 2012) indicates that Maharashtra is home to 235,022 Katkari, mainly in Raigad and Thane districts. Small numbers of Katkari also live in the states of Gujarat, Karnataka and Rajasthan.

| Sr.No. | DISTRICT | NUMBER |
|---|---|---|
| 1 | Thane(Palghar) | 124507 |
| 2 | Raigad | 119573 |
| 3 | Pune | 15824 |
| 4 | Nashik | 10861 |
| 5 | Ratnagiri | 6921 |
| 6 | Satara | 3646 |
| 7 | Ahmednagar | 815 |
| 8 | Mumbai Suburban | 539 |
| 9 | Nandurbar | 454 |
| 10 | Sindhudurg | 414 |
| 11 | Solapur | 326 |
| 12 | Aurangabad | 197 |
| 13 | Latur | 142 |
| 14 | Dhule | 122 |
| 15 | Sangli | 121 |
| 16 | Jalna | 109 |
| 17 | Mumbai | 91 |
| 18 | Osmanabad | 91 |
| 19 | Kolhapur | 86 |
| 20 | Amravati | 81 |
| 21 | Nagpur | 79 |
| 22 | Beed | 62 |
| 23 | Parbhani | 54 |
| 24 | Jalgaon | 53 |
| 25 | Hingoli | 40 |
| 26 | Buldhana | 32 |
| 27 | Yavatmal | 26 |
| 28 | Wardha | 15 |
| 29 | Washim | 13 |
| 30 | Chandrapur | 13 |
| 31 | Nanded | 12 |
| 32 | Gadchiroli | 7 |
| 33 | Akola | 6 |
| 34 | Gondia | 2 |
| 35 | Bhandara | 0 |
| | TOTAL | 285334 |

== Culture ==
"We put our hands in the mouth of the tiger, open the jaws, and count the teeth of the tiger. We are the Katkari. [Waghachaya jabdyat, ghaluni haat, mojite daat, jaat aamchi, Katkaryanchi!] -- A Katkari saying.

Katkari living close to forested areas still consume over 60 different uncultivated plants and over 75 different animals and birds, gathering these with incredible ingenuity and skill. The food habits of the Katkari are a reason for their social exclusion. The Katkari are one of only a few tribal groups in India that eat rodents, including the Little Indian Field Mouse, the Black Rat and the Greater or Indian Bandicoot. They believe that their strength and long life come from eating the meat of rodents. They have even created a cultural festival, the Undir Navmi, dedicated to the rodent.

== Images ==
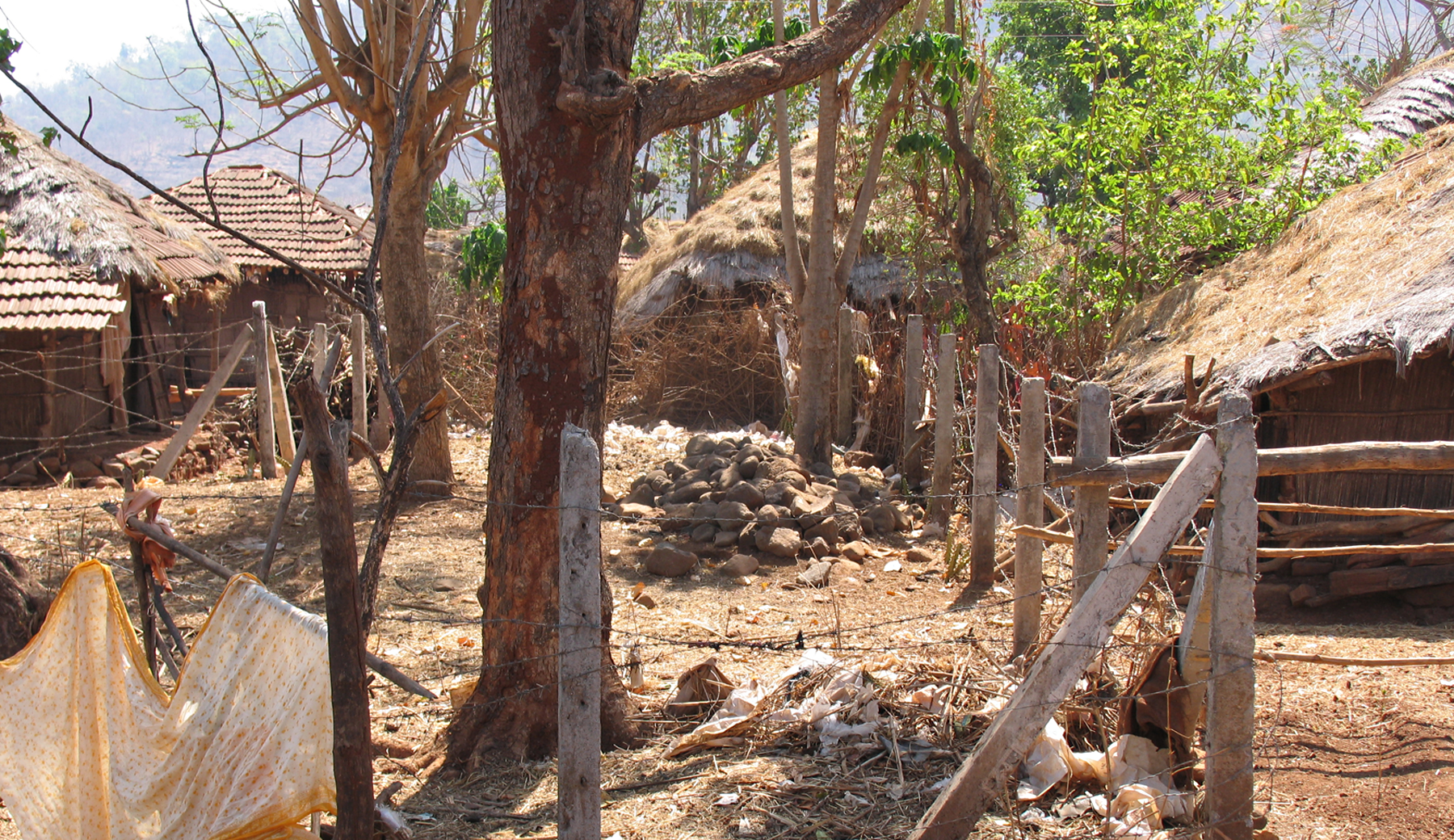
Katkari village

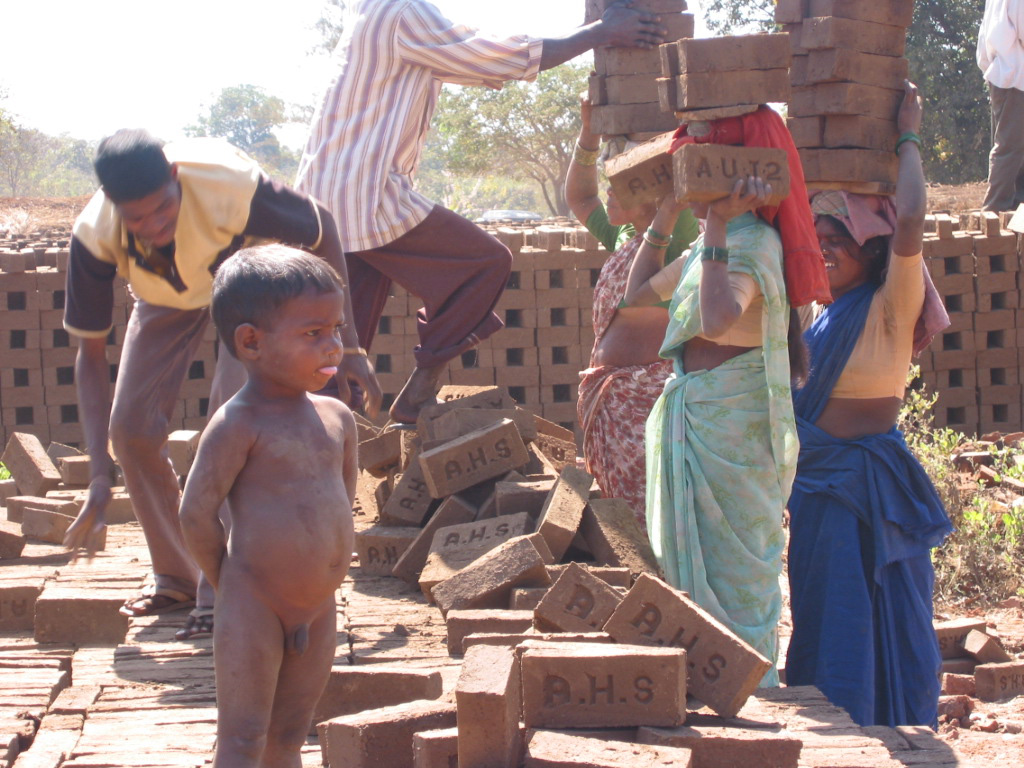
Katkari child at brick kiln.
