= Mandlik =

Mandlik is a surname. Notable people with the surname include:

- Babita Mandlik, Indian cricketer
- Elizabeth Mandlik, American tennis player.
- Hana Mandlíková, Czech tennis player
- Rambhau Mandlik, Indian politician
- Sadashivrao Dadoba Mandlik, Indian politician
- Vilém Mandlík, Czech athlete, father of Hana
- Vishvanath Narayan Mandlik, Indian lawyer
