= Saiwan =

Village in Maharashtra

- village
- Location in Maharashtra, India Saiwan (India)
- Coordinates: 19.4772391°N 72.9785353°E
- Country: India
- State: Maharashtra
- District: Palghar
- Taluka: Vasai
- Elevation: 69 m (226 ft)

Population (2011)
  - Total: 2,266
- Time zone: UTC+5:30 (IST)
- ISO 3166 code: IN-MH
- 2011 census code: 551659

Saiwan is a village in the Palghar district of Maharashtra, India. It is located in the Vasai taluka.

== Demographics ==
According to the 2011 census of India, Saiwan has 419 households. The effective literacy rate (i.e. the literacy rate of population excluding children aged 6 and below) is 60.25%.

Demographics (2011 Census)
| | Total | Male | Female |
|---|---|---|---|
| Population | 2266 | 1126 | 1140 |
| Children aged below 6 years | 324 | 160 | 164 |
| Scheduled caste | 10 | 5 | 5 |
| Scheduled tribe | 2143 | 1060 | 1083 |
| Literates | 1170 | 702 | 468 |
| Workers (all) | 1147 | 566 | 581 |
| Main workers (total) | 962 | 490 | 472 |
| Main workers: Cultivators | 562 | 250 | 312 |
| Main workers: Agricultural labourers | 177 | 101 | 76 |
| Main workers: Household industry workers | 3 | 1 | 2 |
| Main workers: Other | 220 | 138 | 82 |
| Marginal workers (total) | 185 | 76 | 109 |
| Marginal workers: Cultivators | 87 | 35 | 52 |
| Marginal workers: Agricultural labourers | 71 | 25 | 46 |
| Marginal workers: Household industry workers | 0 | 0 | 0 |
| Marginal workers: Others | 27 | 16 | 11 |
| Non-workers | 1119 | 560 | 559 |
