= Giriz =

Giriz may refer to:

- Qrız, Azerbaijan
- Giriz, India, see St. Francis Xavier's Church, Giriz
