= Phudagi language =

Indo-Aryan language spoken in India

Phudagi
- Vadvali
- फुदगी वाडवळी
- Native to: India
- Region: Maharashtra: Dahanu, Naigaon, Thane
- Native speakers: (2,500 cited 2000)
- Language family: Indo-European: Indo-Iranian; Indo-Aryan; Southern Zone; Marathi–Konkani; Phudagi

Language codes
- ISO 639-3: phd
- Glottolog: phud1238

The Phudagi language, also known as Vadvali, is a language or dialect of the Marathi–Konkani group. This language is spoken by Panchkalshi and Chaukalshi communities residing in Palghar, Vasai localities. It is considered an endangered language, due to its decreased use as a first language for young people.
