= Katkari language =

Language of India

Katkari
- कातकरी, कथोडी
- Native to: India
- Region: Maharashtra, Rajasthan, Gujarat
- Ethnicity: 294,000 Kathodi (2007?)
- Native speakers: 12,000 (2007)
- Language family: Indo-European: Indo-Iranian; Indo-Aryan; Southern Zone; Marathi–Konkani; Katkari

Language codes
- ISO 639-3: kfu
- Glottolog: katk1238

Katkari, or Kathodi, is an Indian language, which is classified with Marathi. It is endangered, with only a few percent of ethnic Kathodi speaking it. The Katkari people live primarily in Maharashtra.
