= St Gonsalo Garcia College =

College in Vasai, Mumbai

St. Gonsalo Garcia College is a college in Vasai, Mumbai established in 1984. The college is recognized by and is registered as an institute of the University of Mumbai. The college was converted into a 750-bed COVID-19 care centre during the first wave of the COVID-19 pandemic in 2020.

== Foundation ==
It is dedicated to Saint Gonsalo Garcia (1556 – 5 February 1597), the diocesan patron saint of Vasai and the first Catholic Saint of India. He was martyred for preaching Christianity in Nagasaki, Japan along with the other martyrs.

== Academics ==
The following courses are available in this college:

Undergraduate Courses:-

- Bachelor of Commerce (B.COM)
- Bachelor of Arts (B.A.)
- Bachelor of Commerce in Management Studies (B.M.S)
- Bachelor of Commerce in Financial Markets (B.F.M)
- Bachelor of Commerce in Banking and Insurance (B.B.I)
- Bachelor of Commerce in Accounting and Finance (B.A.F)
- Bachelor of Science in Information Technology (BSc(I.T.))

Postgraduate Courses:-

- Master of Science in Information Technology (MSc(I.T.))
- Master of Commerce in Accounting (M.COM)
- Master of Arts (M.A.-R.D.)
