= Francis D'Britto =

Indian Roman Catholic priest (1943–2024)

Father Francis D'Britto
- Born: 4 December 1943
- Died: 25 July 2024 (aged 80); Vasai, Palghar district, Konkan division, Maharashtra, India
- Occupations: Priest, writer, environmental activist

Francis D'Britto (4 December 1943 – 25 July 2024) was an Indian Catholic priest, writer, and environmental activist from Vasai, Mumbai. He was the author of the Subodh Bible, a translation of the Bible to Marathi.

== Biography ==
Francis D'Britto was born on 4 December 1943.

D'Britto was awarded the Dnyanoba-Tukaram Puraskar for his literary work. The Catholic priest was the first to get the award that was constituted in 2007.

In 2013, he won the state's literary award for best translation. The following year he received the Sahitya Akademi Award.

On 22 September 2019, D'Britto was unanimously elected as the president of 93rd Akhil Bharatiya Marathi Sahitya Sammelan (literary meet), to be held in Osmanabad on 10 January 2020.

D'Britto died in Vasai, Palghar district on 25 July 2024, at the age of 81.
