= Panje-Dongri wetlands =

Panje Wetlands
- Nodal Town of Navi Mumbai
- Location within Maharashtra
- Coordinates: 18.54°N 72.57°E
- Country: India
- State: Maharashtra
- District: Raigad
- Time zone: UTC+5:30 (IST)

The Panje-Dongri wetlands is located in the coastal town of Uran, Navi Mumbai in Raigad district of Maharashtra in India. It is a major bird watching site in Mumbai Metropolitan Region. The wetland is home to 1.4 lakhs migratory birds in the winter. It is the last surviving wetland at Uran.

The core wetland area at Panje covers 213 hectares and consists of foraging and roosting areas of several bird species. The buffer area of 157 hectares is mangroves. Panje consists of a mix of habitats including freshwater and saline marshes, reeds, mangroves, grasslands and scrub — make it a fine birding place.

The Panje wetlands are notified and protected under the Maharashtra National Wetland Atlas 2011. In 2015, The State Wildlife Board approved the creation of a bird sanctuary at Panje-Funde near Uran.

A film documenting the flora and fauna of this wetland was made by Aishwarya Sridhar-a young wildlife film maker. The film is called ''Panje-The Last Wetland''.

== Flora and fauna ==
The area is home to large numbers of coconut trees and mangroves. It is also the foraging and roosting area for several bird species like lesser sand plover, curlew sandpiper, little stint, gull-billed tern, brown-headed gull, black-headed gull, Heuglin's gull, blue-tailed bee-eater, lesser flamingo, greater flamingo, purple moorhen, Eurasian curlew, ruddy shelduck, common shelduck, Eurasian coot, spot-billed bucks, pheasant-tailed jacana, bar-tailed godwit, black-tailed godwit, ruff, marsh sandpipers, scaly-breasted munia, tricoloured munia, red avadavat, Indian skimmer, the Asian desert warbler, the bristled grassbird, Caspian plover and many more. Also, one can see as many as 800-900 flamingoes at Panje coastal village during the months of October–March.

In 2018, two rare wetland birds of the species red-necked phalarope were seen at Panje after a gap of 15 years.

Mammals include the Indian grey mongoose, gerbil, jungle cat, Indian fox and Indian jackal.

Reptiles found are the common rat snake, Indian cobra, checkered keelback, buff striped keelback, rock python, common krait, Russell's viper and saw scaled viper.

== Fishing ==
Panje wetland is rich in terms of fish catch. The Uran wetlands serve as a fish breeding ground and the main livelihood of the local people is fishing.

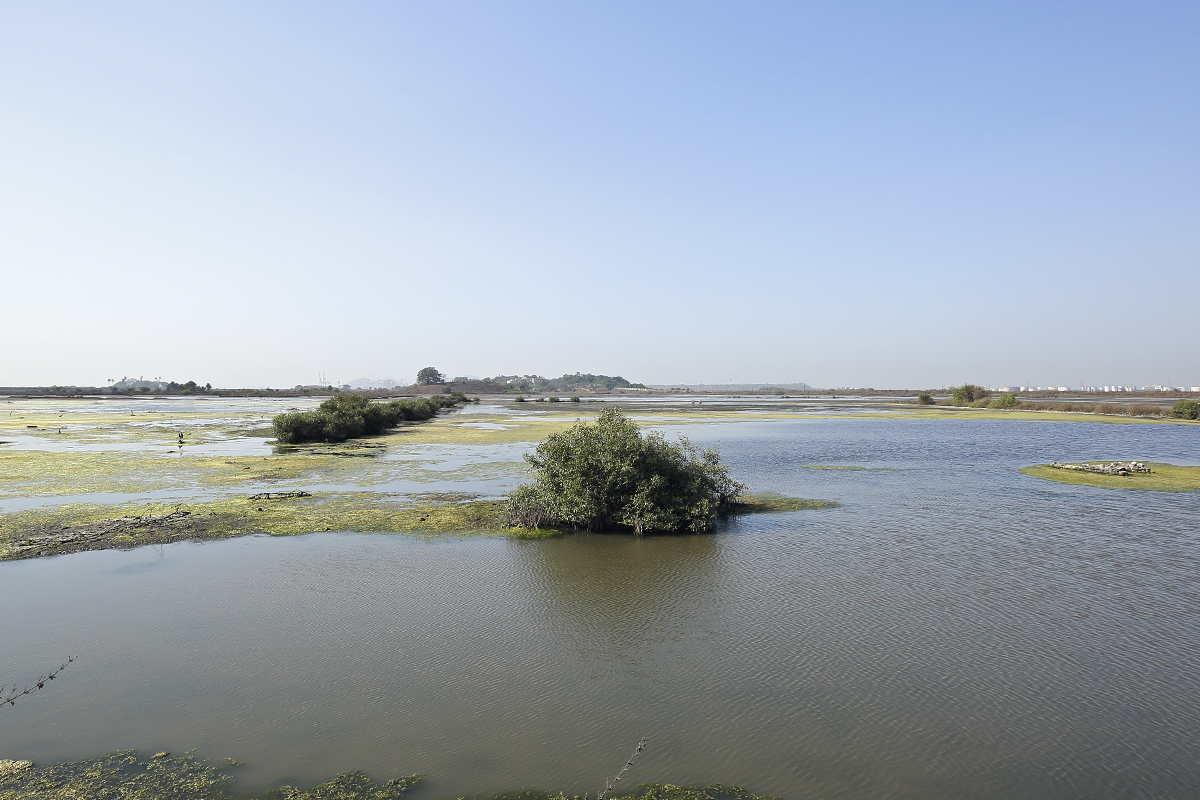
Panje Wetlands

== Controversy ==
Around 85% of Uran’s wetlands have been destroyed. Recurring cases of mangrove destruction (9500 trees) and reclamation of wetlands have happened at Uran. Recently illegal landfills are on the rise and the wetlands are being slowly assimilated in the coastal city. This unprecedented land development and urbanization are creating concerns about the impact on the environment. This is because the wetlands serve as a natural sponge absorbing excess rainfall and doing its bit to reduce pollution. Wetlands are under threat due to exponential expansion of real-estate projects in Mumbai Now a day, land encroachment and land alteration are the important aspect of threats for Panje wetlands and the Bombay Natural History Society (BNHS) had also published a report stating the protection of Panje wetlands due to its proximity to the Navi Mumbai International Airport.

The wetland is a part of the Navi Mumbai Special Economic Zone and in the entire wetland a boundary has been created by the economic zone.

In September 2018, City and Industrial Development Corporation of Maharashtra shut the high tide water ingress to the Panje Wetlands. The barrier was built in the year 1991 with help from Indian Institute of Technology, Bombay as a flood control mechanism. It shuts automatically during high tide and opens during low tide, remaining closed throughout the monsoon months. However, in the last week of September, some gates were damaged and the barrier was shut down, starving water supply into the mangroves. Around 60% of the Panje wetlands dried up. Navi Mumbai residents and environmentalists filed a complaint with the state highlighting the development corporation's actions. This led to the HC appointed state mangrove committee to issue directions to stop reclamation activities at Uran to protect bird habitats. On October 6, 2018, development corporation opened 10 of the 76 sluice gates. But environmentalists complained it wasn’t enough to sustain the wetland. Vanashakti (a non-governmental organization) filed a contempt petition against the development corporation under its original petition to safeguard wetlands in Maharashtra. On October 10, 2018, a day before the Bombay High Court appointed wetland grievance redressal committee was to hear the matter, the development corporation vice chairman and managing director instructed his engineering team to open the majority of the gates at Panje. Seventy gates were opened and the wetland, mangroves, and holding pond area were partially restored.

Panje is the last surviving wetland of Uran.
