= Rambhau Mandlik =

Rambhau Mandlik (Marathi: रामभाऊ मंडलिक) (1 July 1881 – 30 August 1958) was a freedom fighter and a political leader in what would later be the Indian state of Maharashtra.

== Personal background ==
Mandlik was born and brought up in Raigad, in Pen, India. His father, Narayan was a radical nationalist and a journalist. He matriculated in an early English school in Pen and went to Fergusson College, Pune, where he earned Bachelor's degree with majors in Roman History, Sanskrit and Jurisprudence. Due to his refusal to apologize for his radical views, he could not become Barrister.

== Professional background ==
Since childhood, Mandlik inherited revolutionary ideology from his father. During his time at the Fergusson College, he was greatly influenced by Lokmanya Tilak, contemporary leader of Indian struggle for independence. Mandlik participated as Tilak's private secretary in the national congress at Surat in 1907

Soon after his graduation, Mandlik became editor of radical nationalist newspaper "Vihari", upon Tilak's recommendation. Mandlik founded and edited a popular weekly in Raigad District called, "Kolaba Samachar". It became a powerful forum for public welfare. Rambhau courageously used it to consistently fight against all forms of injustice.

Mandlik was a disciple of Lokmanya Tilak and acted as his private secretary in the national conference at Surat in 1907. British government banned and confiscated all copies of the two biographies, one on Anne Bezant and another one on Kamal Pasha published by Mandlik. Mandlik was convicted under sedition for his nationalist and revolutionary writings. He was jailed for two years and fined RS 1000. After his release, Mandlik went to Japan to seek armed assistance for Indian struggle from Indian ex-pat population but wasn't successful. By this time, focus of Indian resistance had shifted from armed resistance to non-violent movements and Mandlik aligned himself with Indian National Congress. He had significant differences with Gandhi's style of leadership and approach to politics which he viewed as unrealistic and impractical. This led to his departure from Congress in 1937 and he became involved in Savarakar's Hindu Mahasabha. He was President of Maharashtra Hindu Sabha from 1946 to 1954.

From 1937 to 1954, Mandlik acted as legislator in the state assembly, representing Pen/Kolaba and Pune constituencies. Mandlik worked tirelessly on the wide range of public interest issues. He was renowned for asking by far the most number of questions to the ministers during the sessions of assembly.
