= Mora, Maharashtra =

Mora Mora koliwada
- Town
- Location in Maharashtra, India
- Coordinates: 18.889°N 72.934°E
- Country: India
- State: Maharashtra
- District: Raigad
- Elevation: 9 m (30 ft)

Languages
  - Official: Marathi
- Time zone: UTC+5:30 (IST)
- PIN: 400702
- Telephone code: 022
- ISO 3166 code: IN-MH
- Vehicle registration: MH-06

Mora is a port serving the town of Uran in Navi Mumbai in Maharashtra, India. Ferry services connect to Ferry Wharf and Gateway of India in Mumbai. Occupation of the inhabitants is mostly fishing related, where in women mostly sell fish in Mumbai, Mora and Uran. Men especially have shifted to various other professions due to increased literacy and financial risks involved in fishing. Most of the population is Hindu, the town is well known for its temples in particular the Sai Baba temple near the ferry booking office which observes a number of devotees from nearby region mostly gathering on Thursdays.

Situated across the wharf, the main road passes through the plant name Grindwell Norton Limited and ends at Naval Station Karanja Gate which is highly restricted defence zone. Besides there is an ancient Hindu temple functional were people had a very strong belief and faith name Shri Umberdev Mandir which was built in the year 1835. This temple is also known for its Annual Festival (village carnival) called Jatra which is celebrated every year in the month of May. The only bank nearby village is Syndicate Bank which is one of the oldest and major commercial bank located at Uran-Mora road near Ekvira Devi Mandir. Mora has Police station near the Jetty overlooking the bay of Bombay.
