= Thakri dialect =

Dialect of Marathi

Thakri, or Thakuri is a dialect of Marathi spoken by about 100,000 people of the Adivasi community in Raigad district, Maharashtra, India. It has traces of a non-Marathi substratum. It is classified as a part of the Maharashtrian Konkani group of dialects according to ISO 639.
