= Agri (caste) =

Hindu caste

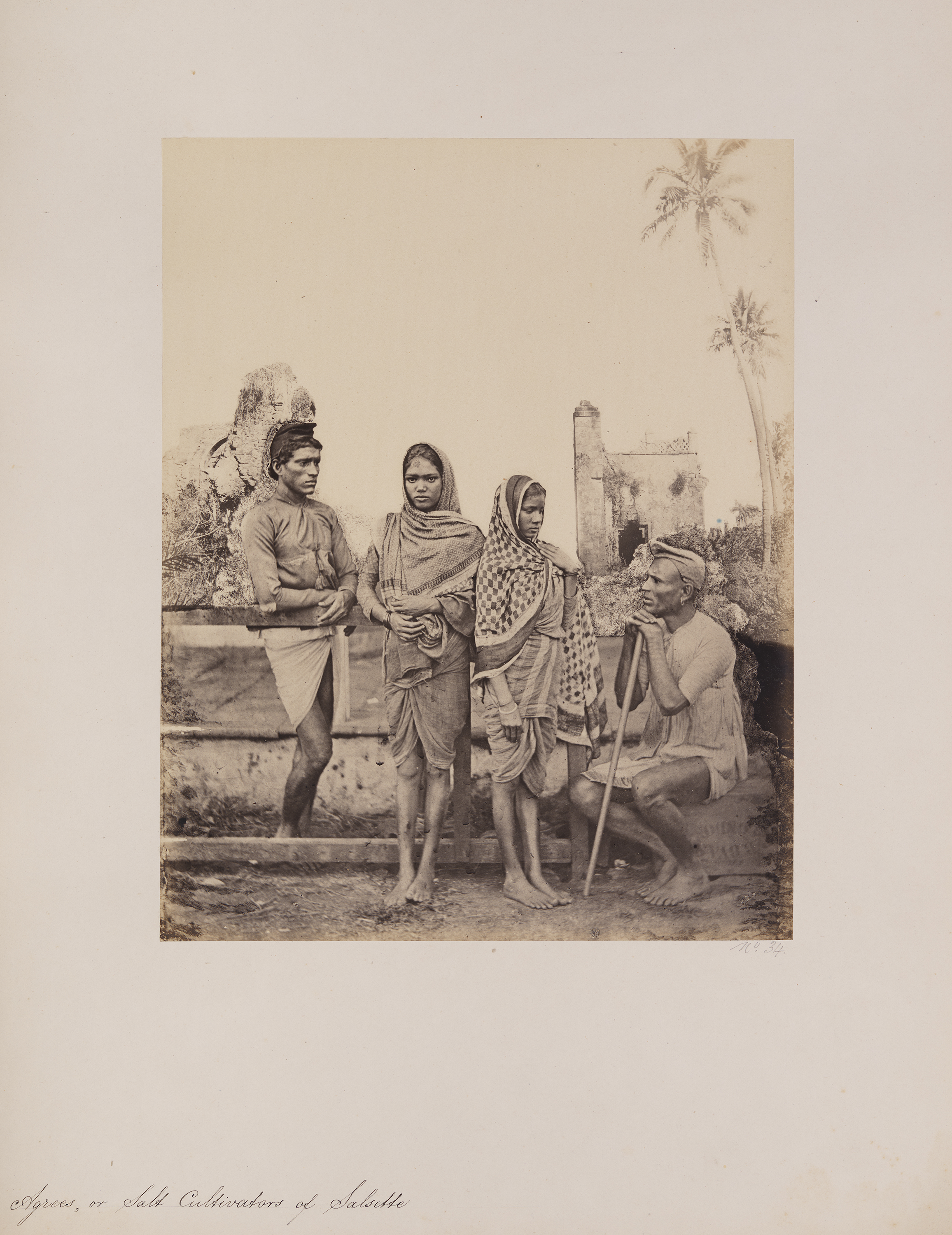
Agrees, or Salt Cultivators of Salsette

The Agri or Aagri are a mostly Hindu caste found in Mumbai (Bombay), Thane District, Raigad District & Palghar district of Konkan division, Maharashtra, India. In 1931, the Agri population numbered around 416,000 in India. They are mainly involved in fishing, salt making, and rice farming. They speak the Agri dialect of Maharashtri Konkani and write in the Devanagari script. They are Hindus, worship all the Hindu deities and observe Hindu festivals such as Holi, Ganesh Chaturthi, Dussera, Diwali, Hanuman Jayanti, Datta Jayanti, Shiv Jayanti and others.

== See also ==
- Agaria
