= St. Francis Xavier's Church, Giriz =

Church in Giriz, India

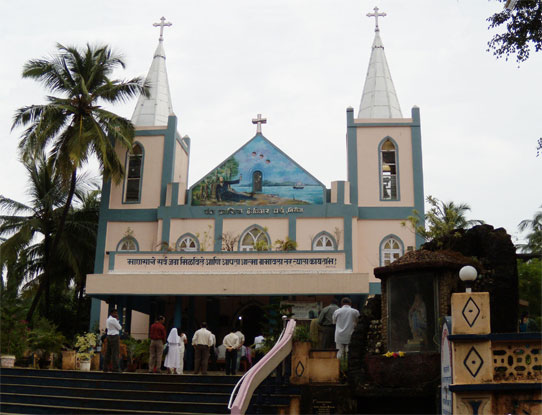
St. Francis Xavier's Church, Giriz

St. Francis Xavier's Church, Giriz is a Catholic church in the village of Giriz in the coastal town of Vasai in the city of Vasai-Virar in Maharashtra State, India. It serves as the parish church for Giriz, within the Diocese of Vasai.

== History ==
The church was built in the early 20th century for the Catholics of Giriz, who were till then parishioners of the vast parish of St. Thomas, Sandor and Our Lady of Mercy, Merces. The Archbishop of Damaun recognized the hardship faced by the people of Giriz in attending services at St. Thomas, Sandor and Merces especially during monsoons.

A new church was commissioned and the foundation laid on 14 February 1917. The village folk themselves completed construction a year later "without foreign aid". The patron saint of the new church was St. Francis Xavier (7 April 1506 – 3 December 1552), and parishioners continue to celebrate the feast of St. Francis Xavier every year on 3 December. The church completed, Giriz became an independent parish with Fr. Augusto D’Souza, who had supervised the construction of the church from inception, as the first parish priest.

In 1968 the church and parish celebrated its Golden Jubilee. The vicar Fr. Francis Gratian Monteiro built a porch and the Marshal Pereira Community Hall to accommodate the growing population of Catholics. In 1977, Vicar Fr. Dominic Pereira built a spacious extension of the church and a new parochial house on the first floor both with German and diocesan aid and in May 1981 the two spires of the church were replaced.
