= Maharashtri Konkani =

Konkani dialects

Maharashtri Kokani
- Konkan Marathi
- महाराष्ट्रीय कोकणी
- Native to: India
- Region: Konkan
- Native speakers: (2.4 million cited 2001 census)
- Language family: Indo-European: Indo-Iranian; Indo-Aryan; Southern Zone; Marathi–Konkani; Maharashtri Kokani
- Dialects: Thakri, Parabhi, Koli, Kiristanva, Kunbi, Agri Dhangari, Karadhi, Sangameshwari, Bankoti, Maoli
- Writing system: Devanagari (official), Latin, Kannada, Malayalam and Persian

Language codes
- ISO 639-3: knn
- Glottolog: konk1267

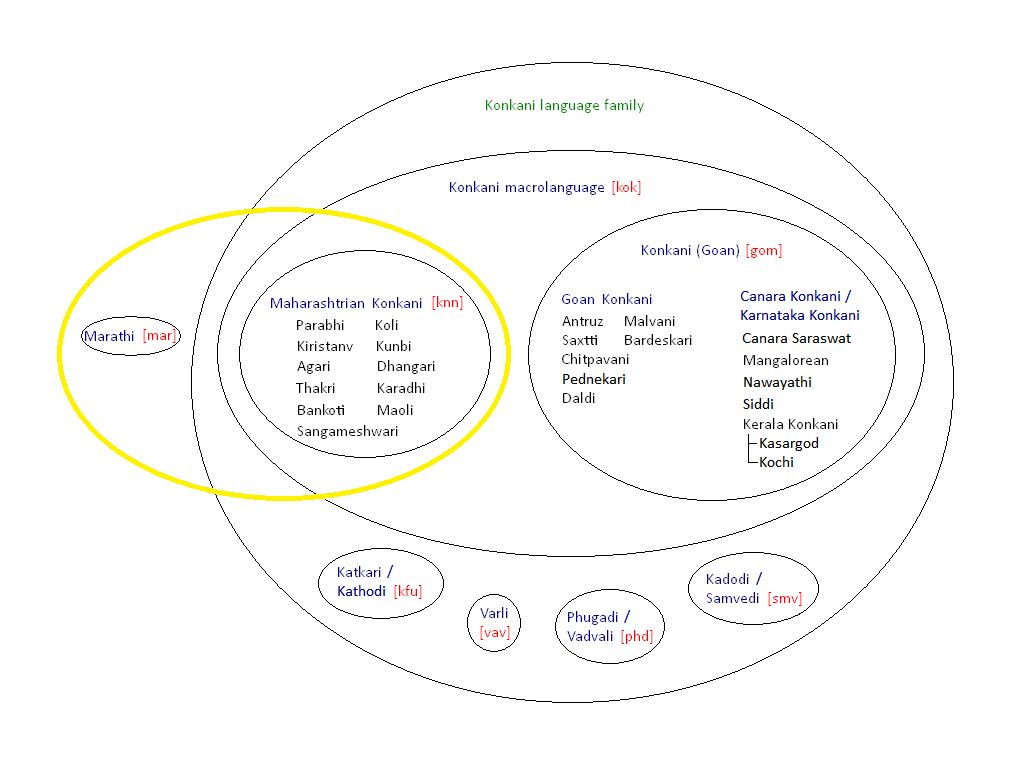
Venn diagram of the ISO designations of the Konkani languages

Maharashtri Konkani, or Konkan Marathi, is a group of Marathi-Konkani dialects, spoken in the Konkan, that differ from Marathi. George Abraham Grierson, a British Indian linguist of the colonial era referred to these dialects as the Konkan Standard of Marathi in order to differentiate it inside the Konkani language group.

== See also ==
- Malvani language
