= Vasai =

City in Maharashtra, India

Vasai Baçaim
- City
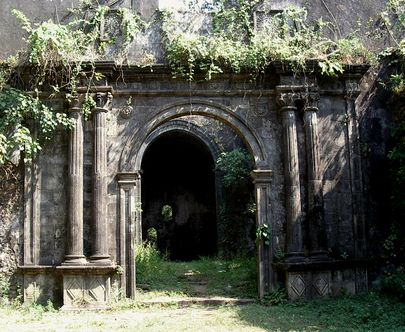
- Vasai Fort (entrance)

- Location of Vasai in Maharashtra, India Vasai (India)
- Coordinates: 19.47°N 72.8°E
- Country: India
- State: Maharashtra
- District: Palghar
- Division: Konkan (North)
- Named for: Vasa Konkani tribes
- Vidhan Sabha constituency: Vasai (Vidhan Sabha) Constituency

Government
  - Type: Municipal Corporation
  - Body: Vasai-Virar Municipal Corporation
- Elevation: 11 m (36 ft)

Population (2007)
  - Total: 49,337
- Demonym(s): Vasaikar in Marathi & Konkani, Basseinite in English.
- Time zone: UTC+5:30 (IST)
  - Summer (DST): UTC+5:30 (Not observed)
- PIN code(s): 401 201 to 401 203
- Area code: +91-0250-XXX XXXX
- Vehicle registration: MH-48
- Official language: Marathi
- Other language(s): Samvedi, Agri, Vadavli, Konkani & Koli
- Website: vvcmc.in, www.vasai.com/content/article/emergency-numbers

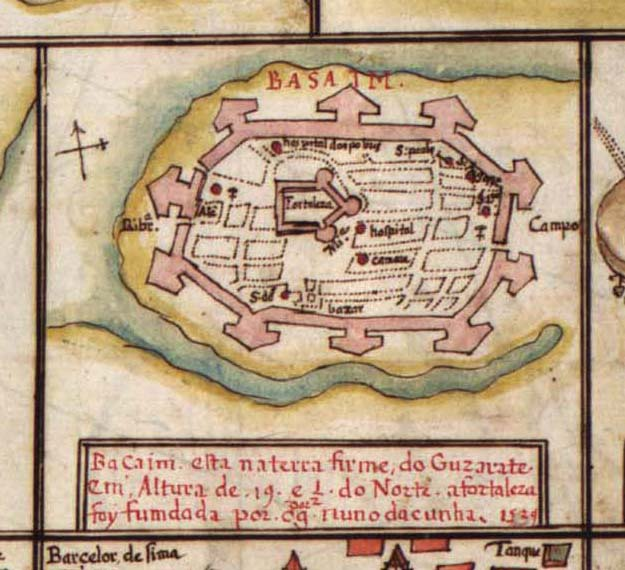
Map of Bassein (Vasai) (c. 1539)

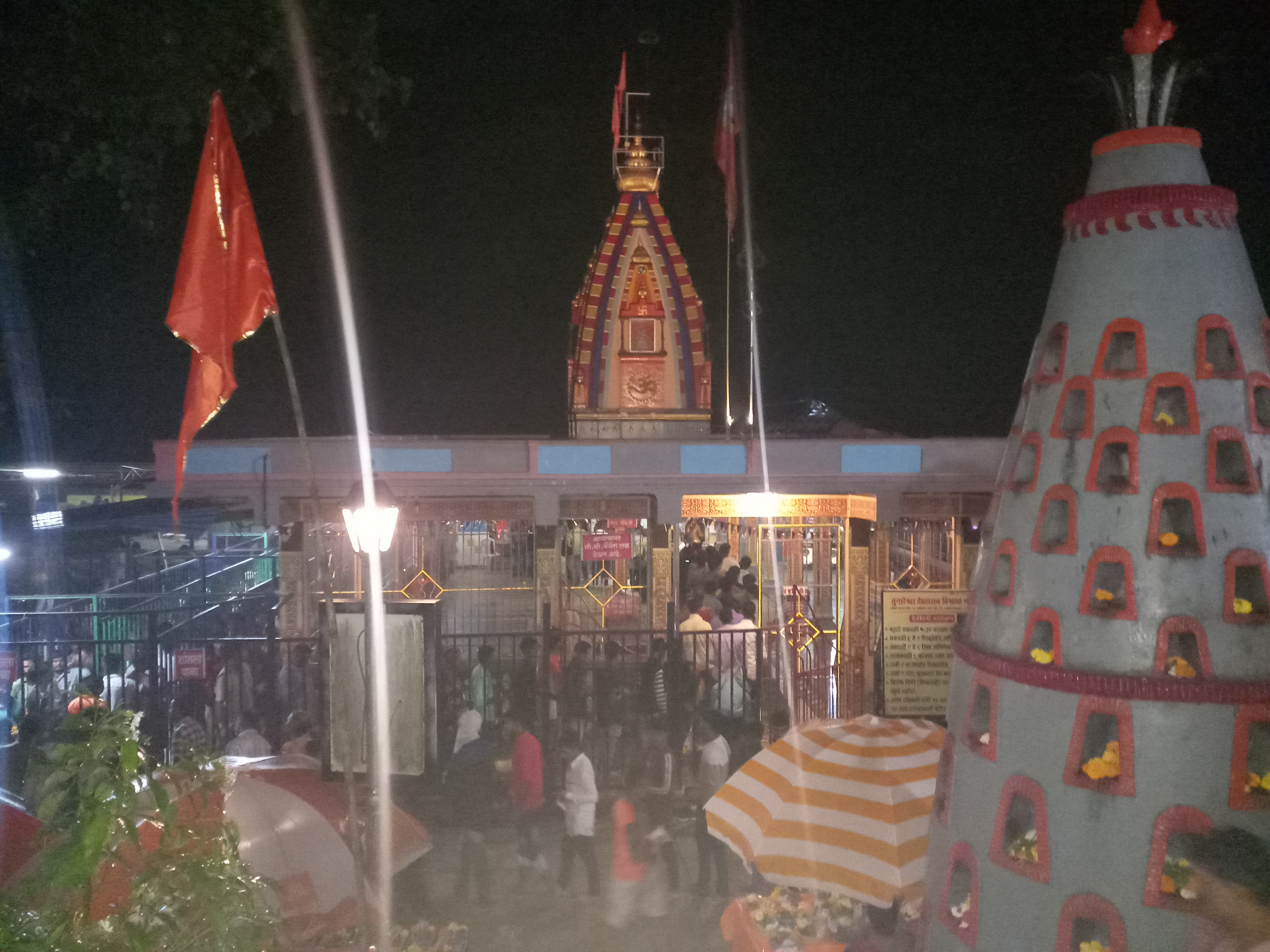
Tungareshwar Temple at Vasai, Mumbai, in 2019

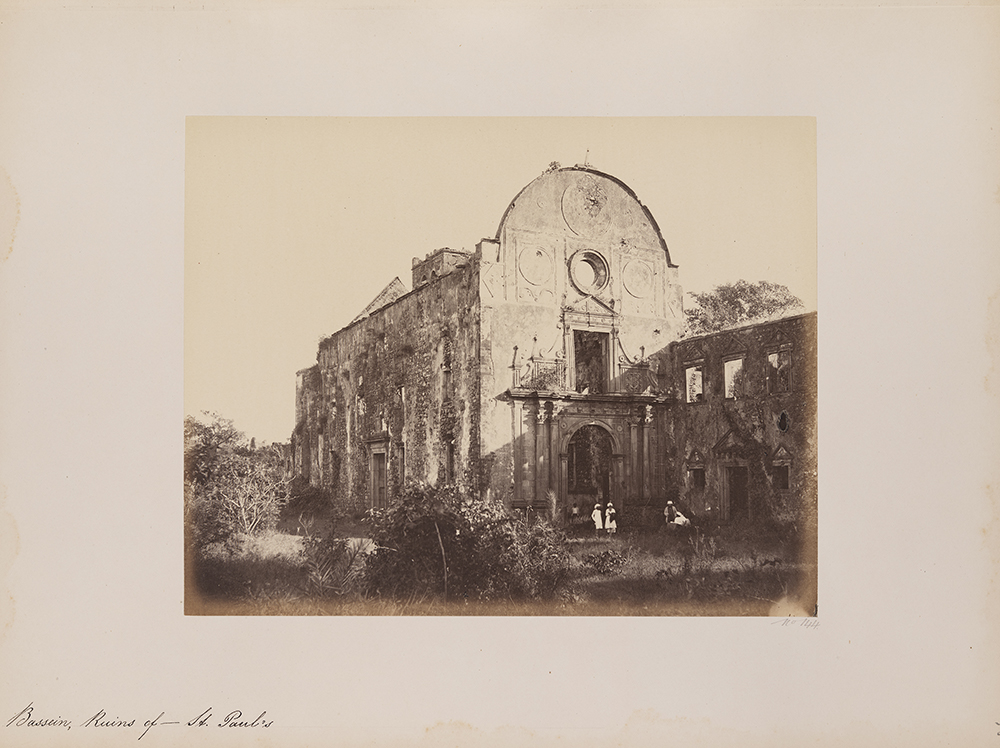
Ruins of St. Paul's (c. 1855–1862)

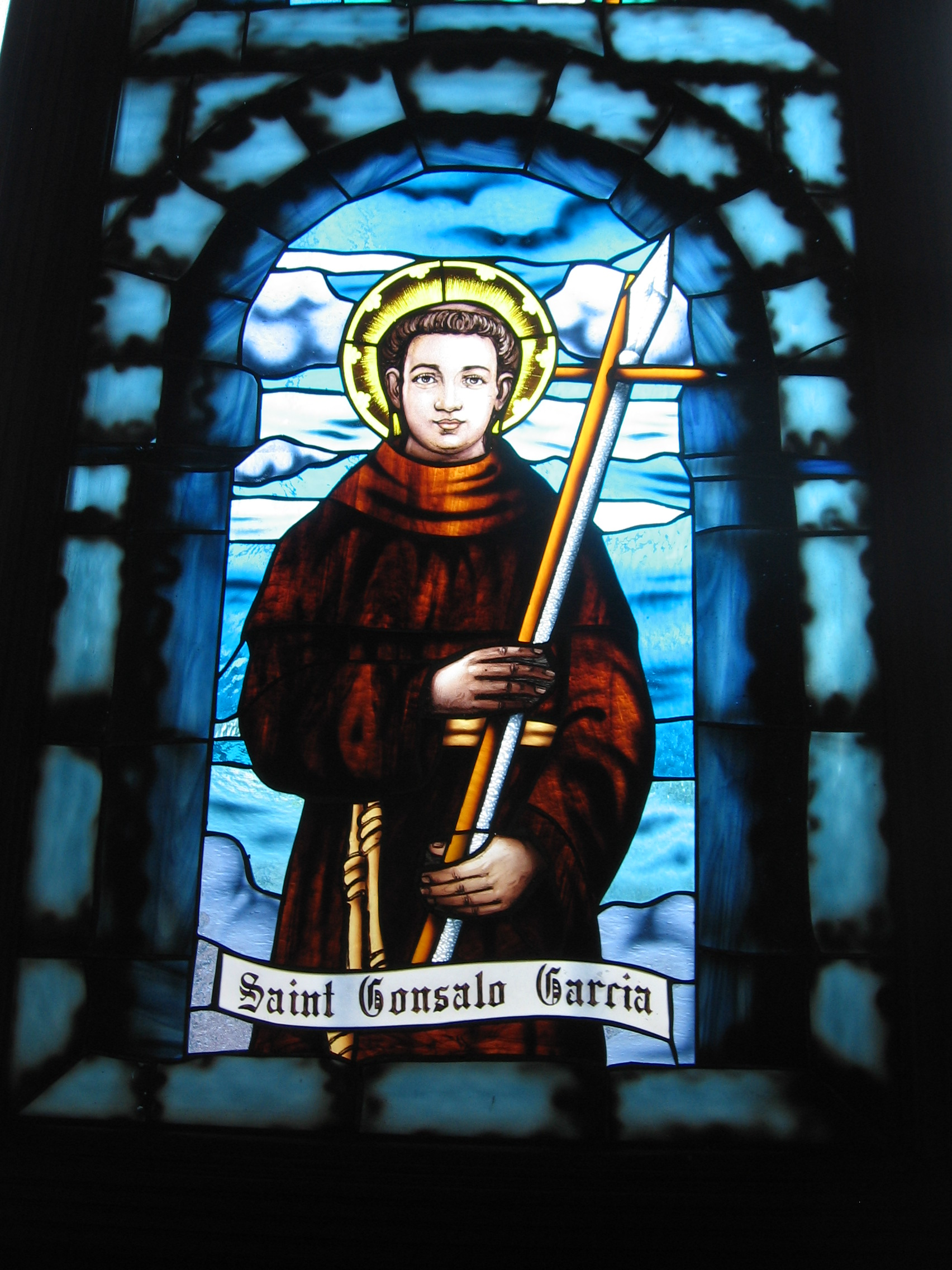
St. Gonsalo (1st Indian-born saint)

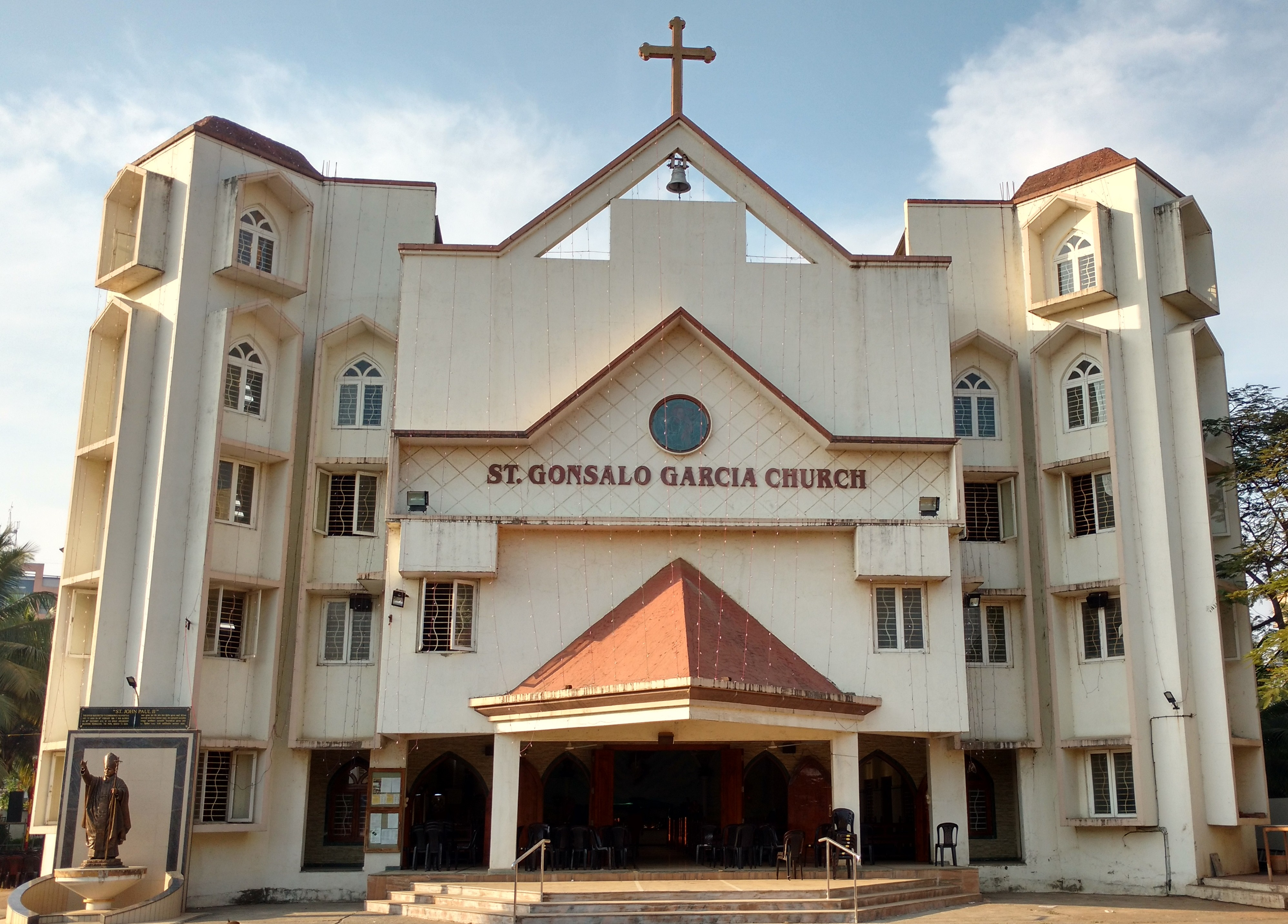
Saint Gonsalo Garcia Church

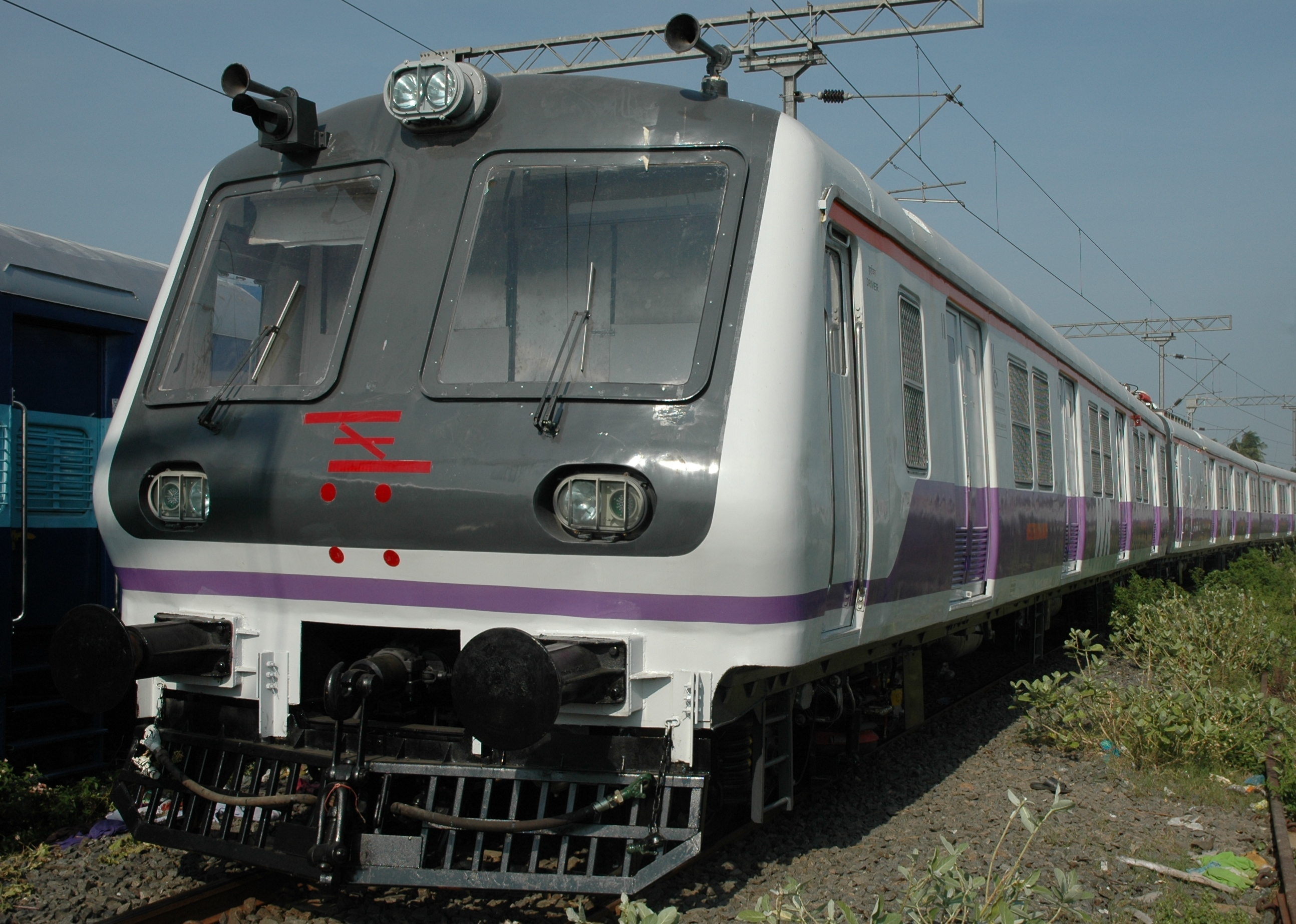
Mumbai Suburban Local Train

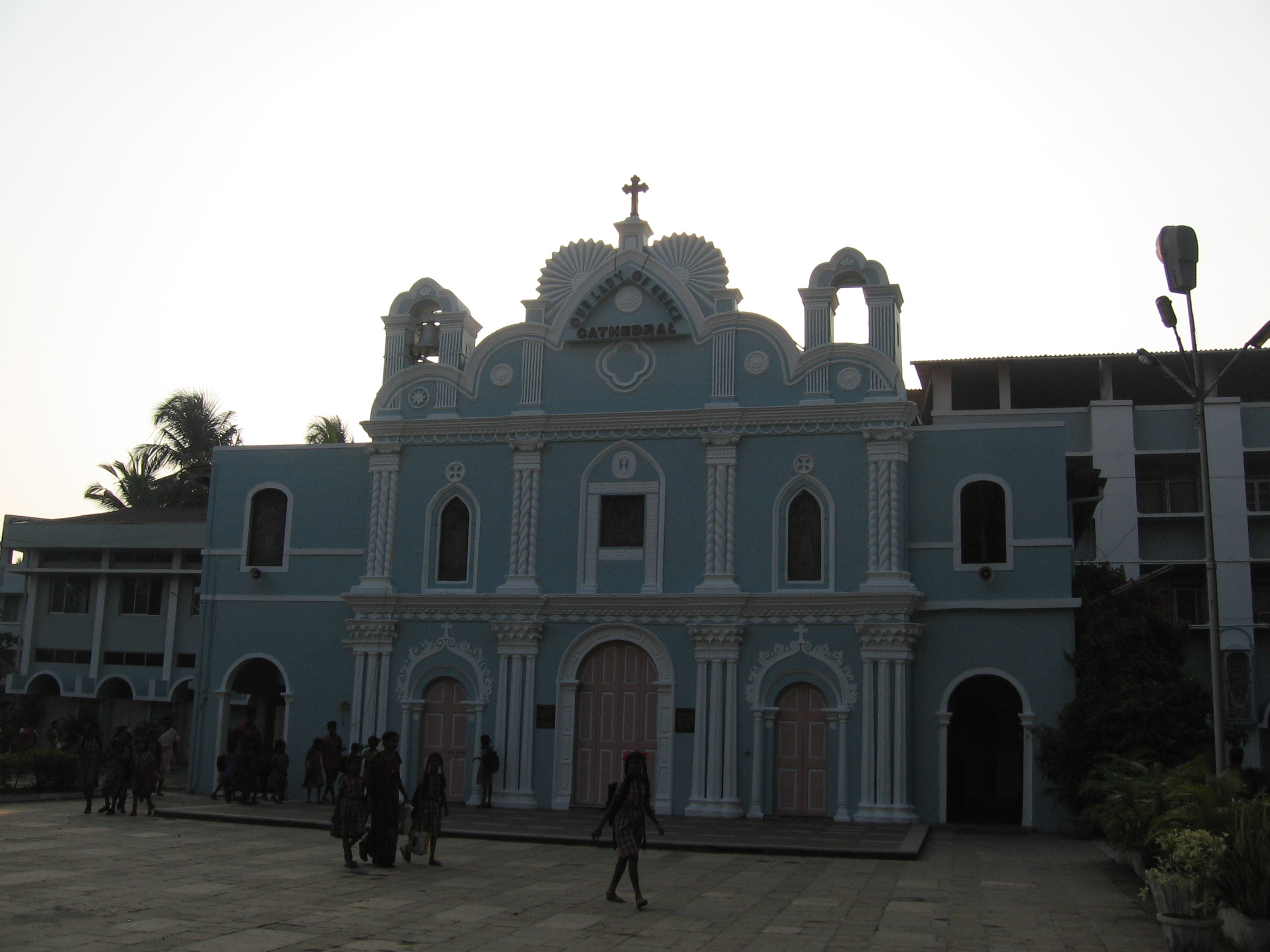
Roman Catholic Diocese of Vasai

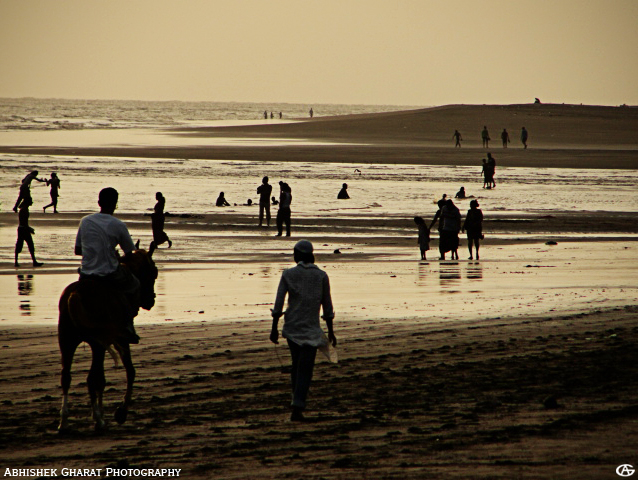
Horse riding at Suruchi Beach

Vasai (Konkani and Marathi pronunciation: [ʋəsəi]; Portuguese: Baçaim; British English: Bassein; formerly and alternatively Marathi; Bajipur) is a historical place and city located in the Palghar district; it was partitioned out of the Thane district in August 2014. It also forms a part of the Vasai-Virar twin cities in the Konkan division, Maharashtra, India, and comes under the police jurisdiction of the Mira-Bhayander, Vasai-Virar Police Commissionerate.

The Portuguese in Goa and Damaon built Fort Bassein to defend their colony and participate in the lucrative spice trade and the silk route that converged in the area. Much of Portuguese Bombay and Bassein was seized by Marathas under Peshwa rule, at the Battle of Vasai in 1739.

The British East India Company at Bombay then took the area from the Maratha Empire in 1780, following the First Anglo-Maratha War.

== Etymology ==
The present name Vasai is derived from the Sanskrit word Waas, meaning 'dwelling' or 'residence'. The name was changed to Basai, which was named under Bahadur Shah of Gujarat after the Gujarat Sultanate took over the region. This is also the first Latinized record of the name, which was spelled as Baxay by Barbosa (1514). The name was short-lived as it was changed under Portuguese rule, approximately two decades later, to Baçaim (also the first official Latin name) following the signing of the Treaty of Vasai in 1534. This name was again changed after over 200 years to Bajipur after the Maratha Empire took over the region. This name was also short-lived as after the capture of Bajipur by the British, the name was changed yet again to Bassein. During this same time, Bombay took over Bassein as the dominant economic power in the region. The town was renamed to Vasai, the Marathi name for the region, following the devolution of the British Raj in India.

=== Demonym ===
English: Bassein; Portuguese: Baçaim), Vasai is called Vasaikar in Marathi, in which the suffix "kar" means 'resident of'. The term had been in use since the official renaming of Bassein to Vasai. The Vasaikar diaspora outside of Maharashtra state, as well as outside of India, often refer to themselves as from Mumbai, due to its international recognition, and Vasai being located within the Mumbai Metropolitan Region, near the edge of suburban Mumbai.

== History ==
=== Pre-Portuguese era ===
The history of Vasai dates back to the ancient Puranic ages. Vasai was a trading ground for many Greek, Arab, Persian, and Roman traders and merchants, who would enter through the west coast of India. The Greek merchant Cosma Indicopleustes is known to have visited the areas around Vasai in the 6th century, and the Chinese traveler Xuanzang later in June or July 640. According to historian José Gerson da Cunha, during this time, Bassein and its surrounding areas appeared to have been ruled by the Chalukya dynasty of Karnataka. Until the 11th century, several Arabian geographers had mentioned references to towns nearby Vasai, like Thana and Sopara, but no references had been made to Vasai. Vasai was later ruled by the Silhara dynasty of Konkan, and eventually passed to the Seuna dynasty. It was the head of district under the Seuna (1184–1318). Later it was conquered by the Gujarat Sultanate, where it was named Basai. A few years later Barbosa (1514) described it under the name Baxay (pronounced Basai) as a town with a good seaport belonging to the King of Gujarat.

In 1295, the Italian explorer Marco Polo passed through Vasai.

=== Portuguese era ===
The Portuguese first reached the west coast of India when the Portuguese explorer Vasco da Gama landed at Calicut in 1498. According to historian Manuel de Faria e Sousa, the coast of Basai was first visited by the Portuguese in 1509, when Francisco de Almeida on his way to Diu captured a Muslim ship in the harbour of Bombay, with 24 citizens of the Gujarat Sultanate aboard.

To the Portuguese, Basai was an important trading centre located on the Arabian Sea. They saw it as a vital service station that would give them access to global sea routes and goods such as salt, fish, timber and mineral resources. They wanted to build a shipyard to manufacture ships and use the fertile land to grow rice, sugarcane, cotton, betel nuts and other crops to trade globally.

The presence of the Portuguese significantly shaped the region into what it is today.

==== Treaty of Vasai (Bassein; 1534) ====
In 1530 the Portuguese, under António da Silveira, took advantage of its strong navy and pillaged and burnt the village of Vasai (Basai). The army of Gujarat Sultanate was not strong enough for the Portuguese forces and, despite resistance, the Sultan of Gujarat was eventually defeated. In 1531 António set fire to Basai yet again as punishment for the Sultan for not ceding Diu, a vital island that would protect trade in the region. In 1533, Diogo (Heitor) da Silveira set fire to the western coast leading from Bandora through Thana and Basai to Surat.

Portuguese General Nuno da Cunha discovered that the son of Meliqueaz, the governor of Diu, Malik Tokan was fortifying Basai with 14,000 men. Seeing this fortification as a threat, Nano da Cunha assembled a fleet of 150 ships with 4000 men and sailed to north of Basai. Upon seeing the naval superiority of the Portuguese, Malik Tokan attempted to initiate a peace agreement with Nano da Cunha. Upon rejection, Malik Tokan was forced to fight against the Portuguese. Despite bringing fewer soldiers, the Portuguese managed to kill most of the enemy while losing only a few of their own.

The Treaty of Bassein was signed by Bahadur Shah of Gujarat and the Kingdom of Portugal on 23 December 1534 while on board the galleon São Mateus. Based on the terms of the agreement, the Portuguese Empire gained control of the village of Basai as well as its territories, islands and seas including Bombay. The village was renamed to Baçaim and became the northern capital of Portuguese territories in India.

Garcia de Sá was later appointed as the first Captain (governor) of Baçaim by his brother-in-law Nuno da Cunha in 1536, who ruled until 1548 when the governorship was passed onto Jorge Cabral. The first cornerstone for the Bassein Fort was laid by António Galvão.

Under Portuguese rule, the Fort Bassein was the Northern Court, or 'Corte da Norte', functioning as the headquarters of the Court of the North. Baçaim became the capital of the Northern Province, the most productive village of Portuguese India and became a resort for Portuguese 'fidalgos' (noblemen and wealthy merchants). A great Portuguese person would be called 'Fidalgo ou Cavalheiro de Baçaim' (Nobleman of Baçaim). By 1674, the Portuguese constructed 2 colleges, 4 convent schools and 15 churches in total in Baçaim's territories. For approximately 205 years, the presence of the Portuguese made the surrounding area a vibrant and opulent village.

The local ethnic community were called 'Norteiro' (Northern men), named after the Court of the North functioning out of the fort.

In 1674, about 600 Arab pirates from Muscat entered Baçaim via the west and pillaged the churches in Baçaim. The unexpected attack weakened the Portuguese control outside the fort walls and Maratha warriors stationed in the west isolated them further.

=== Maratha era ===
In the 18th century, Vasai Fort was attacked by the Maratha Empire under Peshwa Baji Rao's brother Chimaji Appa and the Portuguese surrendered on 16 May 1739 after the Battle of Vasai (Baçaim). The Marathas allowed the women and the children of the enemy to leave peacefully. The Portuguese lost a total of 4 main ports, 8 cities, 2 fortified hills, 340 villages and 20 fortresses.

This defeat of the Portuguese, combined with Portuguese royal Catherine of Braganza's wedding dowry of the Seven Islands of Bombay to Charles II of England, led to Bombay overtaking Bajipur (the Maratha name for Vasai) as the dominant economic power in the region.

=== British era ===
With the British ruling the island of Bombay just south of the Vasai Creek, the region's prominence as a trade centre in India became increasingly overshadowed by Bombay.

After the death of Madhavrao I in 1772, his brother Narayan Rao became Peshwa of the Maratha Empire. Narayan Rao was the fifth Peshwa of the Maratha Empire from November 1772 until his murder by his palace guards in August 1773. Narayan Rao's widow, Gangabai, gave birth to a posthumous son, who was legal heir to the throne. The newborn infant was named Sawai Madhavrao. Twelve Maratha chiefs, led by Nana Fadnavis, directed an effort to name the infant as the new Peshwa and rule under him as regents.

Raghunathrao, unwilling to give up his position of power, sought help from the British at Bombay and signed the Treaty of Surat on 6 March 1775. According to the treaty, Raghunathrao ceded the territories of Salsette and Vasai to the British, along with part of the revenues from the Surat and Bharuch districts. In return, the British promised to provide Raghunathrao with 2,500 soldiers. The treaty was later annulled by the British Supreme Council of Bengal and replaced by the Treaty of Purandar on 1 March 1776. Raghunathrao was pensioned and his cause abandoned, but the revenues of the Salsette and Bharuch districts were retained by the British. The British Bombay Presidency rejected this new treaty and gave refuge to Raghunathrao. In 1777, Nana Fadnavis violated his treaty with the British Supreme Council of Bengal by granting the French a port on west coast. The British retaliated by sending a force towards Pune.

Following a treaty between France and the Maratha Empire in 1776, the British Bombay Presidency decided to invade and reinstate Raghunathrao. They sent a force under Colonel Egerton, but were defeated. The British were forced to sign the Treaty of Wadgaon on 16 January 1779, a victory for the Marathas. Reinforcements from northern India, commanded by Colonel Thomas Goddard, arrived too late to save the Bombay force. The British Governor-General in the British Bengal Presidency, Warren Hastings, rejected the treaty on the grounds that the Bombay officials had no legal power to sign it. He ordered Goddard to secure British interests in the area. Goddard captured Bassein on 11 December 1780. The city was renamed from Bajipur to Bassein under British rule.

In 1801, Yashwantrao Holkar rebelled against the rival factions of the Maratha Empire. He defeated the combined forces of the Daulat Rao Scindia and Peshwa Baji Rao II in the Battle of Poona and captured Poona (Pune). Peshwa Baji Rao II eventually took refuge in Bassein, where the British had a stronghold. The Bassein Fort played a strategic role in the First Anglo-Maratha War.

==== Treaty of Bassein (1802) ====
The Treaty of Bassein (1802) was signed on 31 December 1802 between the British East India Company and Baji Rao II, the Maratha Peshwa of Pune (Poona), in India after the Battle of Poona. The treaty was a decisive step in the dissolution of the Maratha Empire and the expansion of British rule over the Indian subcontinent.

== Industrialization ==
The eastern part of Vasai is highly industrialized, with small- and medium-scale units producing a wide variety of goods. Contributed by more affordable housing and its close proximity to Mumbai, Vasai has maintained a high population growth rate since the 1980s. There are about 12,000 industrial units spread over the eastern part of Vasai.

== Transport ==
The local railway station is known as Vasai Road. It is a major railway station which bypasses Mumbai and connects the trains coming from Vadodara to Konkan Railway and Pune Junction railway station and further towards cities of Bengaluru and Hyderabad. The Vasai-Virar Municipal Corporation buses run on all major routes and State Transport buses provide long-distance travel to and from Vasai. Besides that, auto rickshaws are the main source of transport in the region. Indian Railways introduced a local train service in the Mumbai Metropolitan Region in 1867. The upgraded local train runs between Virar and Churchgate and has a frequency of a train every 4 minutes.

== Tourism ==
The Vasai Fort, originally built in 1184, is a major tourist attraction in the region. The Archaeological Survey of India has started restoration work of the fort, although the quality of the work has been severely criticized by conservation activists. In August 2010 a wall of the fort collapsed, raising questions about the quality of the work.

There are also multiple well-known religious sites including the Vajreshwari Temple, St. Francis Xavier's Church, Giriz, Tungareshwar Mahadev Temple, Jeevdani Mata Temple and the Datta Mandir of Dongri. There are various festivals tourists come to visit.

There are famous and peaceful beaches are also located such as Suruchi beach, Bena beach, Rangaon beach, Bhuigaon beach, Kalamb beach, Rajodi beach, Navapur, etc.

== Education ==
- St Gonsalo Garcia College
- Carmelite Convent English High School, Sandor, Vasai
- Holy Family Convent School & Junior College
- J.B. Ludhani High School
- G J Vartak Vidyalaya, Vasai West
- I Global School
- Mount Carmel High School and Junior College
- Nazareth Convent School, Vasai
- Sheth Vidya Mandir English High School and Junior College of Science and Commerce, Vasant Nagari, Vasai
- St. Anne's Convent School, Vasai
- St. Augustines School, Vasai
- St. Xavier's Vasai
- Thomas Baptista Junior College
- Vidya Vikasini English High School & Junior College
- Podar International School

== Use as filming location ==
Vasai gained popularity as a shooting location with international hit song 'Hymn for the Weekend' by British band Coldplay being shot here. According to The Times of India, the video was shot in October 2015 at various Indian cities including Worli Village, Bombay and Kolkata. The fort showcased at the start and in between is the Bassein Fort, also known as Saint Sebastian's Fort, located in Vasai. The video is themed on the Indian festival of Holi. The video was filmed by Ben Mor and was released on 29 January 2016. The video features Beyoncé and Indian actress Sonam Kapoor.

The music video was criticized on Indian social media for its stereotypical portrayal of Indian society and alleged disrespecting of Indian idols on the note of Beyoncé's inappropriate clothing.

The video has over 960 million views on YouTube as of July 2018, becoming the second most-viewed music video for Coldplay (after "Something Just like This").

Another hit song 'Lean On' by EDM group Major Lazer and DJ Snake was shot in Vasai in March 2015. It has more than 2 billion views on YouTube.

The Bassein Fort is also a popular shooting location for Bollywood movies and songs. The Bollywood hit ″Kambakkht Ishq″ from Pyaar Tune Kya Kiya is one of the Bollywood songs. Movies such as Josh, starring Shah Rukh Khan, was shot in St. Francis Xavier's Church, Giriz and at the Bassein Fort and Love Ke Liye Kuch Bhi Karega had a number of scenes from the Bassein Fort. Other films shot here include Khamoshi: The Musical and Ram Gopal Verma's Aag. In April 2017, some scenes from Bhoomi, starring Sanjay Dutt, were shot around 'Parnaka' area in Vasai.

The Madhuban road is also popular. Movies like Munna Michael, Thackeray (film), Zero (2018 film) had few scenes that were shot here.

== Climate ==
Vasai has a tropical climate, specifically a tropical wet and dry climate (Aw) under the Köppen climate classification, with seven months of dryness and peak of rains in July. This moderate climate consists of high rainfall days and very few days of extreme temperatures. The cooler season from December to February is followed by the summer season from March to June. The period from June to about the end of September constitutes the south-west monsoon season, and October and November form the post-monsoon season. The driest days are in winter while the wettest days occur in July.

Between June and September, the south-west monsoon rains lash the region. Pre-monsoon showers are received in May. Occasionally, monsoon showers occur in October and November. The average total annual rainfall averages between 2,000 and 2,500 mm (79 and 98 in). Annually, over 80% of the total rainfall is experienced during June to October. Average humidity is 61-86%, making it a humid climate zone.

The temperature varies from 22–36 °C (72–97 °F). The average temperature is 26.6 °C (79.9 °F), and the average precipitation is 2,434 mm (95.8 in). The average minimum temperature is 22.5 °C (72.5 °F). The daily mean maximum temperature range from 28.4 to 33.4 °C (83.1 to 92.1 °F), while the daily mean minimum temperature ranges from 17.5 to 26.4 °C (63.5 to 79.5 °F). In winter, temperature ranges between 12–25 °C (54–77 °F) while summer temperature ranges from 36–41 °C (97–106 °F).

Climate data for Vasai
Month	Jan	Feb	Mar	Apr	May	Jun	Jul	Aug	Sep	Oct	Nov	Dec	Year
Mean daily maximum °C (°F)	28.4 (83.1)	29.2 (84.6)	31.2 (88.2)	32.7 (90.9)	33.4 (92.1)	32.1 (89.8)	29.6 (85.3)	29.4 (84.9)	29.7 (85.5)	32 (90)	31 (88)	30.2 (86.4)	30.7 (87.4)
Daily mean °C (°F)	22.9 (73.2)	23.8 (74.8)	26.3 (79.3)	28.3 (82.9)	29.9 (85.8)	29.1 (84.4)	27.2 (81.0)	26.9 (80.4)	26.9 (80.4)	27.7 (81.9)	26.4 (79.5)	24.4 (75.9)	26.6 (80.0)
Mean daily minimum °C (°F)	17.5 (63.5)	18.4 (65.1)	21.4 (70.5)	24 (75)	26.4 (79.5)	26.1 (79.0)	24.9 (76.8)	24.5 (76.1)	24.2 (75.6)	23.5 (74.3)	20.9 (69.6)	18.6 (65.5)	22.5 (72.5)
Average rainfall mm (inches)	0.3 (0.01)	0.4 (0.02)	0.0 (0.0)	0.1 (0.00)	11.3 (0.44)	493.1 (19.41)	840.7 (33.10)	585.2 (23.04)	341.4 (13.44)	89.3 (3.52)	9.9 (0.39)	1.6 (0.06)	2,434 (95.8)
Source: Climate-Data.org

== Notable people ==
- Francis D'Britto (1943–2024), an Indian Catholic priest, writer, and environmental activist
- Harshvardhan Joshi, mountaineer
- Gonsalo Garcia, Franciscan lay brother from Portuguese India, and the first Indian-born to attain sainthood
- Suresh Mukund, owner of Kings United

== See also ==
- Bassein Fort
- Battle of Bassein
- INS Bassein
- Military history of Bassein
