= Uran =

- Node of Navi Mumbai
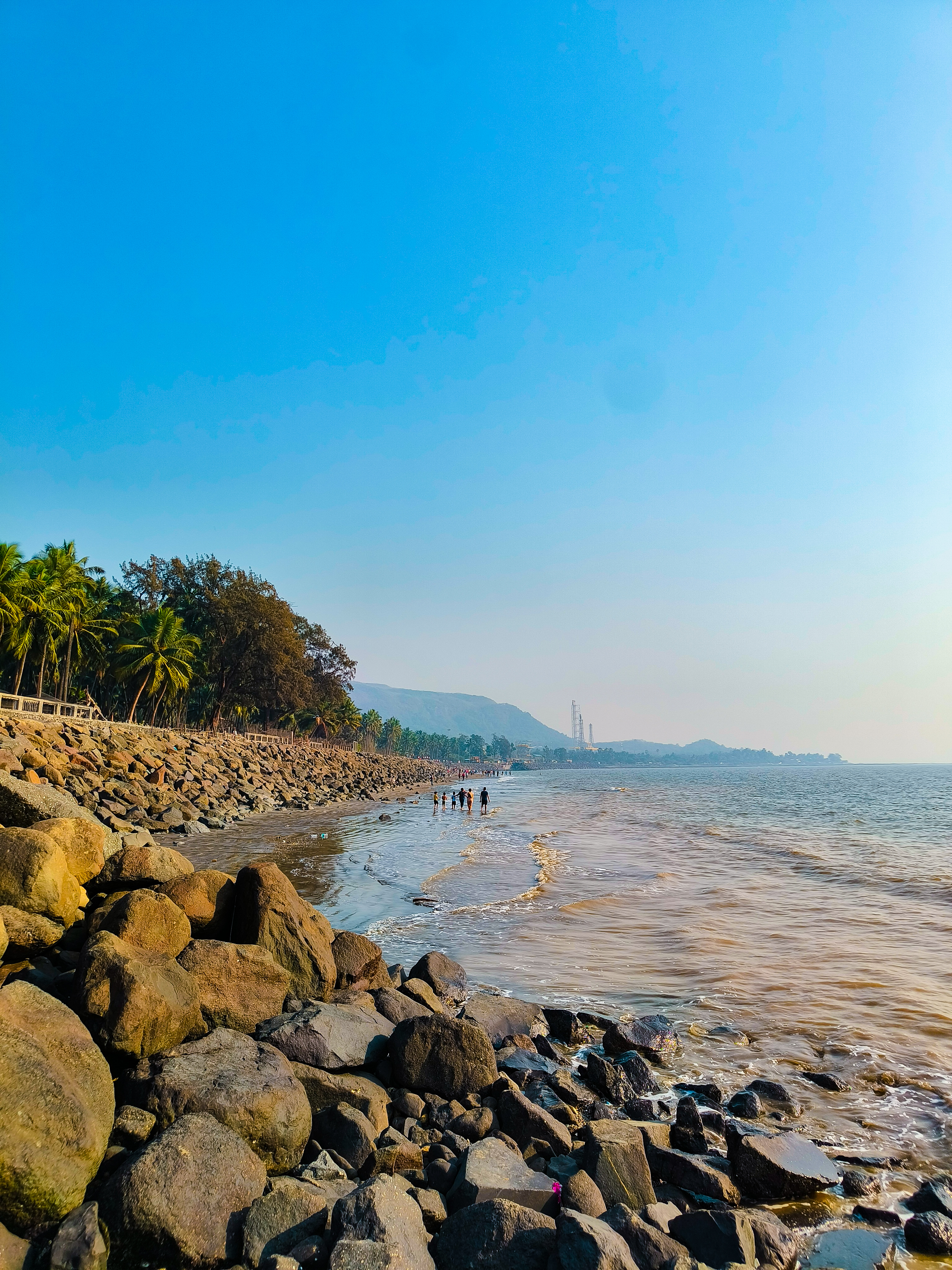
- Nagav Chowpatty
- Interactive map of Uran
- Location within Maharashtra
- Coordinates: 18.89°N 72.95°E
- Country: India
- State: Maharashtra
- City: Navi Mumbai
- District: Raigad
- Taluka: Uran
- Named for: Uranavati

Government
  - Type: Municipal council
  - Body: Uran Municipal Council

Area
  - Total: 17.78 km^{2} (6.86 sq mi)
- Elevation: 21 m (69 ft)

Population (2020)
  - Total: 44,000
  - Density: 2,500/km^{2} (6,400/sq mi)
- Demonym(s): Urankar, Navi Mumbaikar

Languages
  - Official: Marathi
- Time zone: UTC+5:30 (IST)
- PIN: 400702
- Telephone code: 022
- Vehicle registration: MH-46 (Navi Mumbai's Raigad district) and MH-43 (Navi Mumbai's Thane district)

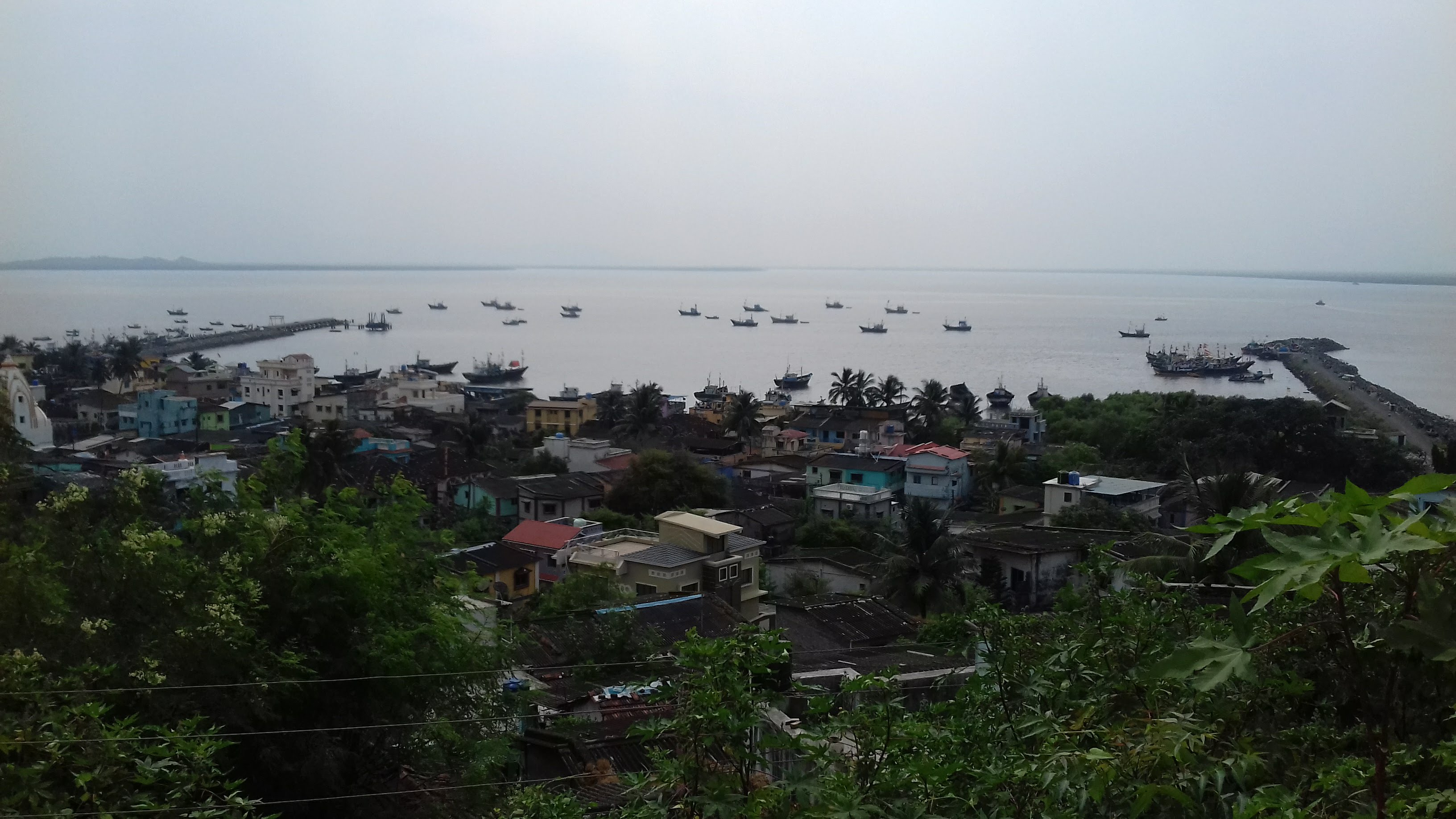
Karanja village when viewed from temple

Uran is a coastal node of Navi Mumbai situated in South Navi Mumbai's Raigad district, Maharashtra in Konkan division. It lies east of Mumbai, across the Dharamtar Creek. Uran is primarily a fishing and agriculture village. The primary languages spoken are Agri and Koli, a dialect of Marathi-Konkani.

== History ==
The node name is derived from the Hindu goddess Uranavati. It was called Uruvan during the rule of Madhavrao I, the fourth Peshwa of the Maratha Empire. Later, the area was named Uran by the Portuguese and Ooran by the British.

Many Indian dynasties have ruled the area. In early history, these included the Maurya Empire, Sātavāhana Empire, Western Kshatrapas, Vākāṭaka Empire, Chalukyas, and Yadavas.

The area around Mumbai, including Uran, was under Portuguese and British rule in the 16th to 19th centuries.

Uran was subject to the Maratha princely states in the Maharashtra. It was the base of the Maratha Sarkhel (Admiral) Kanhoji Angre, who battled European naval interests in the 18th century.

== Geography ==
Uran is located at 18.88°N 72.94°E. Uran has an average elevation of 21 metres (69 ft).

On the tip of a peninsula, Uran is surrounded by sea on three sides. The node of Uran itself is centrally located on the peninsula, flanked by Karanja to the south and Mora village and port to the north.

Uran is home to extensive salt pans, part of a long-standing network of salt manufacturing around Mumbai. The land has been under redevelopment pressure.

The Uran wetlands were once home to many species of birds and reptiles, some critically endangered. The wetlands were developed in 2009 and 2010, leaving only the Panje-Dongri wetlands.

== Economy ==
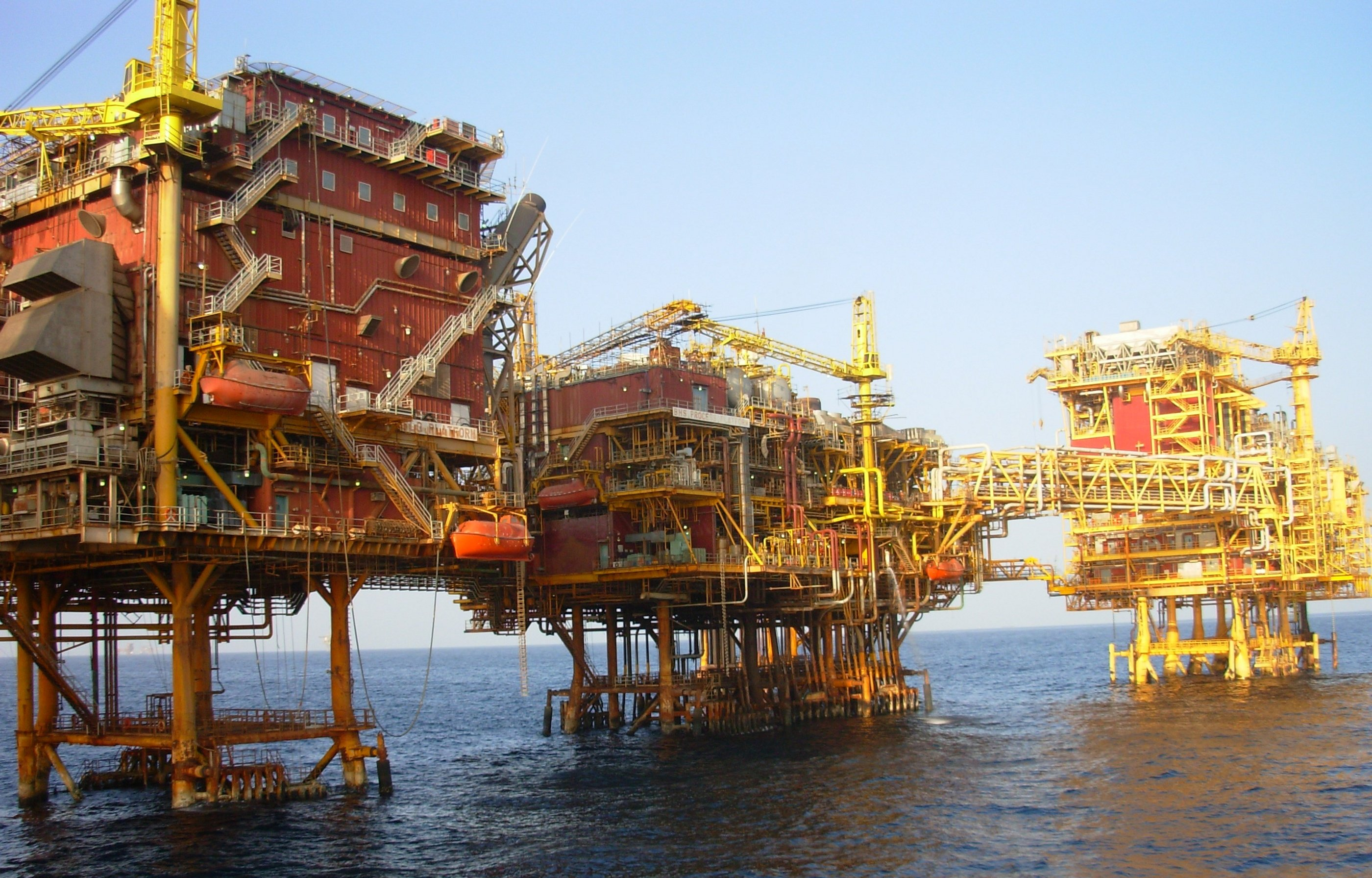
ONGC Oil and Gas Processing Platform in the Bombay High oilfield

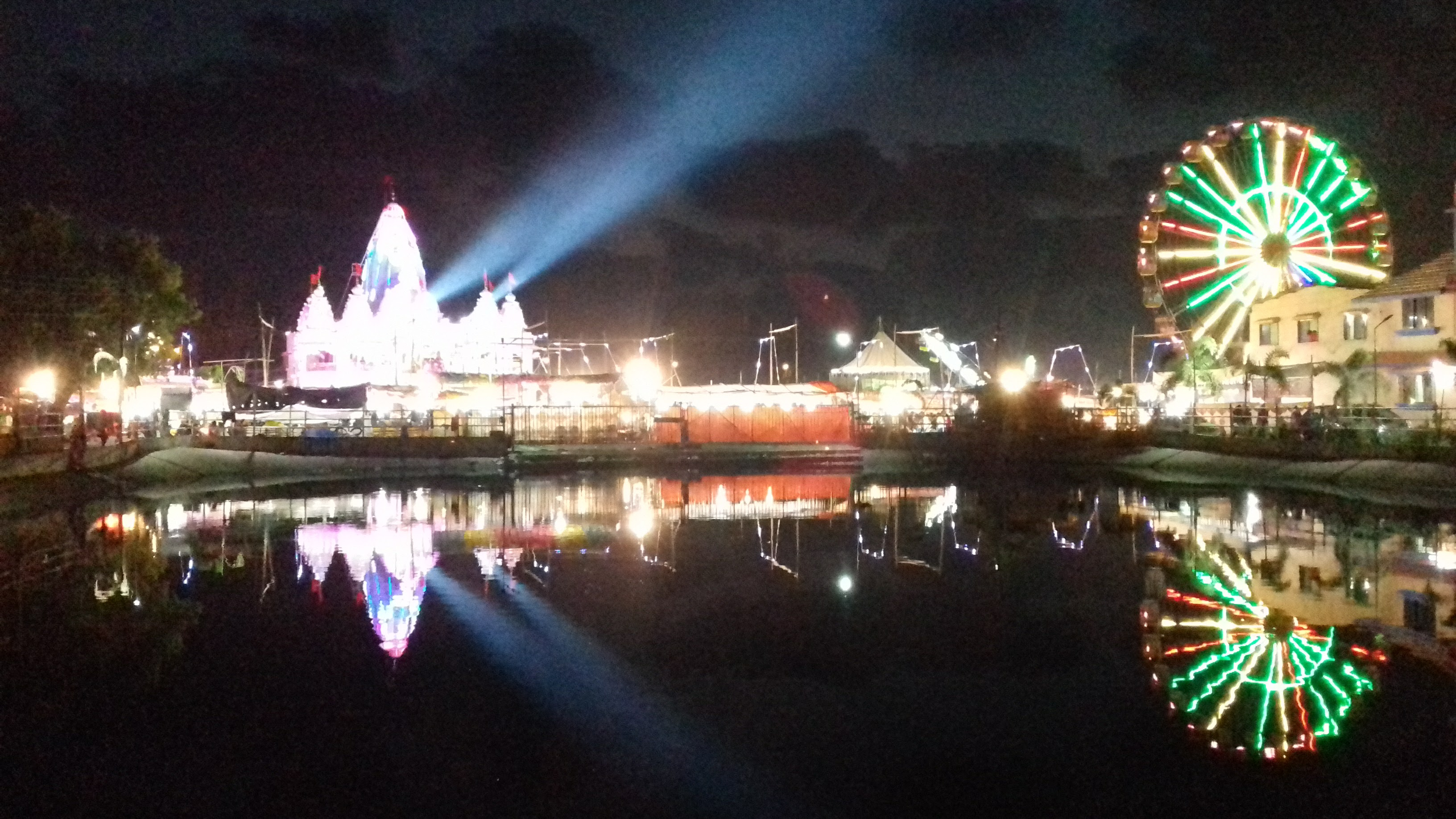
Jaskhar Fair at night in the month of April

Uran is largely a fishing village; 80% of the fish production of Mumbai comes from fishermen from Uran especially the villages of Karanja and Mora.

The second major occupation is farming. Uran contributes to the production of rice in the Raigad district. Raigad is the second largest district in terms of rice production in India.

Shipping, shipbuilding, and port support are major economic factors in Uran. Jawaharlal Nehru Port (JNPT) is the largest container terminal in India. Other container terminals in the town include APM Terminals (formerly GTI) and DP World (formerly the P&O). Salt pan owners revolted against the government decision to build a seaport, but the port has proved to be the main source of income to residents and nearby villages, as major projects and warehouses have opened nearby.

The Indian Navy maintain a naval base near Mora. Security concerns caused the navy to impose sea travel restrictions.

The Oil & Natural Gas Corporation (ONGC) has a plant nearby. GTPS-Maharashtra State Electricity Board is Asia's first power plant run by natural gas.

Other industrial and manufacturing employers Grindwell Norton Limited, NAD, and the Skols Brewery (closed in 2005).

== Transportation ==
Uran railway station serves Uran.

== Demographics ==
In the 2001 India census, Uran had a population of 23,254, which increased to 30,439 by the 2011 census. Males constitute 53% of the population and females 47%. In Uran, 10–11% of the population is 6 years of age or younger.

The average literacy rate in Uran rose from 79% in 2001 to 82% in 2011. Male literacy was 83% in 2001 and 85% in 2011, while female literacy was 75% in 2001 and 79% in 2011. India's national literacy average is 59.5%.

Religion in Uran (2011)
Religion	Percent
Hinduism	72.41%
Islam	19.98%
Buddhism	3.99%
Christianity	1.71%
Jainism	1.56%
Others	0.35%

== Education ==
Uran has several schools, such as Dronagiri High School, St. Mary's JNP School, and Lady Khatun Marium School. It does not have higher education institutes.

== Culture ==
A major tourist attraction in Uran are the three beaches: Pirwadi Beach, Nagav Beach, and Mankeshwar Beach which is frequented by tourists from nearby cities like Panvel, Navi Mumbai and Mumbai. A distant view of South Mumbai is visible from here. A local rural beach Kegav Beach is present, which can also be visited by tourists, and tourists do visit this beach too, but mostly it remains isolated. In totality, node has four beaches.

Ransai Dam is a destination in Uran. It is located near Dighode Village.

An old military fort named Dronagiri is located just beside the ONGC plant on the top of the Dronagiri mountain. This was a Maratha fort for a short period before passing into possession of the Portuguese, according to the locals. Entry has been banned for security reasons.

Khopate Village: Khopate Village is popular for Dashami Festival which is celebrated on behalf of Saint Gopalkaka Maharaj.

Dronagiri Deul: A view from the top of the mountain where the temple of Dronagiri Devi is situated.

There is bird watching at the Panje-Funde wetlands.
