= Agri dialect =

Agri or Aagri (Marathi: आगरी) is a dialect of Marathi which is written in Devanagari script and is spoken by members of the Agri (caste). Although it is commonly used for a comedic effect in marathi comedy shows, but it is not merely the language of humour but also the distinct dialect closely related to Koli Konkani, and the Aagri people speak it on a day-to-day basis. Until the late 20th century, it was an oral dialect and was passed down from one generation to the next. It is spoken in many cities such as Mumbai (Bombay), Thana (Trombay), Raigad (Colaba), Bhiwandi, Vasai (Bassein), Palghar, Valsad & Nashik.
