= Pen, India =

- -Town; Mumbai Metropolitan City
- Location in Maharashtra, India Pen, India (India)
- Coordinates: 18.75°N 73.08°E
- Country: India
- State: Maharashtra
- District: Raigad

Government
  - Type: Municipal corporation
- Elevation: 18 m (59 ft)

Population (2011)
  - Total: 37,852

Languages
  - Official: Marathi
- Time zone: UTC+5:30 (IST)
- PIN: 402107
- Telephone code: 02143
- ISO 3166 code: IN-MH
- Vehicle registration: MH 06

Pen (Marathi pronunciation: [peːɳ]) is a town in Raigad district of Indian state of Maharashtra. It is well known for world class Ganesh idols. It is the geographical and cultural center of Raigad district. Pen is also known for salt cultivation by the Aagri and Koli community.

== History ==
The name of Pen is derived from the term "पेणे" or "Pene", which means "a place to rest". Although no one is certain about the origin of Pen.

Due to its location, Pen developed as a port city (the present-day Antora port was commonly referred as "Pen Port"), with trade links as far as Egypt. It had a prosperous marketplace where the exchange of goods to and from Deccan took place.

The Kolaba District Gazettee gives Pen's history as follows

In historical times Pen was under rule of the Silaharas of Shri Sthanak (Thana) from 9th to the 12th Century and subsequently it passed under the control of the Yadavas. When Shayastakhan was sent against Sivaji, a detachment of the Moghal army had been kept at Pen but it was subsequently routed by him. Parvatibai, the wife of Sadasivrav Bhau, the hero of Panipat. In 1819 the easy communication with Bombay and with the Deccan by the Bor pass made Pen an important centre. Its chief prosperity lay in its salt beds. There was a considerable export of rice to Bombay. A number of carved stones about the town appear to belong to an unusually large temple of about the thirteenth or fourteenth century.

During the period of Shilahar kings, many temples of goddesses were built, including Jagdumba of Vashi. In the period of Chalukyas, grand temples of Shiva, like Rameshwar (रामेश्वर), Pataneshwar (पाटणेश्वर), Goteshwar (गोटेश्वर) and Vyaghreshwar (व्याघ्रेश्वर) were constructed

Vyagreshwar Temple Was built by Shri Senapati Prataprao Gujar. Ordered by Shri Chhatrapati Shivaji Maharaj in Pen Swary and later worshipped by Langi's of Pen as it is their clan deity.

Very Old Temple of Lord Shiva located in the Jungle of Wagreshwar in Mahal Mirya Donger

In Chhatrapati Shivaji Maharaj era, Shayistekhan's raid on Deccan led to major fights in Pen between Moghals and Marathas. Initially the Moghal army led by Sardar Taherkhan occupied Pen's fort of Mahalmeera and looted surrounding villages, which included desecration of the grand temple of Goteshwar. Shivaji's army fought back. They defeated Kartalabkhan in nearby Umbarkhind and officer Balakhi, near Ratangad. Mahalmeera was also taken back on 27 February 1662 and the following day, after a valiant struggle, Pen's Bastion (presently, the site of Tehsil office) was secured by Shivaji's army. In this conquest, Sardar Vaghoji Tupe fought against an equally skillful Moghal officer but at the crucial moment, Tupe dealt a decisive blow which killed the officer and ensured Maratha victory. Vaghoji was also critically injured and died soon afterwards. Shivaji Maharaj visited Pen on two occasions, on 6 August 1668 and 11 May 1674.

== Geography ==
Pen town is located at 18°40' N, 73°05' E, on the outskirts of Mumbai Metropolitan Region. It gained prominence in ancient times due to its location on trade routes to Deccan, proximity to Mumbai and Pune and its central position in the Raigad district. It lies on the bank of Bhogavati creek about 16 km from its mouth. Pen county has a total area of 199.6 sq. miles and the area of the town Pen is 6.75 sq.miles.

== Demographics ==
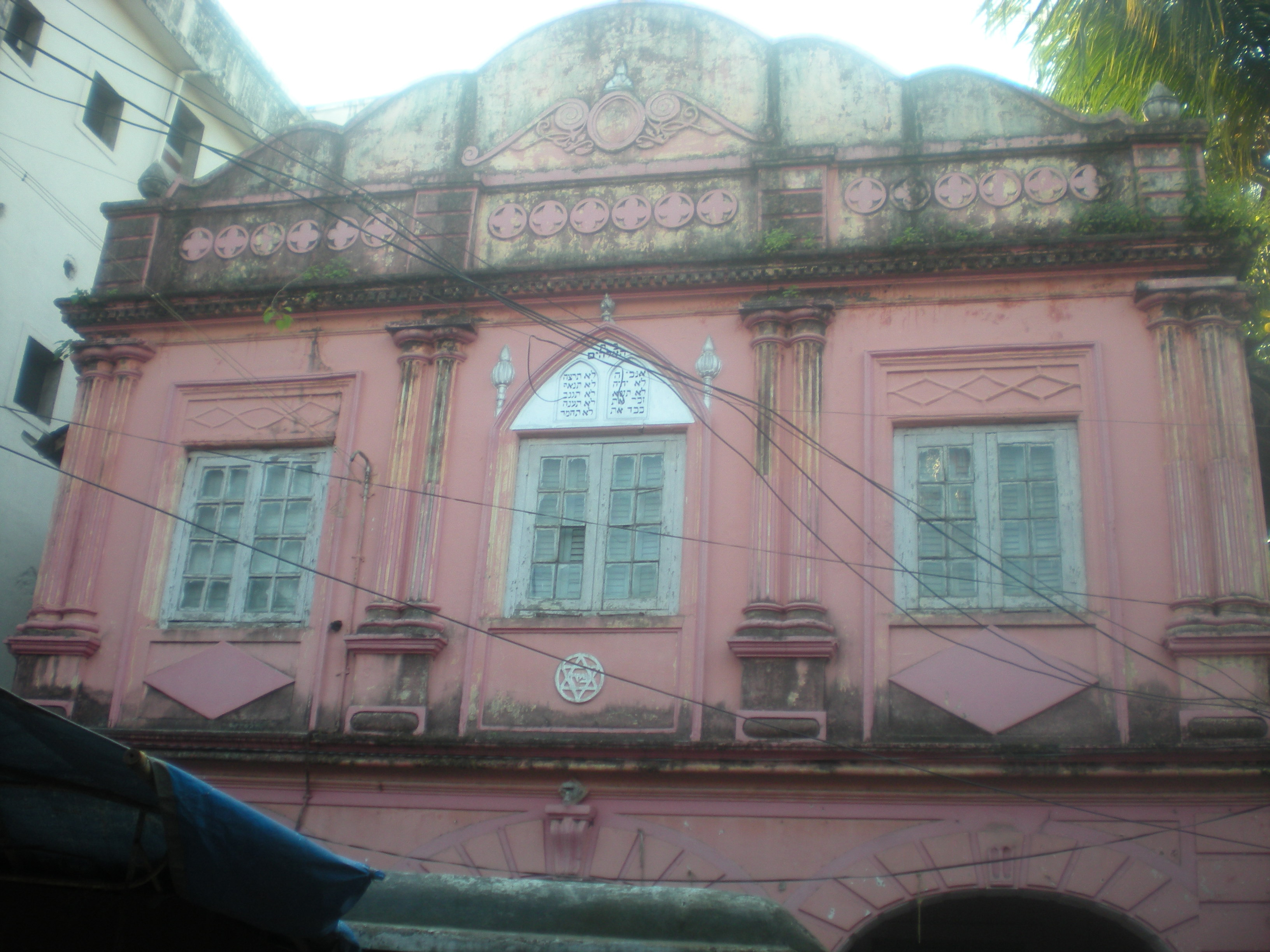
Bene Israel synagogue, the Beth-Ha-Elohim

The Pen Municipal Council has population of 37,852 of which 19,257 are males while 18,595 are females as per report released by Census India 2011. The population of children aged 0–6 is 3910 which is 10.33% of total population of Pen (M Cl). In Pen Municipal Council, the female sex ratio is 966 against state average of 929. Moreover, the child sex ratio in Pen is around 911 compared to Maharashtra state average of 894. The literacy rate of Pen city is 91.40% higher than the state average of 82.34%. In Pen, male literacy is around 93.91% while the female literacy rate is 88.82%.[chk]

Traditionally, Pen city was populated by Aagri, Brahmins and merchant's community as it was center of culture, education and trade. But now i.e. 2026 the city of Pen has become an amalgam of several castes and religions. In the olden days, Pen was recognised primarily as a Chitpavan Brahmin dominated village, but today i.e. 2026 all Pen tehsil is dominated by Aagri Community. Pen also has a large Koli community [.] . Agri community dwells in flatlands of Pen West, Hinterlands of Pen South-East are sparsely populated by tribal Katkari and Thakurs. Pen has a small Jewish community, the Bene Israel. The community has a synagogue the Beth-Ha-Elohim.

== Economy ==
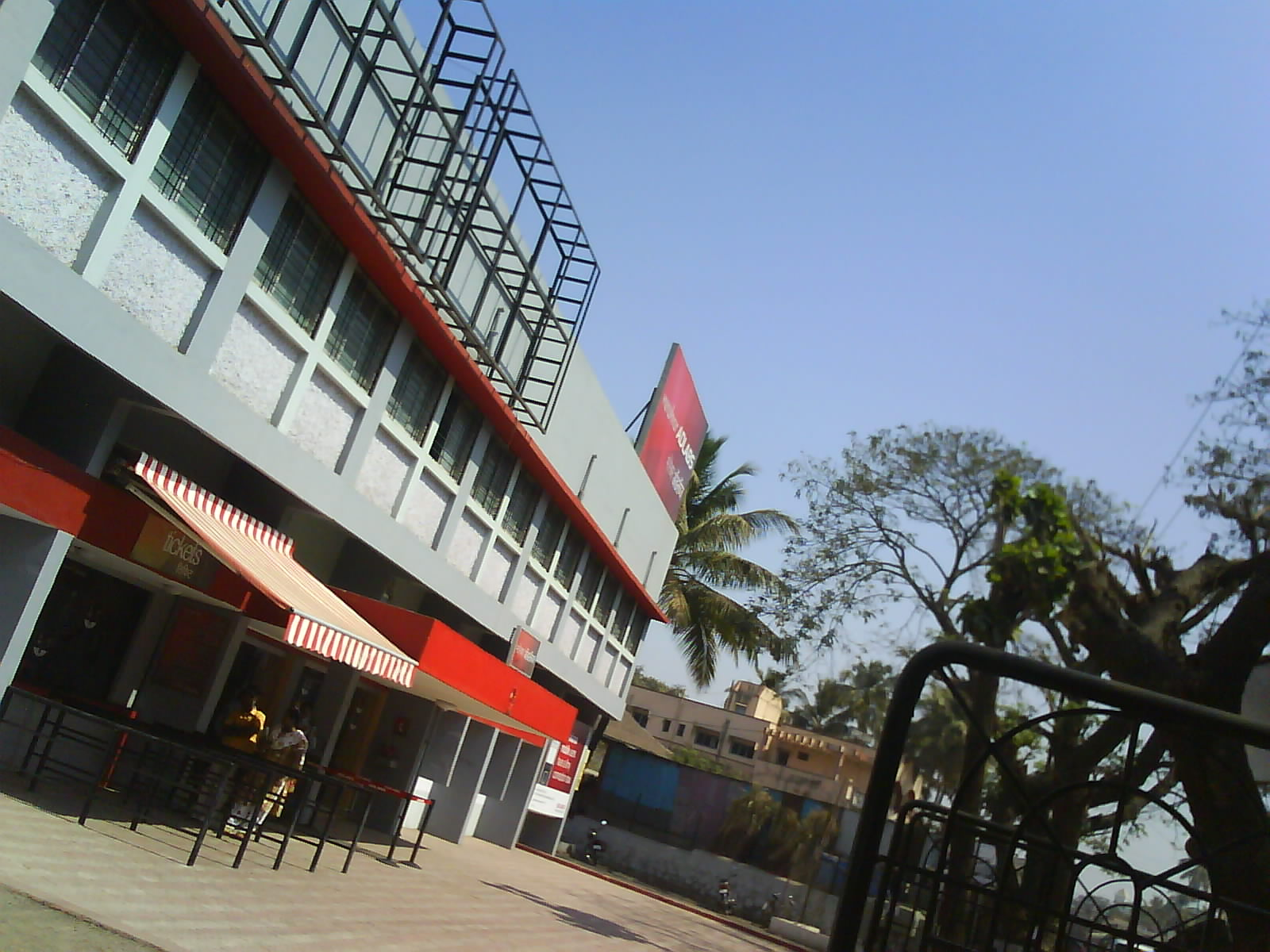
Moreshwar Adlabs (Theatre) sideview

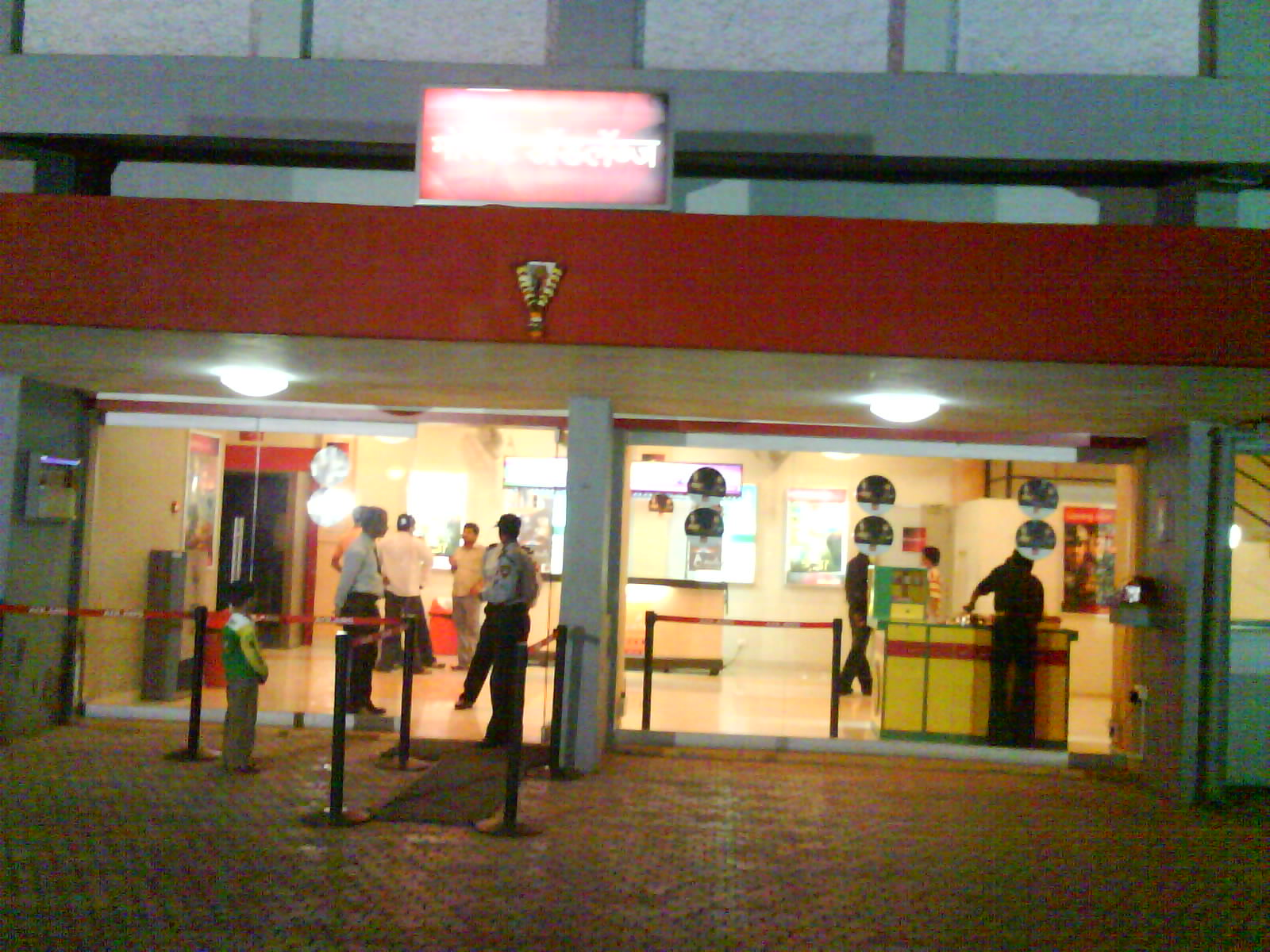
Moreshwar adlabs front gate

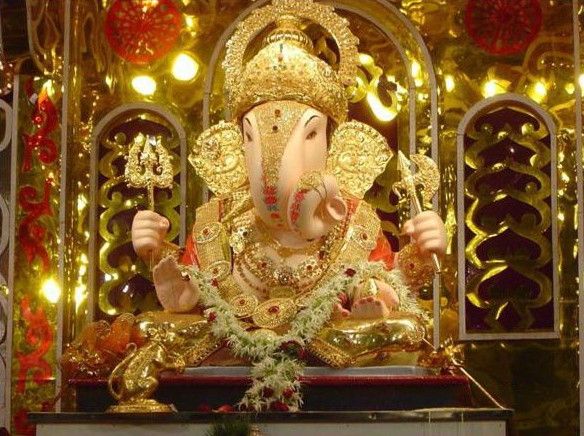
A clay Ganesha murti, worshipped during Ganesh Chaturthi festival.

People in the city are employed in various sectors such as trade/business, education, banking, industries, services, papad making (women's co-operatives) and idol making. Most villagers are dependent for livelihood on Paddy farming in monsoon. Various vegetables are also grown as by-products, especially in eastern part of the county.

The industrial belt in the western part of the county is causing a major problem of pollution in surrounding rural areas, creating health problems and reducing crop yields. Reliance Industries was promoting a Maha Mumbai Special Economic Zone, located around the town. A study conducted by Citizen's Research Collective on SEZ has called the Maha Mumbai Special Economic Zone a Special Exploitation Zone Land owners resisted the purchase of their land for the purpose and following a historic referendum on the issue, SEZ was cancelled. Land prices are soaring and economy is growing rapidly but there are some serious concerns about uneven and unjust development.

Pen is known for its Ganesh idols which are used widely for the "Ganesh Festival". Many of Ganesh Idols in Mumbai are brought from Pen. There are multiple lanes [termed as "Ali"] which consist only of such idol-making craftsmen. Going through these lanes one can see the whole process of developing Ganesh idols. Ganesh idols are now even exported to the Marathi population in the US.

Women in Pen are occupied in the domestic business of preparing " पोहे" or "Pohe" (flattened rice) and papad. Significance of Papad business is that this business is women dominated business. number of women workers are significantly high. There are hardly any male worker working in the Papad business. Moreover, owner of these papad business are women. There has been betterment in this business in past few years and they have introduced varieties of Papads. Today, there are approximately 72 to 75 types of papad that they manufacture. types of papad includes Tikali papad, Miragunda papad, Poha Papad, Rice Papad, Nachani Papad Fenugreek Papad etc. This business is on such high peak that they distribute papad not only in India but they export papads out of India.

Due to unique geological features of the western part of Pen County (Vashi Subdivision), Pen has been for centuries hub of salt making industry dominated by Aagri koli community while Brahmin people are also involved. .

As of 2026, As announced by presiding CM Devendra Fadnavis, The Raigad-Pen Growth Centre is emerging as the flagship "Third Mumbai" project, a ₹8.73 lakh crore (approx. $100 Billion) smart city initiative designed by CIDCO to decongest Mumbai and Navi Mumbai. Covering 124 villages in Pen, Panvel, and Uran, it is being developed as a global business hub with advanced connectivity, featuring residential, commercial, and high-tech industrial zones.

== Education ==
From historic times, Pen has been a center of education and culture in the konkan region. In fact, Lokmanya Tilak used to call it "कोकणचे पुणे"(Pune of Konkan) due to progressive mindset of Penkars and their love of knowledge. There were at least two school of Vedas(वेदशाळा) in Datar Ali area of Pen city, one of them in Sahasrabuddhe family. Pundits from all over Maharashtra used to come to Pen to make copies of rare ancient books(पोथी). Sages of Pen especially Bhave, were so superior intellectually, that they defeated sages who accompanied Shankarachrya of Kashi, in debates on Religious studies during his 1883 visit.

English language instructions came to Pen in the late 19th century in the form of primary English classes started by Christian missionaries. This school moved to Alibag with the shifting of the district headquarters there. The Pen Municipal council started five classes, and subsequently Vinayak Narayan Manohar started the remaining two classes, naming them Pen Candidate Classes.The Jewish community who lived in the Pen village adopted the last name of them as "पेणकर" or "Penkar" and it is still being continued wherever the descendants of their people settle, even in USA, Canada, and Israel. Plague caused this school to be closed. This English-Marathi school was later revived in the first decade of the 20th century. Balkrishna Shankar Karandikar started an industrial training school around this time; the Kokan Vidyalaya, which was later closed as a result of his arrest for involvement in Jackson's shooting at Nasik in 1909. On 10 April 1910 the Pen Education society was formed, Pen Private High School was started, in Shankar Khanderao Phanse's bungalow (now the Maternity Hospital), from where it shifted in October 1912, to its present premises at the foot of Peer Dongri. Pen has a grand public library: The Mahatma Gandhi Vachanalay or "महात्मा गांधी वाचनालय".

== People born in Pen ==
- Vasudeo Sitaram Bendrey (born 1986), historian, author, editor, translator and publisher
- Vinoba Bhave (1895–1982), philosopher and advocate of nonviolence and human rights
- Rambhau Mandlik (1881–1958), freedom fighter and politician
