= Gira (disambiguation) =

Gira, or kvass, is a fermented low-alcoholic beverage.

Gira may also refer to:

- Gira, Balotra, or Gida, a tehsil in Balotra District, Rajasthan, India
- Gira (bicycle rental), a bike rental scheme in Lisbon, Portugal
- Gira (grape), another name for the Italian wine grape Girò
- Gira language, Papua New Guinea
- Gira River, India
- Gira Sarabhai (1923–2021), Indian architect and designer
- Gira (surname)
- Pomba Gira, a deity of Umbanda and Quimbanda religions in Brazil

== See also ==
- Jira (disambiguation)
