= Vadhyawan State =

Princely state

- Princely State of British India
- 1948
- Location of Vadhyawan in the Dang region
- Area
  - 1931: 12.691 km^{2} (4.900 sq mi)
- Population
  - 1931: 147
Succeeded by
India

Vadhyawan State was a minor princely state during the British Raj in what is today Gujarat State India. It was initially administered by the Surat Agency and then by the Western India States Agency. The state had a population of 147 and an area of 4.9 sq miles.

It was more specifically classified as one of the 14 minor princely states of the Dangs, in the Dang district, India.

== History ==
The area of Khandesh became a British possession in 1818 following the defeat of Peshwa Baji Rao II during the Third Anglo-Maratha War. The neighbouring Dang principalities were seen as separate states and conducted routine raids into the Khandesh territories. In 1825 the Gaekwar of Baroda sent a force of 10 000 men to subdue the Dangs but were defeated, the Dang states omly subjugated in 1839. In 1842 parts of the Dang teak forests, surrounding 446 villages, were leased by the Government in Bombay, the lease extended in perpetuity and to the whole territory in 1862. Some time after 1842 the tribute demanded of the Dang states by the Desmukh of Mulher lead to heavy disturbances, which resulted in the British Government deducting the Desmukh's tribute from the sum paid to the Dang chiefs for leasing their forests.

In 1880 the state had a yearly revenue of ca£. 24 (240 Rupees)

== Rulers ==
The Rulers had the title of Naik The Dang Chiefs held the power to settle criminal and civil disputes, including being able to issue fines, have witches sentenced to be burnt alive and other capital offenders being killed by being shot by arrows.

- Lakshman Ráma fl. 1880
- Naik Mohanya walad Phulaingh (b. 1849) fl. 1893
- Naik Gangaram Ankush (b. 1869), 7 April 1903 - fl. 1939
