= Gadvi State =

Princely state

- Princely State of British India
- 1948
- Location of Gadvi in the Dang region
- Area
  - 1931: 442.42 km^{2} (170.82 sq mi)
- Population
  - 1931: 7 767
Succeeded by
India

Gadvi State (or Ghárvi) was a minor princely state during the British Raj in what is today Gujarat State India. It was initially administered by the Surat Agency and then by the Western India States Agency. The state had a population of 7 767 and an area of 170.82 miles.

It was more specifically classified as one of the 14 minor princely states of the Dangs, in the Dang district, India.

== History ==
The area of Khandesh became a British possession in 1818 following the defeat of Peshwa Baji Rao II during the Third Anglo-Maratha War. The neighbouring Dang principalities were seen as separate states and conducted routine raids into the Khandesh territories. In 1825 the Gaekwar of Baroda sent a force of 10,000 men to subdue the Dangs but were defeated, the Dang states only subjugated in 1839. During the campaign, the Rajas of Vasurna, Chinchli Gaded and Gadvi had looted villages in Peint and Baglan.

In 1842 parts of the Dang teak forests, surrounding 446 villages, were leased by the Government in Bombay, the lease extended in perpetuity and to the whole territory in 1862. Some time after 1842 the tribute demanded of the Dang states by the Desmukh of Mulher lead to heavy disturbances, which resulted in the British Government deducting the Desmukh's tribute from the sum paid to the Dang chiefs for leasing their forests.

After the death of Raja Joravár without heirs, two of his brothers, including Davising, contested the succession, and were persuaded to relinquish their claims in the benefit of their uncle Udesing. Udesing was succeeded by his son Keralsing.

Davising had meanwhile wounded two people in a private quarel and was held in Thana and Surat prisons, before being placed in a lunatic asylum at Colába in Bombay. He escaped from Bombay, killed Keralsing and plundered the territories of several other Dang Chiefs, before surrendering himself to the Political Agent at Surat.

Keralsing was succeeded by his son Fatesing, who was noted to be oppressive to his people, being succeeded by his son Nathu on his death in 1879.

In 1880 the state had a yearly revenue of ca£. 500 (5000 Rupees)

== Rulers ==
The Rulers had the title of Raja The Dang Chiefs held the power to settle criminal and civil disputes, including being able to issue fines, have witches sentenced to be burnt alive and other capital offenders being killed by being shot by arrows.

- Silpat
- Jorávar, son of Silpat
- Udesing
- Keralsing
- Fatesing -1877
- Nathu 1877-fl. 1880
- Raja Umar Singh walad Devrao (b. 1868) 1886-fl. 1893
- Raja Samajsingh Umarsingh (b. January 25, 1890) March 30, 1896-fl. 1935
- Raja Umarsinh Kirajsinh (b. 1934) November 24, 1938-fl. 1940
