= Bilbari State =

Princely state

- Princely State of British India
- 1948
- Location of Bilbari in the Dang region
- Area
  - 1931: 4.27 km^{2} (1.65 sq mi)
- Population
  - 1931: 27
Succeeded by
India

Bilbari State (or Dhude or Dudhe) was a minor princely state during the British Raj in what is today Gujarat State India. It was initially administered by the Surat Agency and then by the Western India States Agency, and with a population of 27 and an area of 1.65 sq miles it was potentially the smallest Princely State in India. possibly only beaten by Vijanones. It was more specifically classified as one of the 14 minor princely states of the Dangs, in the Dang district, India.

Whenever Bilbari was referenced in print, it was almost always to mention its small area and minuscule population. So for example did the Marion Star (1948-02-09) lament its passing on the abolition of the Indian Princely States in 1948:

The world never heard of Bilbari and there were few to mark its passing. Its government must have operated on the Jeffersonian precept that the government is best which governs least.

== History ==
The area of Khandesh became a British possession in 1818 following the defeat of Peshwa Baji Rao II during the Third Anglo-Maratha War. The neieghbouring Dang principalities were seen as separate states and conducted routine raids into the Khandesh territories. In 1825 the Gaekwar of Baroda sent a force of 10 000 men to subdue the Dangs but were defeated, the Dang states only subjugated in 1839. In 1842 parts of the Dang teak forests, surrounding 446 villages, were leased by the Government in Bombay, the lease extended in perpetuity and to the whole territory in 1862. Some time after 1842 the tribute demanded of the Dang states by the Desmukh of Mulher lead to heavy disturbances, which resulted in the British Government deducting the Desmukh's tribute from the sum paid to the Dang chiefs for leasing their forests.

In 1880 the state had a yearly revenue of ca. 9 £ (90 Rupees).

== Rulers ==
The Rulers of Bilbari held the title of Powar, and their caste was registered as Animist. The Dang Chiefs held the power to settle criminal and civil disputes, including being able to issue fines, have witches sentenced to be burnt alive and other capital offenders being killed by being shot by arrows.

- Mhosha walad Vaghu (b. ca. 1860) fl. 1893
- Bhavji walad Mahasia Konkna (b. 1891) 1903-at least January 1934
- Maharu Bhavjia Konkna (b. 1924) 12th October 1934-fl. 1940
