= Madhubhai Jeliyabhai Bhoye =

Indian politician

Madhubhai Jeliyabhai Bhoye is an Indian politician from Gujarat. He is a member of the Indian National Congress Party.

In 2002, he was elected to the Gujarat Legislative Assembly from the Dangs-Bansda constituency in Dang district.
