= Rupgadh Fort =

Coordinates: 20.9604°N 73.5951°E

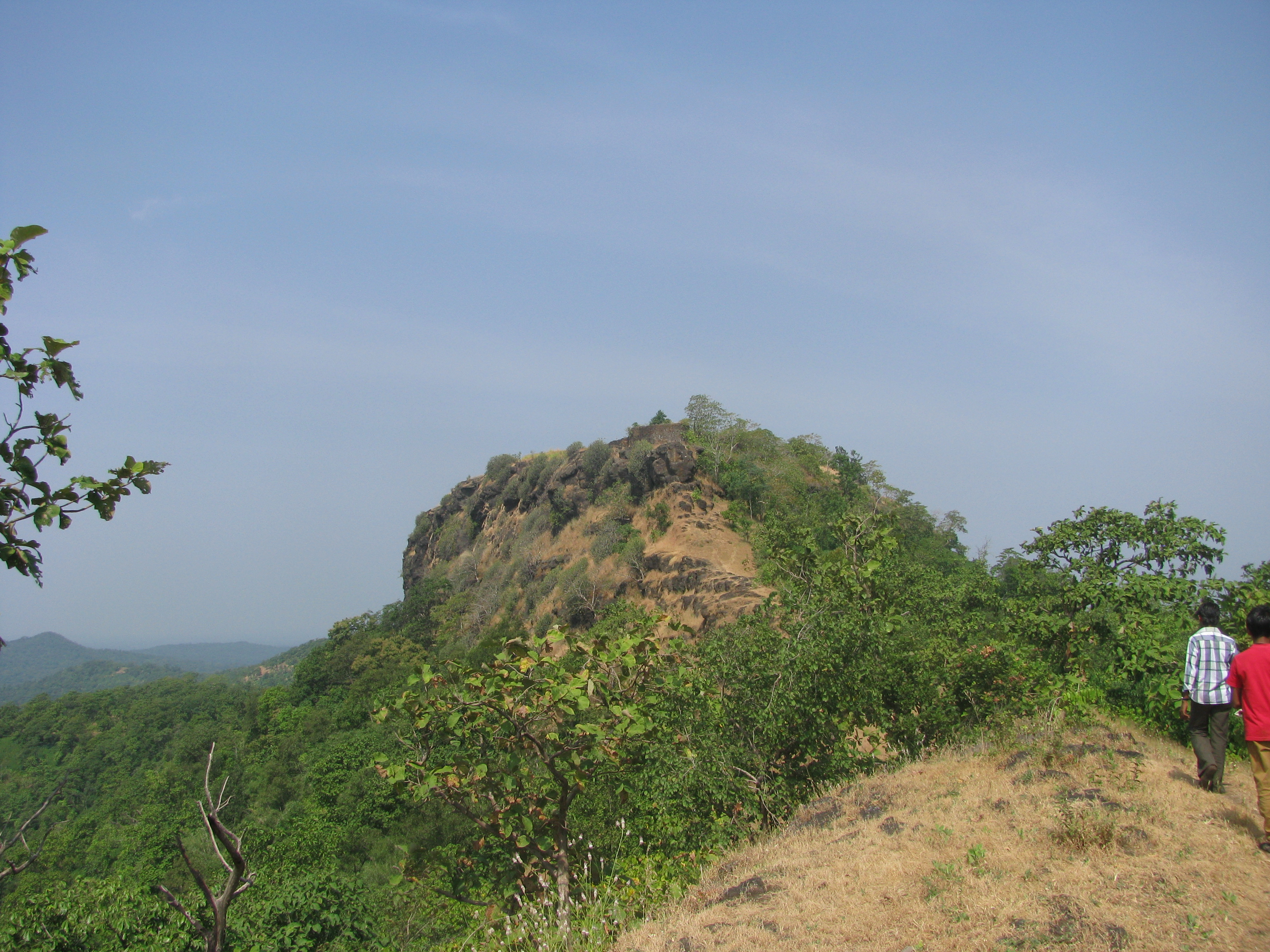
Rupgadh Fort from South side.

Rupgadh Fort or Roopgadh Fort is a fort located in Dang district of Gujarat, India. Rupgarh Fort was originally the fort of the Bhil kings which was later taken over by the Gaekwads. This fort is an example of 17th-century Dangi mountain architecture.

== History ==
Pilaji Rao Gaikwad of Gaikwad dynasty built this fort in 1721 and made Songadh the capital of his state. His son Damaji Rao shifted the capital to Vadodara later.

== Fort ==
Fort has water storage facilities and a place to store ammunition and food. This fort is 1,670 feet above sea level, a climb of 780 feet from the Bhangrapani forest checkpost.

There is water spring on the north direction of fort and a small temple of Hanuman beside it. A few cannons lie near this temple. One can reach the fort using two routes. A vehicle can reach the fort from Kalibel village via Popatbari village in an hour. From the north side, Vadirupgadh village of Songadh can be used to reach the fort.

== Gallery ==
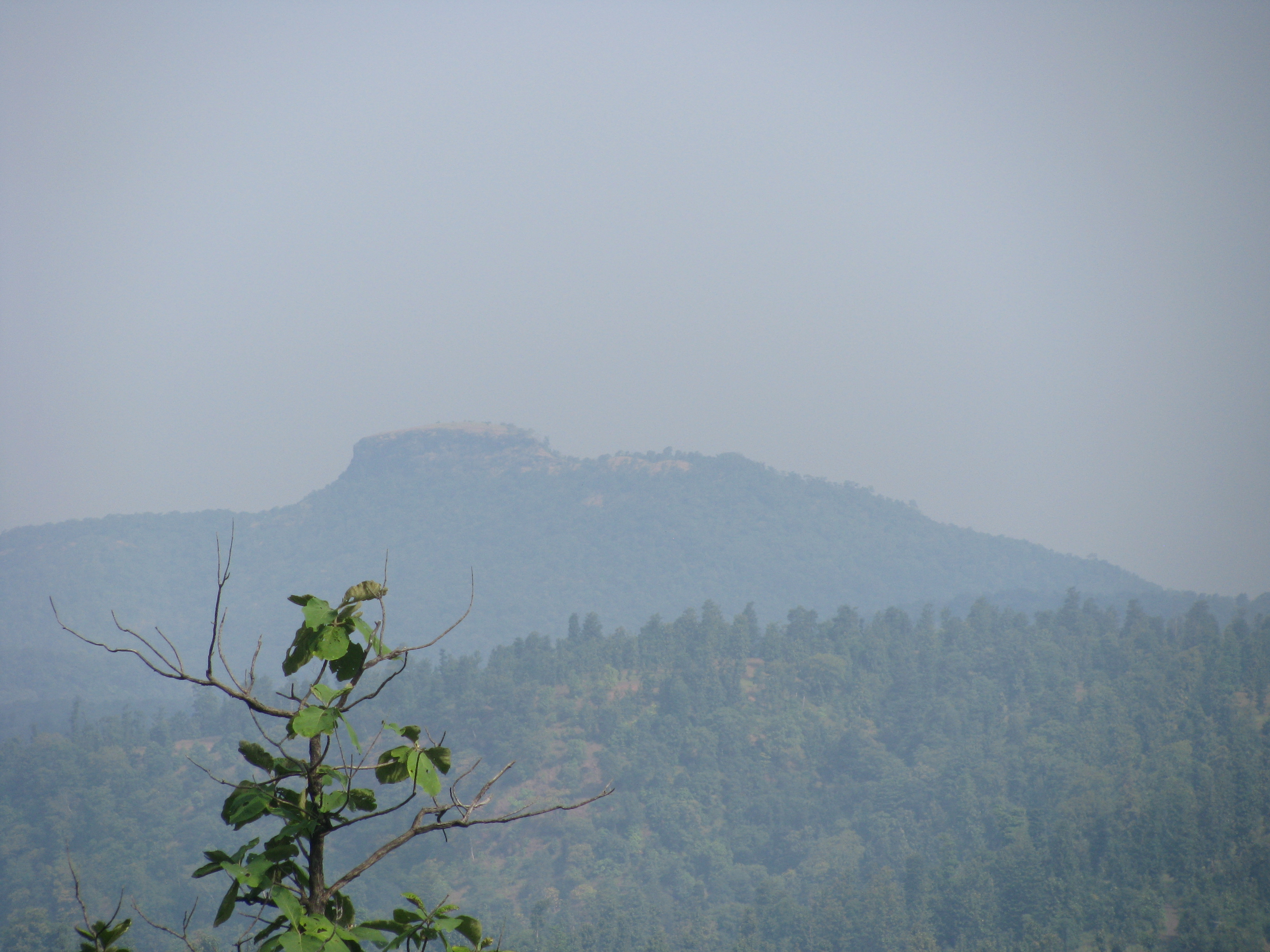
Fort from south

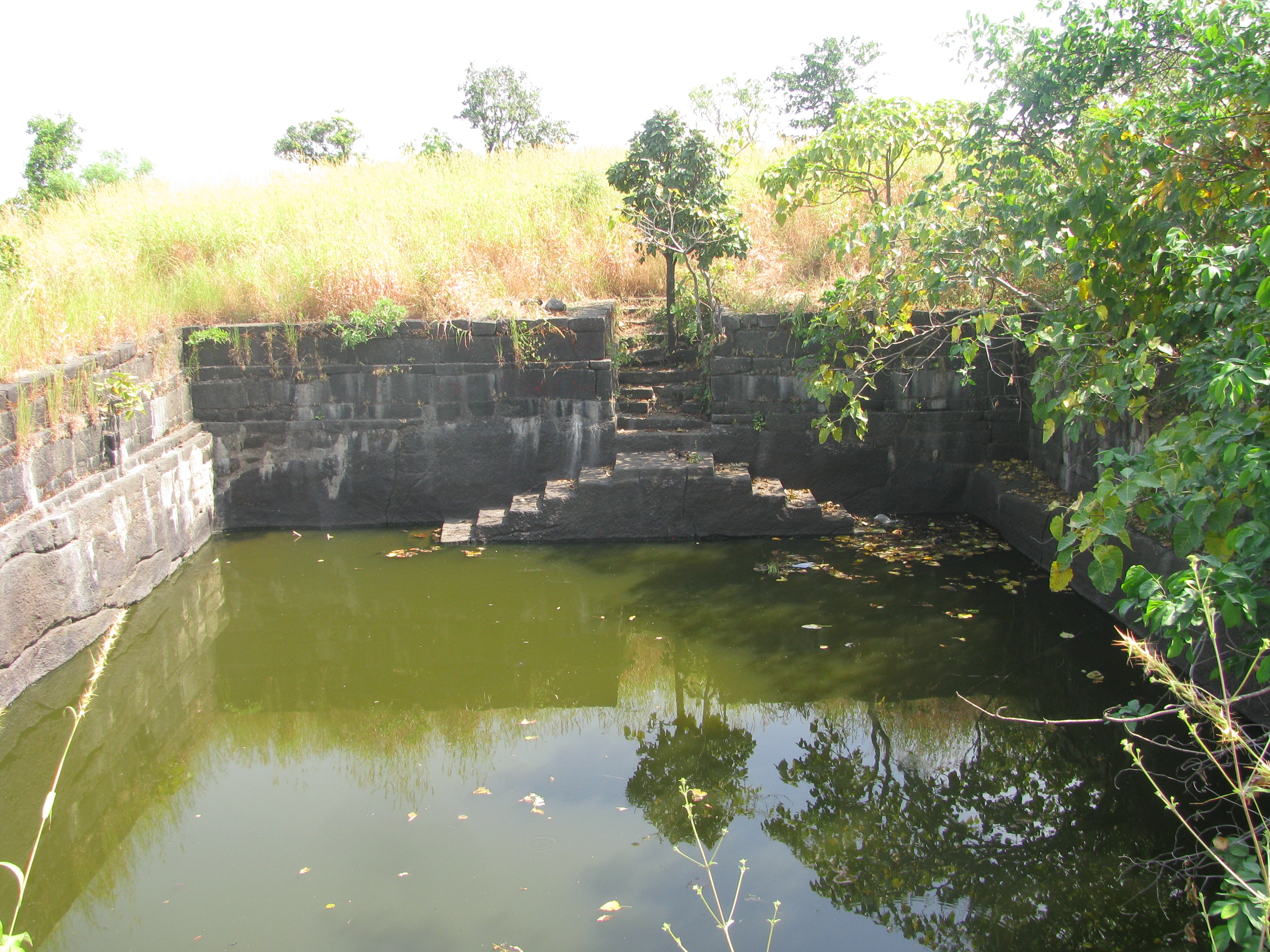
Water tank

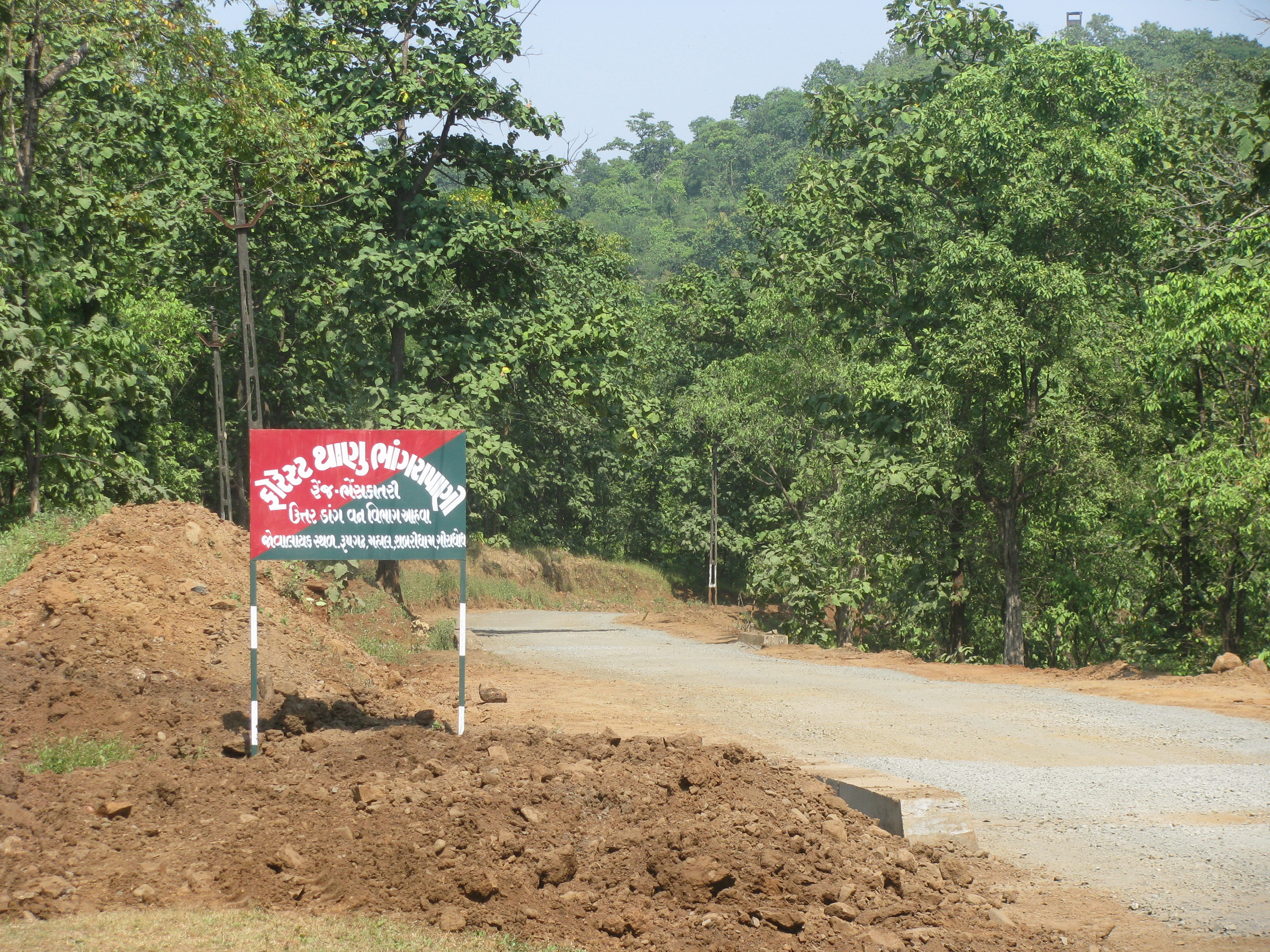
Bhangrapani checkpost

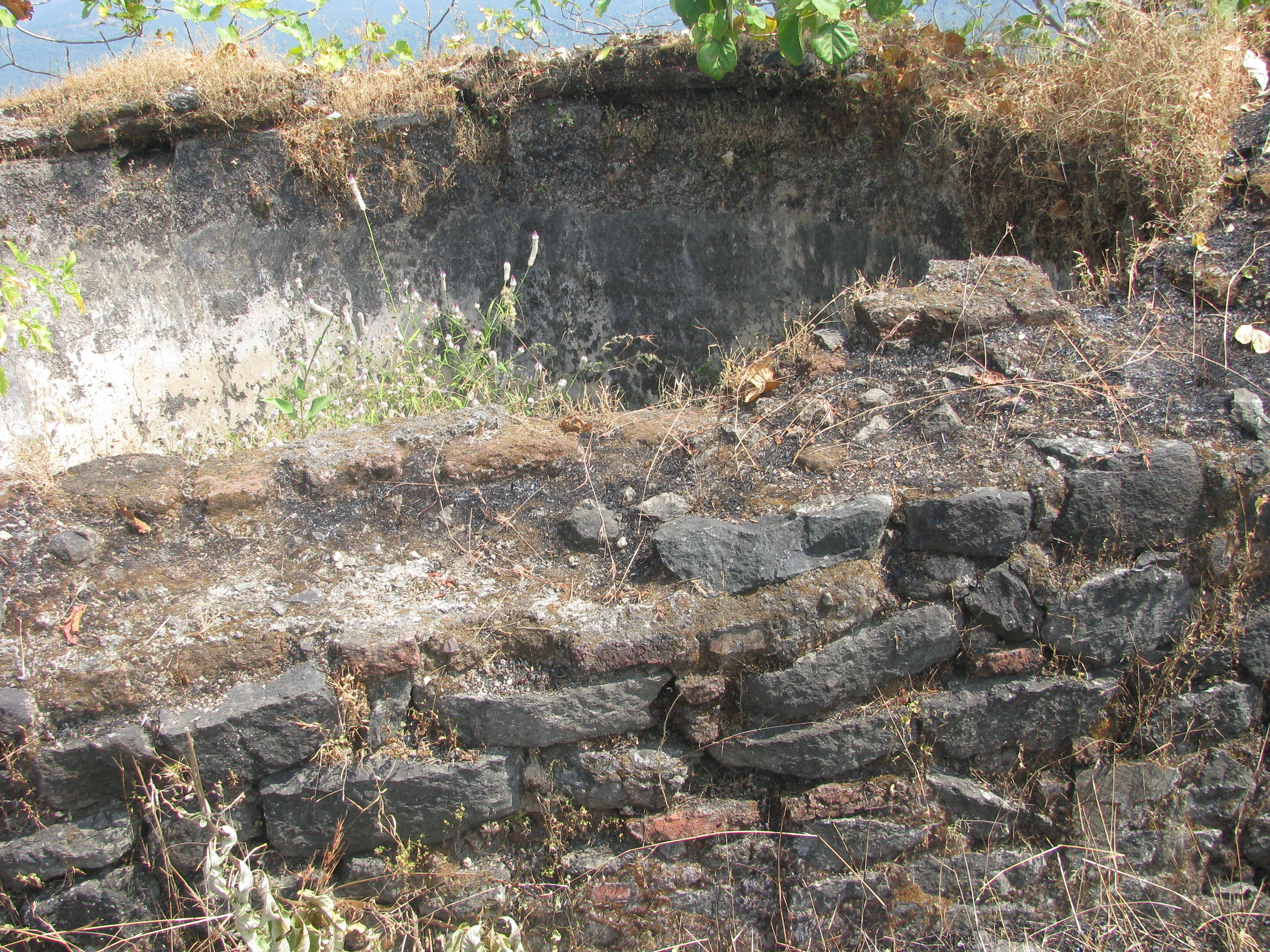
Ruins of the fort

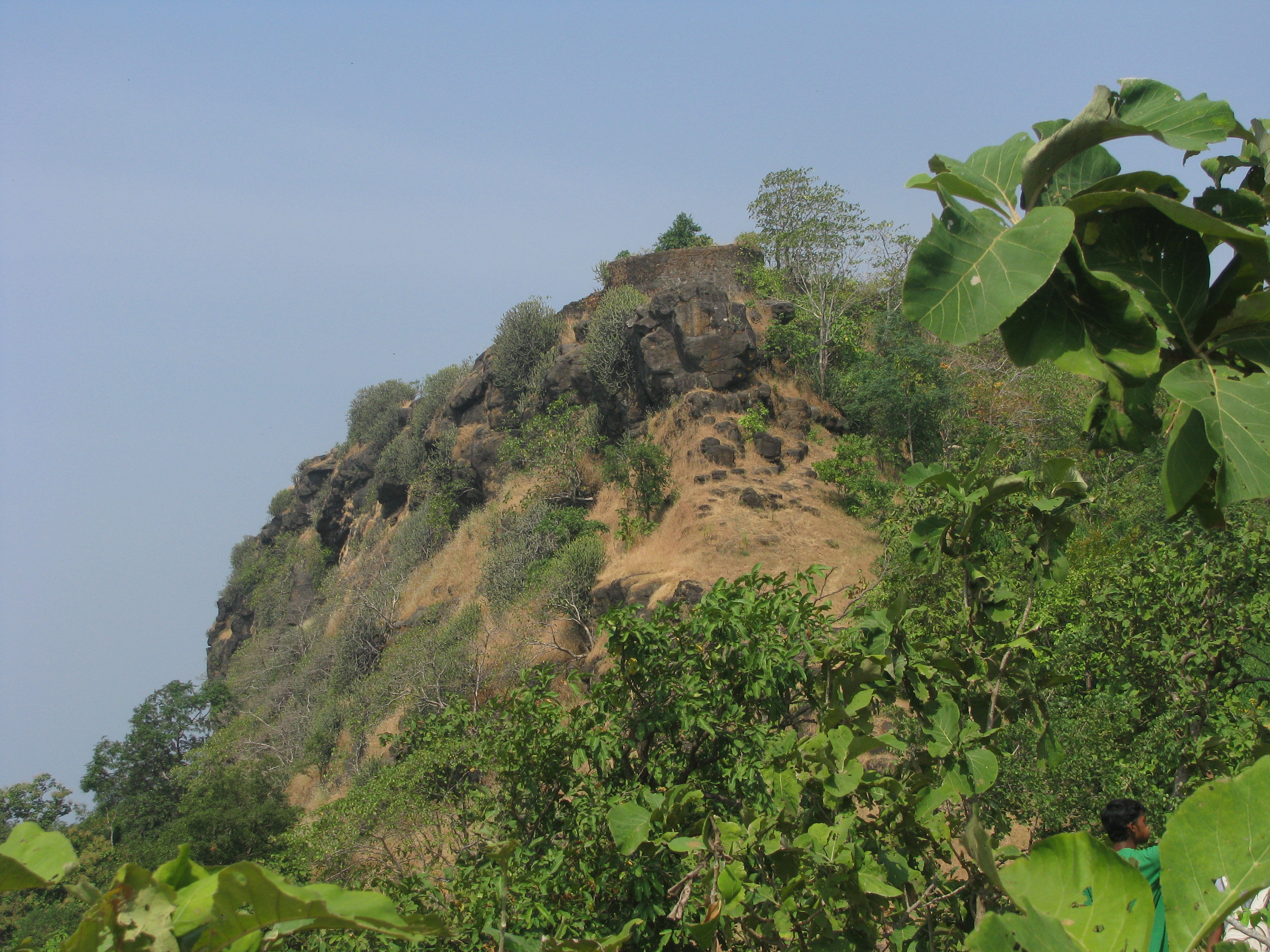
Fort from north
