= Dang, Uttar Pradesh =

Coordinates: 28.669°N 79.680°E

Dang is a village in Amariya Block of Pilibhit district in Uttar Pradesh, India. Dang is a leading rice manufacturer in Pilibhit.

== See also ==
- Dang District, Gujarat
