= Surat Agency =

Agency of British India in Bombay Presidency

Coordinates: 21.18°N 72.83°E

Surat Agency सूरत સુરત سورت
- Agency of British India
- 1880–1933
- Flag

- Surat Agency within Gujarat
- Area
  - 1901: 5,076 km^{2} (1,960 sq mi)
- Population
  - 1901: 179,975
- History
  - Abolition of the Khandesh Agency: 1880
  - Formation of the Baroda and Gujarat States Agency: 1933
Preceded by	Succeeded by
Khandesh	Baroda and Gujarat States Agency

Surat Agency with all princely states with labels British India 1880-1933

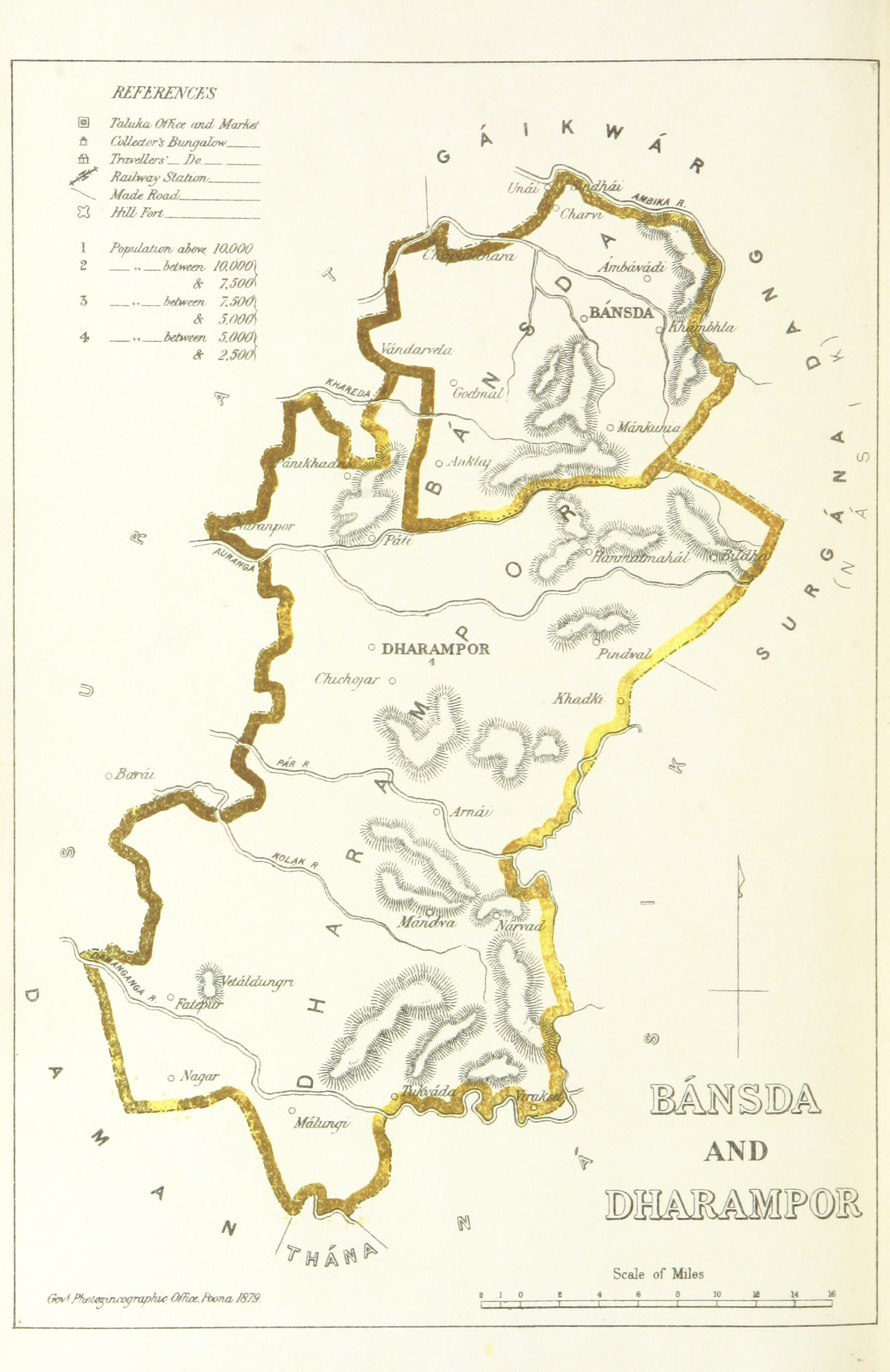
Bansda and Dharampur, 1896

The Surat Agency was one of the agencies of British India in the Bombay Presidency.

== History ==
This agency was formed in the 19th century as the Khandesh Agency, after the region of Khandesh, becoming the Surat Agency in 1880. Around 1900, the Dangs were incorporated, and in 1933, it was abolished and became part of the Baroda and Gujarat States Agency.

In 1944, towards the end of the British Raj, the Baroda and Gujarat States Agency was ultimately merged with the Western India States Agency to form the larger Baroda, Western India and Gujarat States Agency.

The headquarters of the Surat Agency were at Surat, where the Political Agent who reported to the Political Department office in Bombay, used to reside.

== States ==
The agency included three 9-gun salute princely states and the Dangs.

=== Salute States ===
- Sachin
- Bansda
- Dharampur

=== The Dangs ===
The Dangs were a group of small states in what is now the Dang district of Gujarat State.

State	Population	Revenue (1881, Rs.)	Ruler's title. Notes
Pimpri State	3,600	3106	388 km^{2}
Vadhyawan State	253	147	approx. 12 km^{2}. Not to be confused with Wadhwan State, whose capital was Wadhwan.
Dang Ketak Kadupada	218	155	
Amala State	5,300	2885; 1891: 5300	Raja. 307 km^{2}
Chinchli Gaded State	1,670; 1891: approx. 1,400	601	approx. 70 km^{2}
Pimpladevi State	134	120	approx. 10 km^{2}
Palasvihir State	223	230	approx. 5 km^{2}
Avchar State	approx. 500	201	< 21 km^{2}
Derbhavti State	4,891; 1891: approx. 5,000	3649	Raja. 196 km^{2}
Gadvi State (= Gadhi)	6,309	5125	Raja.
Shivbara State	346	422	approx. 12 km^{2}
Kirli State (= Kirali)	167	512	31 km^{2}
Vasurna State	6,177	2275	
Bilbari State	27	85	< 5 km^{2}
Jhari Gharkhadi State	507		21.16 km^{2}
Dang Surgana	14,000	11,469	
Machhali	1,100	4745	35

== See also ==
- Western India States Agency
