= Kathiawar Agency =

Agency of the British Raj

Coordinates: 22°18′N 70°48′E

- Agency of princely states in the British Raj
- 1819–1924
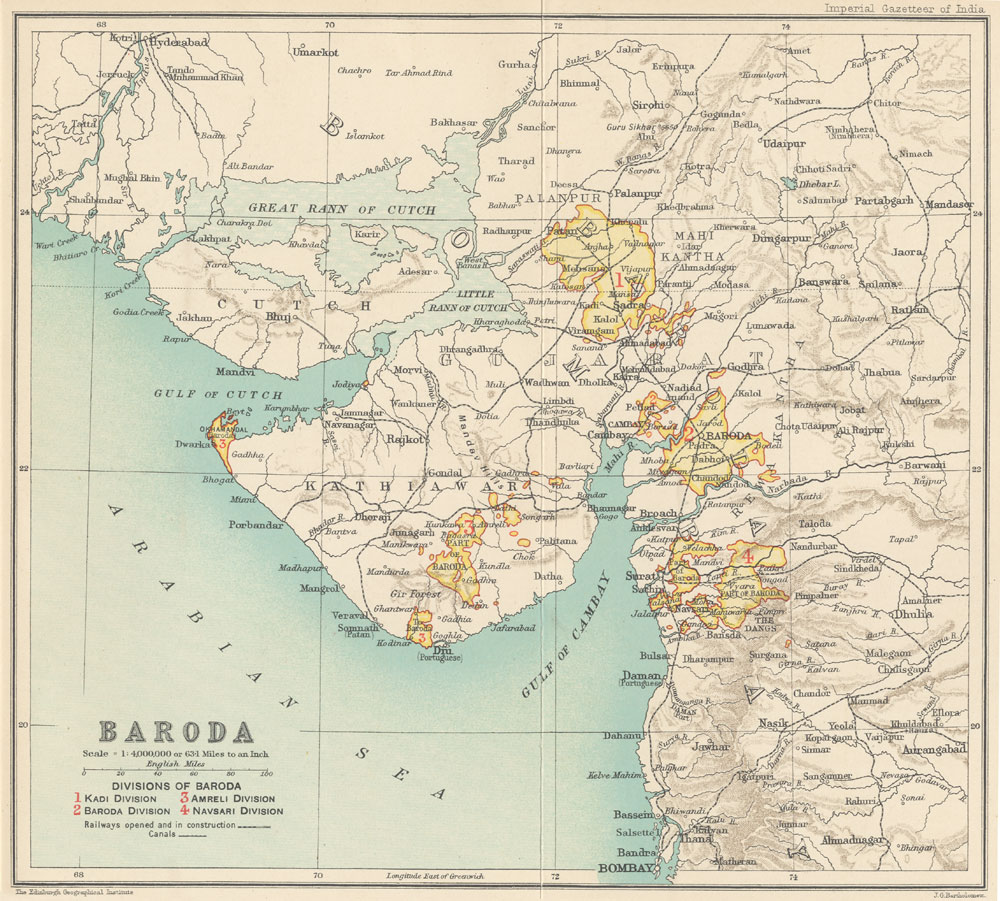
- Map of the Kathiawar Agency area
- Area
  - 1901: 54,084 km^{2} (20,882 sq mi)
- Population
  - 1901: 2,329,196
- History
  - Established: 1819
  - Formation of the Western India States Agency: 1924
Preceded by	Succeeded by
Maratha Confederacy	Western India States Agency

The Kathiawar Agency, on the Kathiawar peninsula in the western part of the British Raj was a political unit of some 200 small princely states under the suzerainty of the Bombay Presidency.

The agency's headquarters were at Rajkot, the town where the Political Agent used to reside. He reported to the Political Department office at Bombay, Bombay Presidency.

== History ==
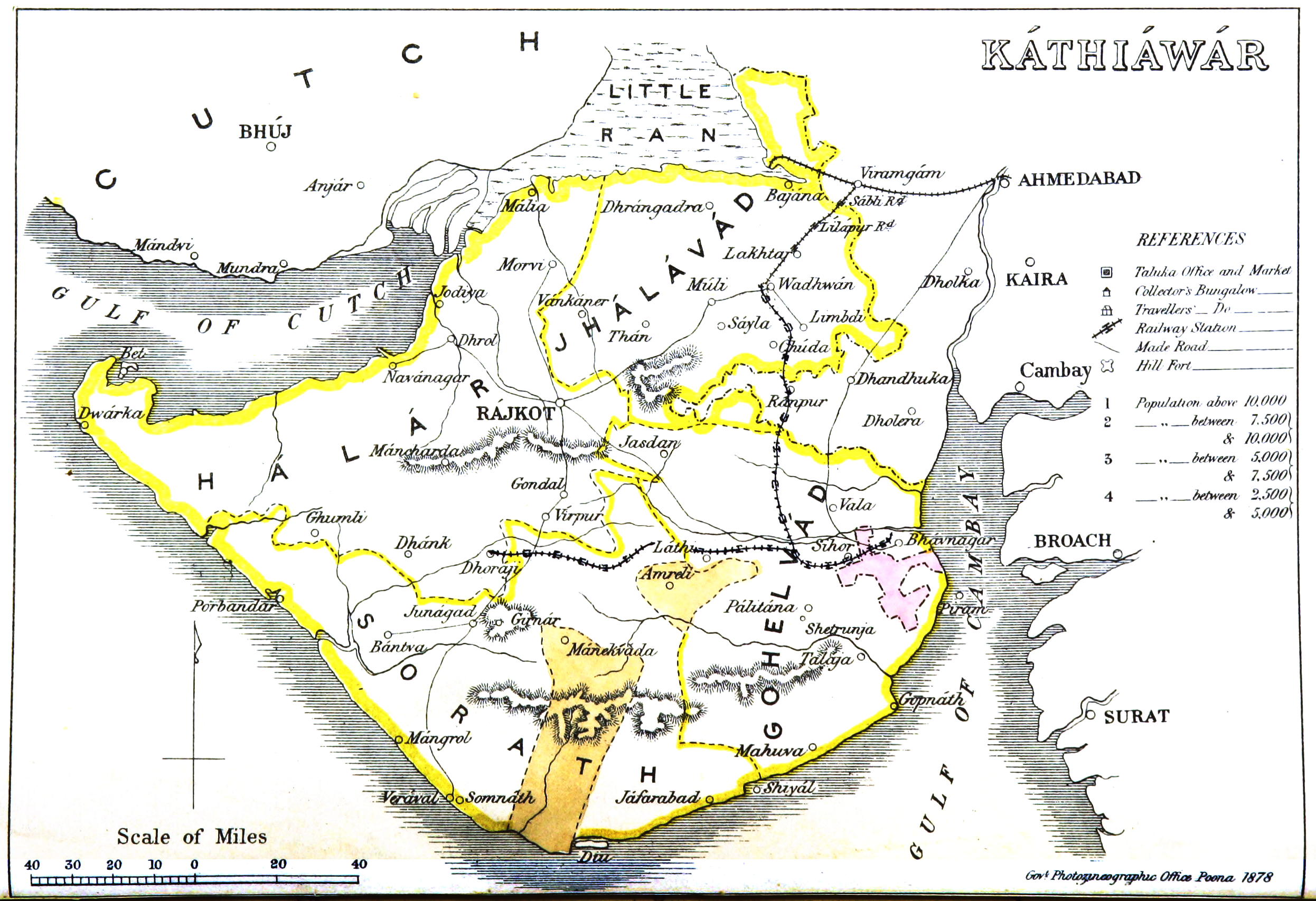
Kathiawar region in 1878

The agency was formed in 1822, after the princely states in the area became British protectorates.

The region was severely affected by the famine of 1899–1900. Between 1891 and 1901, the population of the states covered by the Agency decreased by 15 per cent, largely due to the results of the famine.

On 10 October 1924, the agency was abolished and merged into the Western India States Agency, which had three subdivisions:

- Eastern Kathiawar Agency (from 1926 onwards)
- Western Kathiawar Agency (from 1926 onwards)
- Sabar Kantha Agency (merged with Eastern Kathiawar Agency on 1 September 1943) including Banas Kantha Agency (former Palanpur Agency)

== Princely states ==
There were altogether 193 states of varying size and importance, of which fourteen exercised independent jurisdiction, while the rest were to varying degrees under British administration. The eight states of the first class were Bhavnagar State, Dhrangadhra State, Gondal State, Jafarabad State, Junagadh State, Sardargarh Bantva state, Morvi State, Nawanagar State, and Porbandar State. The agency covered an area of 20,882 square miles (54,080 km^{2}), and in 1901 the population was 2,329,196. The headquarters of the political agent (who oversaw the affairs of the princely states on behalf of the Governor-General) was at Rajkot, in the centre of the peninsula; this was also the site of the Rajkumar College, Rajkot, where many of the sons of the rulers were educated. There was a similar school for girasias, or chiefs of lower rank, at Gondal.

The estimated gross revenue of the several states was 1,278,000 rupees in 1911; total tribute (payable to the British, the Gaekwar of Baroda and the nawab of Junagadh), was 70,000 rupees. An excellent system of metre-gauge railways was built at the cost of the leading states. Maritime trade was also very active, the chief ports being Porbandar, Mangrol and Veraval. In 1903–1904 the total seaborne exports were valued at 1,300,000 rupees, and the imports at 1,120,000.

== See also ==
- Western India States Agency

== External links and Sources ==
- Imperial Gazetteer - Kathiawar
