= Cutch Agency =

Political agency of British India

Coordinates: 23°54′N 70°22′E

- Agency of British India
- 1819–1924
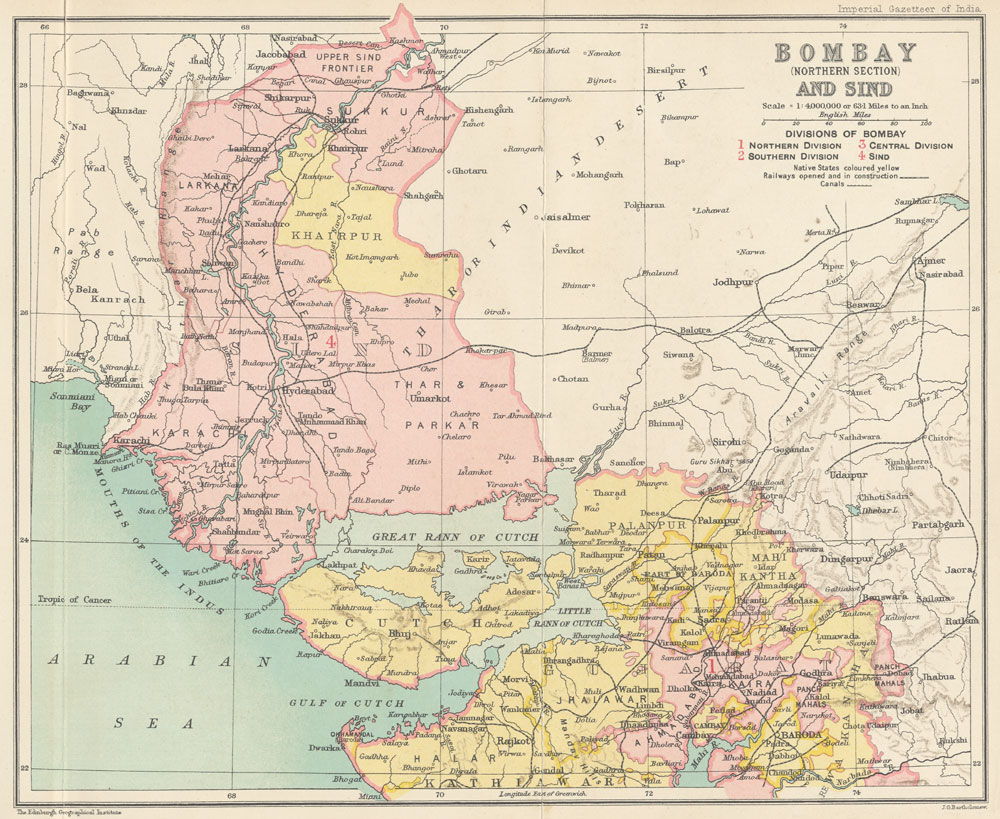
- Map of the Cutch Agency area
- Area
  - 1901: 19,725 km^{2} (7,616 sq mi)
- Population
  - 1901: 488,022
- History
  - Established: 1819
  - Formation of the Western India States Agency: 1924
Succeeded by
Western India States Agency

The Cutch Agency was one of the agencies of British India. The appointed Political Agent looked after only one territory, that of the princely state of Cutch, which had a surface of 19,725 square kilometres (7,616 sq mi), not including the Rann of Kutch.

The agency's headquarters were at Bhuj, where the Political Agent used to reside. He reported to the Political Department office at Bombay, Bombay Presidency.

== History ==
The agency was formed in 1819 when Cutch State became a British protectorate.

Captain James MacMurdo was first appointed Political Agent, as Collector and Resident of Cutch. He worked from his office at Anjar while the capital of Cutch State was located away at Bhuj.

The progressive prosperity of Cutch was devastated by the famine of 1899-1900, which was felt everywhere with extreme severity; between 1891 and 1901 the population of the state of Cutch decreased from 558,415 inhabitants in 1891 to 488,022 in 1901, owing to the famine.

On 10 October 1924 the Cutch Agency was abolished and merged into the Western India States Agency.

== See also ==
- History of Tharparkar
