= Vijaybhai Patel =

Indian politician

Vijaybhai Rameshbhai Patel (born 1974) is an Indian politician from Gujarat. He is a member of the Gujarat Legislative Assembly from Dangs Assembly constituency, which is reserved for Scheduled Tribe community, in Dang district. He won the 2022 Gujarat Legislative Assembly election representing the Bharatiya Janata Party.

== Early life and education ==
Patel is from Dang district, Gujarat. He is the son of Rameshbhai Dangyabhai. He studied Class 10 at Shramjivi Secondary School, Valsad and passed the SSC examinations in 1989. He later did his Diploma in mechanical engineering in 1998 at Sarkari Polytechnic, Bhuj.

== Career ==
Patel won from Dangs Assembly constituency representing the Bharatiya Janata Party in the 2022 Gujarat Legislative Assembly election. He polled 62,533 votes and defeated his nearest rival, Mukesh Patel of the Indian National Congress, by a margin of 19,674 votes. He first became an MLA winning the 2007 Gujarat Legislative Assembly election. Later, he lost the next two elections in 2012 and 2017 to Mangalbhai Gavit of the Indian National Congress.
