= Agencies of British India =

Fully- or semi-autonomous administrative region of British India

An agency of British India was an internally autonomous or semi-autonomous unit of British Indian Empire whose external affairs were governed by an agent designated by the Viceroy of India.

== Description ==
The agencies varied in character from fully autonomous self-governing dependencies such as princely states, where the agent functioned mainly as a representative of the Viceroy, to tribal tracts which were integral parts of the British Empire and where the agent was completely in charge of law and order. The agent of a protected tract or princely state usually lived outside the territory in his charge, as opposed to a Resident who usually lived within his confines and was frequently the District Collector of the adjoining British district.

Civil and criminal justice in agencies were usually administered through locally made laws, and the Indian Penal Code was not applicable by default in these agencies.

== List of agencies ==
Political agencies were created, merged or abolished at different times during the history of the British Raj. This list includes all agencies, regardless of the historical period.

- Aden Agency (1839 – 1859)
- Alwar Agency (belonging to Rajputana Agency)
- Bagelkhand Agency March 1871 / 1933
- Baluchistan Agency
- Banas Kantha Agency
- Baroda Agency
- Baroda and Gujarat Agency
- Baroda, Western States, and Gujarat Agency
- Bengal States Agency
- Bhopal Agency 1818 / 1947-08-15
- Bhopawar Agency 1882 / 1925 (merged with Malwa to form Malwa and Bhopawar Agency)
- Bikaner Agency (belonging to Rajputana Agency)
- Bundelkhand Agency 1811
- Central India Agency 1854
- Chhattisgarh Agency
- Cutch Agency
- Deccan States Agency 1930s
- Delhi Agency
- Eastern Rajputana States Agency (belonging to Rajputana Agency)
- Eastern States Agency 1930s
- Ganjam Hill Tracts Agency (Madras Presidency)
- Gilgit Agency
- Kotah-Jhalawar Agency (belonging to Rajputana Agency)
- Haraoti Agency
- Haraoti-Tonk Agency (belonging to Rajputana Agency)
- Kaira Agency
- Kathiawar Agency (Bombay Presidency)
- Kolaba Agency
- Kolhapur Agency
- Madras States Agency 1930s
- Mahi Kantha Agency (Bombay Presidency)
- Malwa Agency
  - 1895 / 1925 (merged with Bhopawar Agency to form Malwa and Bhopawar Agency)
  - 1934 / 1947
- Malwa and Bhopawar Agency 1925 / 1927 rename to Malwa and Southern States Agency
- Malwa and Southern States Agency 1927 renamed from Malwa and Bhopawar Agency / 1934 renamed to Malwa
- Nasik Agency
- North-East Frontier Agency (NEFA)
- North-West Frontier States Agency
- Orissa Agency 1905
- Palanpur Agency 1819 (belong to Bombay Presidency, merged 10 October 1924 in WISA)
- Punjab States Agency 1930s
- Rajputana Agency (consisting of three residencies and six agencies)
- Rewa Kantha Agency (Bombay Presidency)
- Sabar Kantha Agency
- South-West Frontier Agency (1833–1854)
- Surat Agency
- Thana Agency
- Vizagapatam Hill Tracts Agency (Madras Presidency)
- Western India States Agency (WISA)
- Western Rajputana States Agency (belonging to Rajputana Agency, part of Mewar Residency until 1906, when it was separated)
- Malakand Agency
- Hazara Tribal Agency
- Khyber Agency
- Kurram Agency
- North Waziristan Agency
- South Waziristan Agency

== See also ==
- Indian Political Service (IPS)
- Subdivisions of British India

== Sources and external links ==
- IPS Index, First Edition – Princely States Report
