= Gira River =

Coordinates: 21°02′N 73°32′E

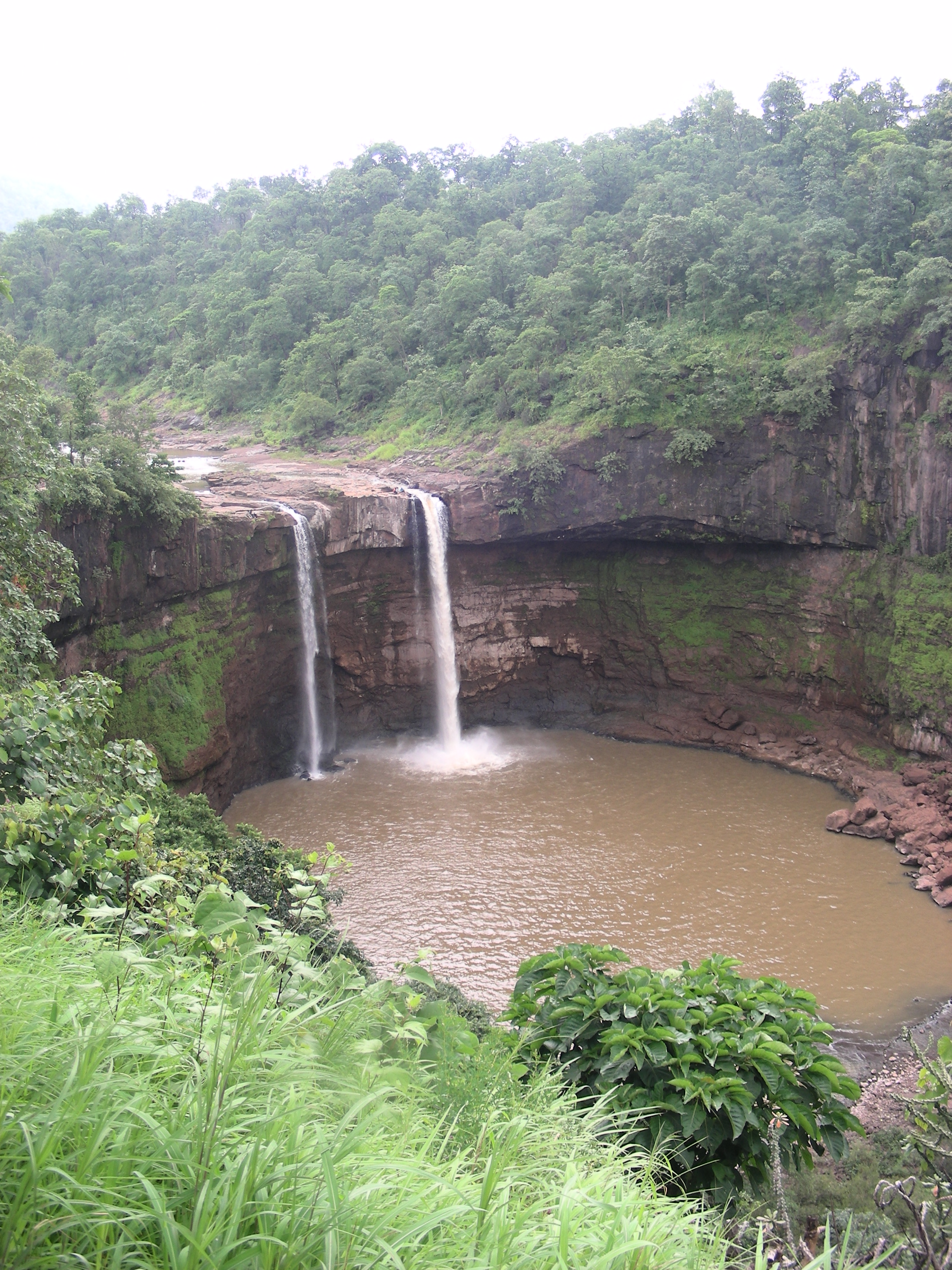
- Waterfall on Gira river near Girmal village

Location
- Country: India
- State: Gujarat

Physical characteristics
- Length: 129 km (80 mi)

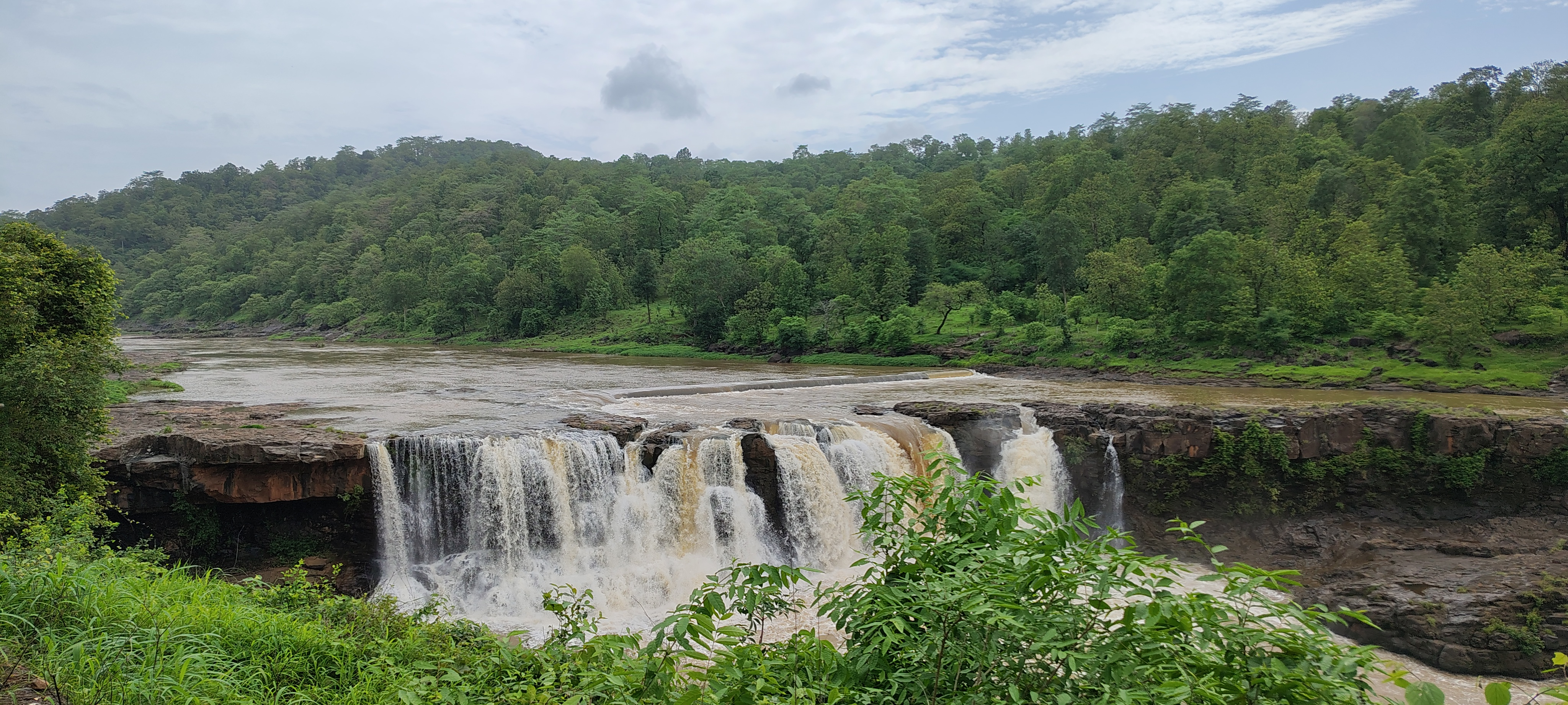

Gira is a river located in the Dang District of India. The river on its way touches Singana, Girmal, Bardipada and Divadiawan villages of Dang district and finally meets Mindhola River in the Songadh taluka.
