= Gira (surname) =

Gira is a surname. Notable people with the surname include:

- Camille Gira (1958–2018), Luxembourgish politician
- Catherine R. Gira (1932–2019), American educator and administrator
- Liudas Gira (1894–1946), Lithuanian writer
- Melissa Gira Grant (born 1978), American journalist
- Michael Gira (born 1954), American musician, author, and artist
