= Gira (bicycle rental) =

Bicycle rental scheme in Lisbon, Portugal

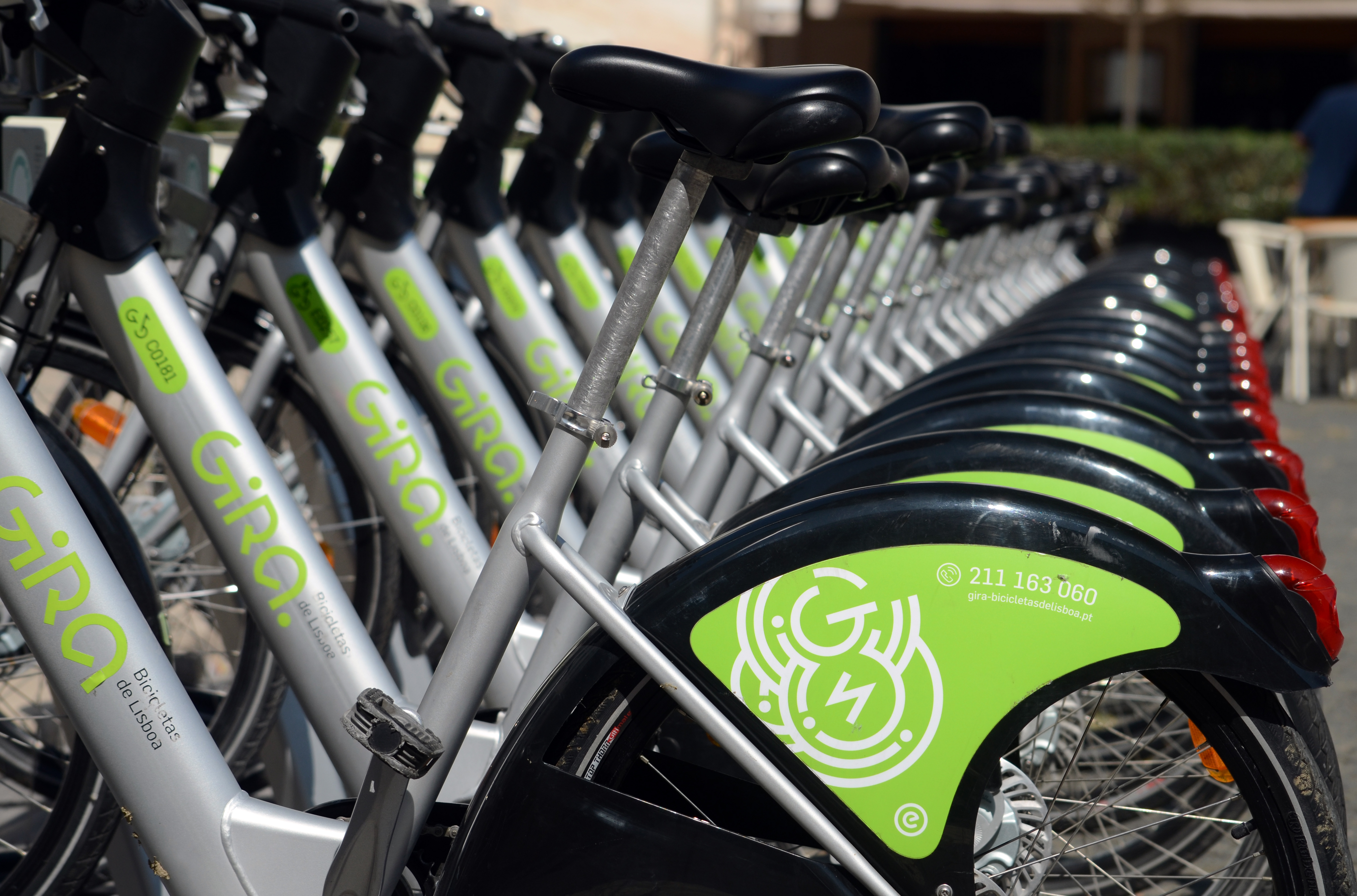
A Gira docking station.

Gira is a bike rental scheme in Lisbon, Portugal, which rents bikes to residents and tourists. Bikes with pedal-assist motors (e-bikes) are available in the scheme, which costs €2 a day for tourists and €15 a month or €25 a year for residents. Bikes must be docked at stations around the city, and are free for the first 45 minutes and €2 for each 45 minutes after that. The city hopes that there will be stations in all parishes of the city by 2020 when Lisbon is the European Green Capital.

The bikes can be unlocked with an app, although in 2018 there were reports that the app frequently crashed. It has also been reported that there are not enough e-bikes available. As of December 2020, there are 600 conventional and e-bikes in operation, with a further 700 e-bikes to be added in the first quarter of 2021. The number of docking stations will also rise from 84 to 164 by summer 2021.
