= Dang Assembly constituency =

Legislative Assembly constituency in Gujarat State, India

Coordinates: 20.8°N 73.71°E

Dang
- Constituency No. 173 for the Gujarat Legislative Assembly

Constituency details
- Country: India
- Region: Western India
- State: Gujarat
- District: Dang
- Lok Sabha constituency: Valsad
- Established: 2007
- Total electors: 193,369
- Reservation: ST

Member of Legislative Assembly
- 15th Gujarat Legislative Assembly
- Incumbent Vijaybhai Rameshbhai Patel
- Party: Bharatiya Janata Party
- Elected year: 2022

Dang is one of the 182 Legislative Assembly constituencies of Gujarat state in India. It is part of Dang district and is reserved for candidates belonging to the Scheduled Tribes.

== List of segments ==
This assembly seat represents the following segments,

1. Dang District entirely (Waghai, Ahwa and Subir Taluka)

== Members of the Legislative Assembly ==
Year	Member	Party
2007	Vijaybhai Patel	Bharatiya Janata Party
2012	Mangalbhai Gavit	Indian National Congress
2017	Mangalbhai Gavit	Indian National Congress
2020 by election	Vijaybhai Patel	Bharatiya Janata Party
2022	Vijaybhai Patel	Bharatiya Janata Party

== Election candidate ==
=== 2022 ===
-->

Gujarat Assembly election, 2022:Dangs Assembly constituency
Party	Candidate	Votes	%	±%
BJP	Vijaybhai Patel	62533	47.54	
INC	Patel Mukeshbhai Chandarbhai	42859	32.58	
AAP	Sunil Gamit	20822	15.83	
NOTA	None of the above	1910	1.45	
Majority		19,674	14.96	
Registered electors		188,585		

== Election results ==
=== 2020 by-poll ===
By-election, 2020: Dangs
Party	Candidate	Votes	%	±%
BJP	Vijaybhai Rameshbai Patel	94,006	69.56	
INC	Suryakantbhai Ratanbhai Gavit	33,911	25.09	
None of the Above	None of the Above	2,939	2.17	
Majority		60,095	44.47	
Turnout		1,35,148	75.83	
BJP gain from INC		Swing		

=== 2017 ===
2017 Gujarat Legislative Assembly election: Dangs
Party	Candidate	Votes	%	±%
INC	Mangalbhai Gavit	57,820	47.13	
BJP	Vijaybhai Patel	57,052	46.51	
IND	Dinesbhai Pawar	3,035	2.47	
Majority		768	0.62	
Turnout		1,22,672	73.70	
INC hold		Swing		

=== 2012 ===
2012 Gujarat Legislative Assembly election: Dangs
Party	Candidate	Votes	%	±%
INC	Mangalbhai Gavit	45,637	45.29	
BJP	Vijaybhai Patel	43,215	42.88	
Majority		2,422	2.40	
Turnout		1,00,773	69.79	
INC gain from BJP		Swing		

== See also ==
- Gujarat Legislative Assembly
- List of constituencies of the Gujarat Legislative Assembly
- Dang district
