= Dang district, India =

Dang district Dandakaranya
- District of Gujarat
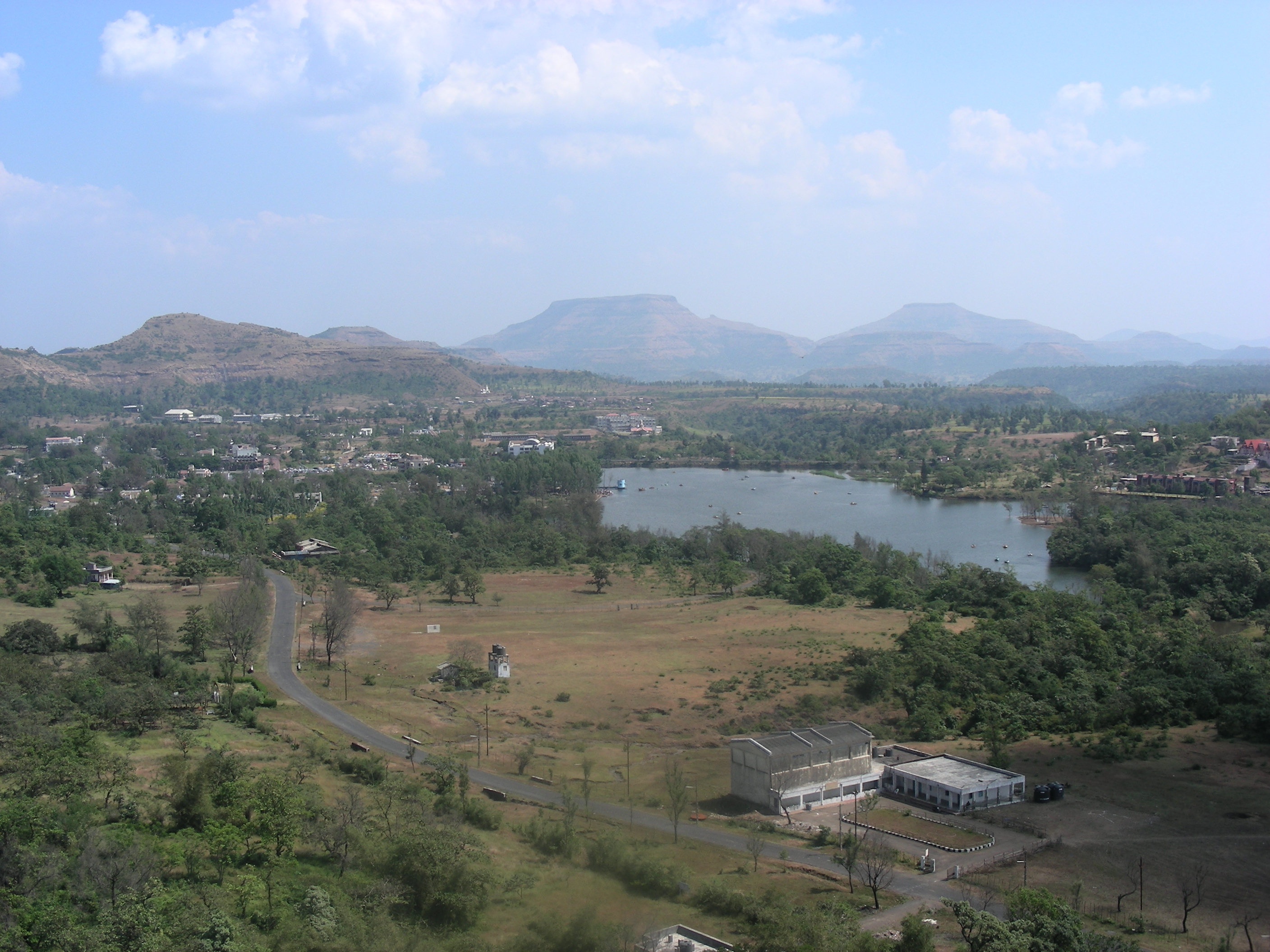
- Lakes near Saputara

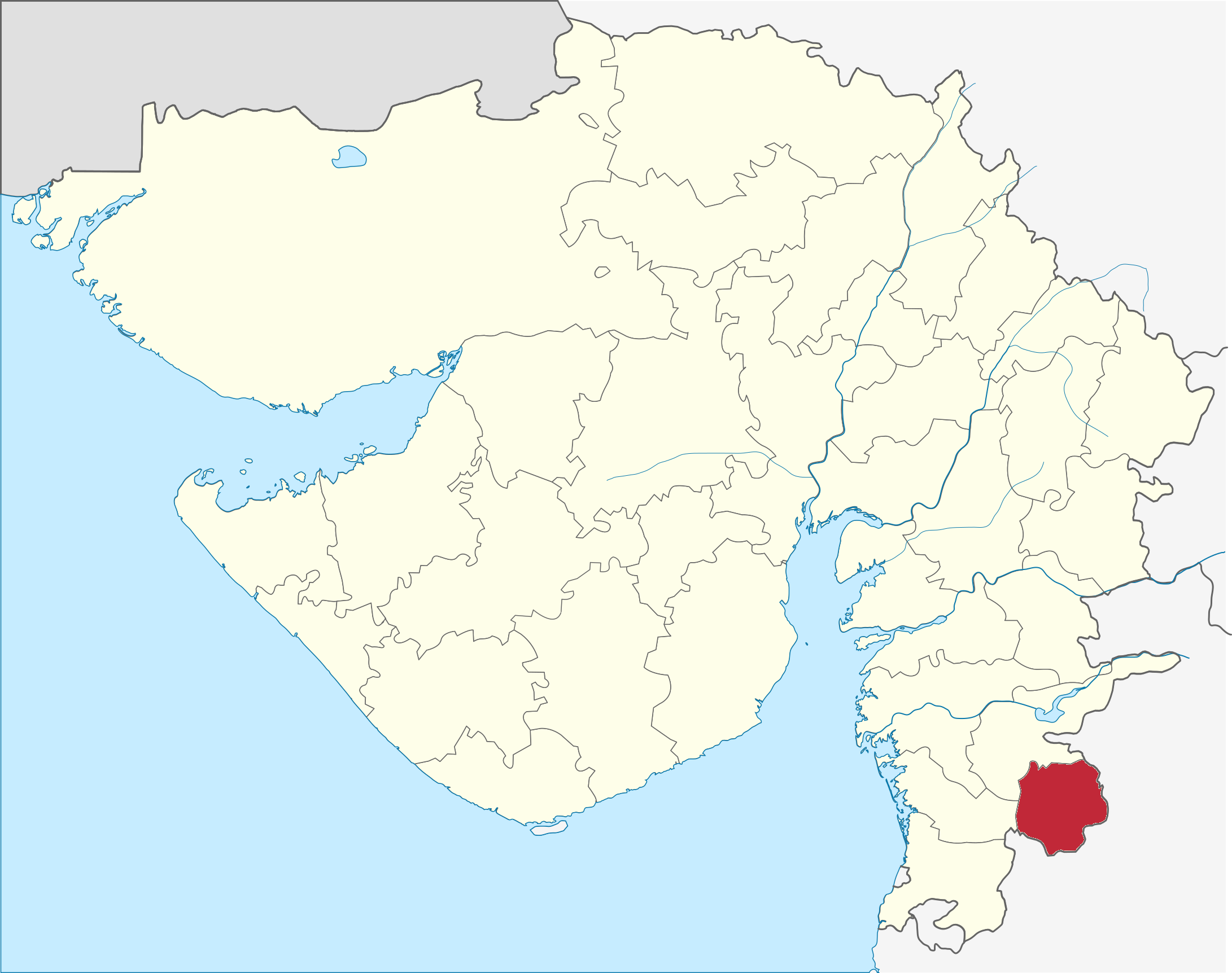
- Location of Dang district in Gujarat
- Interactive map of Dang district
- Coordinates: 20°45′32″N 73°41′19″E
- Country: India
- State: Gujarat
- Headquarters: Ahwa

Area
  - Total: 1,764 km^{2} (681 sq mi)

Population (2011)
  - Total: 228,291
  - Density: 129.4/km^{2} (335.2/sq mi)

Languages
  - Official: Gujarati
  - Spoken: Khandeshi, Gujarati, Bhili, Dangi, Marathi, Hindi
- Time zone: UTC+5:30 (IST)
- Vehicle registration: GJ-30
- Website: dangs.nic.in

Dang district is a district in the southeastern part of the state of Gujarat. The administrative headquarters of the district are located in Ahwa. Dang has an area of 1,764 km^{2} and a population of 228,291 (as of 2011). As of 2011, it is the least populous of Gujarat's 33 districts. As per the Planning Commission, Dang is one of the most economically distressed districts out of 640 districts in India. 94% of the population belongs to one of the scheduled tribes. The five Kings of Dangs are the only hereditary royals in India whose titles are currently recognized by the government owing to an agreement between the East India Company and the Dang kings in 1842.

== Etymology ==
The origin of the name of the Dang is uncertain. In common parlance the word 'dang' means a hilly village. There is another connotation of the word 'dang' which means bamboo (a place of bamboo). The name is also associated with Hindu mythology. It is related to the Dandakaranya of the Ramayana. It is said that during the exile, Rama passed through this area on his way to Nashik.

== Kings of Dang ==
The Dangs (orange) within Surat Agency, India

Before Independence several wars were fought between the five tribal kings of Dang and the Company. According to the history of Dang, the biggest war to took place at 'Lashkaria Amba', in when the kings of all the five states joined to protect Dang from the British. The British were beaten and agreed to a compromise.

As per the treaty signed in 1842 the Company allowed to use the forests and their natural products against which they had to pay around 3,000 silver coins to the five kings. Currently the kings receive a yearly political pension by the Government of India, which is the main source of their income. This payment is continued even though all privy purses for the Princely states of India were stopped in 1970 since the agreement was between then monarchy of Dangs and the Government of India, not the Crown.

At the end of each fiscal year during Holi, the kings gather in Ahwa for a traditional royal ceremony, in their richly decorated buggies and bands with tribal dancers, to receive the payment as per the agreement of 1842. In ancient Indian Scriptures Dang is known as Danda Aranyaka, meaning 'Bamboo forest'. Recently the Dangs Kings have urged the government to protect their depleting forest cover due to illegal logging.

The five kingdoms are Daher-Amala, Linga, Gadhvi, Vasurna and Pimpri.

=== Rulers ===
1. Linga - Raja Bhawarsinh
2. Daher-Amala - Raja Tapatrao Anandrao Pawar
3. Gadhvi - Raja Karan Singh Yashwantrao Pawar
4. Vasurna - Raja Dhanrajsinh Chandrasinh Suryavanshi
5. Pimpri - Raja Trikamrao Sahebrao Pawar

=== Dang States ===
Historically there were 14 Dang states in the region:

- Amala
- Avchar
- Bilbari
- Chinchli Gaded
- Derbhavti
- Gadvi
- Jhari Gharkhadi
- Kirli
- Palasvihir
- Pimpladevi
- Pimpri
- Shivbara
- Vadhyawan
- Vasurna

== Demographics ==
Historical population
Year	Pop.	±% p.a.
1901	18,333	—
1911	28,926	+4.67%
1921	24,142	−1.79%
1931	33,495	+3.33%
1941	40,236	+1.85%
1951	47,282	+1.63%
1961	71,567	+4.23%
1971	94,185	+2.78%
1981	113,664	+1.90%
1991	144,091	+2.40%
2001	186,729	+2.63%
2011	228,291	+2.03%

Religions in Dang district (2011)
Hinduism	89.16%
Christianity	8.77%
Islam	1.57%
Other or not stated	0.50%
Distribution of religions

According to the 2011 census, Dang district has a population of 228,291, roughly equal to the nation of Vanuatu. This gives it a ranking of 587th in India (out of a total of 640). The district has a population density of 129 inhabitants per square kilometre (330/sq mi). Its population growth rate over the decade 2001-2011 was 21.44%. Dang has a sex ratio of 1007 females for every 1000 males, and literacy rate of 76.8%. 10.81% of the population lives in urban areas. Scheduled Castes and Scheduled Tribes make up 0.43% and 94.65% of the population respectively.

=== Language ===
Languages in Dang District (2011)
1. Dangi (59.6%)
2. Gujarati (32.5%)
3. Gamit (3.18%)
4. Marathi (1.20%)
5. Hindi (1.21%)
6. Other (1.54%)

At the time of the 2011 Census of India, 59.55% of the population in the district spoke Dangi, 32.53% Gujarati, 3.18% Gamit, 1.99% Marathi and 1.21% Hindi as their first language.

== Politics ==
District	No.	Constituency	Name	Party	Remarks
Dang	173	Dangs (ST)	Vijaybhai Patel		

== Economy ==
In 2006 the Ministry of Panchayati Raj named Dang District as an economically distressed district, one of 250 out of a total of 640 districts. It is one of the six districts in Gujarat currently receiving funds from the Backward Regions Grant Fund Programme (BRGF).

== Forest ==
Dang District has part of a forest that includes Purna Wildlife Sanctuary, which is shared between the districts of Dang and Tapi in Gujarat and Nandurbar District in Maharashtra, and Vansda National Park in Navsari District, which shares a continuous tract of forest with Valsad district.

A rusty-spotted cat was sighted for the time in 1991 in Shoolpaneshwar Wildlife Sanctuary.

In Purna and Ratanmahal Wildlife Sanctuaries, eight bird species are considered locally extinct, including Indian grey hornbill, jungle bush quail, red spurfowl and large woodshrike. Also, Bengal tiger, Indian giant squirrel and gaur are reportedly extinct in Gujarat.

== Talukas ==
1. Subir
2. Waghai
3. Ahwa

== Rivers of district ==
- Purna River
- Ambika River
- Gira River
- Khapri River
- Dhodad River

== See also ==
- Valley and District of Dang in Nepal
- Dang, Uttar Pradesh
- Dang, Iran
- Gulf of Khambhat

== Places of interest ==
- Botanic Garden, Waghai - Large Government Ayurvedic Medicinal Garden (Botanical Garden) near Waghai
- Gira Falls on Ambika River near Waghai
- Hill stations: Saputara and Don
- Gira Falls on Gira River at Girmal village
- Rupgadh Fort
- Shabri Dham and Pampa Sarovar at Subir
