= Western India States Agency =

Agency of British India

- Agency of British India
- 1924–1944
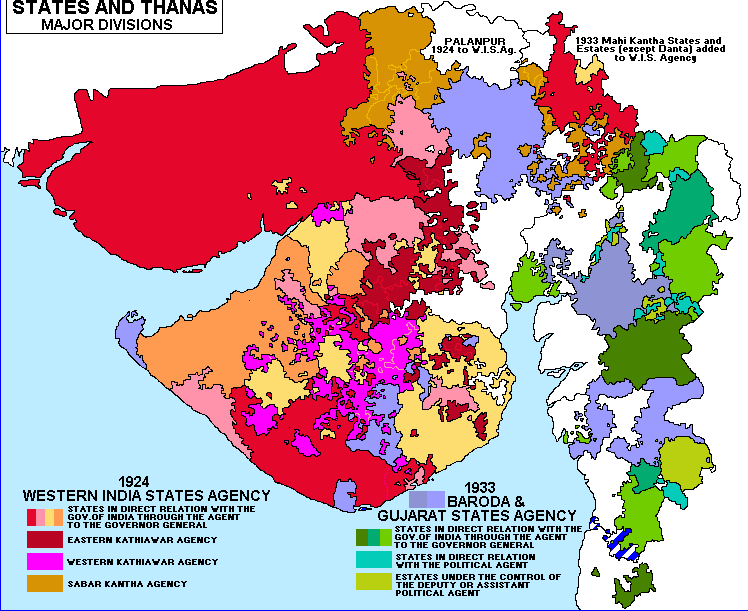
- Map of the area of the Western India States Agency and the Baroda and Gujarat States Agency during the British Raj
- Area
  - 1941: 16,558 km^{2} (6,393 sq mi)
- Population
  - 1941: 5,220,011
- History
  - Established: 1924
  - Formation of the Baroda, Western India and Gujarat States Agency: 1944
Preceded by
Kathiawar Agency
Cutch Agency
Palanpur Agency
Mahi Kantha Agency
Succeeded by
Baroda, Western India and Gujarat States Agency

The Western India States Agency (WISA) was one of the agencies of British India. This agency was formed on 10 October 1924 as a part of the implementation of the Montague Chelmsford report on constitutional reforms. It was formed by merging the areas under the erstwhile Kathiawar, Cutch (covering only Kutch state) and Palanpur agencies.

At one time or another between 1924 and 1944, 435 princely states were included in this agency, roughly covering the present Gujarat state, but only eighteen out of these were salute states. Some 163 Talukas and Estates were included in this Agency: these were mostly petty (e)states, some no larger than a town or village.

== Agencies ==
The divisions of the Western India States Agency were :

- Eastern Kathiawar Agency (from 1926 onwards)
  - Sabar Kantha Agency (merged with Eastern Kathiawar Agency on 1 September 1943)
    - Banas Kantha Agency (former Palanpur Agency) and Mahi Kantha Agency merged in 1933 to form Sabarkantha Agency in 1933 except Danta and Palanpur states which went to Rajputana Agency.
- Western Kathiawar Agency (from 1926 onwards)

== History ==
The city of Rajkot became the headquarters of this new agency and C.C. Watson became its first Agent to the Governor General of British India (AGG). Its boundary was modified twice, in 1933 and 1943. On 5 November 1944 it was merged with the Baroda and Gujarat States Agency to form the larger Baroda, Western India and Gujarat States Agency.

In 1924, Palanpur Agency was merged into the Western India States Agency and placed under the political control of the Government of India. The designation of Palanpur Agency was changed to Banas Kantha Agency in 1925 and Palanpur State was transferred to the Rajputana Agency in 1933. Also in 1933, the states of the Mahi Kantha Agency, except for Danta were included in this agency.

In 1941, the area covered by this agency was 39,688 square miles (102,800 km^{2}) and the population was 52,20,011.

== Chief officers ==
=== Agent to the Governor-General and Resident, Western States ===
- 10 Oct 1924 – 15 July 1926 Charles Cuningham Watson (1st time) (born 1874 – died 1934)
- 16 July 1926 – Nov 1926 A.D. Macpherson (acting)
- 21 Nov 1926 – 17 October 1927 Sir Charles Watson (2nd time) (s.a.)
- 18 Oct 1927 – 18 May 1928 Edward Herbert Kealy (1st time) (born 1873 – d. 19..) (acting to 22 April 1928)
- 19 May 1928 – Apr 1929 H.S. Strong (acting)
- 3 April 1929 – 23 October 1929 Terence Humphrey Keyes (acting)
- 24 Oct 1929 – Aug 1931 Edward Herbert Kealy (2nd time) (s.a.)
- 15 Aug 1931 – Aug 1932 A.H.E. Mosse (acting)
- 17 Aug 1932 – 26 May 1933 J. Courtenay Latimer (acting to 16 February 1933)
- 27 May 1933 – 13 October 1933 J.C. Tate (acting)
- 14 Oct 1933 – 5 June 1936 Courtenay Latimer (1st time) (born 1880 – d. 1944)
- 6 June 1936 – 1 April 1937 J. de la Hay Gordon (acting)
- 1 November 1936 – 31 March 1937 Sir Courtenay Latimer (2nd time) (s.a.)

=== Residents for the Western India States Agency ===
- 1 April 1937 – 10 October 1937 Sir Courtenay Latimer (s.a.)
- 11 Oct 1937 – 31 January 1941 Edmund Currey Gibson (1st time) (born 1886 – d. 19..) (acting to 16 May 1939)
- 1 February 1941 – 14 March 1941 G.B. Williams (acting)
- 15 Mar 1941 – 3 April 1942 M.C. Sinclair (acting)
- 4 April 1942 – 14 April 1942 R.W. Parkes (acting)
- April 1942 – Nov 1942 Edmund Currey Gibson (2nd time) (s.a.)
- 2 November 1942 – 5 September 1944 Philip Gaisford (acting to 3 January 1944)
- 6 September 1944 – 5 November 1944 Cyril Percy Hancock

== See also ==
- Surat Agency
