= Baji Rao II =

Peshwa of the Maratha Empire

Shrimant Peshwa Maharajadhiraja Vakil-ul-Mutlaq Baji Rao II
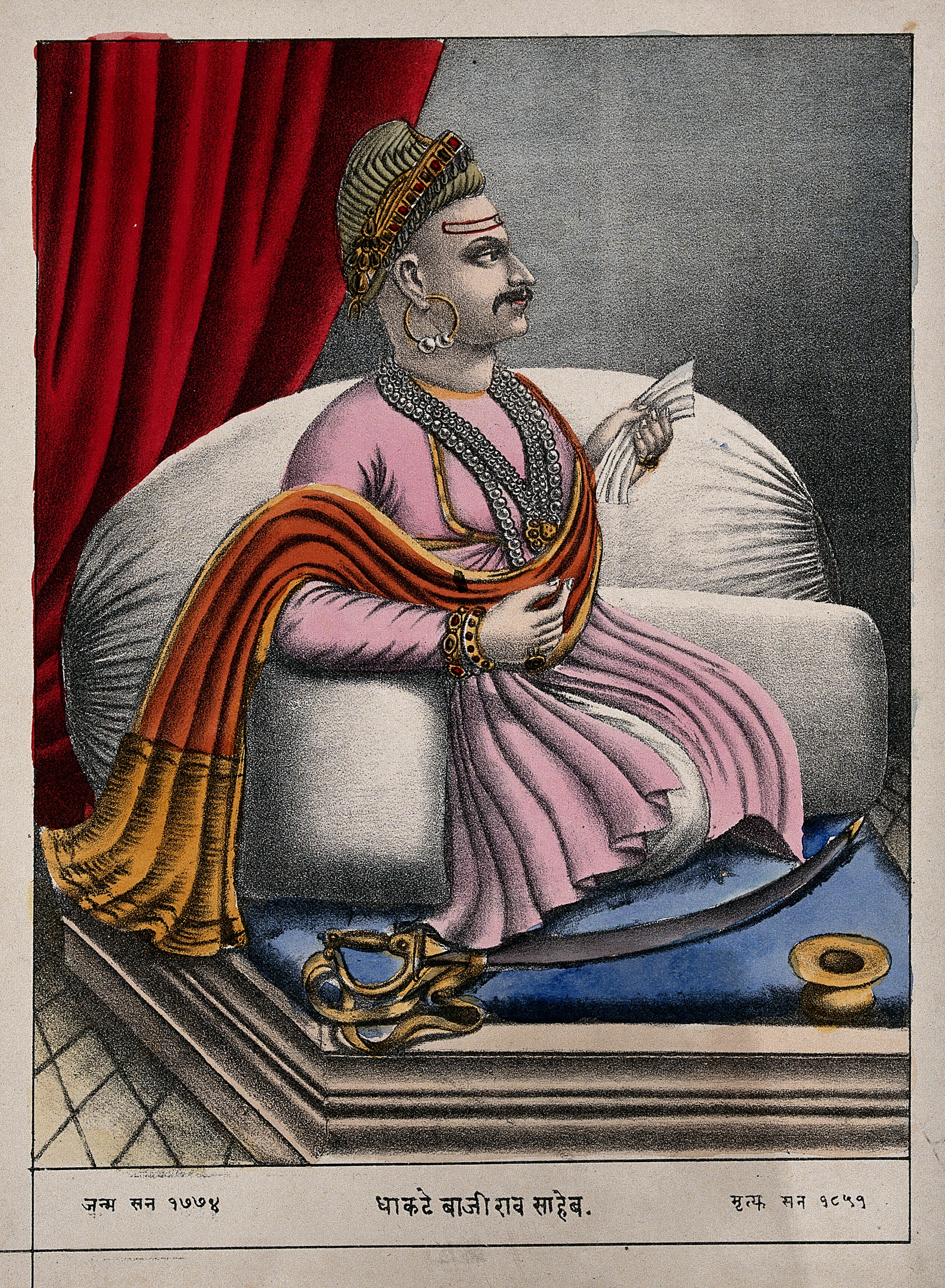

13th Peshwa of the Maratha Empire
- In office 6 December 1796 – 25 October 1802
- Monarchs: Shahu II; Pratap Singh
- Preceded by: Madhavrao II
- Succeeded by: Amrut Rao
- In office 13 May 1803 – 3 June 1818
- Preceded by: Amrut Rao
- Succeeded by: Monarchy abolished (Note: Nana Saheb II as the titular Peshwa)

Personal details
- Born: 10 January 1775 Dhar, Indore State, Maratha Empire (present-day Madhya Pradesh, India)
- Died: 28 January 1851 (aged 76) Bithur, North-Western Provinces, Company Raj (present-day Uttar Pradesh, India)
- Spouse: Warnashi Bai
- Children: Nana Saheb II (adopted)
- Parents: Raghunath Rao (father); Anandibai (mother)

Baji Rao II (10 January 1775 – 28 January 1851) was the 13th and last Peshwa of the Maratha Confederacy. He served from 1796 until his deposition in 1802, and again from 1803 to 1818. Initially installed as a nominal ruler by powerful Maratha nobles, Baji Rao II's authority was soon undermined by internal factionalism. Following his defeat by rival chiefs, he fled from the Maratha capital at Poona and, in 1802, signed the Treaty of Bassein with the British East India Company.

This led to the Second Anglo-Maratha War (1803–1805), which ended with a British victory and Baji Rao II's restoration as Peshwa under British protection. Still, there were some skirmishes between the Maratha Empire and the East India Company because of Bajirao's support to Napoleon in the Napoleonic Wars. In 1817, tensions with the British resurfaced when they supported the Gaekwads of Baroda in a revenue dispute, prompting Baji Rao II to join other Maratha chiefs in the Third Anglo-Maratha War (1817–1818). After a series of defeats, he surrendered to the British and was abolished, which ultimately overthrew the Maratha Empire and made the Company as the dominant power in the Indian subcontinent. After his deposition, he was exiled from Deccan to Bithur, near Kanpur, where he was granted an estate along with an annual pension, only under British protection.

== Personal life ==
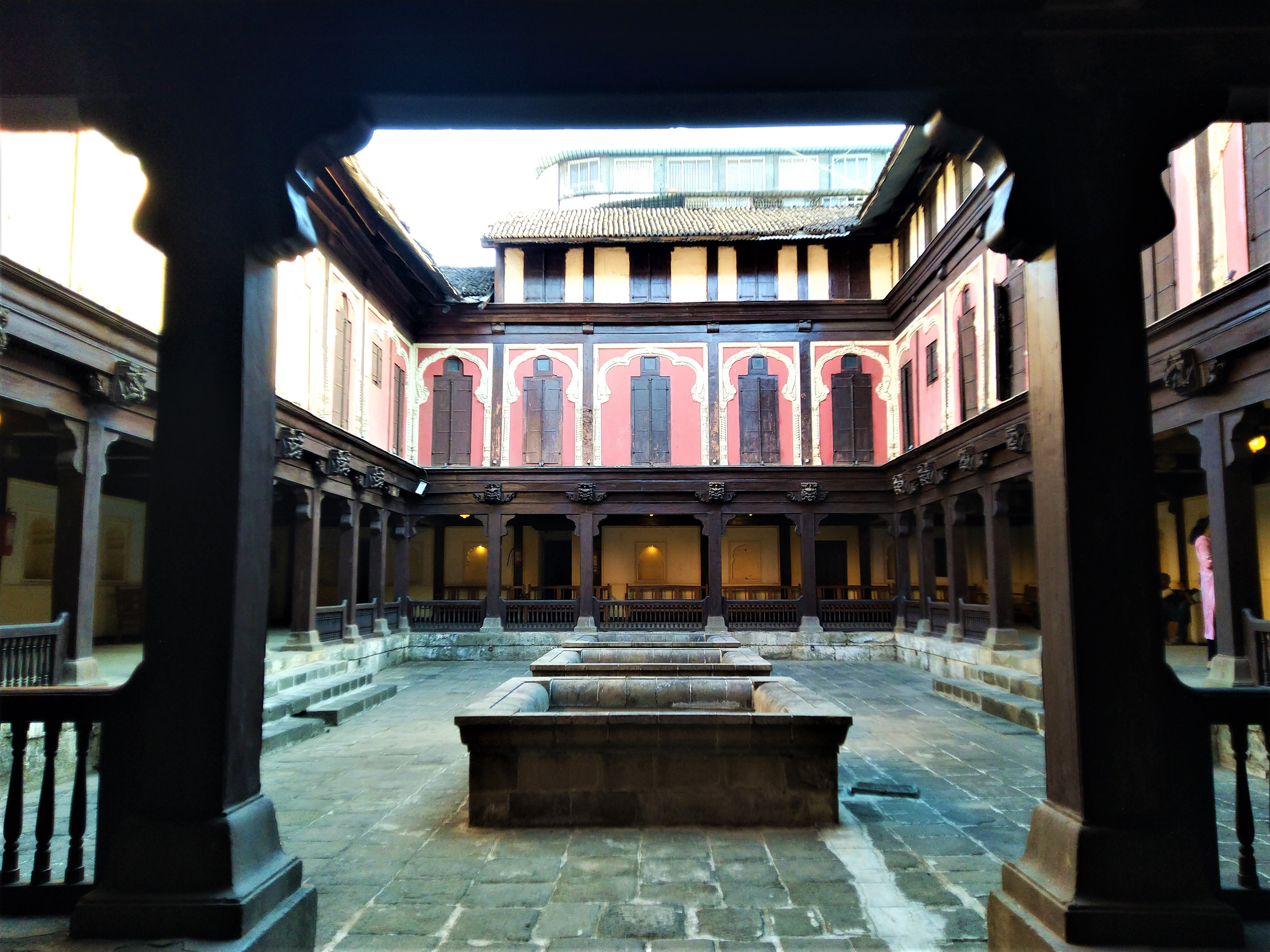
Courtyard of the Vishrambaug Wada, residence of Bajirao II until 1818

Baji Rao II was born on 10 January 1775 to Raghunathrao, a former Peshwa, and his wife Anandibai. Raghunathrao's alliance with the British East India Company had led to the First Anglo-Maratha War (1775–1782), which concluded with the Treaty of Salbai in 1782. At the time of Baji Rao II's birth, both of his parents were under confinement by the ruling Peshwa's council. He and his brothers spent their early years in captivity, with limited access to education and other privileges.

After the death of Peshwa Madhavrao II in 1795, who left no heir, a succession crisis broke out among the Maratha nobility. The influential general Daulat Rao Scindia and the minister Nana Fadnavis eventually installed Baji Rao II as a puppet Peshwa in 1796. His accession was controversial due to lingering suspicion surrounding his parents, who were believed by some to have been involved in the murder of Peshwa Narayanrao in 1773. As a result, Baji Rao II faced prejudice and mistrust from sections of the Maratha elite and the public.

Despite these challenges, contemporary accounts describe him as an able administrator who undertook developmental works in Poona, though his political and military leadership was often criticized as indecisive.

Social reformer Pandita Ramabai later criticized Baji Rao II for allegedly marrying, at around 60 years of age, a girl said to be aged nine or ten, citing it as an example of the prevalence of child marriage among Maratha nobility.

== Holkar's conquest of Poona ==
After the death of Nana Fadnavis in 1800, Daulat Rao Scindia took complete control of the Peshwa's administration. As Scindia began consolidating power and removing rivals within the government, Baji Rao II grew increasingly concerned for his safety and sought assistance from the British Resident at Poona, Colonel William Palmer. At that time, Arthur Wellesley was stationed in the southern Maratha territories, having recently concluded a campaign against Dhondia Wagh.

Although Baji Rao II initially hesitated to sign a treaty with the British, events in 1802 forced his hand. That year, Scindia's rival, Yashwant Rao Holkar, advanced toward Poona, claiming allegiance to the Peshwa and asserting that his intention was to free the city from Scindia's dominance. Relations between Holkar and the Peshwa, however, were tense, as Baji Rao II had previously ordered the execution of Holkar's brother, Vithoji Rao Holkar. Baji Rao II requested military assistance from Scindia, who was then away from Poona. Scindia's army arrived on 22 October 1802, but on 25 October, Holkar defeated the combined forces of Scindia and the Peshwa in the Battle of Hadapsar.

On the morning of 25 October, before the battle, Baji Rao II had already sent preliminary terms for a treaty to the British. After Holkar's victory, the Peshwa fled from Hadapsar to Parvati and took refuge at Sinhagad. He later travelled via the Konkan coast to Vasai (then known as Bassein), where he sought British support in Bombay.

In Poona, Holkar established a provisional administration headed by his adoptive brother, Amrut Rao, who served as the nominal Peshwa.

His flight from Poona and reliance on British assistance drew criticism from both contemporaries and later historians, who contrasted his actions with the military prowess of his grandfather, Bajirao I.

== Treaty with the British ==
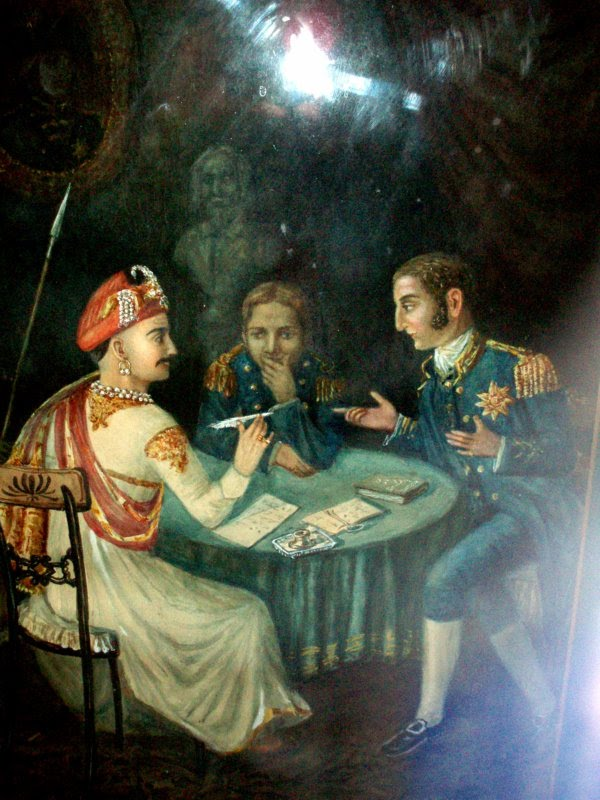
Bajirao II meeting with British East India Company officials

In December 1802, Baji Rao II concluded the Treaty of Bassein with the British East India Company. Under the terms of the treaty, the British agreed to reinstate him as Peshwa in exchange for the right to station a subsidiary force of 6,000 infantry, equipped with artillery and commanded by British officers, within Maratha territory. The Peshwa was required to bear the expenses of this force and to accept the appointment of a permanent British Resident at Poona.

The treaty provoked strong opposition among other Maratha chiefs, particularly Yashwant Rao Holkar and Daulat Rao Scindia, who viewed it as a violation of Maratha sovereignty. Their resistance to British involvement in Maratha affairs led to the Second Anglo-Maratha War (1803–1805).

The war ended in a decisive British victory. Internal divisions within the Maratha Confederacy—especially the rivalry between the Holkars and Scindias—contributed to their defeat. Some contemporary accounts also attributed the outcome to the unreliability of Scindia's European officers, who commanded many of the imported artillery pieces in the Maratha army.

== Third Anglo-Maratha War ==
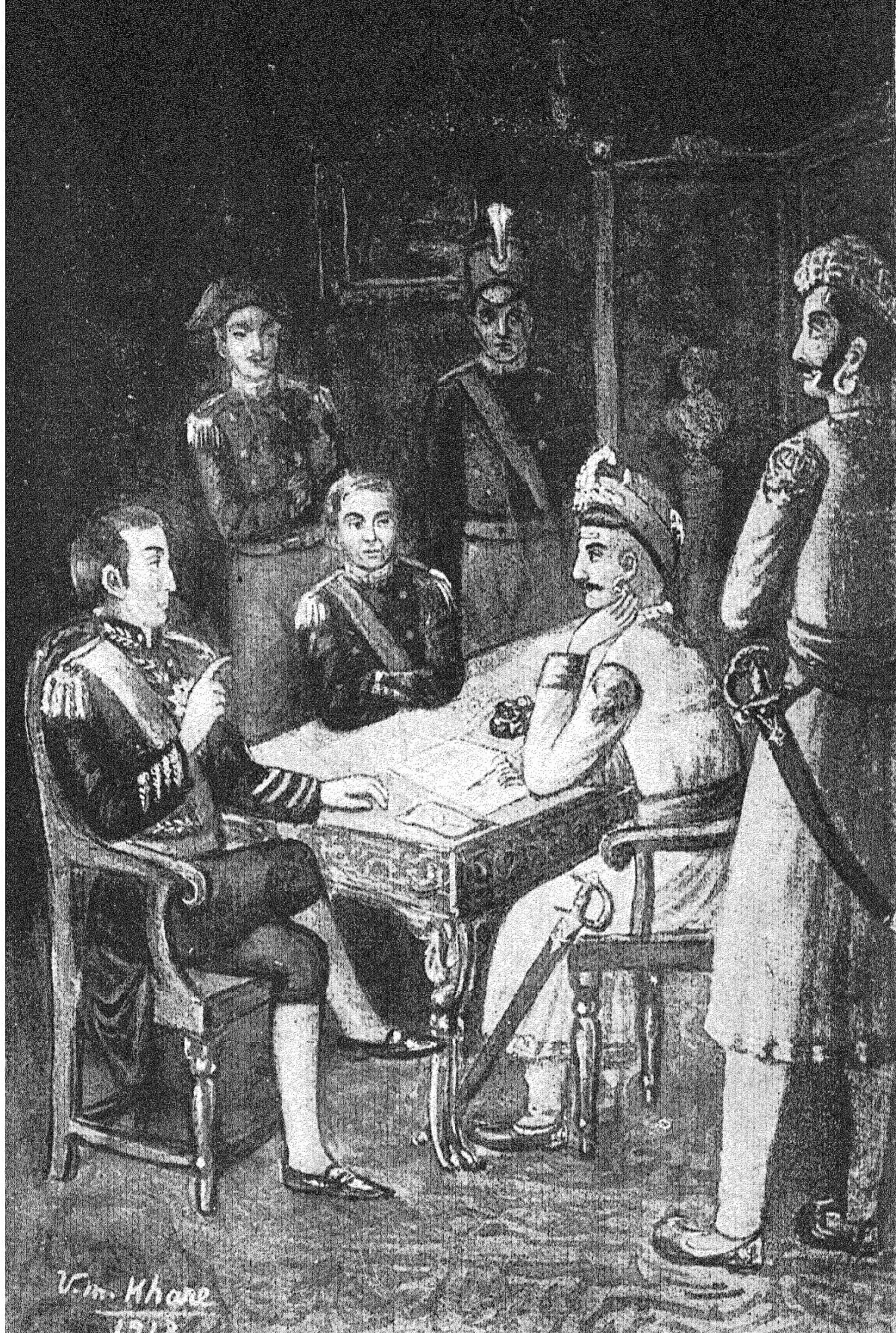
Bajirao II signs the Treaty of Bassein in 1802.

Raids by the Pindaris, irregular horsemen operating within Maratha territories, into British-controlled areas, ultimately led to the Third Anglo-Maratha War (1817–1818), which ended in the defeat of the Bhonsles, Holkars, and other Maratha chiefs.

In the mid-1810s, the British East India Company intervened in a financial dispute between the Peshwa and the Gaekwads of Baroda over revenue sharing. On 13 June 1817, Baji Rao II was compelled to sign the Treaty of Poona, under which he renounced claims to Gaekwad revenues and ceded significant territory to the British. The agreement effectively abolished the Peshwa's nominal suzerainty over other Maratha chiefs, formally bringing the Maratha Confederacy to an end.

On 5 November 1817, hostilities broke out when the Peshwa's forces, led by his legal adviser Mor Dixit, attacked the British Residency at Pune. The ensuing Battle of Khadki (also known as the Battle of Kirkee) resulted in a British victory.

Among the Peshwa's troops were the Pinto brothers, José António and Francisco, members of a Goan noble family who had fled Goa after participating in the Conspiracy of the Pintos.

Following the defeat at Khadki, Baji Rao II's forces regrouped near Garpir on Solapur Road to intercept British reinforcements from Jalna, but the defection of one of his commanders, Sardar Ghorpade Sondurkar, forced the army to withdraw.

Subsequently, the Peshwa's forces captured Chakan Fort from the British. Meanwhile, the British placed Poona under the command of Colonel Burr, while General Joseph Smith pursued Baji Rao II's army. Late in December 1817, Smith's troops from Shirur engaged the Peshwa's forces at the Battle of Koregaon, where his troops were repelled and forced to retreat upon learning of the approach of additional Company reinforcements.

== Surrender and retirement ==
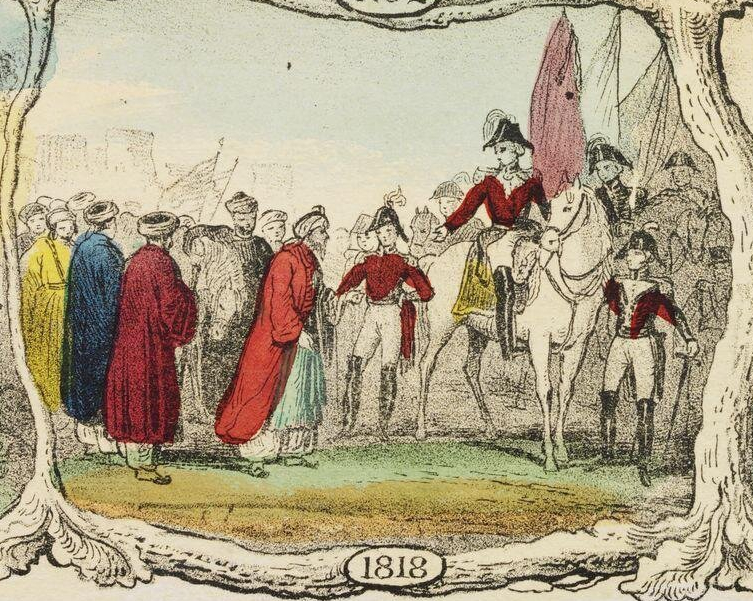
Surrender of Bajirao II c.1818

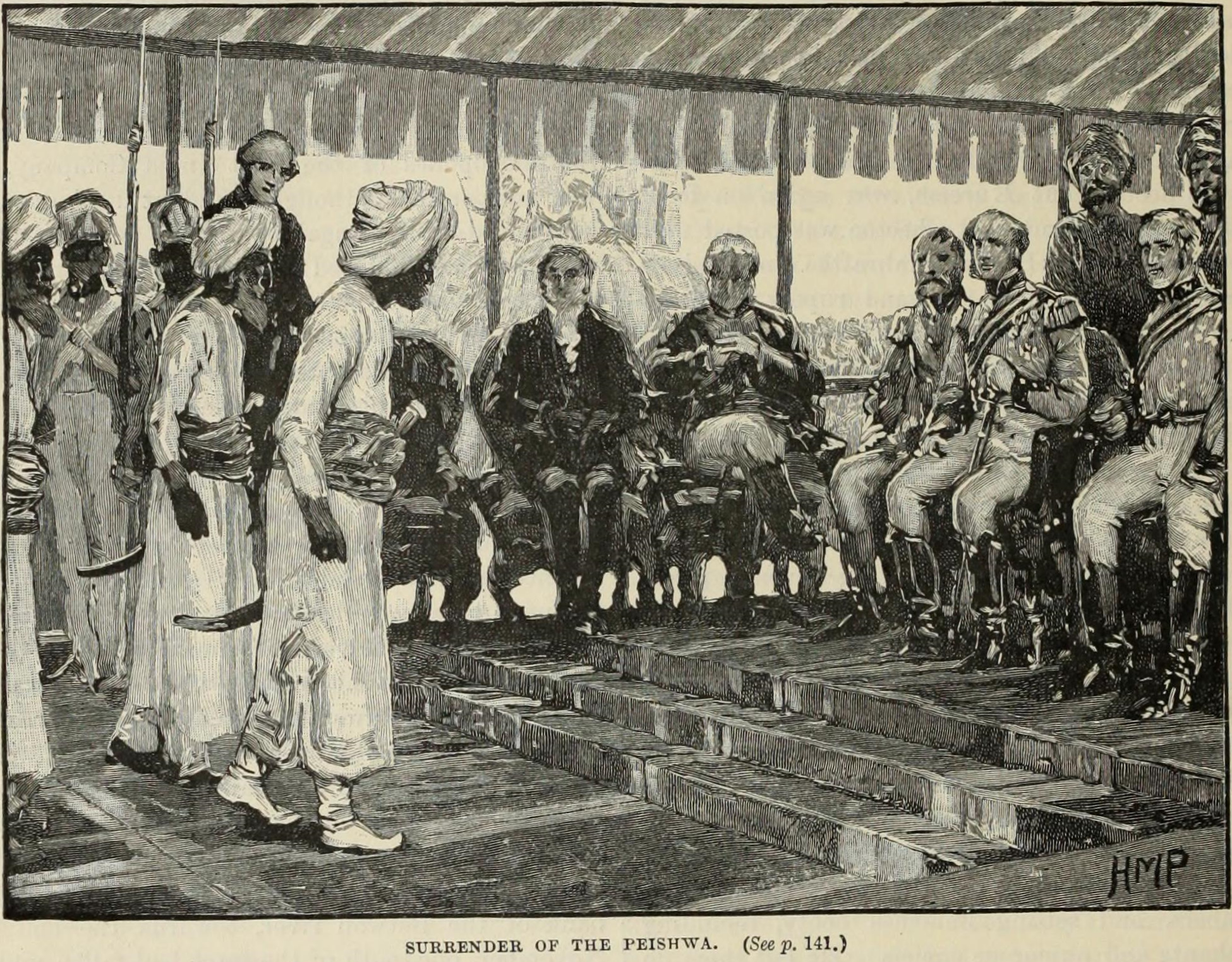
Surrender of Bajirao II after the Third Anglo-Maratha War in 1818

After several months of pursuit by five British columns, Baji Rao II surrendered to John Malcolm in 1818. Support from the Maratha chiefs Scindia, Holkar, and Bhosle did not materialize during his flight. Malcolm negotiated terms allowing Baji Rao II to retain his personal fortune and receive an annual pension of £80,000–£100,000. In return, he was required to reside at a location designated by the British with his retainers, renounce all claims to his heritage, and refrain from using the title of Peshwa, although he was permitted to use the title Maharaja. The treaty was ratified by Francis Rawdon-Hastings, based on the assumption that Baji Rao II, then over 40 years old, would not live long.

The British selected Bithur, a village on the right bank of the Ganges near Kanpur, as his place of residence. The estate covered six square miles and, along with his relatives and attendants who moved from Poona, had a population of approximately 15,000. He lived in Bithur for 33 years, dying in 1851.

Accounts from the Court of Gwalior describe Baji Rao II's life in exile. He was reportedly haunted by the ghost of Narayanrao, the ninth Peshwa, who had been allegedly murdered with the complicity of Baji Rao II's parents. To address this, he consulted priests from Pandharpur, a temple town on the banks of the Chandrabhaga River, who performed rituals to exorcise the spirit. In gratitude, he commissioned a riverside embankment in Pandharpur, which still bears his name. After his exile to Bithur, he continued performing religious activity and rituals, including constructing temples, bathing ghats, and observing fasts, as prescribed by priests in Varanasi.

During the Indian Rebellion of 1857, after the British recaptured Kanpur under Henry Havelock and later James Hope Grant, Bithur was sacked and burned. The residence of Baji Rao II and many buildings housing his extended family were destroyed. His adopted son, Nana Saheb II, had already escaped by then.

== In popular culture ==
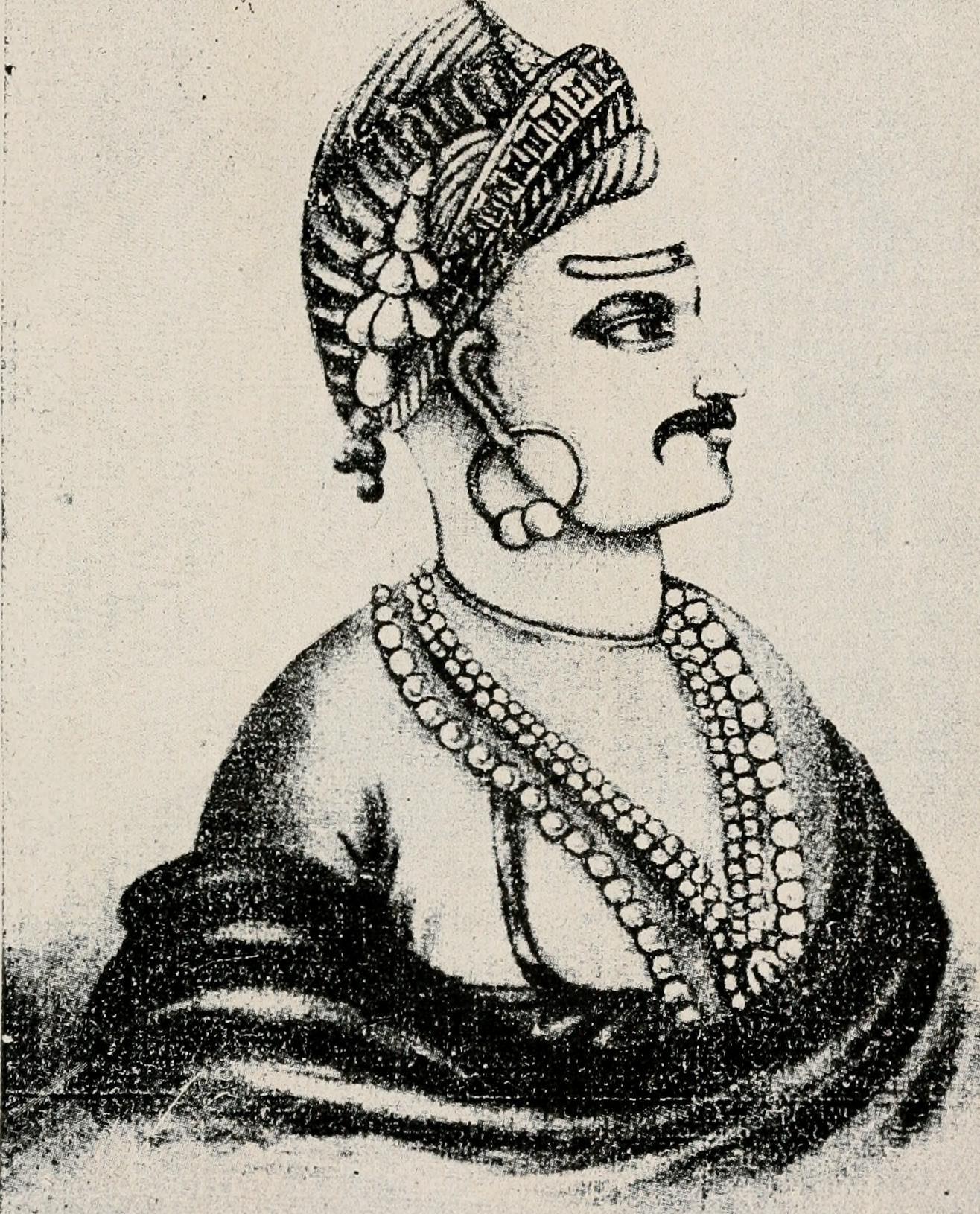
Sketch of Bajirao II

The Marathi historical novelist N. S. Inamdar wrote two novels that focus on the career of Bajirao II, presenting a perspective that contrasts with traditional historical portrayals. Inamdar depicts him as a ruler who faced personal and political challenges, including being imprisoned in childhood for a crime allegedly committed by his mother, Anandibai, and taking up the role of Peshwa without a solid understanding of politics.

The first novel, Jhep (1963), is based on the life of Trimbakji Dengle, a guard of the Peshwa who rose to become his chief minister (Karbhari). Trimbakji helped Baji Rao II restore the Peshwai, or Peshwa rule, after the Second Anglo-Maratha War, and attempted to form a coalition with some kings to resist British rule. He was implicated in the murder of Gangadhar Shastri, chief minister of the Gaekwad, and arrested. The Peshwa considered starting a war to secure Trimbakji's release, but Trimbakji advised him to wait for a more opportune moment.

The second novel, Mantravegala (1969), serves as a continuation of Jhep. While Jhep focuses primarily on Trimbakji's personal life, Mantravegala explores Baji Rao II's experiences between 1817 and 1818, encompassing the Third Anglo-Maratha War. In the novel, he is depicted as frustrated with British interference in Maratha affairs and secretly planning to resist them. He arranges the release of Trimbakji from British imprisonment without acknowledging his involvement to Mountstuart Elphinstone. During this period, some Maratha chieftains support the Pindaris, who harass British territories. Baji Rao II is unable to prevent them, leading to escalation into the Anglo-Maratha conflict. The narrative portrays his early military successes and eventual defeat by the British, culminating in his exile to Bithur. Inamdar's work highlights his personal struggles, including his resentment of the British, reflections on past political decisions such as refusing to ally with Yashwantrao Holkar, his sorrow over the loss of his children, and his emotional farewell to Trimbakji.

=== Television & film ===
- In the 2001 Hindi historical drama series 1857 Kranti, telecasted on DD National, Baji Rao II is played by Lalit Mohan Tiwari.
- In the 2019 Hindi film Manikarnika: The Queen of Jhansi, Suresh Oberoi played the character of Baji Rao II.

== Notes ==
Preceded by Madhavrao II	Peshwa; 1795–1851	Succeeded by Nana Sahib
