= Amfioensociëteit =

Dutch colonial empire joint-stock company

Society for the Trade in Amfioen
- Native name: Societeit tot den handel in amphioen
- Type: Chartered company
- Industry: Opium
- Founded: 5-year charter and authorization: September 1, 1745; 10-year charter and full funding: November 30, 1745
- Founder: Gustaaf Willem van Imhoff; Jacob Mossel
- Defunct: March 15, 1794
- Successor: Amfioen Directie; Cultivation system; Opiumregie
- Headquarters: Batavia, Java
- Key people: Pieter van de Velde

The Amfioensociëteit, also known as the Amfioen Society, Amphioen Society, Opium Society (incorrectly translated as Amphibian Society), or more formally the Society for the Trade in Amfioen, was a Dutch colonial empire publicly traded joint-stock company designed to maintain a legal monopoly over amfioen (an archaic name specifically for raw opium, borrowed from the Portuguese language) in territories held and/or operated by the Dutch East India Company (VOC). The Dutch definition of the "East Indies" at this time included all lands between the Cape of Good Hope and the Pacific Ocean – mainly those lands bordering or inside what the Dutch referred to as the Indian Ocean.

While the Society was technically independent, the majority of the stocks were held by members of and those loyal to the VOC, leading some historians to declare the Society to be "a company within a company," while at the same time not legally considered a subsidiary. The Society and its monopoly over opium aided the VOC in their efforts to control and subjugate the populations of Java and its neighboring islands in the years before the creation of the Batavian Republic in Europe. From the VOC port city of Batavia, Java, opium was introduced and distributed into new markets in other areas of Java, Sumatra, Borneo, the Malay Peninsula, and other areas of the archipelago that is today called Indonesia.

Although the Society controlled the official distribution of the drug, a significant amount of contraband smuggling by VOC employees existed, leading to fluctuations in the supply and price. Despite this, the shareholders amassed large fortunes. The charter of the Society – initially issued in 1745 as a 5-year charter and quickly re-issued as a 10-year charter – was renewed several times until 1794, when it was dismantled by the VOC. The Society was replaced by a true subsidiary company of the VOC called the Amfioen Directie, which was in operation for another decade, surviving the initial dismantling of the VOC and the establishment of the Dutch East Indies, until it too was dismantled in the year 1808.

== Environment before the creation of the Society (1628–1745) ==
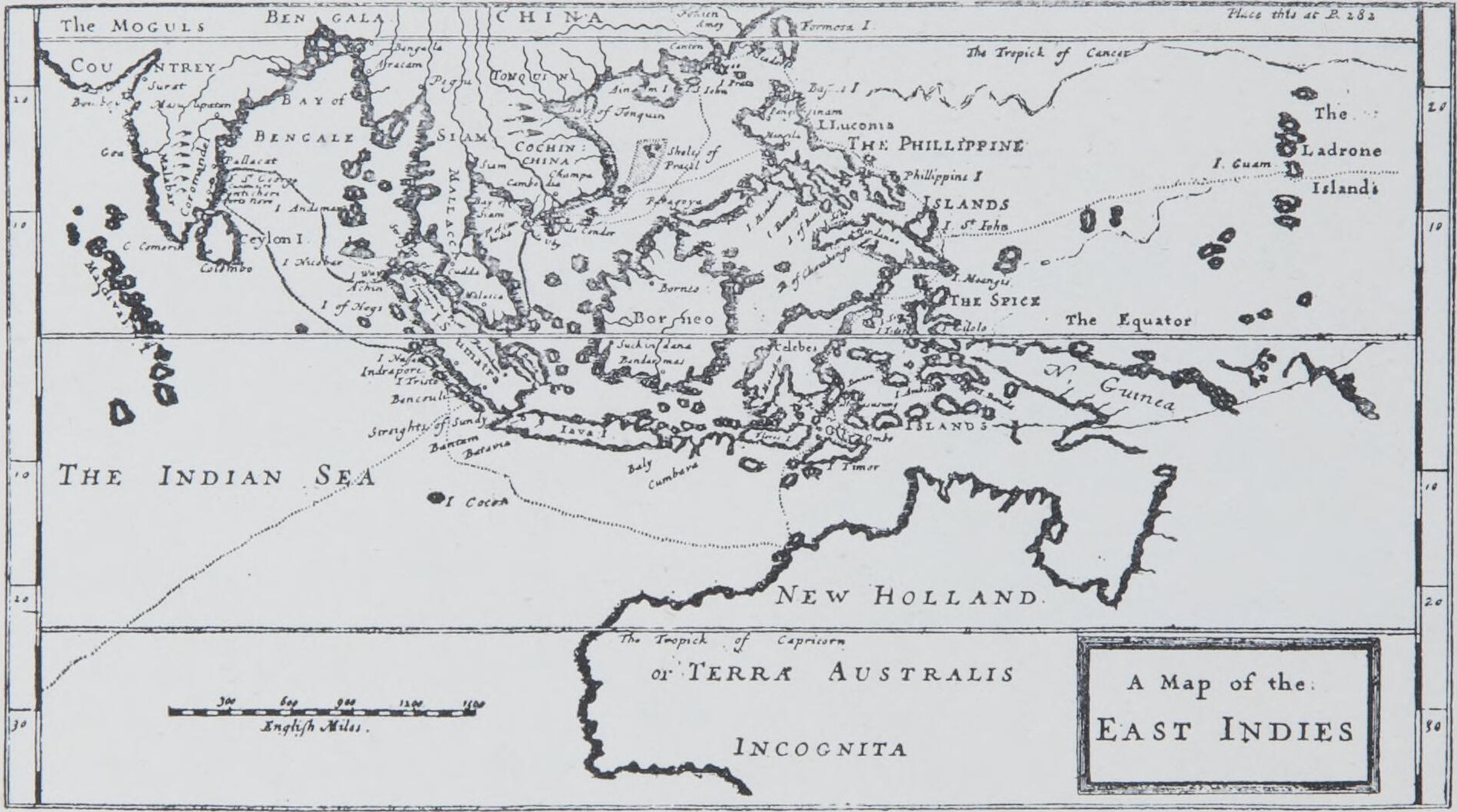
Map of the East Indies from Dampier's journal, 1700

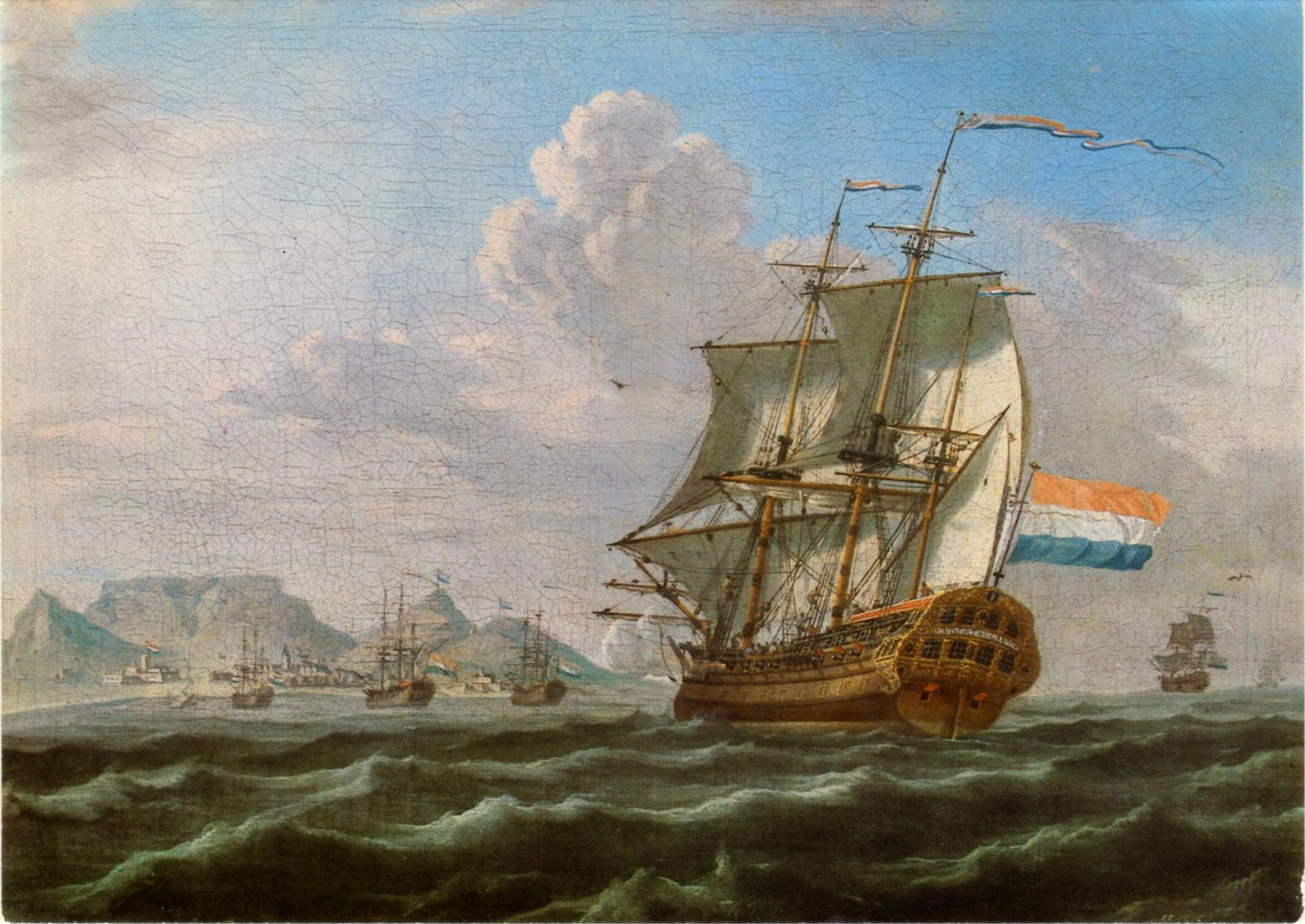
VOC ships at Table Bay in 1762. Dutch ships sailing between Amsterdam and Batavia usually stopped somewhere in the Dutch Cape Colony.

The early history of European-controlled opium markets in Southeast Asia goes back to the year 1511, when the Portuguese Empire took possession of Malacca. In these times, the local Muslim rulers and Sultans of the East Indies had differing opinions on opium, some driven by strict Sharia frameworks, and some driven by other interpretations of narcotics enforcement found in Koranic suras. The Javanese General Kei Aria Monjarja, for example, is recorded as having cut off the hands of a subject whom he found to have sold opium to European traders, before he banished the seller from Java altogether.

By 1628, however, the VOC and their established colonial quasi-government at Batavia – called the High Government – had established a taxation and tariff system on opium being brought into the island from mainland Asia. Beginning in the 1640s, the VOC began freight-carrying small shipments of several forms of opium, primarily amfioen, between Bengal and Batavia. At Batavia, this product was sold out of kannister chests in the local markets. On average, between 1640 and 1652, the VOC imported 500 lbs of opium annually into Batavia from Bengal. However, in the 1660s, the VOC engaged in a phase of the Dutch–Portuguese War which secured for them the former Portuguese strongholds along the Malabar Coast, especially the area of Cochin by 1663. By 1666, the opium imported to Java had risen to 10,000 lbs. It was around this time that the VOC began to observe the effects of an increasing opium addiction within their trading ports, and especially in Batavia, but they continued their push regardless. By 1670, the denizens of Batavia started mixing amfioen with tobacco to create tjandoe, the local name for this blended smoking opium. The VOC had managed to create such a demand for opium in Java that imports of opium by 1677 were not only coming from Bengal, but a few shipments were being imported from Persia and the Middle East. They also distributed Bihar-grown opium to the recently conquered areas of Malabar, where they pushed the substance onto the population in exchange for Malabar pepper.

Opium, at this point, became the single-most important product traded by the VOC, despite the fact that it was outdone in profits by spices produced in the Moluccan region. The importance of opium here was not in the sheer profit, but in the ability for the VOC to carve-out territory for itself by addicting even a minority of the local populations to the substance and bankrupting local monarchs. Throughout the 1670s, the VOC secured contracts with local regional governments and vassal states as the sole opium supplier within their territories. In 1677, the VOC secured distribution privileges from the Mataram Sultanate. In that year, they held an auction at the markets of Batavia, and the highest bidder received the legally-recognized monopoly over importation into Mataram. In 1678, the VOC also secured privileges from Cheribon and the Palembang Sultanate. The VOC often used violent tactics, coercion, and warfare to eliminate rival suppliers of opium in the region. By the end of the 17th century, the VOC had maneuvered around its rivals to become the dominant trade monopoly over opium in the whole of Southeast Asia.

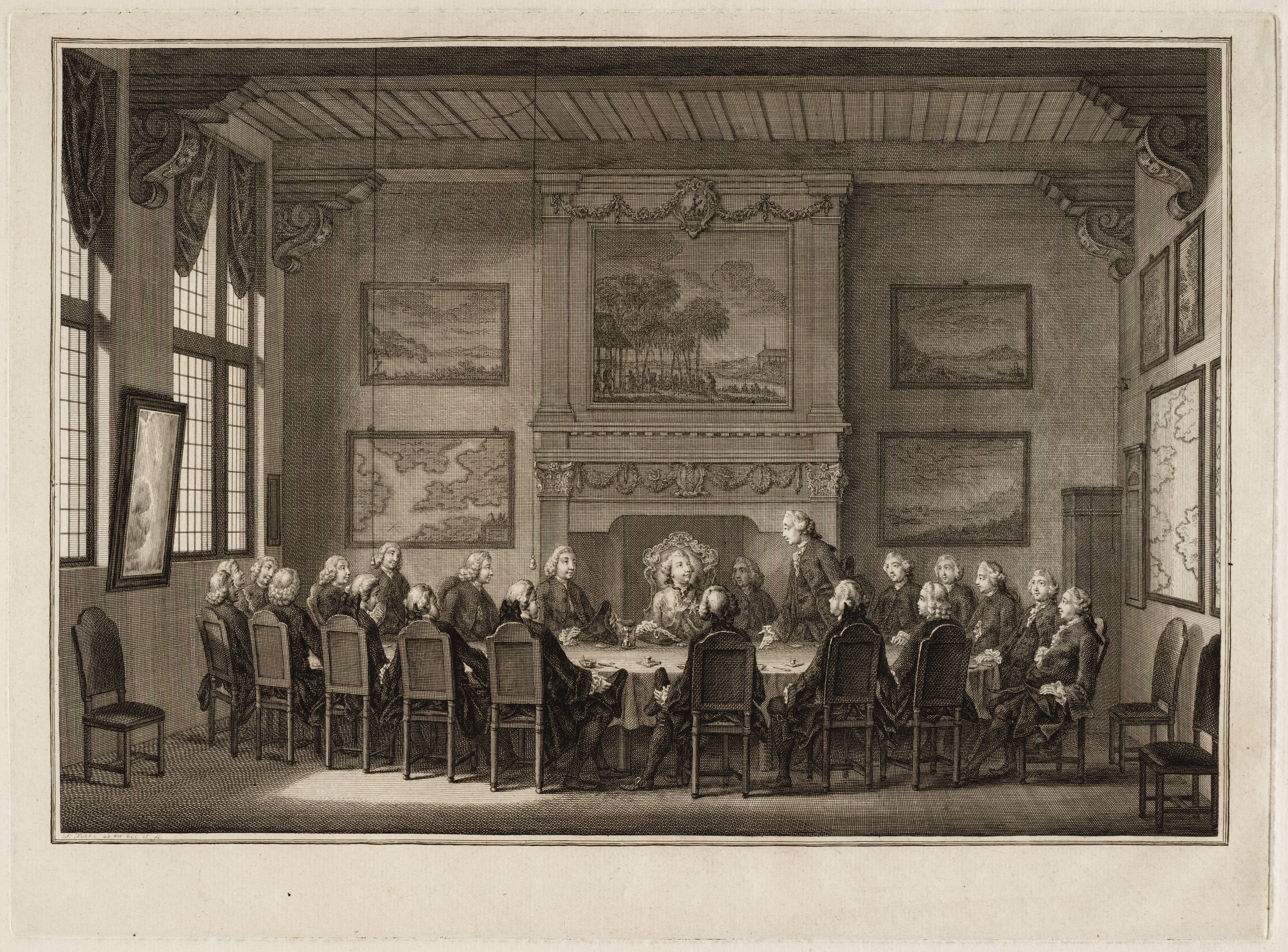
The Gentlemen Seventeen, in the Directors' Room at the East India House, Amsterdam.

Despite the fact that the VOC required its employees to obtain permission from the Company to buy and sell opium, privateers and other employees of the VOC had begun to establish their own large opium black market, or morshandel, considered an illegal and contraband smuggling market by the VOC. In the 18th century, this expanding black market became an increasing concern for the Gentlemen Seventeen, who desired a method to maintain the superiority of their trade monopoly.

During the Dutch-Portuguese War, in 1641, the VOC had established their own colony of Dutch Malacca. Chinese middlemen had been selling opium in the region, but as the markets in the Straits of Malacca were opened to English and Indian merchants, private Dutch colonial citizens – called "Free Burghers" – began purchasing wholesale products there and redistributing them into Batavia. In 1738, the private opium markets in the Straits began experiencing a major increase in trade. In 1743, the VOC's High Government in Batavia sent a special commission to Malacca to investigate the former Governor Rogier de Laver's alleged corruption and involvement in black market opium. Included in this investigation were the allegations against his harbormaster and court prosecutor. This investigation discovered the extent of the smuggling problem in Malacca.

However, fluctuations in price were also caused by externalities outside of any person's control: opium farms, like all other farms, were victims of the weather. Any season that deviated from normal meteorological conditions optimal for growing meant as much instability in prediction on profits as any other farmed crops in the region. Opium ships were also vulnerable at sea to monsoons and other storms, but historians are still researching these meteorological effects on the market.

== Massacre of the Chinese at Batavia (1740) ==
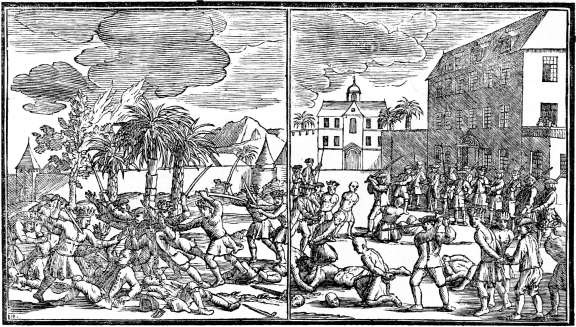
A depiction of the 1740 Batavia massacre, in which Chinese citizens of the city were killed by VOC forces

Aside from the Dutch smuggling, another problem for the VOC was noted in the Chinese merchant class who had secured privileges from the VOC to retail the product. It was "discovered" that they were keeping chests of opium in warehouses to create deliberate shortages in the market to increase the profits from their own sales, causing the VOC to lose certain percentages in revenue, because the VOC was paying for the costs of the warehouses.

In 1738, Chinese sugar planters in Batavia responded to a severe decline in sugar prices set by the VOC by petitioning the Council of the Indies to restore rates to earlier levels. As part of their proposal, they offered to increase purchases of opium, textiles, and other Company goods. The petition was rejected.

By 1740, worsening conditions in the sugar economy left many Chinese laborers destitute and classified by the Company as illegal immigrants. That year, they launched an armed revolt, seizing plantations, fortifying them, and laying siege to Batavia. The uprising "prompted" the VOC to carry out mass killings of the city's Chinese population.

VOC espionage reports from the time describe how Chinese rebel-held plantations were reorganized. Plantation leaders assumed command roles, food supplies were rationed, and opium in the form of madat was sold in small stalls together with basic goods such as tobacco, salt, and dried fish. Later, in the 1790s, The Chinese Annals of Batavia, an anonymously authored account, offered a moral critique of opium use, portraying it as a destructive habit that worsened social and economic decline prior to the massacre.

The decades following this massacre transformed the Dutch view of the opium trade as a commodity into somewhat of a racially motivated evil. Many of the VOC superiors associated the opium habit specifically with the Chinese class, being in their view dirty and dangerous.

By violently reducing the role of Chinese entrepreneurs, this genocide opened opportunities for European officials to expand into sectors previously dominated by Chinese planters and traders. After the exile of the Chinese community leader Ni Hoekong to Ambon, his sugar estates in Bekasi were auctioned in 1742 and purchased by the Dutch official Pieter van de Velde. The acquisition, which included two parcels of land and four sugar mills, allowed van den Velde to establish himself in both sugar and opium-related commerce. By the time of his death in 1759, he had built his holdings into nine sugar plantations.

== Rise and creation of the Society (1741–1745) ==
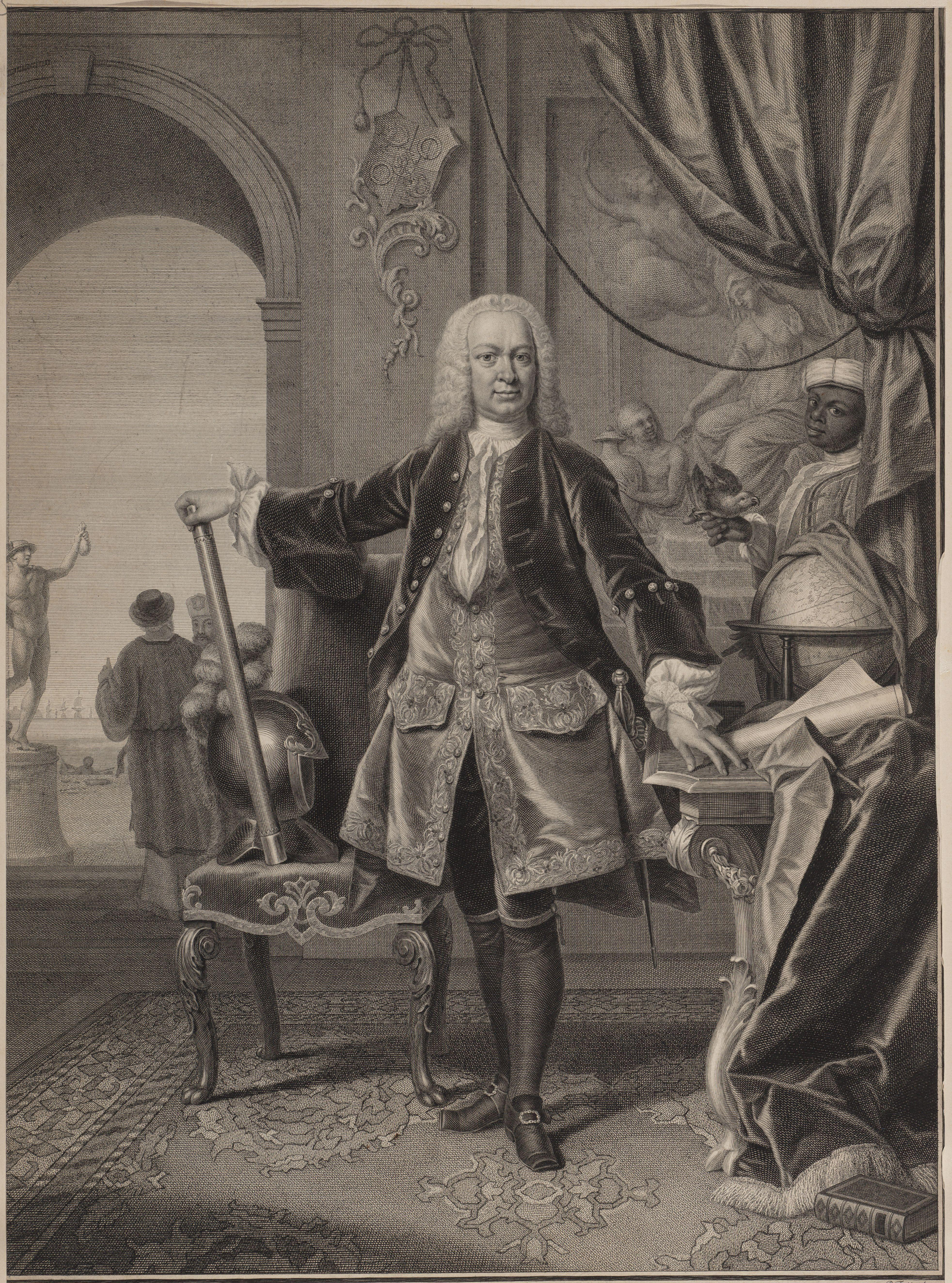
Governor General Van Imhoff, largely credited as the creator of the Society. He considered himself a reformer.

It was in this era, the middle of the 18th century, that the VOC and the High Government began seriously deliberating about different solutions to the smuggling problem. Smugglers, primarily Free Burgher denizens of Batavia and Malacca, had created large markets throughout the archipelago. However, the main reason for these discussions was that Batavia itself was going through a major economic decline; houses were at risk of foreclosure, various trading companies were at risk of bankruptcy. Several members of the High Government and other employees of the VOC suggested the full legalization of the existing private opium market, and that a free trade would bring prosperity to the colony. Some historians, however, suggest that the VOC was merely scapegoating these smugglers due to the VOC's own ineptitude and mismanagement of the market. The historian J. F. Scheltema suggests that the VOC caught itself in a vicious circle of market debt, and was desperately searching for an escape valve.

The opium market itself was also not predictable, having to cope with fluctuating prices. Because the retail vendors whom the VOC had been selling to also kept their opium in warehouses for extended periods of time, it meant that the VOC could not sell more wholesale amfioen until warehouse space was available.

The Governor General of Batavia by 1743 was Gustaaf Willem van Imhoff. Van Imhoff thought of himself as a reformist, seeking ways to improve the quality of life for the Free Burghers of the colony. During his tenure, he opened schools, established an official post office, a new hospital, and also developed a colonial newspaper.

As early as 1741, the year after the Batavia massacre, Van Imhoff had already traveled to the East India House, the VOC headquarters in Amsterdam, and had approached the Gentlemen Seventeen for permission to curtail Batavia's economic position through a new legalized monopoly over the opium trade. The Gentlemen Seventeen at this time, however, were not entirely keen on seeing their market share drop to a percentage of what had been supposedly their dominion.

Van Imhoff was a proponent of legalizing the private market, but not entirely at the scale of free market. He did want to breed a healthy competitive atmosphere, but he also wanted to create a system of more effective centralized control. Van Imhoff's suggestion was a new monopoly over the opium trade, apart from the VOC, but in a working relationship with that company.

On September 24, 1745, Van Imhoff took it upon his own initiative and held a meeting with the Council of the Indies in Batavia in which he presented his plans for the new Society. He argued that the Amfioensociëteit would be a guaranteed source of income for the VOC, that any investors would have a guarantee of safety and returns on their investments, and the colony of Batavia would prosper from the arrangement. His argument was successful, and the High Government granted their approval for the Society. The initial Charter, which was certified for a period of 5 years, was pro-dated to the 1st of September, which is officially the birth of the Society.

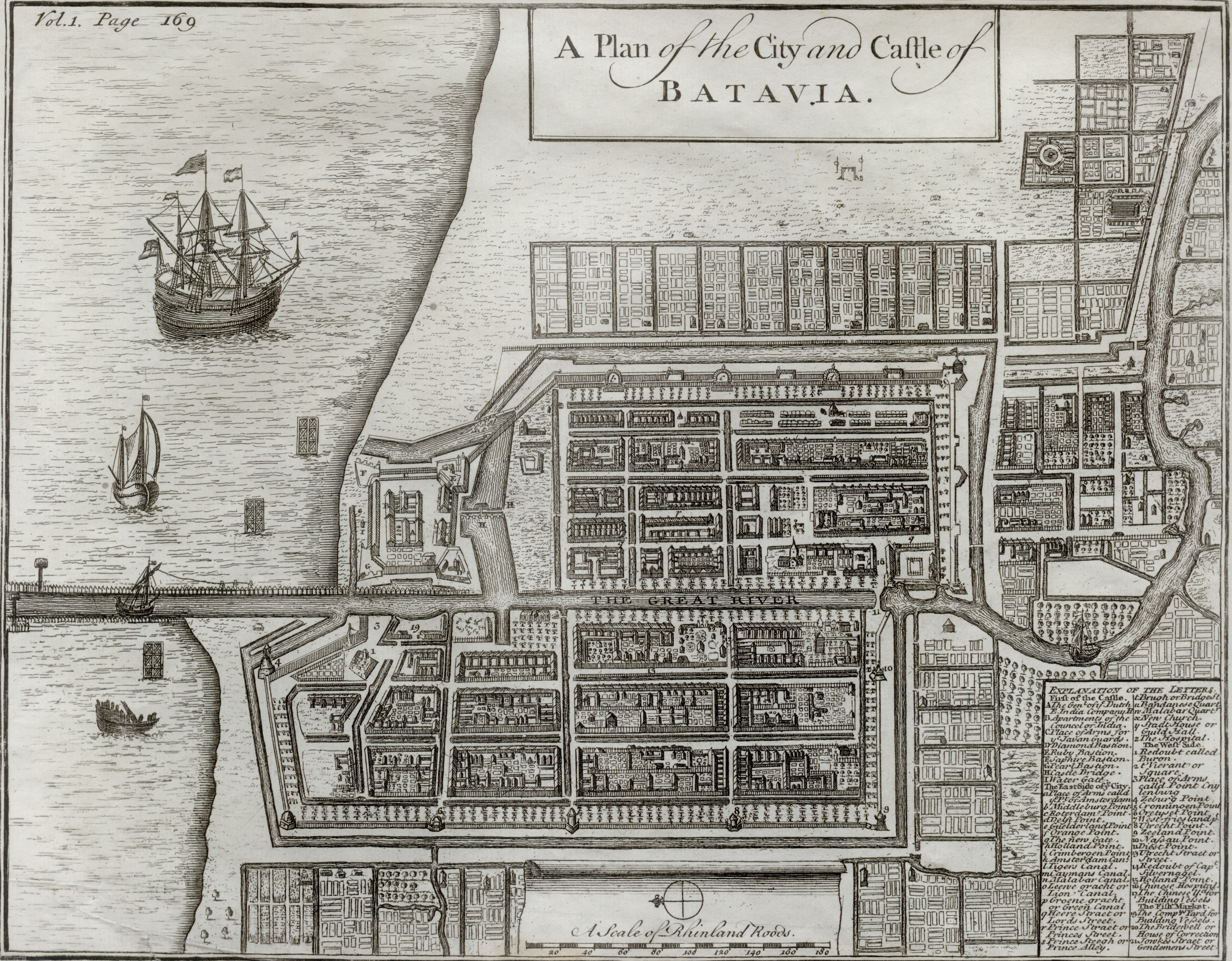
A plan of the city and castle of Batavia from 1746 (now called Jakarta)

Over the next two months, they went on a fundraising mission to sell the initial shares. Shares officially went for sale on October 1, 1745. Within several weeks, the Society raised its initial capital by issuing 300 shares, valued at 2000 rixdollars each, which were purchased mainly by senior officials of the VOC. These shareholders were drawn from the highest ranking VOC officials in Southeast Asia at the time. The core of the Society's shareholders, and especially its initial investors, were drawn from the most elite captains and salesmen of the smuggling market. In including those senior smugglers as owners of the new legalized monopoly, the Society absorbed most of their networks and trade alliances virtually overnight. Not all of the shareholders, however, had been involved in the illegal market, and not all of the smugglers were brought into the Society.

On November 30, 1745, the new Society was fully established and headquartered in Batavia, and the charter was re-issued for a full 10 years. The articles of confederation were written at this time as well. These two documents gave the Society exclusive rights to acquire the VOC's opium stock for resale. Under the charter, the Society was required to "purchase" from the Company at least 1,200 chests of amfioen each year at a fixed rate of 450 rix-dollars per chest, with additional quantities carried in bulk available at discounted prices under a sliding predetermined scale. A "chest" was then legally defined as weighing 145 Dutch ponden (roughly 158 pounds, or 72 kilograms). This arrangement guaranteed the VOC a steady annual sale of opium, though in practice the Society sometimes bought less than the stipulated amount.

== History of the Society (1745–1794) ==
The leadership of the Society, as defined in the articles of confederation, were as follows;

- One chief executive officer, being the Governor General
- One 5-man committee, meeting on a regular basis, including;
  - One director of the Society
  - Two principal Batavian shareholders
  - One cashier
  - One secretary and bookkeeper

In addition to the Committee, the Society's principal shareholders were scheduled to meet on a monthly basis, but often met multiple times in a month. Van Imhoff and the director also attended these meetings.

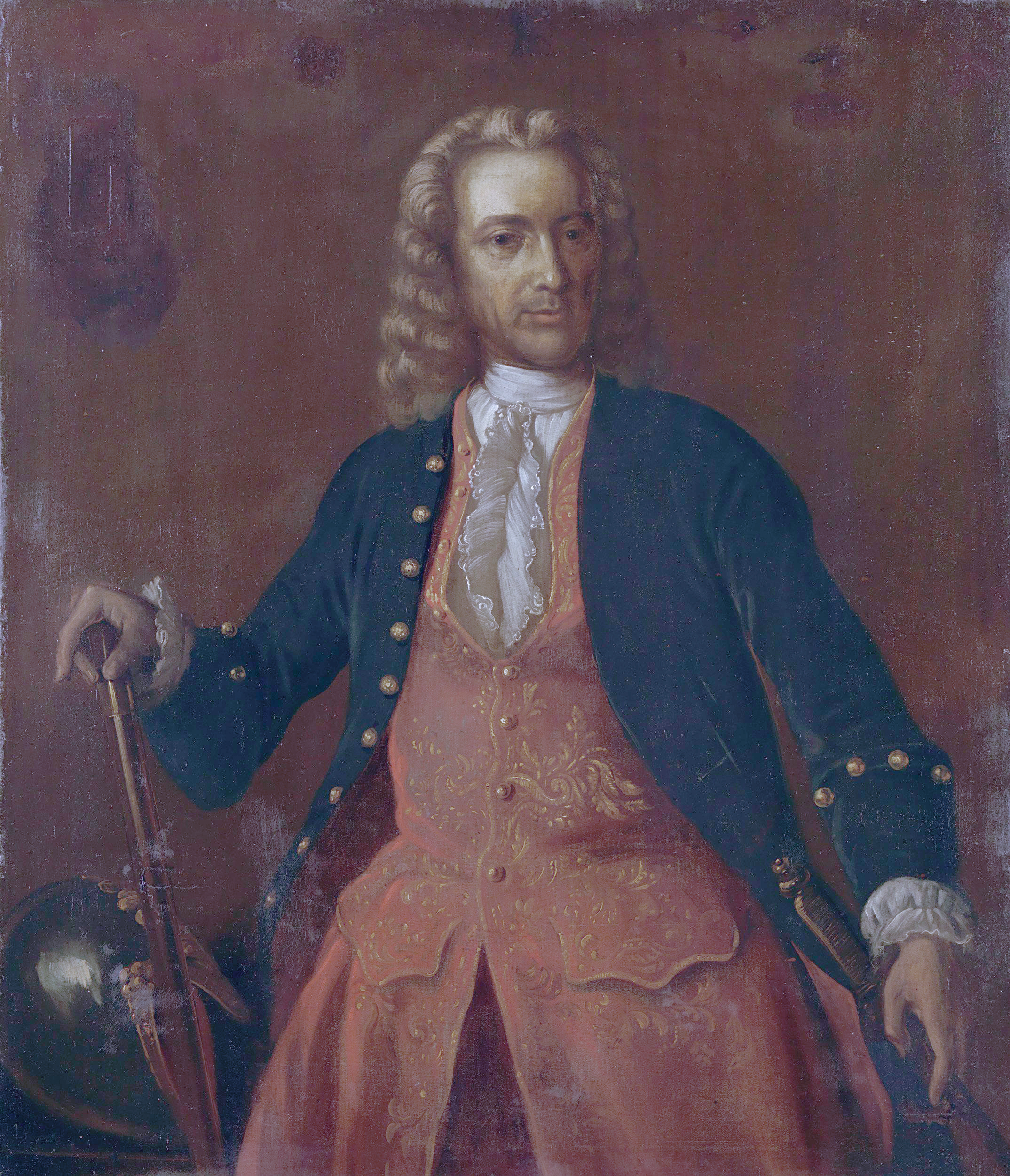
Jacob Mossel was the first Director of the Society before becoming the Governor General of Batavia. He also held the largest individual stake in the Society.

The first director of the Society was Jacob Mossel, who was also instrumental in fundraising the initial shares. He also held the largest individual stake of the company, at 40 shares. Mossel served as director from 1745 to 1750. Mossel was, like most of the shareholders of the Society, also involved in other commodities for the VOC, but especially was involved in the sugar trade. In the same year that Mossel assumed the position of director, Mossel entered into the ownership of a sugar plantation with a man named Pieter van de Velde, where four sugar mills were authorized. Over the following years, Mossel's sugar empire expanded to include at least seven plantations in Tangerang by the time of his death in 1761.

In 1750, when Mosel was advanced to the position of Governor General of Batavia, taking over from Van Imhoff, Pieter van de Velde became the 2nd director of the Society. Van de Velde served from 1753 to 1759.

Despite the fact that Section 40 of the Articles of Confederation authorized the Society to engage in any necessary naval conflict and equip armed vessels, they mostly relied upon the VOC to wage their wars. The profits of the shareholders were considerable, while the VOC absorbed the military expenditures and engaged in the necessary expeditionary campaigns to protect the trade. The VOC also carried the expenses of transporting chests of opium to Semarang, Surabaya, Makassar, and other colonial ports in the archipelago.

Within six months of its establishment, the Society had sold 708 chests of opium. By the fifth year, annual purchases had risen to around 1,800 chests, with net profits estimated at 150,000 rix-dollars per year. During the first 15 years of the Society's operations, opium was more profitable for the VOC than it had ever been when they were in complete control. The VOC was taking between 400 and 500 guilders for every chest of opium sold by the Society, and the product eventually amounted to 40% of the VOC's overall trade.

The Society's shareholders also gained huge profits from the trade in these years. Their dividends in the initial years were at 6 million guilders, at least 366% ROI.

In 1748, William IV, Prince of Orange, acquired thirty shares. Whenever the charter was renewed, William, and later his successor William V, Prince of Orange, would receive huge payouts of at least 200,000 guilders. In 1795, they received a payout of 1,187,280 guilders.

However, none of the shareholders are recorded as being retailers of the product in the region. Three-fifths of the retailing merchant class in the opium trade of the region at this time were Chinese. The Society was not concerned with the sales of retail opium, it only desired control of the monopoly over amfioen: wholesale, raw opium.

The commercial divisions in Batavia were not entirely rigid, and access to the opium trade was not restricted solely to VOC officials or members of the colonial elite. Records of purchasers from the Society show that participants represented a broader and more diverse commercial community. Buyers included both wealthy merchants with established interests in the trade and smaller traders seeking opportunities to profit from opium.

The majority of purchasers were of Chinese origin, including Peranakans, but purchasers were also found in European, Armenian, Javanese, Malay, South Asian, and other various Muslim traders. Although men were the dominant participants, women were not excluded. Purchase records note the involvement of Chinese widows and Balinese women, whose presence, while limited, indicates that female actors also engaged in the opium trade.

Amfioen could be paid for using cash, gold, silver, coins, or jewels, but could also be paid through a unique system of credit called the obligaties system, or obligatien. These were much like the system of modern cash, being promissory notes or debenture bonds to be paid back within four months and subject to interest rates. Before obligaties could be purchased, the buyers were required to pass through an aanvraag, which was the equivalent to a modern credit check. In the Society registers were included information about a buyer, to include their ethnic or religious marker, occupation, and any references to their social position. Documents for sale also included a signature of the buyers, guarantors, Society officials, and any witnesses to the sale. This system benefited local merchants, retailers, and the society by avoiding many of the immediate effects of market fluctuations in the price of opium, specifically as a result of the four-month repayment period. This credit system leads some economic historians to suggest that the Society should also be considered a sort of central bank, placed alongside other Batavian banks such as the Bank Courant en Bank van Lening, and the Weeskamer.

These credit sales constituted the largest volumes and values of opium sold by the Society. In 1780, as a result of Dutch involvement in the American Revolutionary War, Britain declared war on Holland, sparking the Fourth Anglo-Dutch War. Combined with the concurrent First Anglo-Maratha War, the conflict led opium being imported from the Indian coast and Bengal to suffer major fluctuations in price and volume. However, sales did ultimately recover at the conclusion of hostilities in 1783.

== Dissolution and establishment of the Amfioen Directie ==
Despite Van Imhoff's guarantee to the High Government that the Society would create better economic conditions for the colony at Batavia, this did not occur. Most of the financial gains were held by senior officials of the VOC and their descendants, rather than the colonial community in Batavia. By 1769, 172 of the 300 shares in the society were already held outside the Netherlands Indies. This number increased to 230 by the end of 1789, and in 1801, despite the society being in the process of liquidation, only 56 shares remained in Batavia. As a result, local Free Burghers received little benefit from dividend distributions, completely undermining the society's stated purpose of serving the colony's interests.

Also, despite the arrangement of the charter, an illicit market still remained. The trade in opium, and the VOC itself, was then considered far less profitable for the Dutch, and in its place rose a new Dutch company which would battle with the British over the supremacy of tea. The locus of Dutch power in Asia for a time was shifted from Batavia to Canton.

At the request of the Gentlemen Seventeen, the Society was examined first by a preparatory committee and later by a high-level commission. In a report submitted to the Gentlemen Seventeen on 15 January 1795, VOC commissioners Nederburgh and Frijkenius noted that steps had already been taken to dissolve the society. They explained that the text of a proclamation had been forwarded to the High Government on 15 March 1794, and that on the same day the society was officially declared dissolved. Following its dissolution, the administration of the former Society was placed under the oversight of a special directorate of amfioen called the Amfioen Directie.
