= General Hartley =

General Hartley may refer to:

- Alan Hartley (1882–1954), British Indian Army general
- Harold Hartley (chemist) (1878–1972), British Army brigadier general
- James Hartley (East India Company officer) (1745–1799), East India Company major general
- John Hartley (general) (born 1943), Australian Army major general
