= Katavi =

Katavi may refer to:

- Katavi, Mawal, Pune district, Maharashtra, India
- Katavi Region, Tanzania
- Katavi National Park, Tanzania
