= Pieter van de Velde =

Member of the High Government of Batavia, Java
- In office 1744–1759

2nd Director of the Amfioen Society
- In office 1750–1759
- Preceded by: Jacob Mossel

First Regent of Hospitals for the Dutch East India Company
- In office 1745–1759

Personal details
- Born: Somewhere in the East Indies or Amersfort
- Died: August 7, 1759 Batavia, Java
- Spouse: Clasina Helena Goop k Groen
- Children: Bartholo meus Gerard; Sara Jacoba
- Parents: Bartholomeus van den Velde; Aletta van der Lingen

Pieter van de Velde (some archaic Dutch uses "den Velde," and other documents use "der Velde") was a member of the High Government of the colony of the Dutch colonial empire colony at Batavia, Java during the reign of the Dutch East India Company (VOC). He was a sugar and opium magnate, who also acted as the 2nd serving Director of the Amfioensociëteit. As such, he became one of the richest people on the planet, alongside his peer Jacob Mossel, of whom he was in partnership in the sugar and opium business. He is noted in Dutch documents as being an inlander, or a native of the East Indies. His father, however, was Bartholomeus van den Velde, the mayor of Amersfoort. At a young age, he served as a clerk for the VOC, and he rose through the ranks of the company to high status. In 1742, shortly after the Batavia massacre, Van de Velde purchased from auction the repossessed farmlands and plantation of the former Chinese community leader and Kapitein der Chinezen General Ni Hoekong, who had been exiled from Java. In 1756, he had a villa constructed here, which was called Tandjong Oost. In 1744, he was made a Commissioner and Heemraad. The following year, he was made Chief Merchant of Batavia. Around the same time, he became one of the chief shareholders of the Amfioensociëteit.
