= Treaty of Surat =

1775 treaty between Great Britain and the Maratha Empire

The Treaty of Surat (6 March 1775) was a treaty by which Raghunathrao, one of the claimants to the throne of the Peshwa, agreed to cede Salsette and Bassein Fort to the British in consideration of being himself restored to Poona. The military operations that followed are known as the First Anglo-Maratha War.

Warren Hastings, who in his capacity of Governor General claimed a right of control over the decisions of the Bombay Government, annulled the Treaty of Surat and sent his own agent to negotiate a very different new pact, the Treaty of Purandhar (1776) in which Ragoji offered help to the British in exchange for becoming king of Maratha.
