= Treaty of Salbai =

1782 treaty between the Maratha Empire and the East India Company

Coordinates: 25°51′N 78°19′E

- Context: First Anglo-Maratha War
- Signed: 17 May 1782
- Location: Gwalior
- Signatories: Mahadji Shinde; Warren Hastings
- Parties: Maratha Confederacy; East India Company
- Languages: English, Marathi

Full text
- Treaty of Salbai at Wikisource

The Treaty of Salbai was signed on 17 May 1782, by representatives of the Maratha Confederacy and the British East India Company after long negotiations to settle the outcome of the First Anglo-Maratha War it was signed between Warren Hastings and Mahadaji Shinde. Under its terms, the Company retained control of Salsette and Broach and acquired guarantees that the Marathas would defeat Hyder Ali of Mysore and retake territories in the Carnatic. The Marathas also guaranteed that the French would be prohibited from establishing settlements on their territories. In return, the British agreed to pension off their protégé, Raghunath Rao, and acknowledge Madhavrao II as peshwa of the Maratha Empire. The British also recognised the territorial claims of the Mahadji Shinde west of the Jumna River and all the territories occupied by the British after the Treaty of Purandar were given back to the Marathas. Haider Ali was required to restore all the territories he had seized from the English and the Nawab of Arcot. The Peshwa was prohibited from offering support to any European power and was required to ensure that the English retained their prior trading privileges. Mahadji Scindia was designated as the mutual guarantor, responsible for overseeing the treaty's proper implementation.

The Treaty of Salbai resulted in a period of relative peace between the Maratha Confederacy and the British East India Company until outbreak of the Second Anglo-Maratha War in 1802. David Anderson concluded the Treaty of Salbai on behalf of the East India Company. The treaty of peace between the two parties lasted for 20 years until the Second Anglo-Maratha War.

== Analysis ==
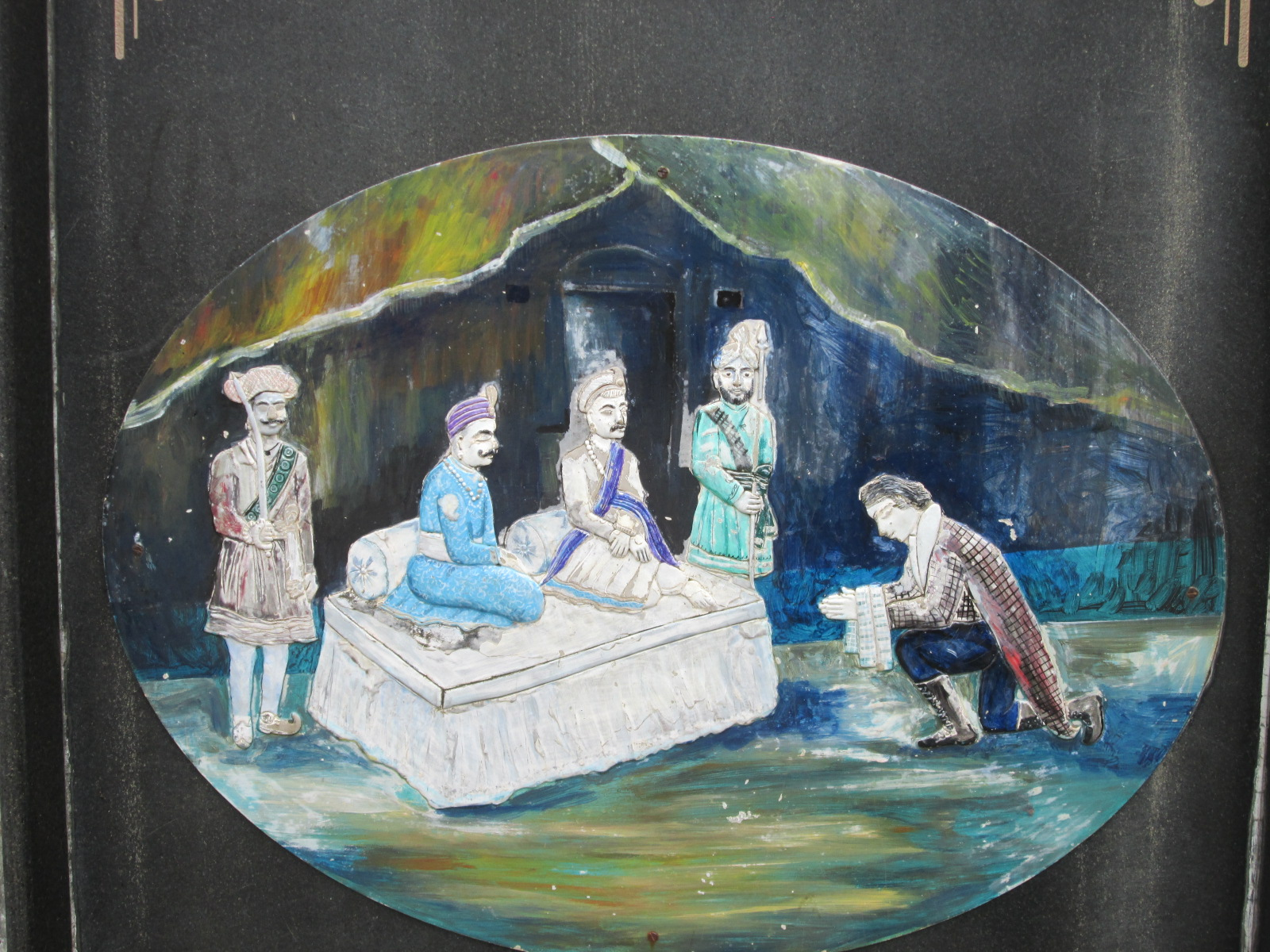
Mural depicting a British officer surrendering to Mahadaji Shinde and Nana Fadnavis following the Battle of Wadgaon

The treaty brought a 20-year peace between Marathas and British, but in the long term it was a blunder by the Marathas. The British did not get any substantial territorial gains, war indemnities promised by Marathas in 1776 were written off, and they gave up backing Raghunath Rao and recognized Madhavrao II. But in the long run the diplomacy paid off for the British. Hastings managed to break off the Triple Alliance of Marathas, Mysore and Nizam through this treaty. At a time when its resources were drained, administrative challenges from London mounted, and no aid from London forthcoming due to Britain's engagement with the American War of Independence, East India Company, against all odds, succeeded in securing peace. The last chance for the Indian powers to eradicate the British power in India was lost with this treaty. Eager to assert his leadership over the Maratha Confederacy, avoid further conflict and become a British ally, Mahadji Scindia independently brokered the treaty in a small village called Salbai near Gwalior, despite the Peshwa's camp, led by Nana Fadnavis, expressing reservations. Nana Fadnavis hesitated because the British Bombay Council had previously undermined the Treaty of Purandar (1776) by sheltering Raghunathrao. In retaliation, he explicitly violated the above treaty by granting the French a port on the west coast. He had originally negotiated the Treaty of Purandar with the British Calcutta Council under Hastings, ensuring Raghunathrao was marginalized and pensioned off. Despite all these previous grievances, he had to ratify the Treaty of Salbai on the behalf of Peshwa in 1783, after a one year delay, with Mahadji as the mediator. The treaty isolated Mysore, which allowed the British to neutralize the major South Indian player before finally dealing with the Marathas after 20 years. The treaty weakened Maratha unity, providing the British with further grounds to intervene in future political maneuvering and conflicts, enabling them to engage with individual Maratha chiefs separately.

== Sources ==
- Olson, James Stuart and Shadle, Robert. Historical Dictionary of the British Empire. Greenwood Press, 1996. ISBN 0-313-27917-9
