= First Anglo-Maratha War =

Part of Anglo-Maratha Wars between 1775 and 1818

- Part of the Anglo-Maratha Wars
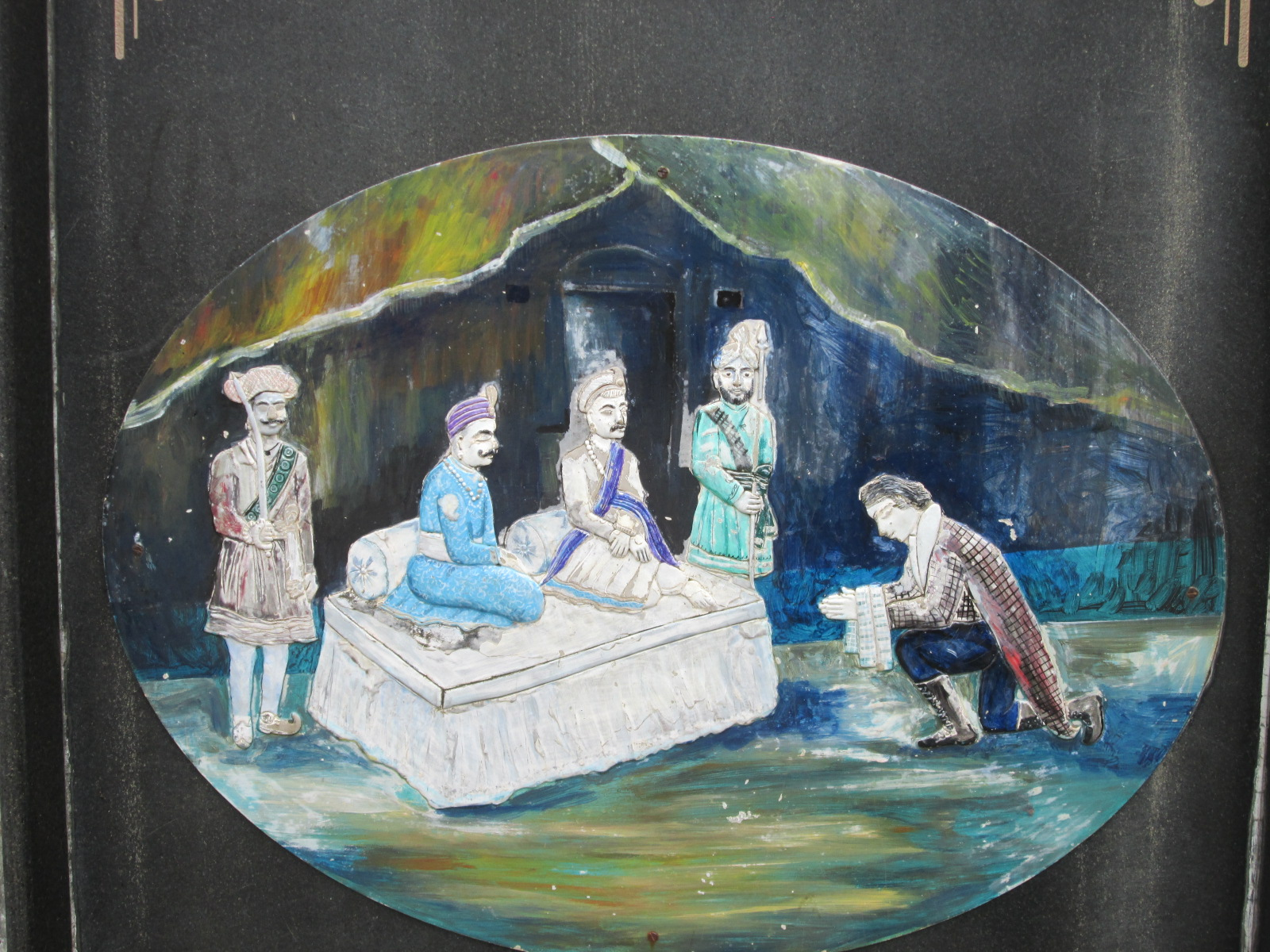
- Mural depicting a British officer surrendering to Mahadaji Shinde and Nana Fadnavis following the Battle of Wadgaon
| Date | 15 March 1775 – 17 May 1782 (7 years, 2 months and 2 days) |
| Location | Central India; Western India |
| Result | Inconclusive: Status quo ante bellum; Treaty of Salbai |

Belligerents
| Great Britain: East India Company | Maratha Empire: Indore State; Gwalior State |

Commanders and leaders
| Warren Hastings; Colonel Keating; Thomas Wyndham Goddard; Raghunathrao | Madhavrao II; Nana Fadnavis; Hari Pant; Mahadaji Shinde; Tukoji Holkar |

Strength
| 93,000 troops total 23 ships | Around 146,000 troops total 14 ships |

The First Anglo-Maratha War (1775–1782) was the first conflict fought between the British East India Company and Maratha Empire in India. The war, fought in between Surat and Poona, began with the 1775 Treaty of Surat after the East India Company agreed to support the recently deposed Raghunathrao's claim as Peshwa of the Maratha Empire. Several years of intermittent and largely inconclusive campaigning followed, in which the East India Company failed to decisively defeat the highly mobile Marathas. The war ended in 1782 following the Treaty of Salbai. As per the treaty, both sides returned each other's captured territory, and the British withdrew their support for Raghunathrao. The British and Marathas would not fight against each other again until the Second Anglo-Maratha War 20 years later.

== Background ==
After the death of Madhavrao Peshwa in 1772, his brother Narayanrao became peshwa (prime minister) of the Maratha Empire. Narayanrao's palace guards murdered him in August 1773, and his uncle Raghunathrao (Raghoba) became the Peshwa. However, Narayanrao's wife, Gangabai, gave birth to a posthumous son, who was the legal heir to the throne. The newborn infant was named 'Sawai' Madhavrao (Sawai means "One and a Quarter"). Twelve Maratha chiefs, known as the Baarbhai and led by Nana Phadnavis, directed an effort to install the infant as the new Peshwa and to rule in his name as regents.

Raghunathrao, unwilling to give up his position of power, sought help from the British at Bombay and signed the Treaty of Surat on 6 March 1775. According to the treaty, Raghunathrao ceded the territories of Salsette and Bassein (Vasai) to the British, along with part of the revenues from Surat and Bharuch districts. In return, the British promised to provide Raghunathrao with 2,500 soldiers.

At the same time, the Marathas tried to form a military alliance with the French. Two Frenchmen, Saint-Lubin and M. Montigny acted as intermediaries between France and the Poona Regency. Although the alliance proposals went nowhere, British suspicions of a global anti-British front increased in the midst of the concurrent American War of Independence.

The British Calcutta Council condemned the Treaty of Surat, sending Colonel Upton to Pune to annul it and make a new treaty with the regency. The Treaty of Purandhar (1 March 1776) annulled that of Surat, Raghunathrao was pensioned and his cause abandoned, but the revenues of Salsette and Bharuch districts were retained by the British. The Bombay government rejected this new treaty and gave refuge to Raghunathrao. In 1777, Nana Phadnavis violated his treaty with the Calcutta Council by granting the French a port on the West coast. The British retaliated by sending a force towards Pune.

== Initial stage and Treaty of Purandar (1774–1775) ==
British troops under the command of Colonel Keating, left Surat on 15 March 1775, for Pune. But they were checked by Haripant Phadke at Adas and were totally defeated on 18 May 1775. Casualties for Keating's force, accompanied by Raghunathrao, included 96 killed. The Marathas casualties in the Battle of Adas (Gujarat) included 150 killed.

Warren Hastings estimated that direct actions against Pune would be detrimental. Therefore, the Supreme Council of Bengal condemned the Treaty of Surat, sending Colonel Upton to Pune to annul it and make a new treaty with the regency. An agreement between Upton and the ministers of Pune called Treaty of Purandar was signed on 1 March 1776.

The Treaty of Purandar (or Treaty of Purandhar) was a doctrine signed on 1 March 1776 by the peshwa of the Maratha Empire and the British East India Company's Supreme Council of Bengal in Calcutta. Based on the terms of the accord, the British were able to secure Salsette. Treaty was signed between the then Governor General Warren Hasting who sent Colonel Upton and Nana Fadnavis of Peshwa in which British accepted Madhavrao as a new Peshwa and Maratha accepted not to recognise existence of French in India.

The Treaty of Purandhar (1 March 1776) annulled that of Surat, Raghunath Rao was pensioned and his cause abandoned, but the revenues of Salsette and Broach districts were retained by the British.

== Battle of Wadgaon ==
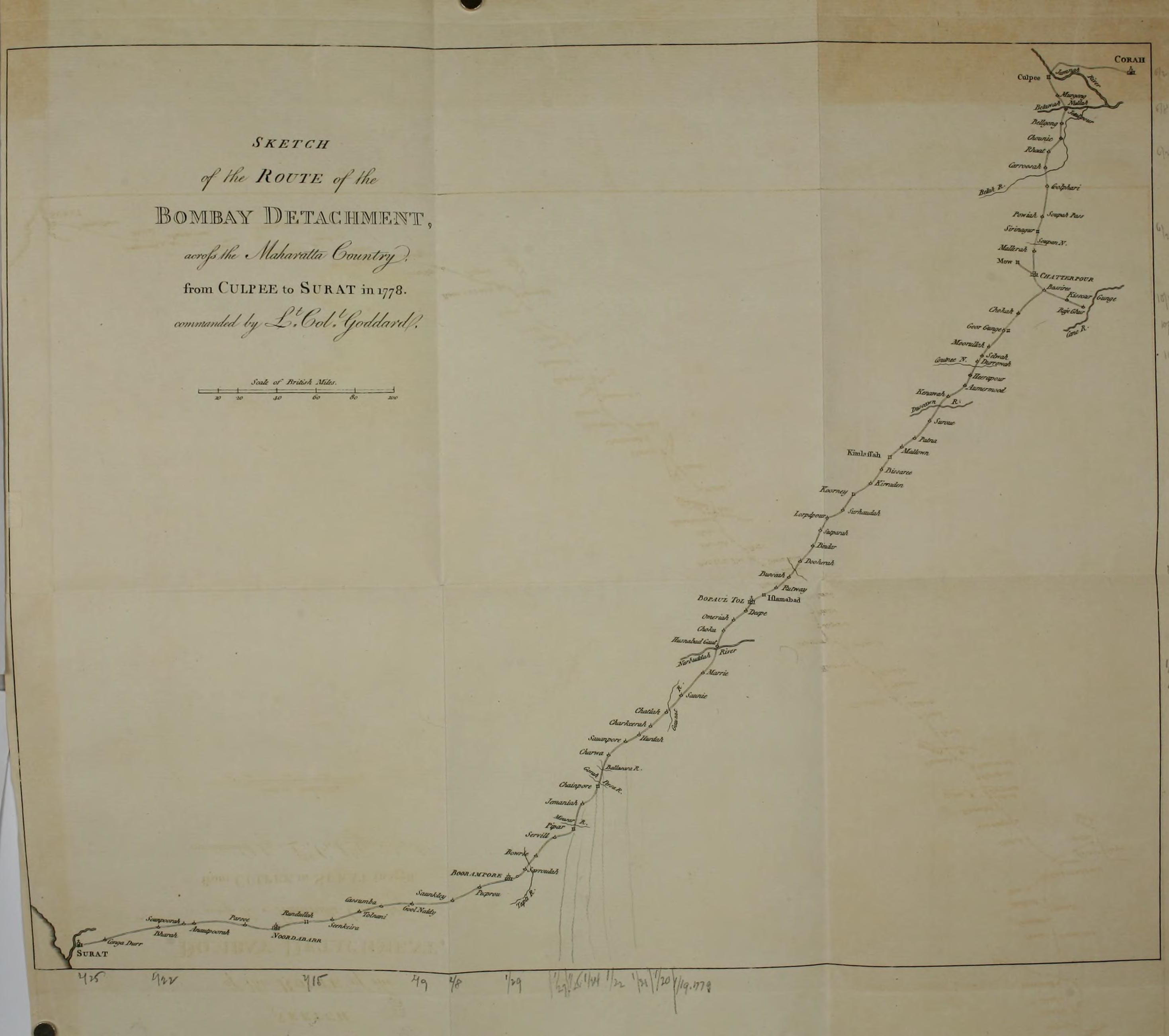
Route of the Bombay detachment across the Mahratta country from Culpee to Surat c. 1778.

Following a treaty between France and the Poona Government in 1776, the Bombay Government decided to invade and reinstate Raghoba. A force under Col. Egerton reached Khopoli and made its way through the Western Ghats at Bhor Ghat and onwards toward Karla, which was reached on 4 January 1779 while under Maratha attacks. Finally the British were forced to retreat back to Wadgaon, but were soon surrounded. The British surrendered and were forced to sign the Treaty of Wadgaon on 16 January 1779, a victory for the Marathas.

Reinforcements from northern India, commanded by Colonel (later General) Thomas Wyndham Goddard, arrived too late to save the Bombay force. The British Governor-General in Bengal, Warren Hastings, rejected the treaty on the grounds that the Bombay officials had no legal power to sign it, and ordered Goddard to secure British interests in the area.

Goddard with 6,000 troops stormed Bhadra Fort and captured Ahmedabad on 15 February 1779. There was a garrison of 6,000 Arab and Sindhi infantry and 2,000 horses. Losses in the fight totalled 108, including two British. Goddard also captured Bassein on 11 December 1780. Another Bengal detachment led by Captain Popham and assisted by the Rana of Gohad, captured Gwalior on 4 August 1780, before Mahadaji Shinde could make preparations. Skirmishes took place between Shinde and General Goddard in Gujarat, but indecisively. Hastings sent yet another force to harass Shinde, commanded by Major Camac. (Note: Camac (not to be confused with Carnac) received his promotion to Lieutenant-Colonel while on this mission)

== Central India and the Deccan ==
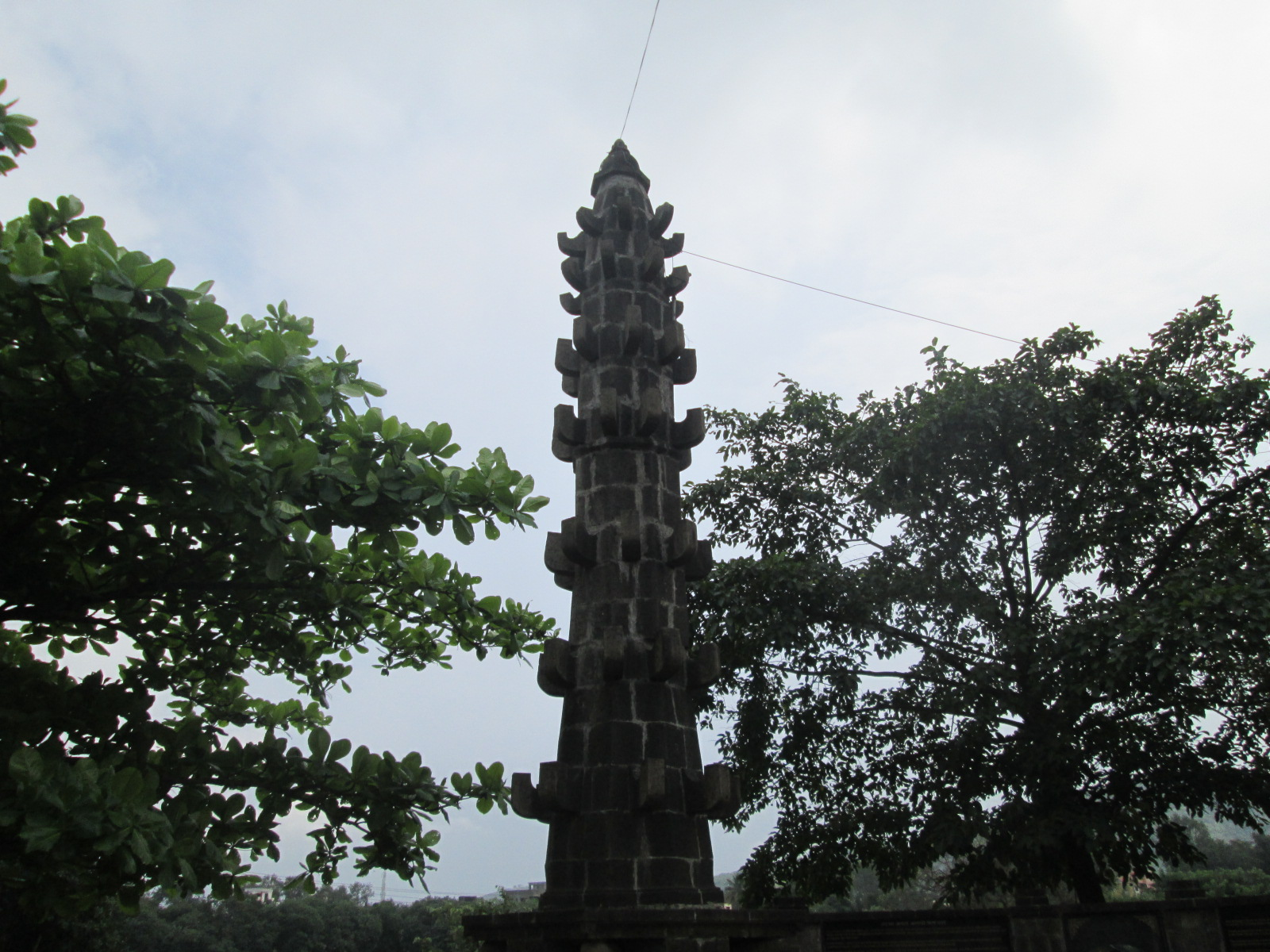
A Vijay Stambh (Victory Pillar) erected to commemorate Maratha victory over British. The pillar is located at Vadgaon/Wadgaon Maval, close to the city of Pune, India

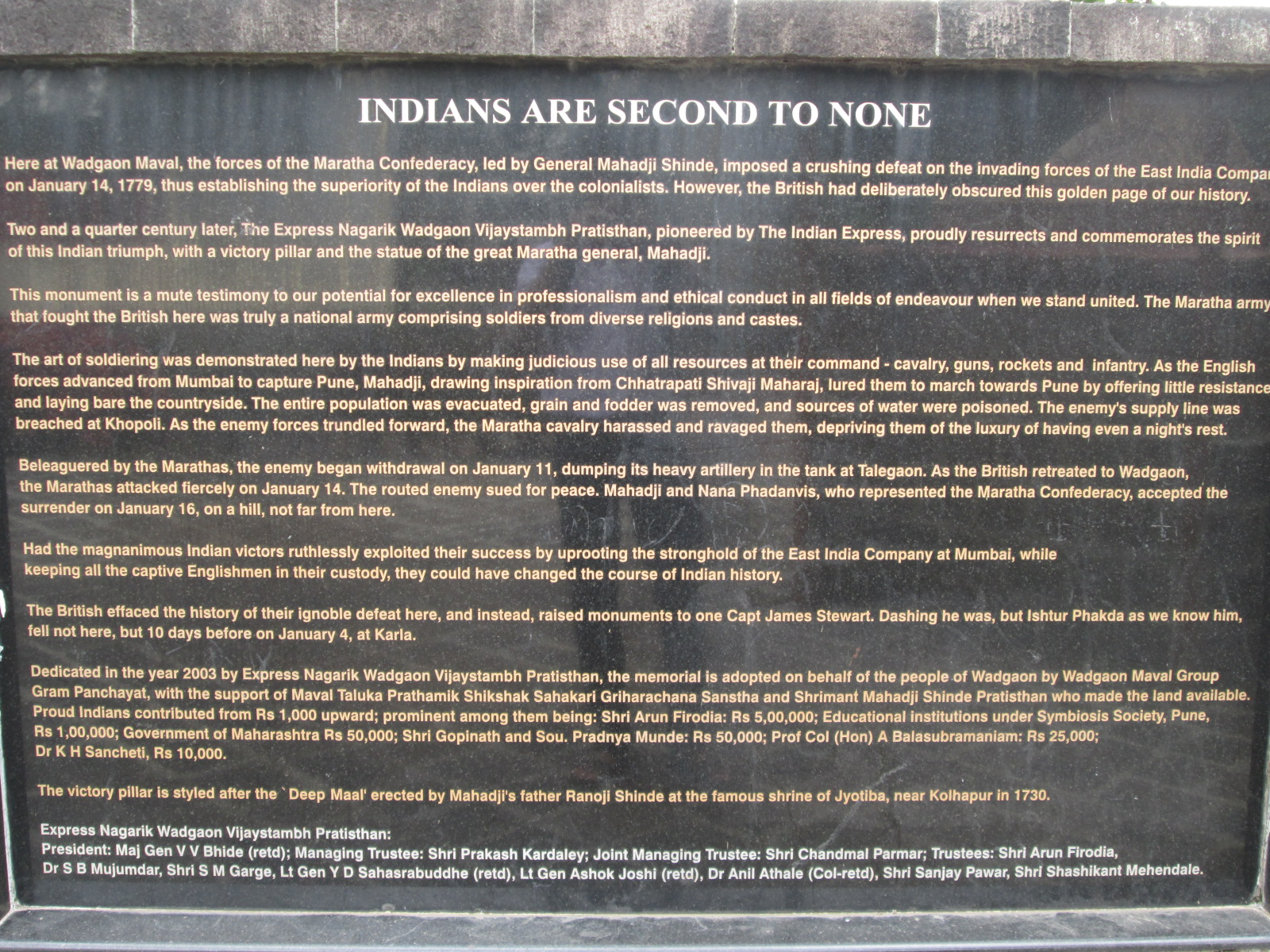
An information plaque describing the Maratha victory over British. The plaque is located at Vadgaon/Wadgaon Maval, close to the city of Pune, India

After capturing Bassein, Goddard marched towards Pune. But he was routed in the Battle of Bhor Ghat in April 1781 by Parshurambha, Haripant Phadke and Tukoji Holkar.

In central India, Shinde stationed himself at Malwa to challenge Camac. Initially, Shinde had an upper hand and British forces under Camac, being harassed and reduced, had to retreat to Hadur.

In February 1781, the British beat Shinde to the town of Sipri, but every move they made after that was shadowed by his much larger army, and their supplies were cut off, until they made a desperate night raid in late March, capturing not only supplies, but even guns and elephants. Thereafter, the military threat from Shinde's forces to the British was much reduced.

The contest was equally balanced now. Where Shinde scored a significant victory over Camac at Sironj, the British avenged the loss through the Battle of Durdah on 24 March 1781.

Colonel Murre arrived with fresh forces in April 1781 to assist Popham and Camac. After his defeat at Sipri, Shinde - eager to broker an alliance with the British and avoid further conflict - proposed a new treaty, in spite of objections from within his camp.

== Treaty of Salbai ==
The war ended on 17 May 1782 with the signing of the Treaty of Salbai between Warren Hastings and Shinde, and was later ratified by Hastings in June 1782, and by Nana Phadnavis in February 1783.

In exchange for the Maratha Empire recognising Raghunathrao's cession of Salsette and Bassein Fort to the East India Company, the British withdrew their support for him and recognised Madhavrao II as Peshwa of the Maratha Empire. The British also recognised Maratha claims west of the Jumna River, and agreed to return the territories it occupied over the course of the war. However, in return, the Marathas agreed to return the territories it had captured from the British, while also recognising British suzereinty over the Nawab of Arcot. The Marathas also promised to continue upholding the prior trading privileges enjoyed by the British, whilst agreeing not to support any European power. This was at a time when the British were keen to prevent France - already providing support to Mysore - from gaining further influence in the region during the ongoing Anglo-French War.

The treaty ended the First Anglo-Maratha War, restored the status quo, and established a relative peace between the two parties for 20 years until the outbreak of the Second Anglo-Maratha War.

== Aftermath ==
The war ultimately highlighted the strengths and weaknesses of the largely European style of warfare used by the East India Company, and the ganimi kava style of warfare used by the Marathas. Despite being on the offensive throughout the war, the British lacked mobile cavalry capable of pursuing the highly mobile Maratha armies. Conversely, although the Maratha armies consistently harried the British while avoiding pitched battles, these alone were not enough to achieve a decisive victory. The Marathas' extensive use of scorched earth tactics against the British also exacted a considerable toll on the local population.

Nevertheless, in the immediate term, the Marathas had successfully frustrated British machinations in western India by thwarting the restoration of Raghunathrao in exchange for minor territorial concessions, while compelling the British to recognise its own claims west of the Jumna River.

However, the most significant consequence of the First Anglo-Maratha War was the resulting isolation of the Kingdom of Mysore, which itself was fighting the East India Company in the Second Anglo-Mysore War; with the war against the Marathas concluded, the East India Company was able to concentrate its efforts against the kingdom. Although the 1784 Treaty of Mangalore between the British and Mysore similarly held Company ambitions at bay and forced it to remain neutral in the Maratha–Mysore war, Mysore would be soundly defeated by an Anglo-Maratha alliance 8 years later in the Third Anglo-Mysore War.

By the time of the Second Anglo-Maratha War, the defeat of Mysore, the consolidation of its own strength, and the increasing division within the Maratha Empire, placed the East India Company in a much stronger position than it enjoyed in the 1770s.

== In popular culture ==
The 2013 Hollywood film titled The Lovers is based on the backdrop of this war.

== See also ==
- Second Anglo-Maratha War
- Third Anglo-Maratha War
- List of Maratha dynasties and states
- James Hartley (Indian officer)
