= James Hartley (East India Company officer) =

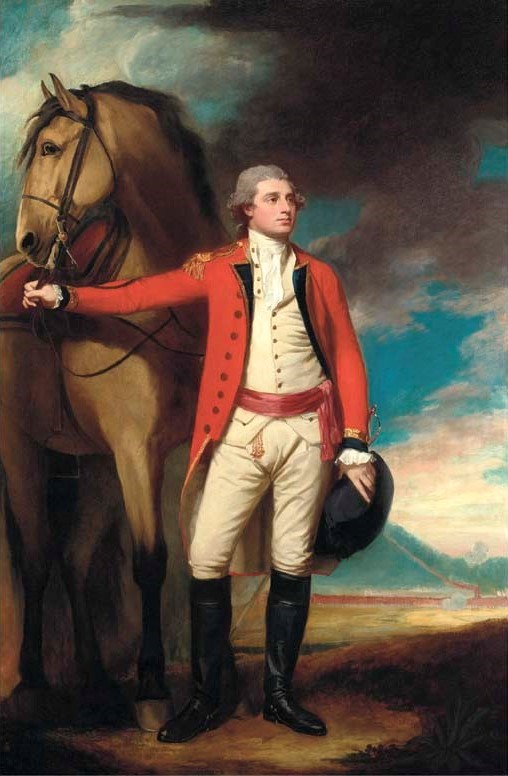
Major James Hartley, painting by George Romney, 1783–89.

James Hartley (1745–1799) was a British officer in the service of the East India Company. His employment was mainly in the company's wars against the Maratha Empire, and against Tipu Sultan of the Kingdom of Mysore.

== Early life ==
James Hartley was born in England in 1744 and was baptised at St Leonard & Mary, Malton, in North Yorkshire on 2 April 1744. His parents were from Calderdale: John Hartley, an Officer of the Excises, from Illingworth and his mother Mary Holker from Elland.

== Start of military career in India ==
Hartley entered the military service of the Bombay presidency in 1764, being nineteen years old. In 1765 he took part in expeditions against the piratical strongholds of Rairi and Malwan on the Malabar Coast.

By 1768 he had reached the rank of lieutenant, and in October 1770 he was made aide-de-camp to the Governor of Bombay. He superintended the disembarkation of the detachment which took Baroach in November 1772, and in July 1774 he was raised to the rank of captain, and received the command of the fourth battalion of Bombay Sepoys.

== In the First Anglo-Maratha War ==
The significant part of Hartley's career begins with the First Anglo-Maratha War. In February 1775 he was sent to co-operate with Colonel Keating in Gujarat. But the supreme government of the British East India Company in Calcutta put an end to the war in the following August (see Treaty of Purandar (1776), and Hartley, with the rest of the British forces, returned to Bombay.

Three years later hostilities were resumed. The Bombay government now sent an army to the Konkan, with orders to march across the Western Ghauts on Poonah. An advanced party of six companies of grenadier sepoys under Captain Stewart first took possession of the Bhore Ghaut, where they were joined by the main army under Colonel Charles Egerton. Hartley had been offered the post of quartermaster general to the army, but he preferred to take his place at the head of his battalion.

On 4 January 1779, Captain Stewart, a man of conspicuous gallantry, was killed in a skirmish at Karli, and Hartley was appointed to succeed him in command of the six companies of grenadiers.

On 9 Jan. the British army continued their march, and reached Tullygaom, only eighteen miles from Poonah. But John Carnac, the civil commissioner with the army, became alarmed at the increasing numbers of the Mahrattas, and determined on a retreat. Hartley strongly resisted this proposal, but was overruled, and the retreat began on 11 Jan. Hartley's reserve was directed to form the rear guard.

At daybreak on 12 Jan. the Mahrattas assailed the retreating army in strong force. The main energy of their attack was directed on the rear. The sepoys were thoroughly demoralized, and it was only by means of a personal address from Hartley that they were hindered from wholesale desertions. But, in spite of the condition of his own men and the superior numbers of the enemy, Hartley sustained the conflict with such skill that the army was able to make good its entry into Wargaum. Hartley in vain protested against the Convention of Wargaum, by which the British, in return for the surrender of their ally, Raghoba, were allowed to retire unmolested.

On his arrival at Bombay in the spring of 1779, Hartley was universally regarded as having saved the British army from annihilation. He was raised to the rank of lieutenant-colonel, and was appointed to the command of the European infantry on the Bombay establishment.

In December 1779, Hartley was sent with a small detachment to act under Colonel Thomas Goddard to Guzerat. He led the storming party which captured Ahmedabad on 18 February ensuing. On 8 May, however, he was recalled to Bombay, and entrusted with the duty of securing the Konkan, i.e. the district between the Western Ghauts and the sea, from which the Bombay government drew their supplies.

On 24 May he defeated and dispersed a party of Mahrattas who had besieged the fortified post of Kallian to the northeast of Bombay. On 1 October another attack of the enemy from the same direction was crushed at Mullungurh; the Bhore Ghaut, a central point of the mountain-chain, exactly opposite Bombay, was strongly guarded, and the Konkan effectually secured to the British.

In November Goddard, in deference to the wishes of the Bombay Presidency, embarked on the siege of Bassein (now Vasai). Hartley, with about two thousand men, was directed to maintain a position on the east, and so prevent the Mahrattas from raising the siege. On 10 December, a determined attack was made on Hartley's entrenchments at Doogaur by twenty thousand Mahrattas. After a severe conflict, the assailants were repulsed and the garrison of Bassein surrendered.

== Check to Hartley's career, Royal intervention ==
Hartley continued to act as military commandant in the Konkan when a despatch arrived from London acknowledging his services but declaring his recent promotion as lieutenant-colonel invalid. His further promotion and pay as a lieutenant-colonel were to be suspended till those who were his seniors should have been first promoted.

Thereupon, Hartley quit the army, deeply hurt, and in December 1781 started for England to lay his case before the Court of Directors. The latter refused to make any concession, but ultimately recommended him to King George III, who gave him the lieutenant-colonelcy of the 75th Regiment.

In April 1788 Hartley returned to India with his regiment, and was appointed Quartermaster General of the Bombay Army and a member of the military board.

== In the war with Tipu Sultan of Mysore ==
On the 1790 outbreak of war with Tipu Sultan of Mysore, Hartley received command of a detachment sent to the coast of Cochin to aid the company's ally, the Rajah of Travancore. In May Hartley received orders to invest Palghatcheri, an important fortress dominating the pass which leads through the western Ghauts into Mysore. On arriving within forty miles of the place Hartley heard that it had already surrendered.

He, however, continued his march, and occupied himself partly in collecting supplies for the main army at Trichinopoly, and partly in watching any movement of Tippoo's troops to the south-west. On 10 Dec. be inflicted a crushing defeat on vastly superior forces under Hussein Ali, Tippoo's general, at Calicut. The remnant of the beaten army was pursued to Feroke where it surrendered, and that fortress was occupied by the British.

In January 1791 Hartley advanced to Seringapatam now Srirangapatna, but the siege was eventually postponed, and the Bombay troops retired to Cannanore. On the renewal of the siege in December 1791 Hartley, who was acting under the immediate command of General Robert Abercromby, again started from Cannanore to join the main army. He reached the camp on 16 February 1792, and on 22 February took part in defeating a sortie specially directed against Abercromby's position on the north side of the fortress. Peace was concluded on 25 Feb., and Hartley, in recognition of his local knowledge, was made commander of the forces in the south-west provinces ceded by Tippoo.

== War with France ==
On the outbreak of War with France in 1793, Hartley held command of the expedition which captured the French settlement of Mahé in Malabar. In March 1794 he was promoted to the rank of colonel, and returned for a time to England.

In May 1796 he was made a major-general, and appointed to the staff in India. He returned to Bombay in 1797. In addition to his military rank he was now made a supervisor and magistrate for the province of Malabar.

== Resumed war with Tipu Sultan ==
In 1799 war again broke out with Tippoo, and it was determined to attack Seringapatam now Srirangapatna in strong force from east and west. The Bombay Army under General Stuart, with whom Hartley was associated as second in command, mustered at Cannanore and set out across the mountains of Coorg on the nearest road for Tippoo's capital.

On 5 March the advance force of three sepoy battalions under Colonel Montressor at Seedaseer was assailed by a division of the Mysore army. Hartley had gone forward early in the morning to reconnaitre. He was thus the first to perceive the serious nature of the attack, and, after sending a message to General Stuart, remained himself with the beleaguered battalions.

As the main body was at Seedapore, eight miles off, the advanced line was compelled for six hours to maintain itself against overwhelming numbers. At last Stuart came up with reinforcements, and Tippoo's army retreated. This victory rendered possible the investment of Seringapatam from the western side. Hartley was present at the storming of Tippoo's capital on 5 May 1799.

== Sudden death ==
He then returned to resume his civil duties in Malabar, but died after a very short illness on 4 October 1799, at Cannanore.
