= Jacob Mossel =

Dutch colonial governor (1704–1761)

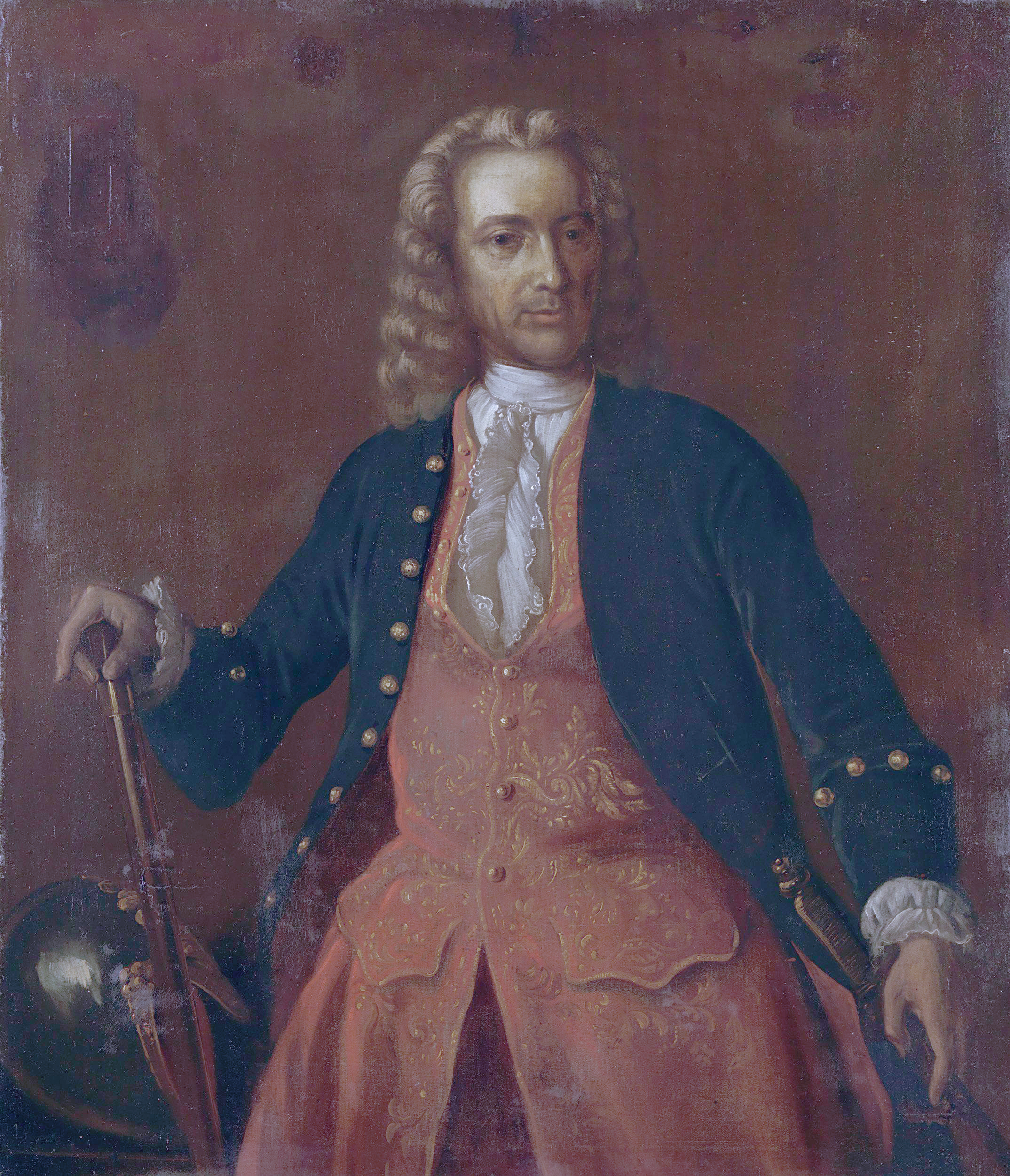

Governor-General of the Dutch East Indies at Batavia
- In office 1 November 1750 – 15 May 1761
- Preceded by: Gustaaf Willem van Imhoff
- Succeeded by: Petrus Albertus van der Parra

1st Director of the Amfioensociëteit
- In office 1745–1750
- Governor-General: Gustaaf Willem van Imhoff
- Succeeded by: Pieter van de Velde

Director-General of Batavia
- In office 1747–1750

Member of the Ordinary Council of the Indies
- In office 1743–1747

Member of the Extraordinary Council of the Indies
- In office 1740–1743

Director and Governor of Dutch Coromandel
- In office 1738–1743

Personal details
- Born: 28 November 1704 Enkhuizen, Dutch Republic
- Died: 15 May 1761 (aged 56) Batavia, Java, Dutch East Indies (present-day Jakarta, Indonesia)

Jacob Mossel (28 November 1704 – 15 May 1761) went from being a common sailor at the age of 15, to become Governor-General of the Dutch East Indies from 1750 to 1761. Due to his position as a sugar magnate and opium dealer, he became one of the richest people on the planet.

He was of noble birth, born in Enkhuizen. When he was 15 he left as an able-bodied seaman aboard a Fluyt (a type of Dutch sailing cargo vessel) called de Haringthuyn, bound for the Indies. As his family had a coat of arms, he was able to obtain a privileged position, through Dirk van Cloon, and was sent to the Dutch Coromandel (1721). On 30 March 1730, he married Adriana Appels, the fourteen-year-old stepdaughter of Adriaan van Pla, Governor of Dutch Coromandel. Jacob Mossel worked himself up finally to Governor and Director of Dutch Coromandel. In 1740 he got the title of Counsellor-extraordinary of the Indies and in 1742 he became a member of the Dutch Council of the Indies (Raad van Indië) in Batavia/Jakarta.

In 1745, he became the first Director of the Amfioensociëteit, which tried to regulate its monopoly of the trade in opium. In 1747, he was named as the Director-General (the second highest post in the Dutch East Indies). When in 1750, Gustaaf Willem van Imhoff died, Mossel succeeded him as Governor-General of the Dutch East Indies. He remained in post until his own death in 1761.

Jacob Mossel ruled the Indies during a period in which things got steadily worse for the Dutch East India Company. He made may economies and he ended the war in Bantam Province, recognising that his predecessor had handled things badly. The Dutch were threatened by the expansion of the British East India Company. In the battle for Bengal, Mossel lost heavily to the British. Mossel was a supporter of the policy to allow private entrepreneurs to trade for themselves in the territory of the Indies. This concerned small scale trading in which the Company could make no profit. Following that, Batavia/Jakarta underwent a period of growth, which, because of his successors tax regulations, came to nothing. The Company was plagued by corruption and self-interest among its office holders. Jacob Mossel was also involved in this. His great fortune could not in any case have been put together from his official salary. The initiatives he took against corruption were not very effective.

To curb exaggerated displays of wealth, in 1754 he brought in a so-called "Regulation against pomp and splendour", which tried to lay down exactly what wealth an officer could display. These details went from the number of buttonholes they could have to the size of their houses. Of course, the regulations did not apply to himself, and there was great feasting at his daughter's wedding. After his death at Batavia/Jakarta, from a wasting disease, he was given a magnificent funeral.

== Sources ==
- Comprehensive Dutch website on the history of the Dutch East Indies
- Inventaris van de collectie Jacob Mossel, 1699–1801. (1971) Nationaal Archief (NA), Den Haag. Stukken betreffende Jacob Mossel en andere leden van dit geslacht en de Amfioen sociëteit, nummer toegang 1.11.06.03. URL bezocht op 10 juni 2006.
- Emmer, P. C. e.a. (1986) "Colonialism and Migration: Indentured Labour Before and After Slavery", in: Ross, R. J. e.a. Colonial Cities. Essays on Urbanism in a Colonial Context. Series: Comparative Studies in Overseas History, Vol. 5., Springer, pp. 81–83.
