= Battle of Wadgaon =

1779 battle of the First Anglo-Maratha War

- Part of First Anglo-Maratha War
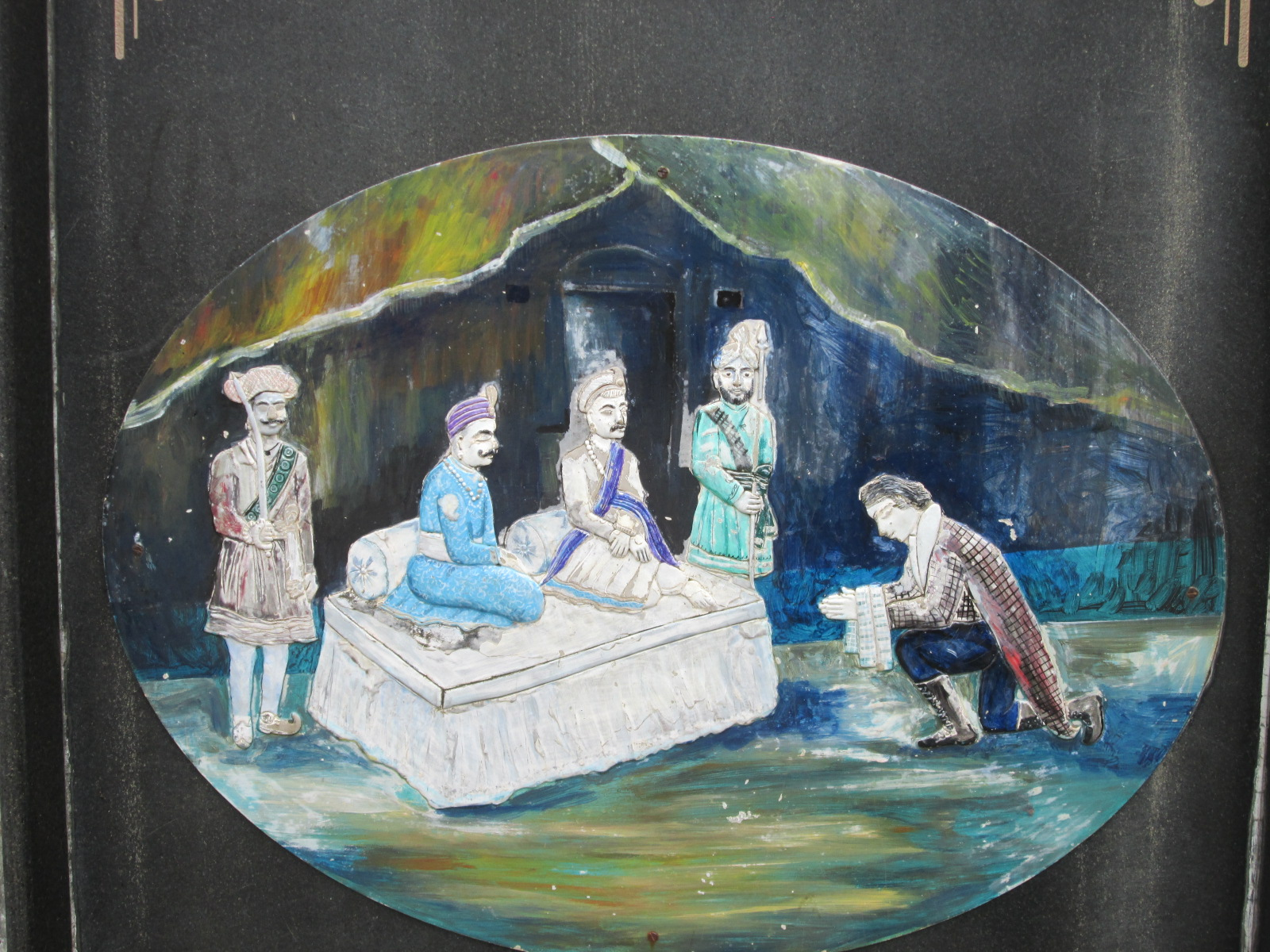
- Mural depicting a British officer surrendering to Mahadaji Shinde and Nana Fadnavis after the battle
Date	12–13 January 1779
Location	Vadgaon Maval, Maharashtra 18.7486°N 73.641°E
Result	Maratha victory; Signing of the Treaty of Salbai

Belligerents
Maratha Empire	East India Company

Commanders and leaders
Mahadaji Shinde; Tukoji Rao Holkar; Nana Fadnavis	Thomas Goddard; James Stuart; Charles Egerton; Lt. Col Cay; Lt. Col Cockburn

Strength
	4,000 British forces, inclusive of artillery and gun men's under Stewart and Egerton. small contingents of infantry and gunmens under Raghunath Rao
- Location within Maharashtra Wadgaon (India)

The Battle of Wadgaon (12–13 January 1779) was fought between the Maratha Confederacy and the British East India Company near Vadgaon Maval village in Maharashtra and was part of the First Anglo-Maratha War. A British force of over 3,000 troops, supported by 19,000 bullocks, had run out of supplies during a slow march over the Ghats which was aimed at joining with another force coming from Bengal. Mahadaji Shinde's men attacked and surrounded the British at Wadgoan as they retreated from their exposed position. The British were forced to surrender and agreed a treaty in February 1779 before being allowed to return to Bombay. In 2003, a group named 'Express Nagrik Vadgaon Vijaystambh Pratishthan' installed a victory pillar to commemorate the victory in the Battle of Wadgaon. The victory at the Battle of Wadgaon is still celebrated in the region every year.
