= Vadgaon Maval =

Vadgaon
- town
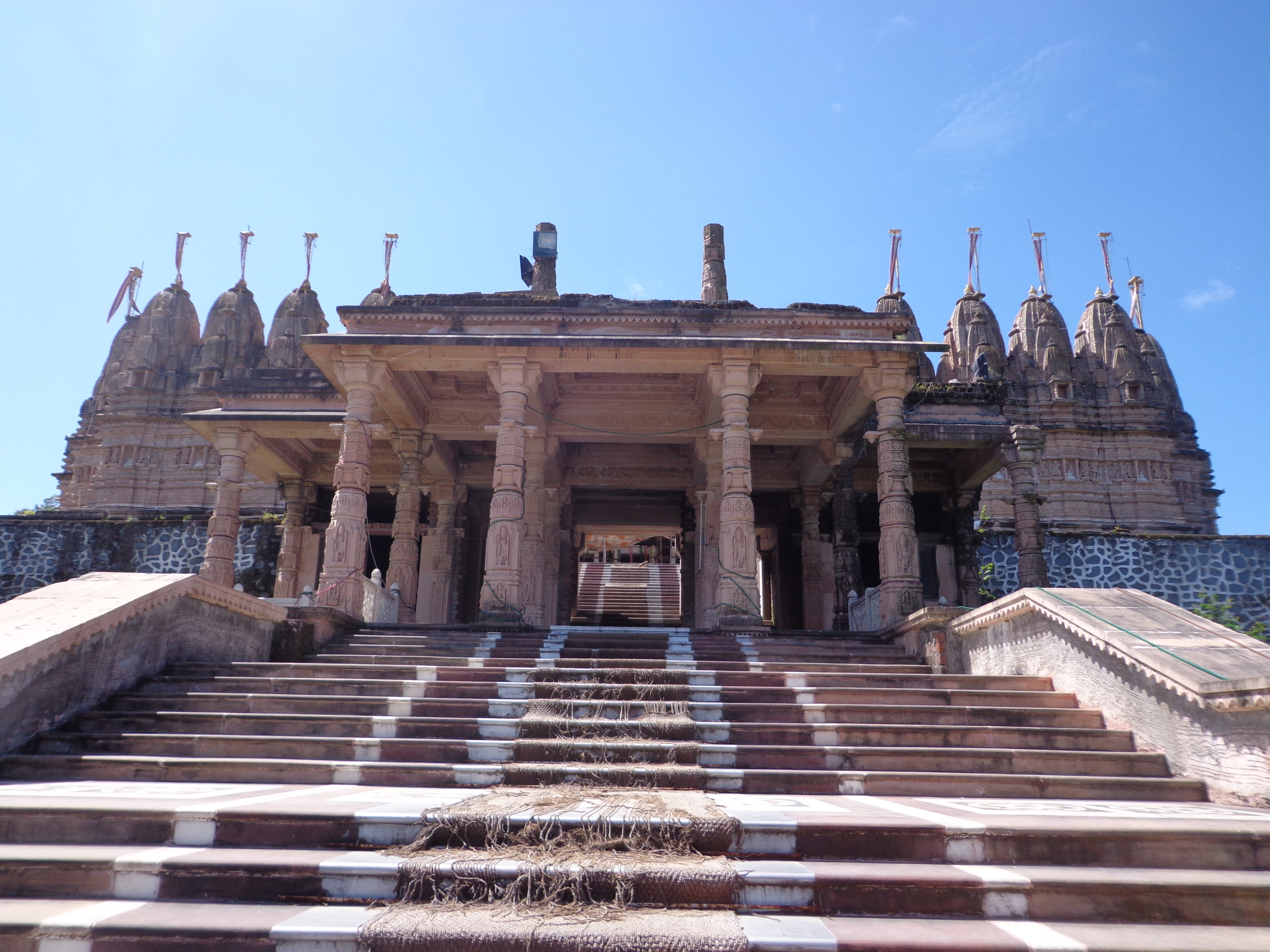
- Parshwa Prandyalay Jain Temple

- Location in Maharashtra, India Vadgaon (India)
- Coordinates: 18.7486°N 73.641°E
- Country: India
- State: Maharashtra
- District: Pune

Population (2001)
  - Total: 11,359

Languages
  - Official: Marathi
- Time zone: UTC+5:30 (IST)
- Postal code: 412106

Vadgaon or Vadgaon Maval (formerly spelled Wadgaon or Wargaum) (Marathi: वडगाव मावळ ) is a census town and nagar panchayat in Mawal taluka, Pune district, in the Indian state of Maharashtra. Vadgaon is famous for its Jain and Potoba Maharaj temples and Mhadaji shinde garden.

== Administration ==
As a Nagar panchayat, Vadgaon is the headquarters for administration of Katavi and is headed by a nagaradhasha elected representative. At the time of the 2011 Census of India, it was a self-contained nagar panchayat, meaning that it governed no other constituent villages. It is Maval Taluka's main village. It is mainly divided into Chavan Wada, Dhore Wada, Mhalaskar Vasti, Kude Wada, Chavan Nagar, Mali Nagar, Bhilare Wasti, Keshav Nagar.Deccan hill.

== Demographics ==
As of 2001 India census, had a population of 14,600. Males constituted 52% of the population and females 48%. The average literacy rate was 75%, higher than the national average of 59.5%: male literacy was 80%, and female literacy was 69%. In Vadgaon, 13% of the population was under 6.

== History ==
In the First Anglo-Maratha War, Wadgaon (as the name was then spelled) was the site of the Battle of Wadgaon वडगावची लढाई in which the Maratha Empire inflicted a defeat on the East India Company and of a treaty in which the British made considerable concessions.
