= Ganimi Kava =

Guerrilla warfare tactic

Ganimi Kava was a guerrilla warfare tactic developed by the Maratha Kingdom during the 17th and 18th centuries. It was pioneered by Shivaji Maharaj, allowing Maratha forces to fight effectively against larger enemy armies.

== Key features ==
Ganimi Kava tactics included:

- Swift cavalry raids
- Hit-and-run attacks
- Using terrain to their advantage
- Intelligence gathering
- Disrupting enemy supply lines

== Implementation ==
Chhatrapati Shivaji Maharaj strategically used the rugged terrain of the Western Ghats. He deployed fast, mobile cavalry units to carry out surprise attacks, effectively countering the larger but slower armies of the Mughal Empire and the Adil Shahi dynasty.

== Notable battles ==
Key battles demonstrating Ganimi Kava include:

- Battle of Pratapgad (1659)
- Recapture of Sinhagad (1670)

== Legacy ==
Ganimi Kava continued to influence Maratha military strategy under later leaders such as the Peshwas. Its core principles have influenced modern guerrilla warfare and asymmetric military tactics.
