= 1515 =

1515 in various calendars
- Gregorian calendar: 1515; MDXV
- Ab urbe condita: 2268
- Armenian calendar: 964; ԹՎ ՋԿԴ
- Assyrian calendar: 6265
- Balinese saka calendar: 1436–1437
- Bengali calendar: 921–922
- Berber calendar: 2465
- English Regnal year: 6 Hen. 8 – 7 Hen. 8
- Buddhist calendar: 2059
- Burmese calendar: 877
- Byzantine calendar: 7023–7024
- Chinese calendar: 甲戌年 (Wood Dog); 4212 or 4005 — to — 乙亥年 (Wood Pig); 4213 or 4006
- Coptic calendar: 1231–1232
- Discordian calendar: 2681
- Ethiopian calendar: 1507–1508
- Hebrew calendar: 5275–5276
- Hindu calendars
- Vikram Samvat: 1571–1572
- Shaka Samvat: 1436–1437
- Kali Yuga: 4615–4616
- Holocene calendar: 11515
- Igbo calendar: 515–516
- Iranian calendar: 893–894
- Islamic calendar: 920–921
- Japanese calendar: Eishō 12 (永正１２年)
- Javanese calendar: 1432–1433
- Julian calendar: 1515; MDXV
- Korean calendar: 3848
- Minguo calendar: 397 before ROC 民前397年
- Nanakshahi calendar: 47
- Thai solar calendar: 2057–2058
- Tibetan calendar: ཤིང་ཕོ་ཁྱི་ལོ་ (male Wood-Dog); 1641 or 1260 or 488 — to — ཤིང་མོ་ཕག་ལོ་ (female Wood-Boar); 1642 or 1261 or 489

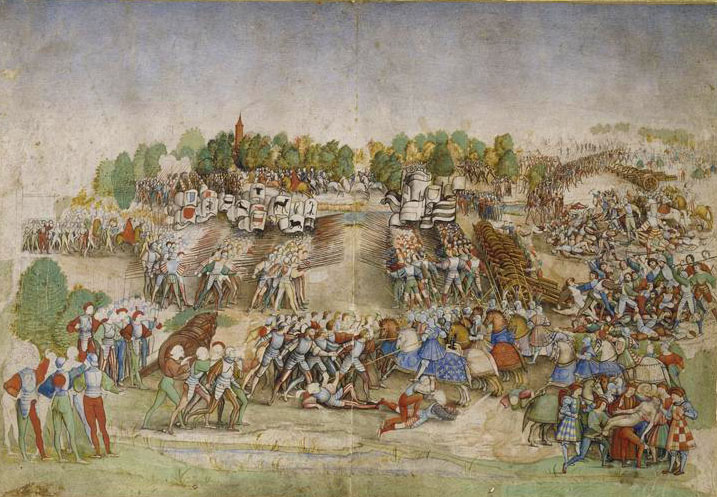
September 13: French Army defeats Swiss mercenaries at the Battle of Marignano.

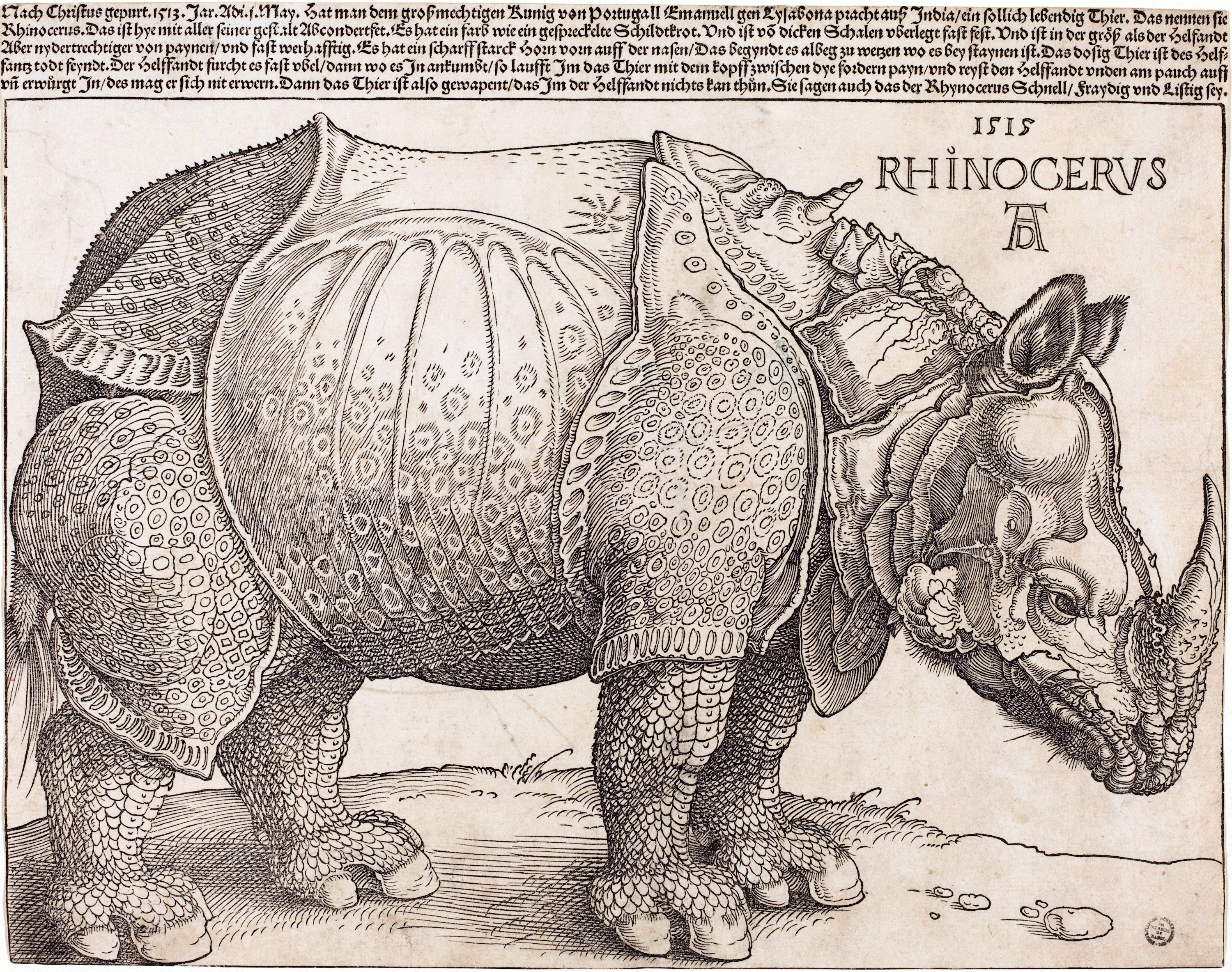
May 20: The first rhinoceros seen in Europe arrives in Lisbon. (woodcut by Albrecht Dürer)

Year 1515 (MDXV) was a common year starting on Monday of the Julian calendar.

== Events ==
=== January–March ===
- January 1 - King Louis XII of France dies of severe gout after a reign of 17 years, and his son-in-law, François, inherits the throne.
- January 25 – François, is crowned King of France in the Cathedral of Reims, with his wife Claude, daughter of the late King Louis XII, crowned as Queen consort.
- January - In Vietnam, an uprising led by Phùng Chương broke out in Tam Đảo and was quickly quelled by general Trịnh Duy Sản under emperor Lê Tương Dực of the Lê dynasty.
- February 8 – King Henry VIII of England opens the English Parliament. Henry's chief advisor, Sir Thomas Nevill, is elected Speaker of the House of Commons
- February 11 – George of Kratovo, a silversmith in Serbia, becomes a martyr to the Christian faith as he is burned to death on a pyre for refusing to convert to Islam.
- March 3 - Mary Tudor, sister of King Henry VIII of England and widow of King Louis XII of France, is secretly married to the Duke of Suffolk in the presence of the new King of France, Francois.
- March 4 – Dukaginzade Ahmed Pasha, who was appointed as Grand Vizier of the Ottoman Empire less than three months earlier, is executed by order of the Sultan Selim I, and is replaced by his predecessor, Hersekzade Ahmed Pasha.
- March 12 – In Italy, Costanzo II Sforza, Lord of Pesaro, is mortally wounded by a gunshot from an arquebus rifle while traveling with Maximilian Sforza, Duke of Milan. He dies a little more than a month later, on April 14.
- March 31 –
  - Pope Leo X issues a papal bull, at the suggestion of the German cardinal Albert of Brandenburg, providing for a special indulgence on worshipers in four Roman Catholic dioceses in order to pay for construction of St. Peter's Basilica in Rome, with half to be paid to Albert for services.
  - Multiple acts of the English parliament are given royal assent by King Henry VIII, including the Deepening River at Canterbury Act 1514, the Thames Watermen Act 1514, and the Felons and Murderers Act 1514.

=== April–June ===
- April 1 – The Portuguese Navy, led by Afonso de Albuquerque, conquers the strategic Hormuz Island as King Turan Shah and his prime minister, Rais Nureddin invited Albuquerque to land his forces and formally take possession of Hormuz.
- April 15 – The Emirate of Oman, ruled by Muhammad bin Ismail, becomes a protectorate of Portugal.
- April 17 – Mehmed I Giray becomes the new ruler of the Tatar Crimean Khanate (in what is now Russian-occupied Ukraine) upon the death of his father, Meñli I Giray.
- April 23 – In Portuguese-occupied Morocco, the Governor of Safi, Nuno Fernandes de Ataíde, conducts an unsuccessful attack on Marrakesh, and is forced to retreat by defenders led by the Emir Nasr ibn Chentaf al-Hintati.
- May 13 – Mary Tudor, Queen of France, and Charles Brandon, 1st Duke of Suffolk, are officially married at Greenwich (near London).
- May 20 – "Ulysses", the first known rhinoceros in Europe, arrives at Lisbon in Portugal after being brought by ship from India.
- June 13 – Battle of Turnadag: The army of Ottoman sultan Selim I defeats the beylik of Dulkadir under Bozkurt of Dulkadir.

=== July–September ===
- July 2 – Manchester Grammar School is endowed by Hugh Oldham, the first free grammar school in England.
- July 22 – At the First Congress of Vienna, a double wedding takes place to cement agreements. Louis, only son of King Vladislaus II of Hungary, marries Mary of Austria, granddaughter of Maximilian I, Holy Roman Emperor; and Mary's brother, Archduke Ferdinand, marries Vladislaus' daughter, Anna.
- August 12 – Isabella of Austria is crowned as Queen consort of Denmark and Norway after her marriage to King Christian II is ratified.
- August 25 – Conquistador Diego Velázquez de Cuéllar founds Havana, Cuba.
- September 8– Lopo Soares de Albergaria becomes the new Viceroy of Portuguese India as Afonso de Albuquerque resigns because of health problems.
- September 14– The Battle of Marignano concludes after two days as the army of Francis I of France defeats the Swiss mercenaries, thanks to the timely arrival of a Venetian army. The French Army enters the Duchy of Milan on September 17 and reclaims it for King Francis.

=== October–December ===
- October 2 – In India, Suja Rathore of Marwar dies after ruling Marawar for 23 years, and two of his grandsons, Biram Singh Rathore and Rao Ganga, compete for the throne.
- October 4 – Maximilian Sforza, Duke of Milan, surrenders to the French forces and is imprisoned until the arrival of King Francis.
- October 8 – Portuguese explorer Juan Díaz de Solís departs from Sanlúcar de Barrameda in Spain with three ships and 70 men on a disastrous expedition toward the southern part of the continent of South America. Soon after landing at what is now Uruguay, Díaz and most of his crew are killed by the Charrúa people shortly after their arrival in January.
- October 11 – King Francis enters the city of Milan with Duke Charles III of Savoy and Marquis William IX of Montferrat. Francis becomes Duke of Milan and sends Duke Maximilian into exile in France, providing hm with an annual annuity of 35,000 écus.
- November 8 – At Jodhpur, Rao Ganga became the new ruler of the Kingdom of Marwar in what is now the Indian state of Rajasthan, after the Rathore nobility determine that he is better suited to rule than his older brother Rao Viramde or his cousin Biram Singh.
- November 15 – Thomas Wolsey is invested as a Roman Catholic Cardinal.
- December 18 – King Francis I of France, victorious in the battle of Marignano in Italy and the new ruler of Milan, begins four days of meetings in Bologna with Pope Leo X. King Francis agrees to ensure the Pope's authority over the Catholic Church in France, and Leo promises to support Francis' claim to the throne of Naples.
- December 24 – Thomas Wolsey is named Lord Chancellor of England.
- December 22 – The 3rd English Parliament of King Henry VIII closes with the King giving royal assent to the Avowries Act, the Kynges Revenues Act, the "Acte for the Staple of Calice" and "the Act avoiding pulling down of Towns".

=== Date unknown ===
- Cardinal Thomas Wolsey orders construction to begin on what is to become Henry VIII's future summer residence Hampton Court Palace.
- Bartolomé de las Casas urges Ferdinand II of Aragon to end Amerindian slavery, and recommends experimental free towns.
- The Portuguese are the first Europeans to land in Timor island, as the first settlers arrive to the north coast of Madeira Island, there establishing Saint George.
- Dürer's Rhinoceros is cut.
- The Ottomans conquer the last beyliks of Anatolia, the Beylik of Dulkadir and the Ramadanid Emirate.
- Henry Cornelius Agrippa returns to Northern Italy.

== Births ==
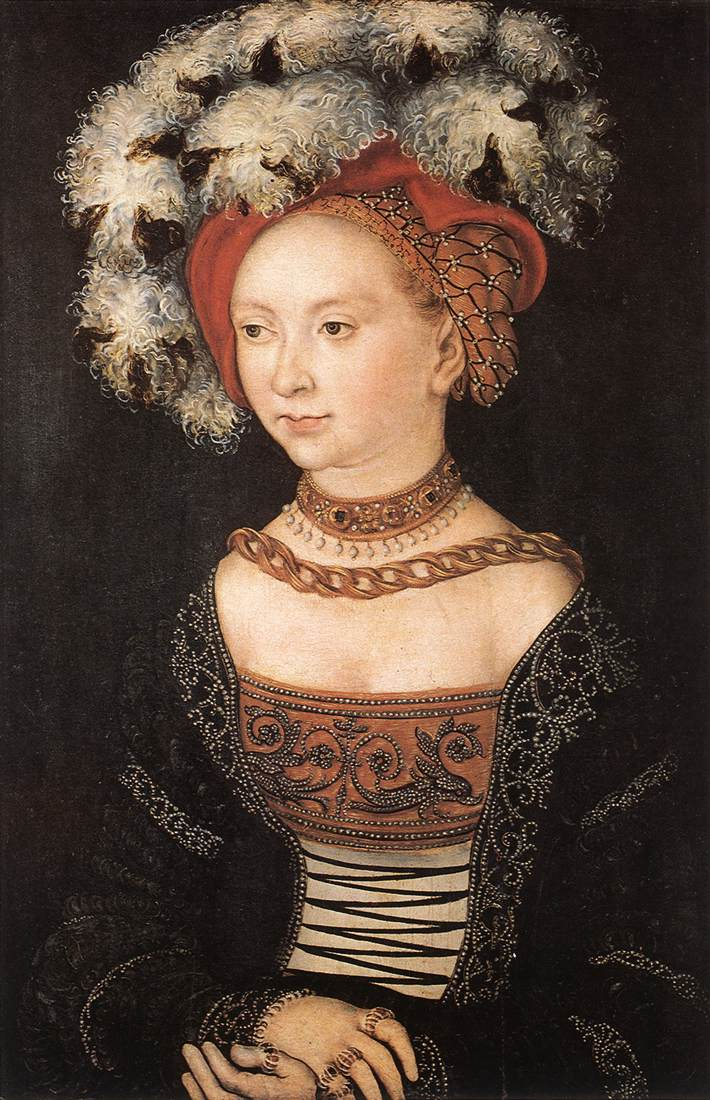
Sybille of Saxony

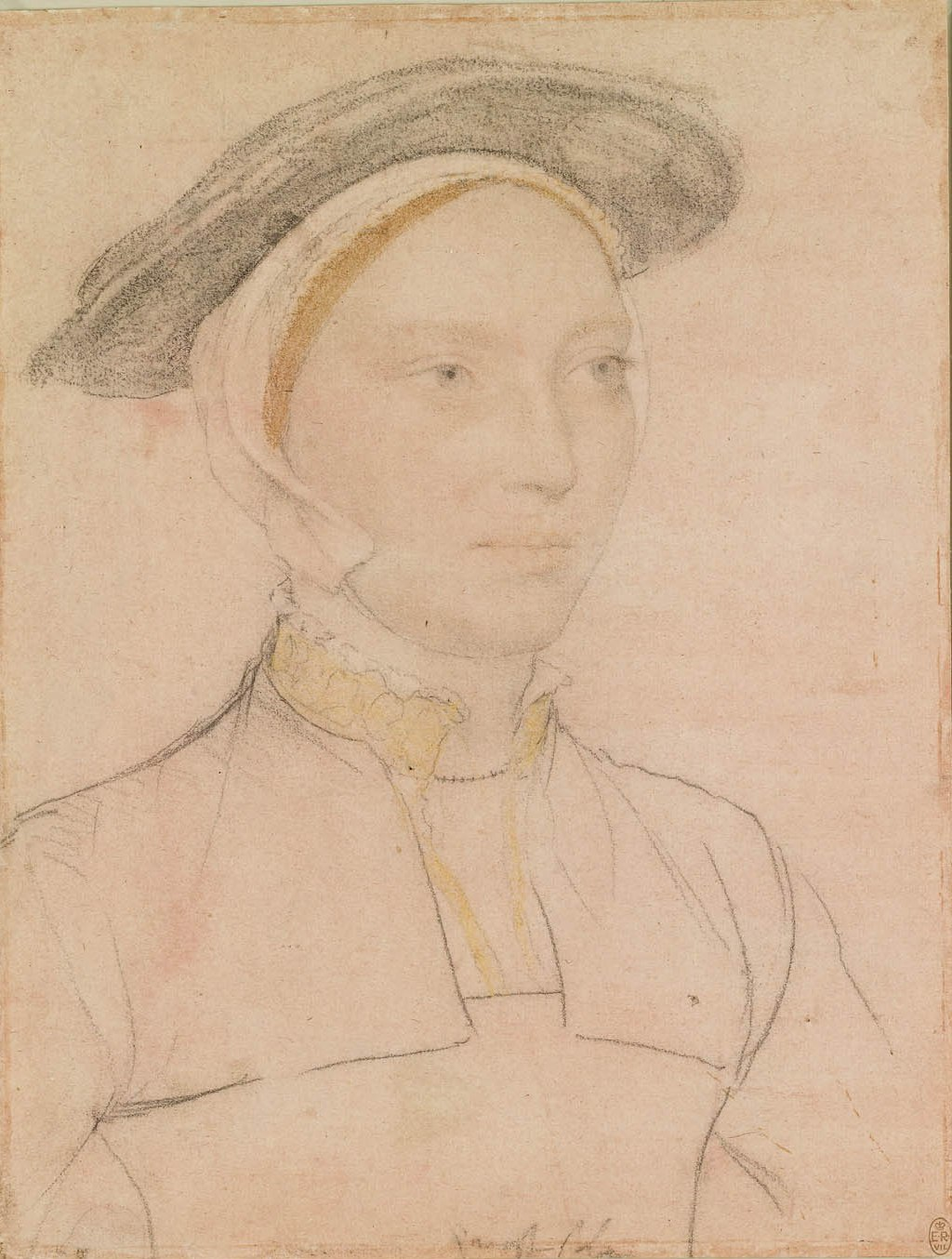
Anne Parr, Countess of Pembroke

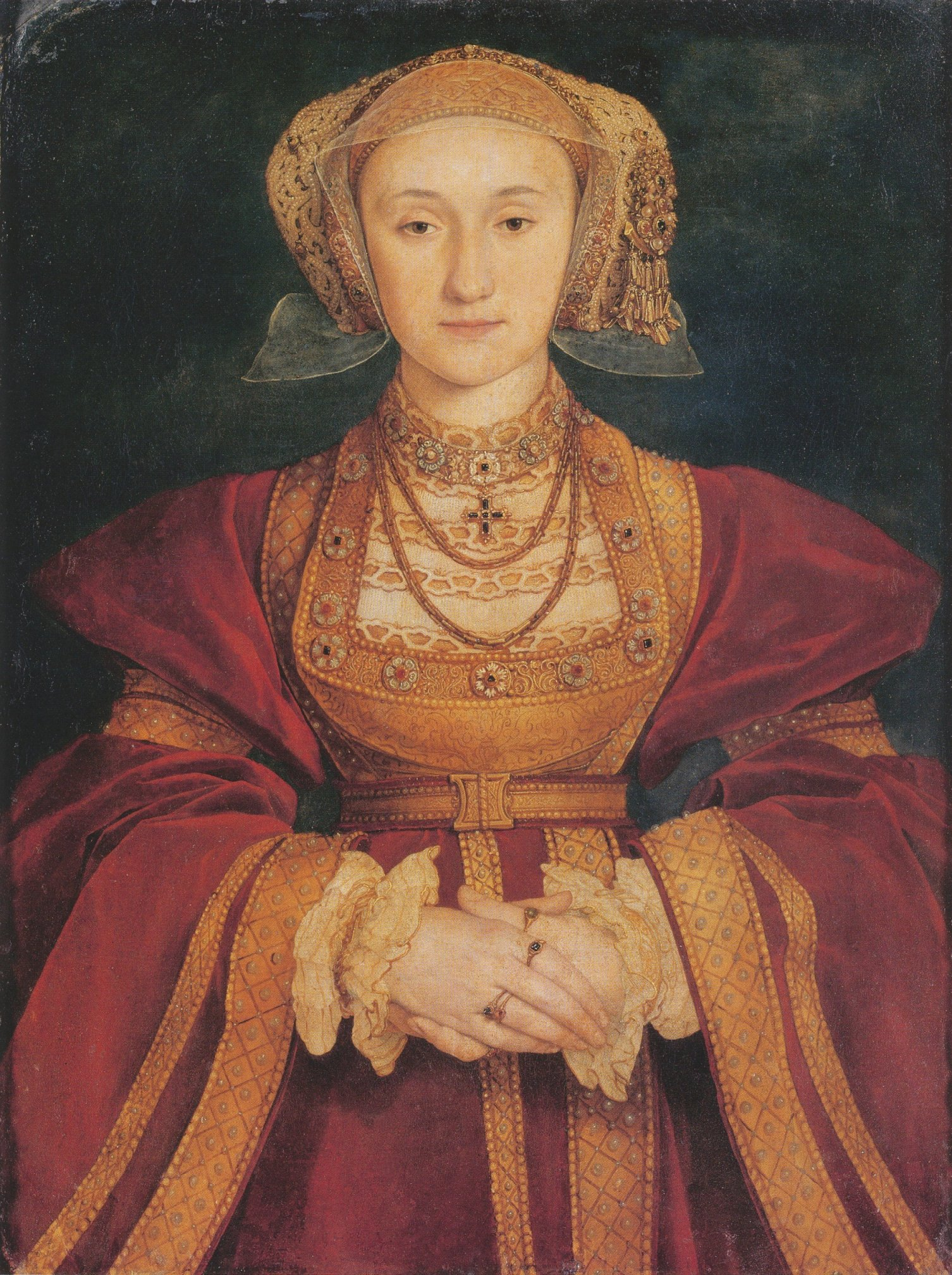
Anne of Cleves

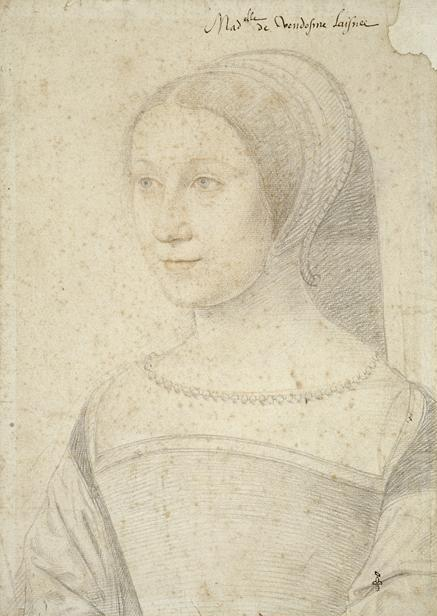
Mary of Bourbon

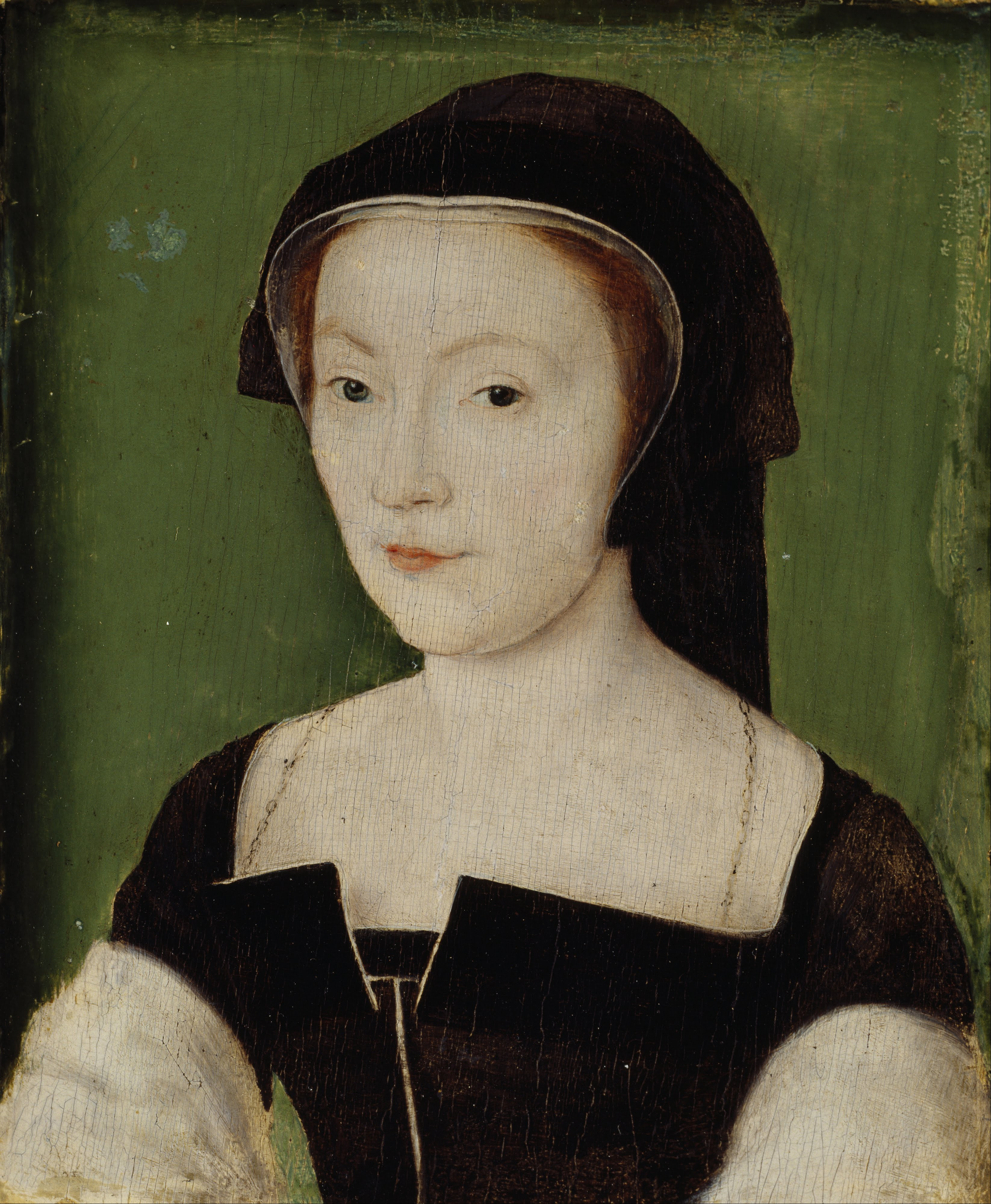
Mary of Guise

- January 1 – Johann Weyer, Dutch physician (d. 1588)
- February 4 – Mikołaj "the Black" Radziwiłł, Polish magnate (d. 1565)
- February 14 – Frederick III, Elector Palatine, ruler from the house of Wittelsbach (d. 1576)
- February 18 – Valerius Cordus, German physician, botanist and author (d. 1544)
- March 10 – Injong of Joseon, 12th king of the Joseon Dynasty of Korea (d. 1545)
- March 12 – Caspar Othmayr, German Protestant priest, theologian and composer (d. 1553)
- March 28 – Teresa of Ávila, Spanish Carmelite nun, poet and saint (d. 1582)
- May 2 – Sibylle of Saxony, Duchess of Saxe-Lauenburg (d. 1592)
- May 12
  - Christoph, Duke of Württemberg (1550–1568) (d. 1568)
  - Gilbert Kennedy, 3rd Earl of Cassilis, Scottish politician and judge (d. 1558)
- June 15 – Anne Parr, Countess of Pembroke, English countess (d. 1552)
- July 4 – Eleonora d'Este, Ferranese noblewoman (d. 1575)
- July 10 – Francisco de Toledo, Viceroy of Peru (d. 1582)
- July 14 – Philip I, Duke of Pomerania-Wolgast (d. 1560)
- July 21 – Philip Neri, Italian Roman Catholic saint (d. 1595)
- September 8 – Alfonso Salmeron, Spanish biblical scholar and early Jesuit (d. 1585)
- September 22 – Anne of Cleves, Fourth Queen of Henry VIII (d. 1557)
- October 4 – Lucas Cranach the Younger, German painter (d. 1586)
- October 7 – Infante Duarte, Duke of Guimarães, son of King Manuel I of Portugal (d. 1540)
- October 8 – Margaret Douglas, daughter of Archibald Douglas (d. 1578)
- October 15 – Leone Strozzi, French Navy admiral (d. 1554)
- October 29
  - Vincenzo Borghini, Italian monk (d. 1580)
  - Mary of Bourbon, daughter of Charles, Duke of Vendôme (d. 1538)
- November 22 – Mary of Guise, queen of James V and regent of Scotland (d. 1560)
- December 15 – Maria of Saxony, Duchess of Pomerania (d. 1583)
- date unknown
  - Gilbert Kennedy, 3rd Earl of Cassilis, Scottish peer (d. 1558)
  - Sebastian Castellio, rector of the College of Geneva (d. 1563)
  - Sehzade Mustafa, First born son of Suleiman the Magnificent by Mahidevran Hatun (d. 1553)
  - Cristóbal Acosta, Portuguese doctor and natural historian (d. 1580)
  - Injong of Joseon, 12th king of the Joseon Dynasty of Korea (d. 1545)
  - Pierre de la Ramée, French humanist scholar (d. 1572)
  - Thomas Seckford, Master of Requests for Elizabeth I (d. 1587)
  - Thomas Watson, English Catholic bishop (d. 1584)
- probable
  - Leonard Digges, English mathematician and surveyor (d. c. 1559)
  - Jean Maillard, French composer
  - Laurence Nowell, English antiquarian (d. 1571)
  - Cipriano de Rore, Flemish composer and teacher (d. 1565)
  - Nicholas Throckmorton, English churchman, last abbot of Westminster (d. 1571)
  - John Willock, Scottish reformer (d. 1585)

== Deaths ==
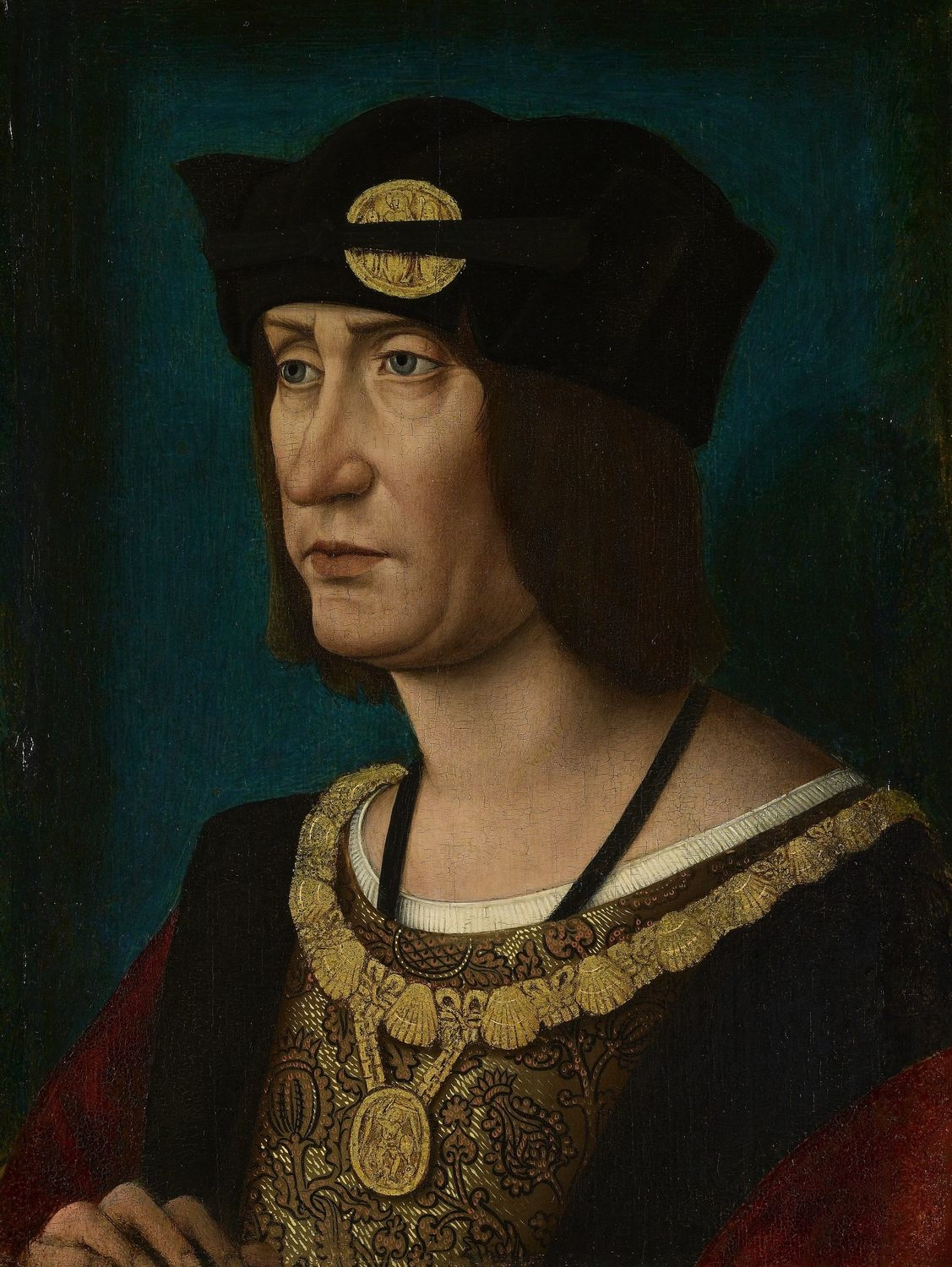
King Louis XII

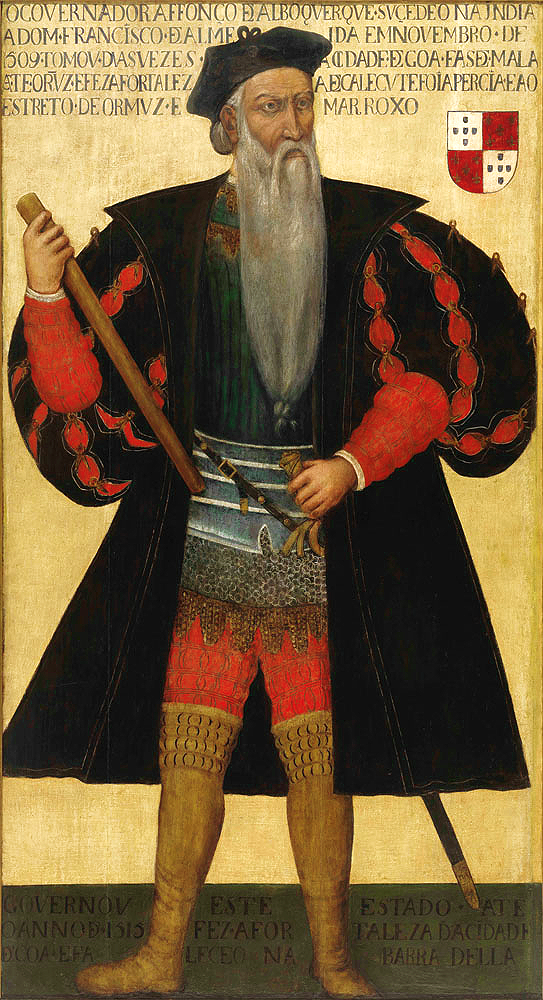
Afonso de Albuquerque

- January 1 – King Louis XII of France (b. 1462)
- February 6 – Aldus Manutius, Venetian printer (b. c. 1449)
- March 16 – Queen Janggyeong, Korean royal consort (b. 1491)
- April 15 – Mikołaj Kamieniecki, Polish nobleman (szlachcic) and first Great Hetman of the Crown (b. 1460)
- June 13 – Alaüddevle Bozkurt, Bey of Anatolian Dulkadir
- September 4 – Barbara of Brandenburg, Bohemian queen (b. 1464)
- September 9 – Joseph Volotsky, caesaropapist ideologist of the Russian Orthodox Church
- October – Bartolomeo d'Alviano, Venetian general (b. 1455)
- November 5 – Mariotto Albertinelli, Italian painter (b. 1474)
- December 2 – Gonzalo Fernández de Córdoba, Spanish general and statesman (b. 1453)
- December 16 – Afonso de Albuquerque, Portuguese naval general (b. 1453)
- December 18 – Alexander Stewart, Duke of Ross, Scottish prince (b. 1514)
- date unknown
  - Giovanni Giocondo, Italian friar, architect and classical scholar (b. c. 1433 in Verona)
  - Eoghan Mac Cathmhaoil, Irish Bishop of Clogher since 1505
  - Meñli I Giray, khan of the Crimean Khanate (b. 1445)
  - Pietro Lombardo, Italian Renaissance sculptor and architect (b. 1435 in Carona (Ticino))
  - Nezahualpilli, Aztec philosopher (b. 1464)
  - Alonso de Ojeda, Spanish conquistador (b. 1466)
- probable
  - Vincenzo Foppa, Italian Renaissance painter (b. 1430)
  - Quilago, queen regnant of the Cochasquí in Ecuador (b. 1490)
