= Rukmavati Bai =

Consort of Mughal Emperor Akbar

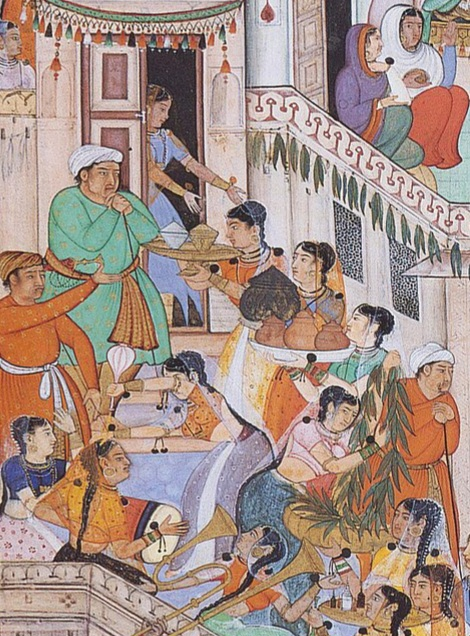
- Ladies of the harem engaging in celebration after the birth of Prince Murad, Rukmavati possibly among them c.1590
- Born: Jodhpur, Kingdom of Marwar, Mughal Empire (modern-day Rajasthan, India)
- Died: Agra, Mughal Empire
- Spouse: Akbar
- House: Rathore (by birth) Mughal/Timurid (by marriage)
- Father: Maldeo Rathore
- Mother: Tipu Gudi
- Religion: Hinduism

Rukmavati Bai was a consort of Mughal Emperor Akbar.

== Life ==
By birth, Rukmavati a member of Rathore clan of Kingdom of Marwar as the daughter of Maldeo Rathore, the Rao of Marwar, by his patar , Tipu Gudi, who was the daughter of Mano Guno of the Rohila community. She had two brothers, Mahesdas and Dungarsi.

=== Marriage to Akbar ===
She married Akbar as part of a dolo union as opposed to a formal marriage, signifying the bride's lower status in her paternal household. The exact date of her marriage to Akbar is not recorded. However, she was respected in the imperial harem as she had many powerful in-laws. Three of her half-sisters, Kankavati Bai, Lal Bai, and Ratnavati were the consorts of Sultan Mahmud Shah of Gujarat, Islam Sher Suri of the Sur Dynasty and Haji Khan Pathan of Mewat, respectively.
