= Kingdom of Marwar =

Kingdom in Rajasthan, India (1226–1581, 1583–1947)

Coordinates: 26°28′N 73°02′E

Kingdom of Marwar Jodhpur State
- 1226–1581; 1583–1947
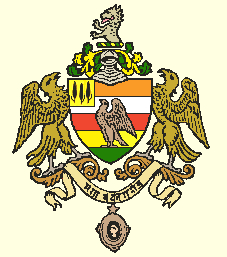
- Flag Coat of arms

- The Kingdom of Marwar at its greatest extent c.. 1539, under Maldeo Rathore
- Status: Sovereign monarchy (1226–1428; 1458-1508; 1527-1581; 1710–1790); Vassal state of the Kingdom of Mewar (1428–1458; 1508-1527); Vassal state of the Mughal Empire (1581–1710); Princely state of the British East India Company (1818–1858) and India (1858–1947)
- Capital: [[Pali, Rajasthan|Pali]] (1243–1395); Mandore (1395–1459); Jodhpur (1459-1947)
- Common languages: Marwari
- Religion: Hinduism (official)
- Government: Monarchy
- Maharaja
  - 1226–1273: Rao Siha (first)
  - 1947–1949: Hanwant Singh (last)
- History
  - Establishment: 1226
  - Annexed by the Mughal Empire: 1581
  - Restored as a vassal state: 1583
  - Rathore rebellion: 1679–1707
  - British protection: 1818
  - Acceded to the Dominion of India: 1947

Area
- 1947: 93,424 km^{2} (36,071 sq mi)
Preceded by
Guhila dynasty
Pratiharas of Mandavyapura
Delhi Sultanate
Succeeded by
Rajputana Agency
Dominion of India
- Today part of: Rajasthan, Republic of India

Kingdom of Marwar, also known as Jodhpur State during the modern era, was a kingdom in the Marwar region from 1243 to 1818 and a princely state under British rule from 1818 to 1947. It was established in Pali by Rao Siha, possibly a migrant Gahadavala noble, in 1243. His successors continued to struggle against regional powers for domination and 9 out of 15 rulers till 1438 died in combat. In 1395, its capital was changed to Mandore by Rao Chunda of Mandore and to Jodhpur in 1459 by Rao Jodha. The kingdom was established and ruled by Rathore clan of Rajputs.

Marwar struggled and resisted against the Mughals under the rule of Rao Ganga and Maldeo Rathore who is known to be one of the greatest warriors of the time. The kingdom remained independent until it was annexed by the Mughal Empire in 1581 after the death of Chandrasen Rathore. It remained under direct Mughal control until Udai Singh was restored to the throne as a vassal and given the title of Raja in 1583. During the late 17th century it was under the strict control of the Mughal Emperor Aurangzeb, but the ruling house of Rathore was allowed to remain semi-autonomous in their territory.

Marwar came into a long period of dispute and war with the Mughals when Raja Jaswant Singh died in 1678 and was supposed to be succeeded by his posthumous-born son Ajit Singh but Ajit was not appointed the ruler by Aurangzeb. During this time Durgadas Rathore struggled to preserve the Rathore dynasty and freed Marwar from the Mughal Empire after 31 years of war.

The British had no role in the state's affairs until 6 January 1818, when the Raja at that time, Man Singh, entered into a subsidiary alliance, after which the Rajas of Marwar (or Jodhpur) continued as rulers of a princely state. During the Indian Rebellion of 1857, the Rajput Nobles under Thakur Kushal Singh of Auwa led a rebellion against Maharaja Takht Singh and the British, however the rebellion was put to an end by the British armies under Colonel Holmes after a siege of the Thakur's fort in Auwa. The armies of Jodhpur State fought in World War I for the British. They actively fought in Afghanistan and the Middle-east and scored a series of victories for the British empire. The Jodhpur lancers with the support of the Mysore lancers defeated a large host of Turks and Germans in the Battle of Haifa (1918). Some of the other battles they participated in were the battles of Suez, Gaza, Jordan Valley, Abu Tellul and Megiddo.

Following Indian independence in 1947 Maharaja Hanwant Singh, the last ruler of Jodhpur state signed the Instrument of Accession on 11 August 1947 and merged his state in the Union of India.

== Geography ==
Covering an area of 93,424 km^{2} (36,071 sq mi), Jodhpur State was the largest state under the Rajputana Agency and the third largest state in British India, after Jammu and Kashmir State and Hyderabad State. The state's revenue was 5 crores during its peak; however, it halved due to decline by the time of Maharaja Bijai Singh. The average revenue of the state during the British era was Rs.56,00,000 in 1901. The Maharaja's of Jodhpur originally had a gun salute of 19 guns with 21 personal. However the gun salute was reduced to 17 guns and 19 personal in 1870, due to a quarrel with the Maharana of Udaipur.

== History ==
=== Origin ===
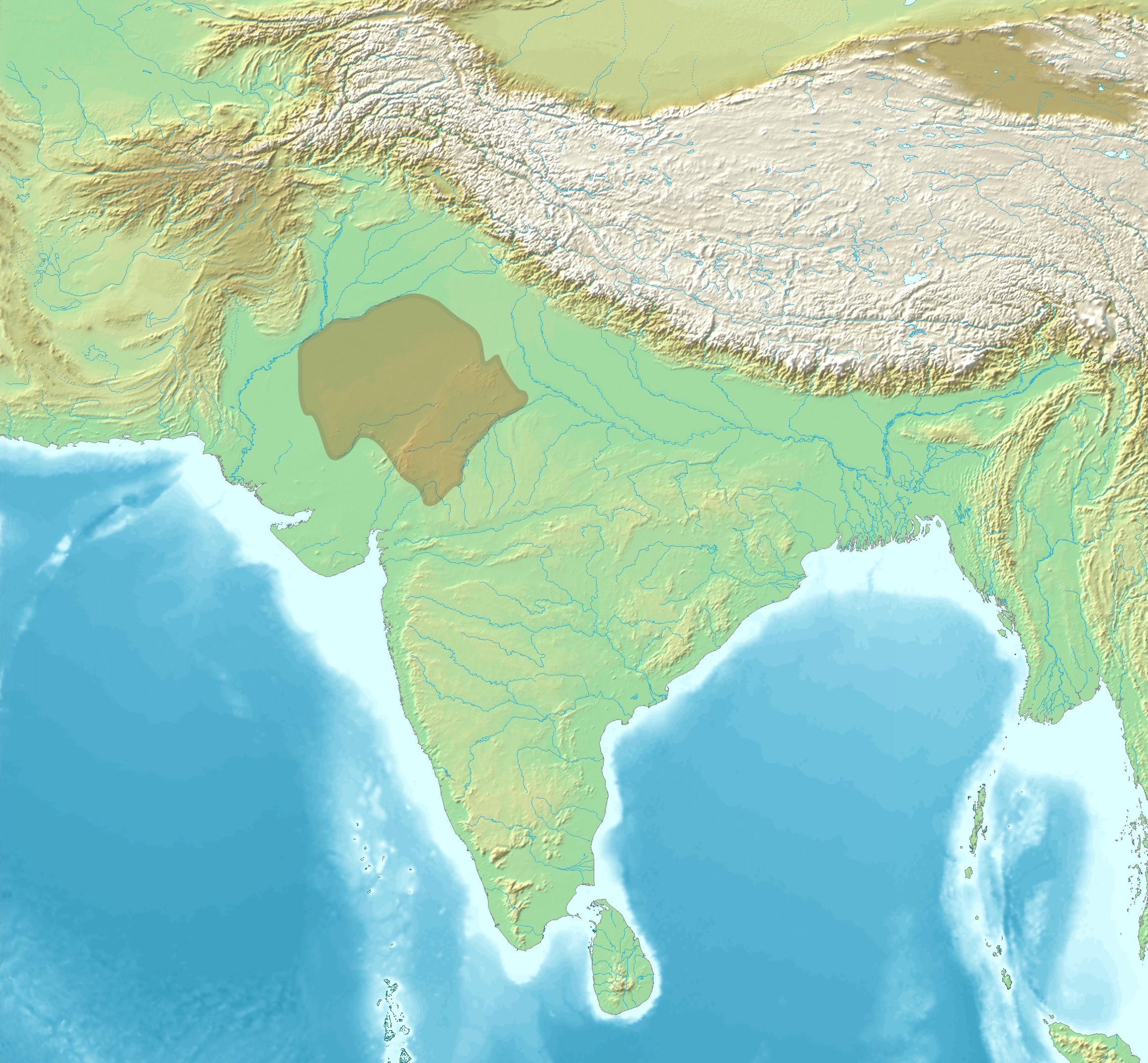
Location of Marwar within Rajputana circa 1525, with neighbouring Politics.

Recent genealogists believe that the Rathores are connected to the Gahadavala dynasty of Kannauj. A connection is often established between Rajput ruler Jaichand and the Rathores. Jaichand was later defeated by Muhammad of Ghor in the Battle of Chandawar. The one branch of the defeated rulers of Kannauj migrated westwards into Rajputana and were invited to settle in Pali, Rajasthan|Pali. Siha is regarded as the first emigrant in the region to establish his kingdom in Pali in 1243 when he helped the locals drive away the Meds and Meenas and assumed the title of Rao. He died fighting an invading Muslim force in 1273. In this invasion large amounts of Brahmins in the region were massacred.
Siha's son Rao Asthana captured Khed from the Guhilas and Idar from the Bhils. He died fighting a force of Jalaluddin Khilji in 1291 and was succeeded by his son Dhuhar. Dhuhar captured Mandore from the Pariharas but lost it later.

Dhuhar's son Raipal (r.1309-1313) and grandson Karanpal followed by Karanpal's son Bhim who continued to fight the Kingdom of Malwa and the Turkic invaders. Karanpal's son Jhalansi defeated the Sodha Rajputs, and the ruler of Multan but died fighting the Turks in 1328. His son Chhada defeated the Sodha's, the ruler of Jaisalmer, Nagaur and Jalore. He died fighting the Songaras in 1344. Chhada's son Rao Tida avenged his father's death by defeating the Songara's. Tida was succeeded by his son Tribhuvan and his grandson Mallinath. Mallinath fought with the Songaras, Deoras, Bhatis and the Tughluqs.

=== Rao Chunda ===
In 1384, Mallinath's nephew Chunda gained the title of Rao and became the ruler. Chunda married in a Parihar Rajput clan from which he received the city of Mandore as Dowry. He shifted his capital to that city in 1395. In 1396, Zaffar Khan of Gujarat laid siege to Mandore but was repelled by Chunda. Chunda and Zaffar entered into a tribute with Zaffar but Chunda later counter-attacked Zaffar and captured Sambhar and Ajmer. Chunda's aggressive policy earned him enmity with his neignbours, namely Bhati Rao of Pugal, the Sankhlas of Janglu and the governor of Multan, Khidar Khan. These collectively invaded Nagaur. Chunda died defending Nagaur in 1428.

=== Ranmal ===
Towards the end of his life, he promised his throne to his younger son Kanha which angered his eldest son Ranmal who sought refuge in Mewar. Ranmals sister Hansa Bai had been married to Rana Lakha of Mewar so he was able to become a powerful member of the Mewar court. Karan died soon in the same year and Ranmal was able to gain the throne of Marwar. Ranmal attacked Bhati, Pugal and Jalore chiefs in his 10 year reign. Ranmal was called to help rule Mewar in 1433 when his sister Hansa Bai's son Mokal was assassinated. He helped rule the kingdom but his power was not received well by the Sisodia clan. Rana Kumbha, son of Mokal, got him assassinated in 1438.

=== Rao Jodha ===
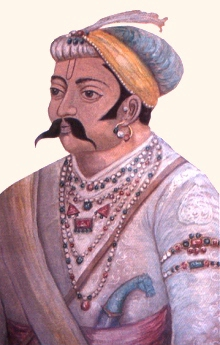
Jodha of Mandore, one of the greatest Rathores

After Ranmal's assassination, Mewar and Marwar's relations had gotten bitter and Ranmal's son Rao Jodha escaped Mewar and reached its borders. From there he started building his own power. He recollected allies and defeated his enemies one by one and consolidated power and by 1453, he was able to regain Mandore. To end this enmity, Kumbha and Jodha reached settlements and matrimonial alliance was established by marrying Jodha's daughter Shringar Devi to Kumbha's son Raimal in 1459. It was after this that Marwar was able to become a prosperous kingdom under the rule of Rao Jodha. Out of the 15 rulers that preceded Jodha, nine died on the battlefield, six of them against foreign armies. Jodha's son himself died after a battle in which he saved 140 women from Afghan raiders.

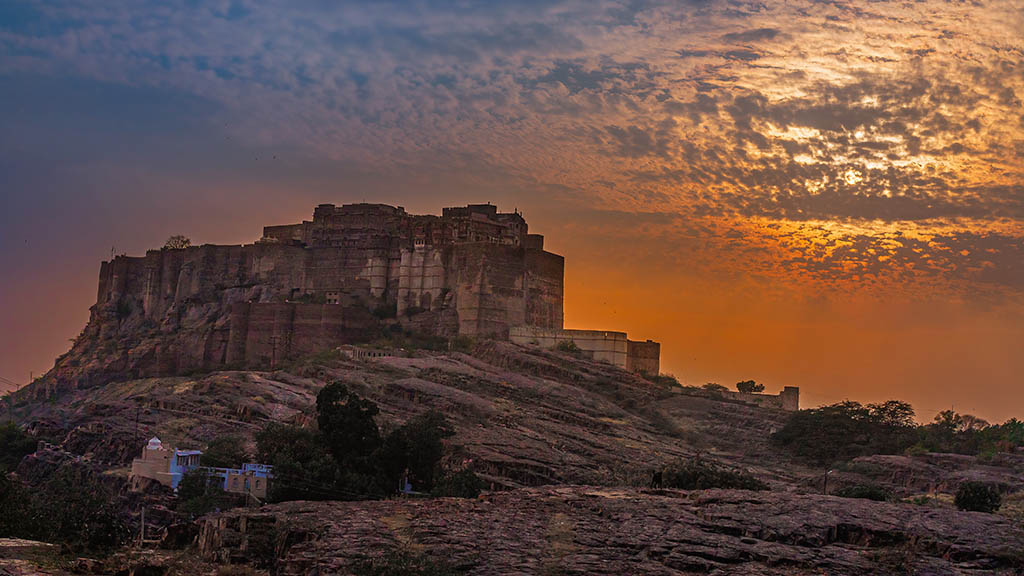
Mehrangarh Fort, the capital of Marwar for centuries

After restoring peace, Jodha constructed a new capital fort on a hilltop 6 miles south of Mandore named Mehrangarh. The city came to be known by his name. Thus the city of Jodhpur was settled. Soon, he expanded his territory greatly. One of his sons, Bika captured Janglu which he named Bikaner after himself and became its Rao.

He died in 1489 and was succeeded by his son Rao Satal who died in 1492 who was succeeded by Jodha's second son, Rao Suja. Suja's younger brother Bika laid siege to Jodhpur, demanding a separate kingdom in Bikaner, and in the ensuing negotiations, Bikaner was given to Bika as his independent kingdom. Suja outlived his eldest son Bagha and died in 1515 and was succeeded by his grandson Rao Ganga in 1515.

During the rule of Jodha's sons, many chiefs asserted their independence. This led to formations of factions which favored different candidates for succession. When Rao Ganga ascended to the throne, this factionalism led to a civil war like situation because the succession was disputed by another candidate called Biram Deo. Soon after Ganga's accession, Biram was expelled from Jodhpur. To avenge this, Biram started looting Jodhpur. Eventually, with the help of his son Maldeo, Ganga was able to defeat Biram.

=== Maldeo Rathore ===
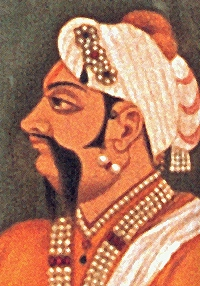
Rao Maldev Rathore of Marwar

Seeing Rana Sanga's success, Ganga decided to align Marwar with Mewar and assisted Sanga in war against Sultan of Gujarat in 1517, and Battle of Bayana in 1527 and the Battle of Khanwa in 1527 against Babur. His son Maldeo Rathore participated in the battle and later escorted an unconscious Rana Sanga from the battleground after defeat. After Sanga's death, Maldeo wanted to fill the vacuum of power in Rajputana and felt that his regnant father couldn't fill it. Ganga mysteriously died in 1531 after falling from his balcony. This fall could've been an accident but is believed that was an assassination by Maldeo.

==== Expansion ====
Under Maldeo Rathore, Marwar rose to great power. He was regarded as a great and fearless warrior. According to Ferishta, He was the most potent prince of Hindustan. In 1531, when Bahadur Shah of Gujarat invaded Mewar, Maldeo assisted Rana Vikramaditya. In 1534-35, Maldeo was able to capture Ajmer and Nagaur.

During Maldeo's territorial expansion, Raja of Jaisalmer sued for peace and offered his daughter Umade for marriage. He attacked Jalore in 1538 and took it. Its ruler was imprisoned where he died a few years later. During his rule, Marwar captured a large part of western Rajputana.

He continued his father's policy towards the Kingdom of Mewar by helping its legitimate heir Udai Singh II in taking the throne back from the usurper Banvir. He invaded Bikaner, ruled by a branch of the same family and annexed it in 1542.

==== Humayun and Sher Shah Suri ====
In 1540, Maldeo helped Mughal Emperor Humayun against Sher Shah Suri by providing him 20,000 troops at Bhakkar. There are many reasons about why he provided this assistance including increasing the sphere of influence or avenging shelter given to fugitives in Sher Shah's court. Eventually, an expelled Humayun reached Phalodi, in Marwar, to seek assistance from Maldeo but couldn't secure much help from the Raja. Following a half hearted welcome for Humayun by Maldeo, Sher Shah marched down to Phalodi and asked Maldeo for handing over Humayun, who escaped to Amarkot.

Following Humayun's escape, Sher Shah returned to Delhi and consolidated power. He later planned to invade Maldeo because he was very ambitious. When Sher Shah reached Marwar, he devised a deceptive plan. He dropped several letters addressed to Marwari soldiers asking them to defect to Delhi. This made Maldeo suspect them and order them to retreat. A few thousand soldiers still held frontier who met Sher Shah Suri at the Battle of Sammel. Sher Shah won the battle and further pursued Marwar. Jodhpur was occupied for several months, but was retaken by Maldeo in 1545.

==== Continued expansion ====
In 1550, Maldeo invaded Pokhran and Phalodi and took it over from its chiefs.In 1556, Haji Khan, an ally of Rana Udai Singh of Mewar, sought help from Maldeo to invade Mewar after differences arose between Udai and Haji. In the Battle of Harmada in 1557, Udai Singh was defeated and the territory of Merta was captured by Maldeo.

==== Akbar ====
Akbar succeeded Humayun in 1556, many Rajput chiefs mustered around him with their grievances against the Rathore Chief of Jodhpur. Akbar used this as a casus belli against Maldeo. The Mughals conquered Ajmer and Nagaur in 1557 and soon after Akbar captured Jaitaran and Parbatsar. However the Mughals failed to capture the core territories of Marwar. Maldeo before his death held the districts of Jodhpur, Sojat, Jaitaran, Phalodi, Siwana, Pokhran, Jalore, Sanchore, Merta, Barmer, Kotra and some parts of Jaisalmer. These territories were later captured by Akbar due to the succession war between Maldeo's sons.

Maldeo Rathore died on 7 November 1562.

=== Rao Chandrasen ===
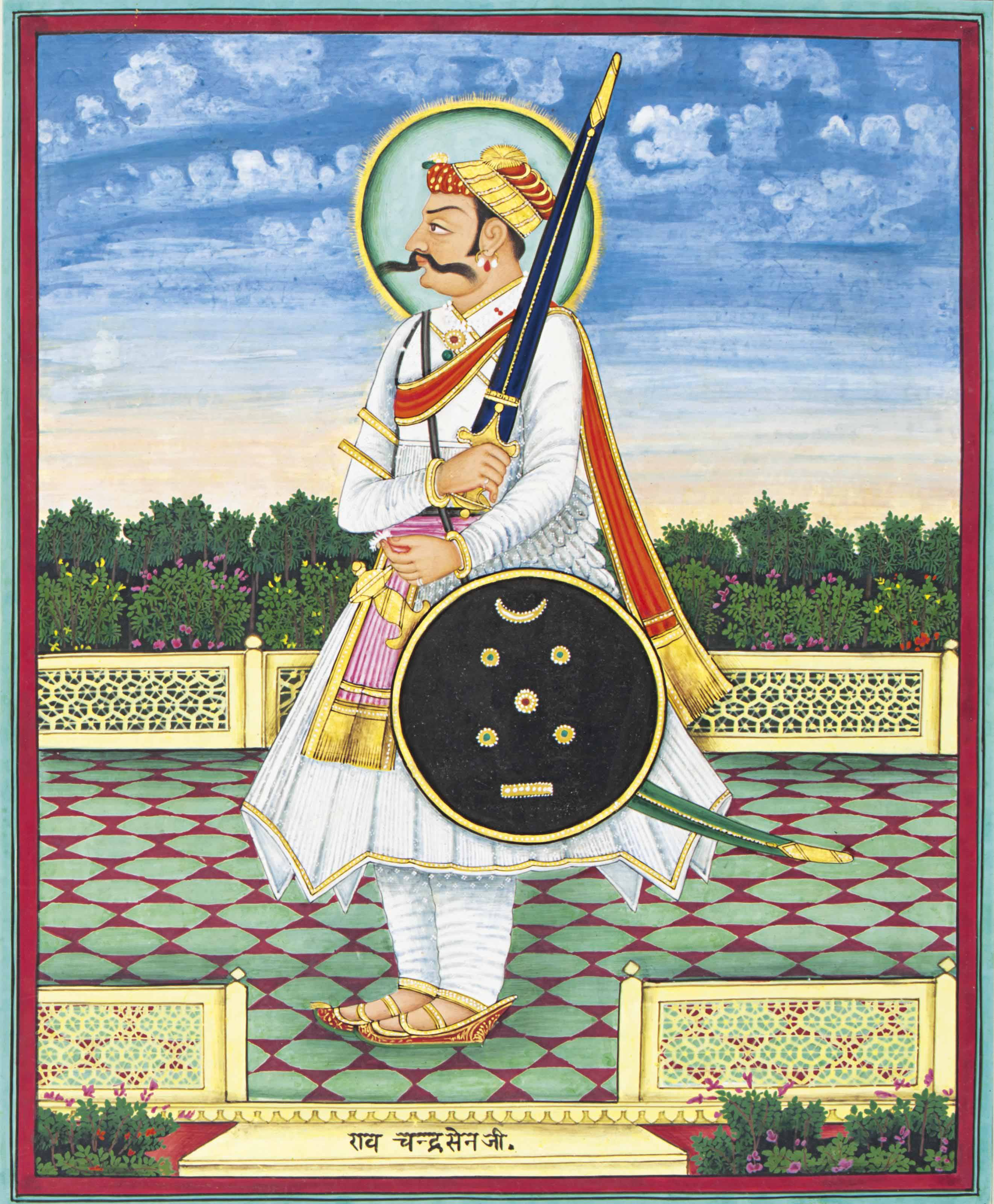
Rao Chandrasen of Marwar, the last independent ruler of Marwar

After the death of Maldeo, according to his will, his third son Chandrasen Rathore was crowned the Rao. But is first and second son Ram and Udai started a war of succession for the throne. They were defeated by Chandrasen by 1563. After the war of succession, Chadrasen did not accept the suzerainty of Akbar and hence Mughal army invaded Jodhpur and occupied it because of which Chandrasen shifted his capital to Bhadrajun.

While Chandrasen continued to defend his kingdom from the Mughal invasions, his neighbor Rana Pratap of Mewar fought a war with mughals in the Battle of Haldighati in 1576 which made a heavy loss to both the mewar and mughals. After the battle of Haldighati, Mughals turned their attention to Marwar and invaded in the same year. Chandrasen was dislodged from Bhadrajun and became a wanderer for the next 5 years with no capital, throne or shelter. He made several attempts to regain his kingdom, which included several raids on the imperial forces. Although his efforts went in vain and he died in 1581.

=== As a Mughal state ===
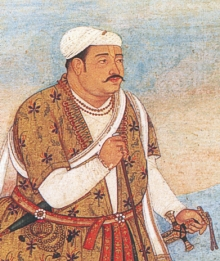
Udai Singh also known as Mota Raja. He was placed on the throne after the kingdom being captured by Akbar

In 1583, Akbar formally recognized Chandrasen's rival brother Udai Singh as the ruler of Marwar as a Mughal state. This new ruler of Marwar recognized Akbar's supremacy readily as he was under him since 1570. Udai also contributed to Akbar's imperial force in the invasions of Sirohi. A matrimonial alliance was established between Mughals and Marwar in 1586 when Udai Singh's daughter Manvati bai was married to Jahangir. In 1592, Akbar tasked Udai to take care of the administrative affairs of his capital Lahore while he led conquest in Kashmir. Udai Singh died in Lahore in 1595.

Udai was succeeded by his son Sur Singh in 1595. Because of his military abilities, he was given the title Sawai Raja. In 1596, he was also given the control of Gujarat. In 1599, he was sent to assist Daniyal Mirza in the conquest of the Deccan for Emperor Akbar. In 1604 on the request of Daniyal Mirza, he was allowed to return to Jodhpur and was granted Jaitaran and western half of Merta pargana. During Udai and his son Sur's rule, their pradhan (prima minister) Govind Das Bhati reformed the Marwari administrative system and made it similar to the Mughal system. In 1613, he was deputed by the Mughal emperor along with Prince Khurram (son of Manvati Bai) to undertake the expedition of Mewar. Sur Singh died in 1619 and was succeeded by his son Gaj Singh.

The Mughal emperor was impressed by the military capabilities of Gaj Singh and Gaj helped the Mughal empire subdue Malik Ambar, Nizam ul Mulk and Khan i Jahan Lodhi. Gaj also helped Jahangir quell the rebellion led by his rebellious son Prince Khurram who would later become Shah Jahan. He died in 1638 and the throne passed to his second son, Jaswant. Jaswant was just 12 years old when he ascended to the throne and his decisions were heavily influenced by Shah Jahan. Jaswant accompanied Shah Jahan and his son Aurangzeb on many of his expeditions. He was able to get rid of the Bhatis of Jaisalmer in 1650.

==== War of succession of Shah Jahan ====
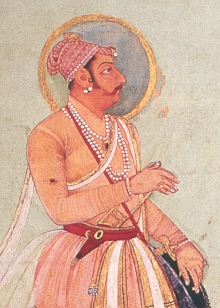
Jaswant Singh, the ruler during Aurangzeb's reign

In 1657, when Shah Jahan fell ill and his sons Aurangzeb and Murad started a war of succession, Jaswant Singh led a united Mughal front against the two princes. The two forces met at the Battle of Dharmat in April 1658. During this battle, the Mughal commander Qasim Khan betrayed Jaswant Singh and did not participate in the battle completely causing Rajput casualties. The battle was lost and an injured Jaswant had to retreat. Following the defeat of Dara Shikoh at the Battle of Samugarh, Aurangzeb was crowned as the Mughal Emperor after which he pardoned Jaswant Singh for siding with Dara. In 1661, Aurangzeb ordered Jaswant to help his uncle Shaista Khan to fight against the Maratha leader Shivaji. In 1663, Jaswant captured the fort Kondana, weakening Shivaji. Jaswant died in 1678.

==== Succession crisis of Jaswant Singh ====
At the time of his death, Jaswant Singh had no living heirs, but soon, his wife gave birth to his son posthumously in February 1679. One of these heirs died but the second, Ajit Singh survived. Jaswant's family was moved to Delhi and Aurangzeb converted Marwar into a crown territory to govern it while it did not have a ruler. Aurangzeb didn't immediately crown Ajit Singh as the ruler and demanded him to be a grown adult first. Instead, a grand-nephew of Jaswant, Inder Singh Rathore was crowned by Aurangzeb. One of the ministers of Marwar, Durgadas Rathore along with a Rathore delegation rescued Ajit Singh and the Ranis in June 1679 and took them back to Sirohi where Ajit grew up in anonymity. Over the next few decades, the Mughals and Marwar kept engaging in guerilla warfare.

==== Durgadas and Ajit Rathore's struggle against Aurangzeb ====
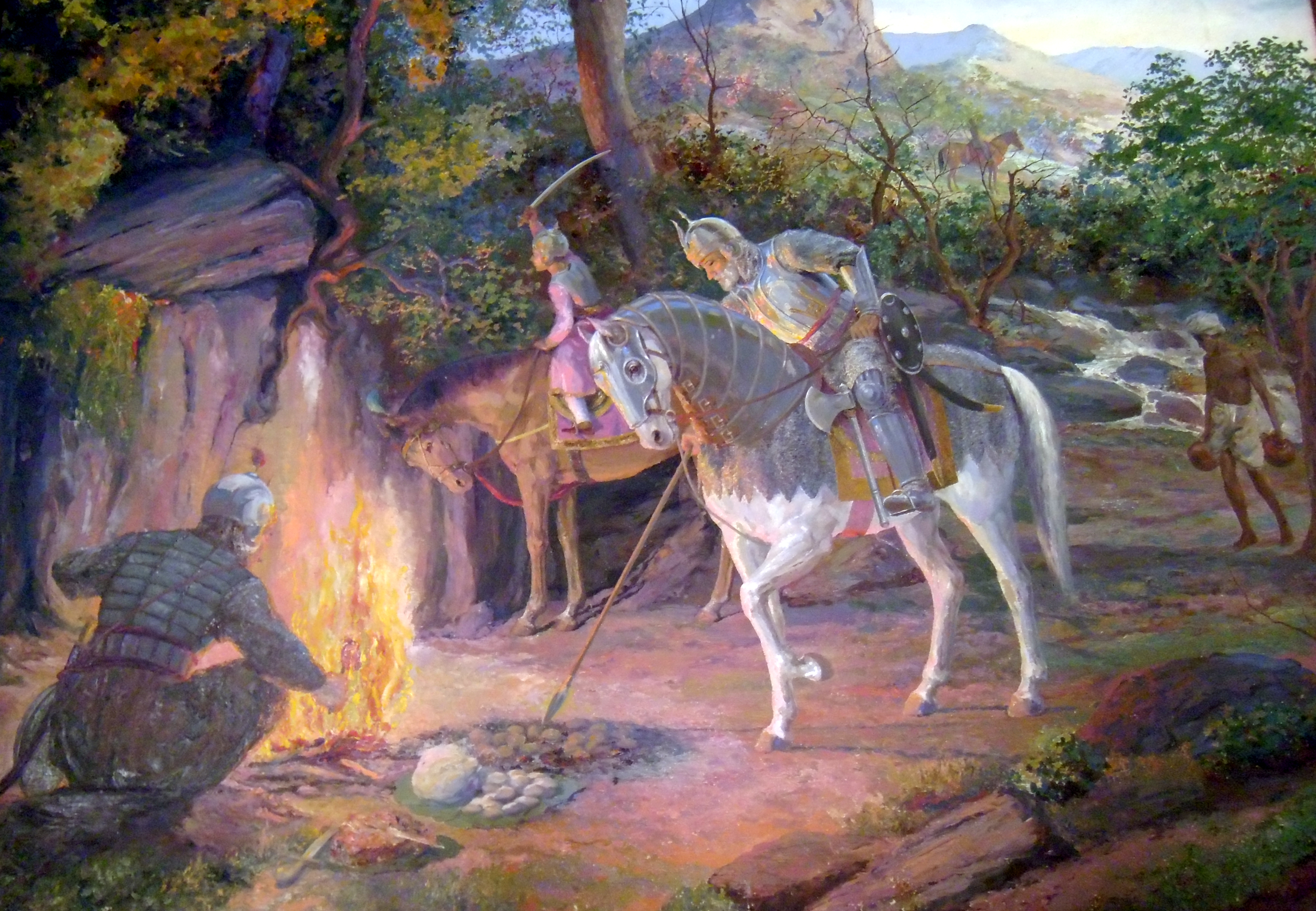
Durgadas Rathore's painting in Mehrangarh museum, the Rathore minister who rescued Ajit Singh and rallied for his cause

Marwar and Mewar joined hands to oppose Aurangzeb together but were defeated in the Battle of Debari in 1680. Aurangzeb sent his son Muhammad Akbar to capture Ajit but Akbar ended up rebelling against his father in 1681. Aurangzeb tried to prevent an alliance between the Rajputs and Akbar by planting fake letters between him and Akbar stating that the rebellion is a plot to lure the Rajputs. This worked and no major alliance formed between Marwar and Akbar. Later, to help Akbar, Durgadas took him to the court of Sambhaji. Durgadas was successfully able to distract Aurangzeb and from 1681 to 1687, he was able to recapture vast expanses of the Marwar territory back.

After 1687, Marwar and the Mughals got into negotiations to end the struggle. Ajit was married to the niece of Maharana Jai Singh to eliminate any doubt in the mind of Aurangzeb that Ajit could be an imposter and not the real son of Jaswant Singh. Truce did not last long and after Prince Azam took over in Gujarat he broke the conciliatory policies of his predecessor in 1702. Because of this, Ajit Singh couldn't return to Jodhpur till the death of Aurangzeb in 1707 after which they captured Jodhpur. Ajit Singh captured large parts of Marwar while Prince Muazzam ascended to the Mughal throne as Bahadur Shah I. Bahadur Shah invaded Marwar in 1708, defeated Ajit in the battle of Merta and took control of Marwar in February. In 1708, Ajit Singh of Marwar, Sawai Jai Singh and Maharana Amar Singh came signed a pact of alliance against Mughals and thus began the Rajput Rebellion of 1708. Ajit exiled Durgadas Rathore from Marwar to take complete control of Marwar and Durgadas died in Mewar in 1718.

==== The Rajput Rebellion ====
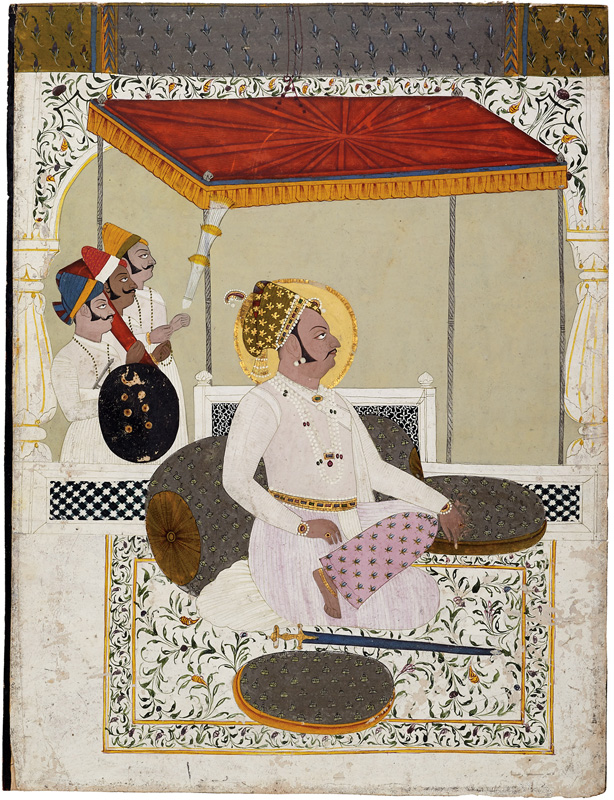
Ajit Singh, after Jaswant Singh's death, was taken care of by Durgadas Rathore and led a rebellion against the Mughals

Together, Maharana Amar Singh, Ajit Singh and Sawai Jai Singh marched upon Jodhpur in 1708 and expelled Mehrab Khan and placed Ajit Singh on the throne. Later the same year, the alliance marched on Amber and met the forces of Bahadur Shah I at Sambhar. The battle was won by the alliance and by October 1708, Jai Singh II was restored to his throne at Amber. Eventually Bahadur Shah accepted the demands of Ajit and Jai Singh and recognized them as the rulers of Jodhpur and Amber respectively in 1710 ending the rebellion.

After the war, Ajit Singh built good relations with the new Mughal Emperor Jahandar Shah who gave him higher privileges. When Farrukhsiyar ascended to the Mughal Throne, he sent Sayyid Husain Ali Khan to invade Marwar in 1714 for not accepting the position of governor of Thatta in Sindh. Ajit negotiated with Hussain and struck a peace deal according to which, his son and heir Abhay Singh will attend the Mughal court and his daughter will be married to Farrukhsiyar. Ajit Singh took his revenge in 1719. Ajit Singh besieged the Red Fort, entered the palace grounds, stabbed Qutb-ul-Mulk and arrested Farrukhsiyar. The emperor was dragged to a small room in Tripoliya gate, where he was tortured and blinded with a needle. On 2 March 1719, Rafi-Ud-Darjat was placed on the throne by Ajit Singh and Jai Singh.

==== Post rebellion ====
After Rafi-ud-Darjat's abdication and Rafi-ud-Daulah's premature death in the same year, Muhammad Shah ascended to the throne. Ajit had enough influence on him to get the privileges of subedar of Ajmer and governorship of Gujarat. Muhammad Shah didn't let himself be influenced by Ajit Singh, he deposed the Sayyid brothers in 1720 and then canceled the appointments of Ajit to Gujarat and Ajmer. When Ajit tried to rebel against this, he was defeated by Hyder Quli Khan. More than a dozen parganas were taken away from Ajit and he had to return to Jodhpur in 1723. Ajit's son, Abhay remained under the influence of Jai Singh II who hadn't lost his prominence in the court after the deposition of the Sayyid brothers. Jai Singh instigated Abhay to get rid of Ajit who ordered his younger brother Bakhat Singh to assassinate Ajit. On 23 June 1724, Bakhat Singh entered the palace of his father and murdered him. Ajit Singh died at the age of 45 and his son Abhay was enthroned as Maharaja Abhay Singh. More than sixty women committed Sati on the funeral pyre of Ajit Singh.

=== After Mughal decline ===
In 1739, Abhay decided to invade Bikaner, but his brother Bakhat Singh decided to side with the Bikaneri Maharaja Zorawar Singh. Bakhat Singh requested for support from Sawai Jai Singh, who marched for his cause in 1740. Eventually, the Rana of Mewar had to intervene and get a treaty signed between the two states which also included a clause of war reparations to Jaipur. In 1739, Nader Shah invaded the Mughal empire and sacked Delhi. Not a single Rajput ruler came to the defense of Muhammad Shah and his calls for mobilisation were ignored.

After the treaty, Abhay and Bakhat Singh united again and this time led a front against Jaipur in June 1741. The forces of Marwar and Amber met at the Battle of Gangwana. This battle was fought with heavy casualties on both sides but eventually Bakhat Singh had to retreat because he was heavily wounded with a bullet and an Arrow. The Mughal emperor granted Idar to Abhay who gave it to his rebellious brother Anand Singh. Before dying in 1749, Abhay made an unsuccessful attempt at invading Bikaner and established good relations with the Holkars.

=== Maratha Interference ===
==== Succession crisis of Abhay Singh ====
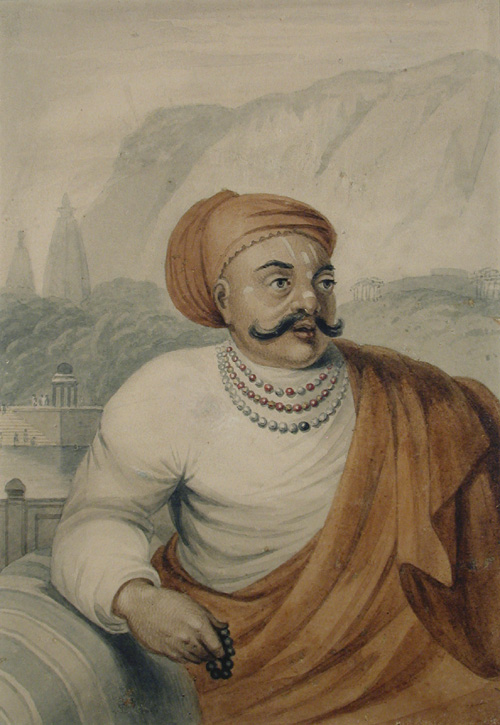
Mahadaji Shinde attacked Marwar several times in late 18th century

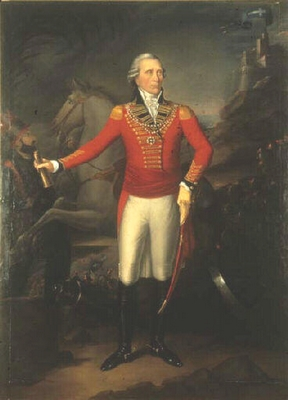
Benoît de Boigne, a French general who was known for his army's professionalism and efficiency, was the leading general of the Scindia Army.

Abhay was succeeded by his son Ram Singh but soon, his position was disputed by his uncle Bakhat Singh. This dispute attracted external parties to intervene. Gaj Singh of Bikaner sided with Bakhat while Ishwari Singh of Jaipur sided with Ram Singh. In 1751, Ram Singh was defeated by Bakhat Singh at the Battle of Luniawas and Bakhat was crowned the maharaja. Ram Singh sought help from the Marathas and Jayappa Scindia soon came to help him. They encamped in Ajmer but soon Bakhat Singh launched an army towards Ajmer so it was abandoned. Before any tangible result could play out, Bakhat Singh died in 1752. His son Bijay Singh could only remain on the throne for a year and was deposed by Ram Singh assisted by Jayappa Scindia. In 1755, Bijay Singh got Jayappa assassinated in Nagaur who was succeeded by Jankoji Rao Scindia.

Jankoji partitioned the kingdom giving the Jodhpur portion to Bijay Singh and the Jalore portion to Ram Singh. Marwar remained neutral during the Third Battle of Panipat in 1761 and Bijay was able to use the distracted Marathas to expel Ram Singh from the Jalore portion of Marwar and was able to gain full control. Ram Singh ran away to Jaipur where he died in 1772.

After Ram Singh's death, Marwar saw a period of revival under Bijay Singh. Bijay Singh became the first Rathore ruler to mint his own currency with the permission of the Mughal ruler Shah Alam II in 1781. In 1787, Mahadji Scindia marched against Jaipur and Jaipur joined forced with Jodhpur to fight the Battle of Lalsot in the town of Tunga. The professionalism of the Scindia forces under French commander Benoit de Boigne couldn't match the valor of the Rajput troops who forced them to retreat and Bijay captured Ajmer. de Boigne came back to Marwar and this time, Bijay's army faced two heavy defeats at the Battle of Patan and Mertia in 1790 and Marwar had to cede a lot of territory to the Marathas. In 1793, Bijay Singh died and his eldest grandson Bhim Singh took over the throne. Other contenders to the throne were either expelled, blinded or killed except Man Singh. Dhananajaya Singh describes his succession as an orgy of murder. Throughout his reign, Bhim tried to capture his cousin Man Singh but failed multiple times. He died before he could capture his cousin in 1803 and Man Singh was the only remaining heir, so he was crowned the Raja in 1804.

==== War over Krishna Kumari ====
Bhim Singh had been engaged to the Mewar princess Krishna Kumari since an early age but died before he could married her. So Maharana Bhim Singh decided to marry her to Sawai Jagat Singh of Jaipur. Successor of Bhim Singh of Marwar, Man Singh insisted that Krishna be married to him and got Daulat Rao Scindia to mediate the issue. Eventually, Daulat Rao pulled out and the Rajputana broke into war over Krishna Kumari. Jagat Singh laid siege to Mehrangarh fort in 1807 but found no success and had to retreat back to Jaipur because his own kingdom was being invaded by the Scindias. Amir Khan sided with Man Singh and suggested that either Krishna Kumari be married to Man Singh or be killed. He also attacked Udaipur and burned several villages. Bhim Singh of Mewar eventually decided that Krishna will be poisoned and she died of poisoning on 21 July 1810.

==== Spoils of Amir Khan Pindari ====
In 1808, Man Singh dispatched Indra Singh Sanghvi against Bikaner who defeated one force in Udasar but failed to take the Bikaner fort. A second force dispatched was also defeated and captured. Eventually, Maharaja of Bikaner reached a settlement with Marwar. Meanwhile, Amir Khan Pindari's raids into Jaipur territory forced Jagat Singh to reach settlement with Marwar as well, establishing another matrimonial alliance.

After the war over Krishna Kumari, Amir Khan became increasingly demanding and wanted to extract booty from Marwar for the help in the war. Ministers and other nobles in the Marwari court, worried of the influential position held by minister Indra Raj Sanghvi, convinced Amir Khan that his dues were pending due to Sanghvi who was assassinated by the Pindaris in 1815. Khan took advantage of a weak Marwar and extracted lakhs of rupees as bounty. The murder of Indra Raj Sanghvi led to a power struggle between his rival Mehta Akhey Chand and his brother Sanghvi Gul Raj. This eventually led to the murder of Gul Raj and Mehta Akhey convinced Man Singh to abdicate in favor is his heir Chattar Singh.

=== Under the British Empire ===
==== Treaty of 1818 ====
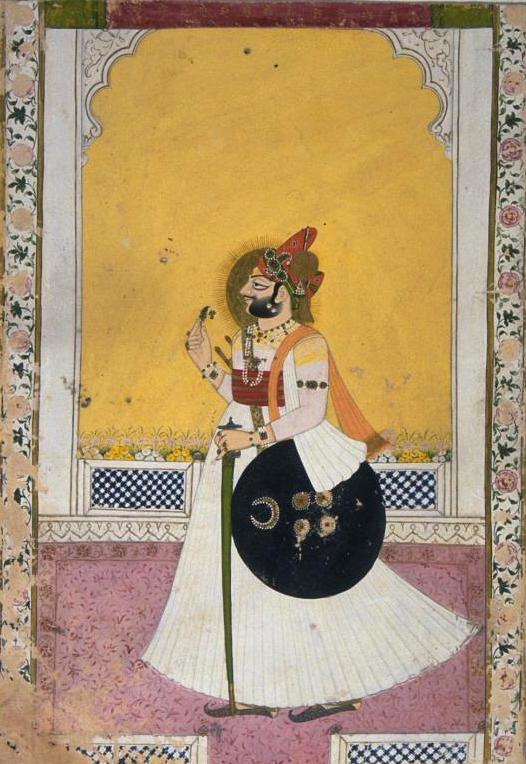
Man Singh I, who signed a treaty with the British EIC in 1818, and lost against the EIC in 1839, losing complete control of his kingdom to the British

The British East India Company made the first contacts with the Rajputana in 1803 when it defeated the Marathas in the Second Anglo-Maratha War. It had gained the control of the Maratha territory up to the Yamuna river and had also reached the doorstep of Rajputana and requested the Rajput rulers to be cooperative. They understood the importance of travel routes to Delhi, Agra and Mau which all went through the Rajput lands. After the EIC defeated Bharatpur in 1805, many Rajput states started looking up to the British as an entity that could take the place of the Mughals and provide protection.

During the Third Anglo-Maratha War, the British defeated Amir Khan at the Pindari war in 1817 and gave the possession of Tonk to him and made him its Nawab. Having dealt with Amir Khan, Man Singh signed a treaty with the British in 1818 with the following clause.

1. The British will protect the principality and territory of Jodhpur.
2. Man Singh will act in subordinate cooperation.
3. Marwar will not inter into any negotiations with any chief or state without the knowledge and sanction of the British Government.
4. To pay a tribute of 108,000 which was being paid to the Scindias.
5. and that Rathores were the absolute rulers of Marwar.

including other articles of the treaty. After the untimely death of Chattar Singh in 1818, Man Singh came out of his abdication and took control of his state affairs.

==== Invasion of 1839 ====
Man Singh's first affair in office this time was to round up the faction which caused the power struggle in the court during his inactivity, who invited Amir Khan Pindari and led to the assassination of Indra Raj Sanghvi. Mehta Akhey Chand was executed along with other members of the faction in 1820. Man Singh did not act subordinate in the next one decade committing acts like sheltering absconding rulers from the British and attacking neighboring states in violation of the British treaty and ignoring the Governor-General's requests. After being defeated at the Third Anglo-Maratha war, Mudhoji II Bhonsle asked for shelter in Marwar which was granted where he lived the rest of his life and died in 1840.

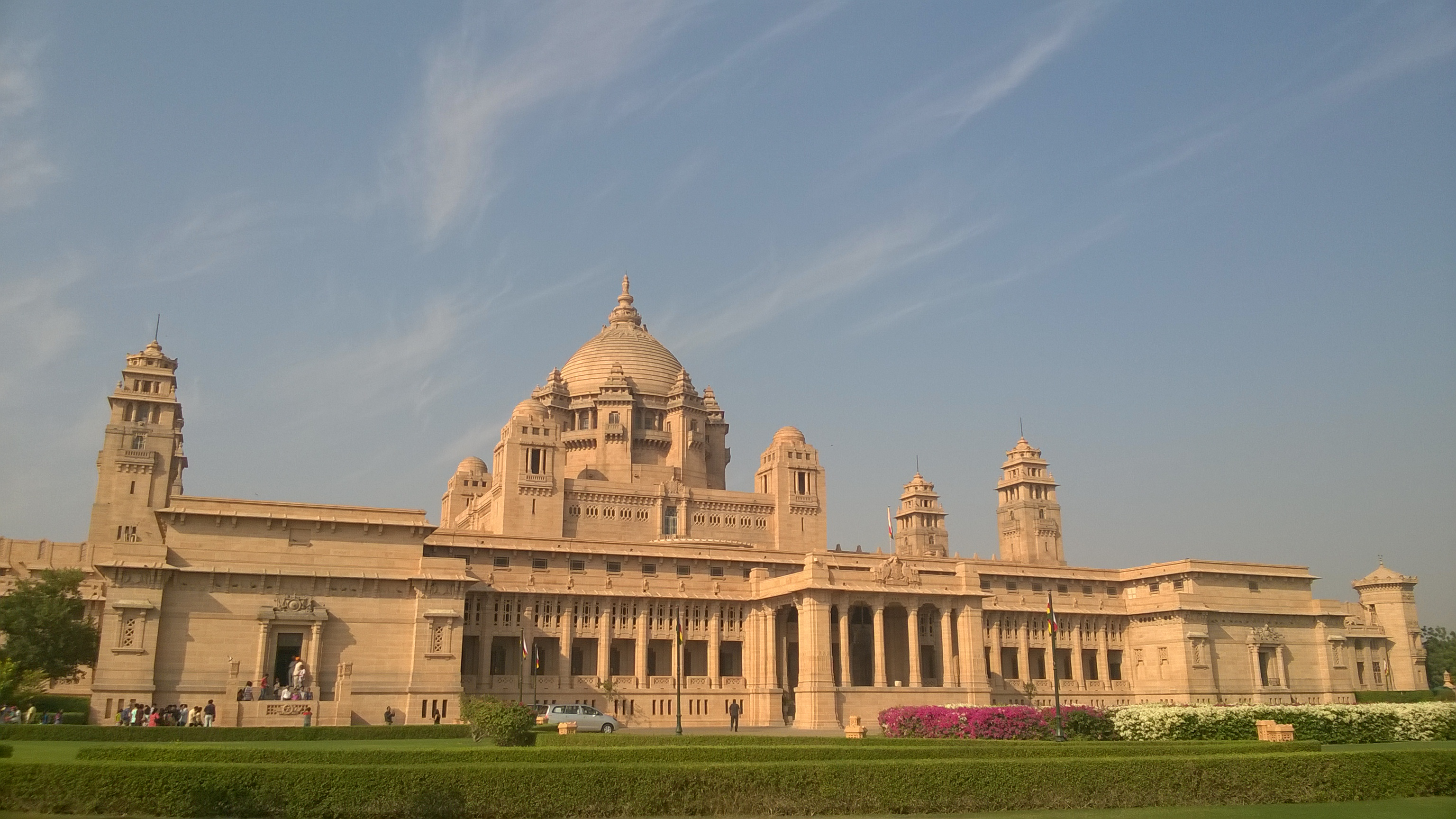
Umaid Bhawan Palace

Man Singh also refused to attend Lord William Bentinck's durbar at Ajmer in 1832, considered a more serious violation. Having had enough from Man Singh, the British decided to move against him in 1839, they invaded Marwar and captured Mehrangarh fort. Captain Ludlow was appointed as the Company's political agent to Marwar and the clause of the 1818 treaty stating the Maharaja being the absolute ruler was demolished and the British established permanent presence in Marwar. Man Singh retired from the job and died in 1843.

Man Singh's sons had predeceased him and on advice of his widows and other senior Rathores, the second cousin of the Raja of Idar and great-great-grandson of Maharaja Ajit Singh, Takht Singh was elected the successor of Man Singh and was invited to be crowned.

Over the next decades the seat of power in Marwar shifted from the Maharaja to the British Resident. By the end of the 19th century, he enjoyed executive, financial and judicial power. Several attempts of modernisation were made in this era. Diwani and Faujdari courts were established and judicial officers were brought in from other residencies. Infanticide and child trafficking was criminalised. Roads and an Astronomical observatory was constructed.

== Rulers of Marwar ==
The Rathore dynasty of Jodhpur are Rajputs claims ancestry from Rastrakuta dynasty Rashtrakutas some branches migrated north and formed their kingdom in Kannauj as Gahadavala dynasty and after the death of last emperor Jaichand in Battle of Chandwar his descendants migrated to Marwar and established Rathore dynasty

=== Rulers 1226–1438 CE (From Pali and Mandore) ===
Name		Notes	Reign began	Reign ended
1	Rao Siha	He conquered Pali and became the first rao of the Rathore dynasty in Marwar. He died in the battle of Lakha Jhawar (1273) against Ghaus ud-din Balban.	1226	1273
2	Rao Asthan	Conquered Khed from the Gohils and Idar from the Bhils. He died in battle against Sultan Jalal ud din Khilji. Both he and his brother Rao Sonag conquered Idar and began the Kingdom of Idar.	1273	1292
3	Rao Doohad	He conquered more than 140 villages. He was killed in battle against the Parihars.	1292	1309
4	Rao Raipal	He avenged his father by killing the ruler of the Parihars. During a famine in Marwar he distributed his own personal grains to the people.	1309	1313
5	Rao Kanhapal	He suffered raids from the Turko-Afghan tribes and was killed in action defending his lands.	1313	1323
6	Rao Jalansi	He defeated the SodhaParmars. He took the turban of the Sodha chief to mark his supremacy in the region.	1323	1328
7	Rao Chaddo		1328	1344
8	Rao Tida	He was killed in battle against the sultan of Delhi.	1344	1357
	Rao Kanhadev		1357	1374
	Rao Salkha		1374	?
9	Rao Vikramdev		?	1383
11	Rao Chunda	He successfully defended Mandore from the Turks in 1396. He further conquered the areas of Nagaur, Sambhar, Khatu, Nadol and Ajmer from the Tughlaq Empire. Was killed in battle against Khizr Khan of Multan.	1383	1428
12	Rao Kanha	Fought battles with his brothers. Died young in Mandore.	1428	1428
13	Rao Ranmal	He consolidated his rule with the help of the Sisodias of Mewar. He was later assassinated on the orders of Rana Kumbha of Mewar.	1428	1438

=== Rulers 1438–1949 CE (From Jodhpur) ===
Name		Notes	Reign began	Reign ended
1	Rao Jodha	Fought Rana Kumbha and reclaimed his lands. He later founded the city of Jodhpur and made it his capital. He subjugated the states of Jalore and Bundi and annexed Ajmer, Sambhar and Mohilavati.	12 May 1438	6 April 1489
2	Rao Satal	Died from wounds after saving 140 women from Afghan raiders.	6 April 1489	13 March 1492
3	Rao Suja		13 March 1492	2 October 1515
4	Rao Biram Singh	Grandson of Suj.	2 October 1515	8 November 1515
5	Rao Ganga	Assisted Rana Sanga in his campaigns against the Sultans of India.	8 November 1515	9 May 1532
6	Rao Maldeo	Successfully repelled the invasions of Sher Shah Suri. Called as one of the most potent rulers of Hindustan by Ferishta.	9 May 1532	7 November 1562
7	Rao Chandra Sen	He defended his kingdom for nearly two decades against relentless attacks from the Mughal Empire.	7 November 1562	11 January 1581
8	Raja Udai Singh Mota Raja	He became ruler of Jodhpur after death of Rao Chandrasen and was granted the title of Raja.	4 August 1583	11 July 1595
9	Sawai Raja Suraj Mal	Was granted the title of Sawai Raja in recognition of his many services.	11 July 1595	7 September 1619
10	Maharaja Gaj Singh I	The first to take the title Maharaja	7 September 1619	6 May 1638
11	Maharaja Jaswant Singh	He fought against Aurangzeb in the Battle of Dharmatpur.	6 May 1638	28 December 1678
12	Maharaja Ajit Singh	Became Maharaja of Marwar after 31 years of war with Aurangzeb. Durgadas Rathore played a key role in the war. Deposed Farukhsiyar with the help of the Sayyid brothers.	19 February 1679	24 June 1724
13	Raja Indra Singh	Installed in opposition to Maharaja Ajit Singh by Emperor Aurangzeb but unpopular with people of Marwar	9 June 1679	4 August 1679
14	Maharaja Abhai Singh	Defeated Sarbuland Khan and occupied all of Gujarat for a short time. He helped his brother Anand Singh to conquer Idar, in which the current Idar family traces descent to him.	24 June 1724	18 June 1749
15	Maharaja Ram Singh	First reign	18 June 1749	July 1751
16	Maharaja Bakht Singh	he was killed his father Ajit singh marwar. He was the general of the Marwari forces against Sarbuland Khan and defeated him in gujrat. In the Battle of Gangwana he was the ruler of Nagaur.and commander of 1,000 cavalry. He lost the battle. Because jodhpur force reinforcement not come to help against combined army of Kachwahas army and Mughal reinforcements .	July 1751	21 September 1752
17	Maharaja Vijay Singh	First reign	21 September 1752	31 January 1753
18	Maharaja Ram Singh	Second reign	31 January 1753	September 1772
19	Maharaja Vijay Singh	Second reign – Was defeated by Mahadji Scindia and forced to surrender the fort and city of Ajmer.	September 1772	17 July 1793
20	Maharaja Bhim Singh		17 July 1793	19 October 1803
21	Maharaja Man Singh	Entered into treaty relations with the British on 6 January 1818.	19 October 1803	4 September 1843
22	Maharaja Sir Takht Singh	Not in the direct line, but a great-great-great grandson of Ajit Singh. Formerly from Ahmednagar.	4 September 1843	13 February 1873
23	Maharaja Sir Jaswant Singh II	Kaisar-i-Hind	13 February 1873	11 October 1895
24	Maharaja Sir Sardar Singh	Colonel in the British Indian Army	11 October 1895	20 March 1911
25	Maharaja Sir Sumer Singh	Colonel in the British Indian Army	20 March 1911	3 October 1918
26	Maharaja Sir Umaid Singh	Lieutenant-General in the British Indian Army	3 October 1918	9 June 1947
27	Maharaja Sir Hanwant Singh	Ruler of Marwar (Jodhpur) until accession to the Union of India in 1949; died on 26 January 1952	9 June 1947	7 April 1949
28	(titular) Maharaja Gaj Singh II of Jodhpur	Became head of the House on 26 January 1952	26 January 1952	Present

== See also ==
- Marwar region
- Marwari horse
- Naubat Khan
- Kingdom of Mewar
- Kingdom of Jaipur
- Rajputana
- Political integration of India

== Bibliography ==
- Rima Hooja (2006). A history of Rajasthan. Rupa & Co. ISBN 9788129108906. OCLC 80362053.
- Visheshwar Sarup Bhargava (1966). Marwar And The Mughal Emperors (1526–1748).
- Dhananajaya Singh (1996). The House of Marwar : The Story of Jodhpur.
