= Rao Nara =

Indian prince who helped found Jodhpur in 1459

Rao Nara (Hindi: राव नरा), (born in c. 1420 and died 1487). Rao Nara was of Rathore lineage and the crown Prince of Nadol, the then small kingdom in northwest India in the 15th century. Nadol had been ruled by the Chauhans in the 11th to 14th centuries, but was taken over by the Rathores. His father was Rao Samra, the Raja (King) of Nadol. Rao Nara is significant in the history of India, as he plays a crucial role in the founding of Jodhpur, India in 1459 with Rao Jodha.

== Fall of Nadol ==
In 1438, Rao Ranmal was assassinated by the Rana of Mewar, Rana Kumbha. Rao Ranmal's son, Rao Jodha, with an army of 700 soldiers left but were pursued by Chunda and the Mewar forces. Skirmishes occurred as Rao Jodha fled up to Chittor. By the time, Rao Jodha had reached Bhilwara, only a handful of soldiers remained. As Rao Samra was related to Rao Ranmal with both originating from Mandore, Rao Samra allied with Rao Jodha. Rao Samra sent his son, Rao Nara and 50 soldiers with Rao Jodha as a means of escape, while Rao Samra confronted the Mewar forces. But Rao Samra could not hold off the forces and Nadol came under Mewar

== Control of Mandore ==
Rao Nara and Rao Jodha had reached Mandore to find it also had been under Rana Kumbha's control. From a small village close by, Rao Jodha and Rao Nara attacked the Mewar forces under surprise and took control of Mandore. They then went on to capture Chaukade, Sojat, Merta, Bahirunda, and Kosana.

== Founding of Jodhpur ==
In 1459, Rao Jodha and Rao Nara inaugurated Jodhpur by placing the foundation of Mehrangarh Fort on Bhaurcheeria Hill. Citing his valor, Rao Jodha honored Rao Nara by making him the Pradhan, as Rao Nara no longer had a kingdom to call his own. He made him a Jagirdar, as he gave him seven surrounding areas constituting a large jagir- Babar, Bisalpur, Dhundhra, Jajiwal, Mazal, Palasni, and Rohat. With much magisterial authority, his descendants (up to the independence of India) continued to be the official Jagirdars & Pradhans (also known as Diwans - see Diwan (title)) of Marwar.

== Jagirdars & Pradhans of Marwar ==
Jagirdar is a royal title in princely India. The titles: Jagirdar, Zamindar, and Deshmukh are similar to the European counterpart, Count or Duke, depending on the extent of the estate. A list of Rao Nara's direct descendants, the subsequent Jagirdars & Pradhans are noted below. Many were Marwar's illustrious military commanders also, including Jagirdars Bhawani, Sutaram, Daulatram, and Shivchand I.

- Rao Nara 1459-1487
- Jagirdar Natha 1487-1491
- Jagirdar Udai 1491-1515
- Jagirdar Goro 1515-1531
- Jagirdar Dhano 1562-1583
- Jagirdar Luno 1583-1594
- Jagirdar Mana 1594-1618
- Jagirdar Prithvi Raj 1618-1619
- Jagirdar Luna 1619-1624
- Jagirdar Raimal 1637-1658
- Jagirdar Tarachand 1658
- Jagirdar Vithaldas 1698-1704
- Jagirdar Khivsi 1704-1708
- Rao Raghunath† 1708-1728
- Jagirdar Amar Singh 1728-1744
- Jagirdar Girdhardas 1744-1748
- Jagirdar Manroop 1748-1749
- Jagirdar Sutaram 1749-1750
- Jagirdar Daulatram 1750-1751
- Jagirdar Sawairam 1751-1752
- Jagirdar Narsinghdas 1752-1790
- Jagirdar Bhawani 1790-1794
- Jagirdar Shivchand I 1794-1803
- Jagirdar Gangaram 1803-1833
- Jagirdar Lakshmichand 1833-1845
- Jagirdar Shivchand II 1845-1870
- Jagirdar Punamchand 1870-1900
- Jagirdar Sajjan Raj 1900-1930
- Jagirdar Budh Raj 1930-2011
- Jagirdar Vasant Kumar 2011-

†With Ajit Singh of Marwar in Delhi, Raghunath ruled Jodhpur as Maharaja in his name from 1713 to 1724

== Royal Titles and Indian Government ==
Following independence from the British in 1947, the jagirs were abolished in 1951. Then in 1971, with the addition of the 26th amendment to the Constitution of India, all official symbols of princely India, including titles, privileges, and remuneration (privy purses) were abolished. Thus, the title has no legal or official status by the Government of India. But the title, Jagirdar & Pradhan, much like Zamindar & Nawab, continue to carry unofficial weight and status.
