= Rao Doohad =

Rao of Marwar from 1291 to 1309

Rao of Marwar
- Reign: 1291–1309
- Predecessor: Rao Asthan
- Successor: Rao Raipal
- House: Rathore
- Father: Rao Asthan

Rao Dhoohad was an Indian chieftain belonging to the Rathore clan. Between 1291 and 1309 AD, he ruled a small principality in a part of the present-day Indian state of Rajasthan. Rao Dhoohad is said to have constructed the Nagnechiya Maa temple at the village of Nagana in Rajasthan.

== History ==
Doohad was a son of Rao Asthan, and inherited his father's estates in 1291 AD. Over the next few years, Doohad is said to have conquered 140 villages and added them to his principality. He ruled from the towns of Pali and Khed in present-day Rajasthan.

On one occasion, Doohad captured the nearby town of Mandore, which was at that time the capital of the Parihaar clan of rajputs. However, Mandore was soon retaken by the Parihaars. To expel them again, Rao Doohad mounted another offensive against Mandore. Somewhere between the villages of Thob and Tarsinghari, a skirmish ensued with the Parihaars. It was in this incident that Doohad was killed. This happened in the year 1309 AD.

Rao Doohad was the father of seven sons named Raipal, Kirtipal, Behad, Paithar, Joga, Dalu and Vegad.

Doohad was succeeded by Raipal, who donated grains to needy people during famine and thus became famous as Mahirelan (Indra).

== See also ==
- Rulers of Marwar
