= Rao Asthan =

Rao of Marwar from 1273 to 1291

Rao of Marwar
- Reign: 1273 – 15 April 1291
- Predecessor: Rao Sheoji
- Successor: Rao Doohad
- Died: 15 April 1291; Pali
- Issue: Rao Doohad; Rao Jopsa; Rao Dhandhul; Rao Hirnak; Rao Pohad; Rao Khipsa; Rao Aasal; Rao Chachig
- House: Rathore
- Father: Rao Sheoji

Rao Asthan (died 15 April 1291) was the second Rao of the Rathore clan from 1273 until his death in 1291. His father was Rao Sheoji and his mother was a Chavdi Rajputani.

== Reign ==
He conquered Khed from Guhilotes and consequently his descendants bore the patronymic Khedecha Rathores.

Rao Asthan killed Samaliya Koli of Idar and granted Idar to his younger brother Sonag. Songa's descendants are thus known as Idariya Rathore. Aja, Rao Asthan's another younger brother migrated near Dwarka, where he killed Bhojraj Chavda. Aja's descendants are known are Vadhels.

== Death ==
In 1291, Jalaluddin Khalji alias Feroze Shah II attacked Pali. Rao Asthan reached Pali from Khed and met Jalaluddin's army. He died fighting Jalaluddin's forces on 15 April 1291.

== Issue ==
Asthan had eight sons: Rao Doohad, Rao Jopsa, Rao Dhandhul, Rao Hirnak, Rao Pohad, Rao Khipsa, Rao Aasal and Rao Chachig. Rao Dhandhul took over control of Kolu. His son was Pabu Ji Rathore.

== See also ==
- Rulers of Marwar
