= Maldeo Rathore =

Rao of Marwar from 1532 to 1562

- Rao of Marwar
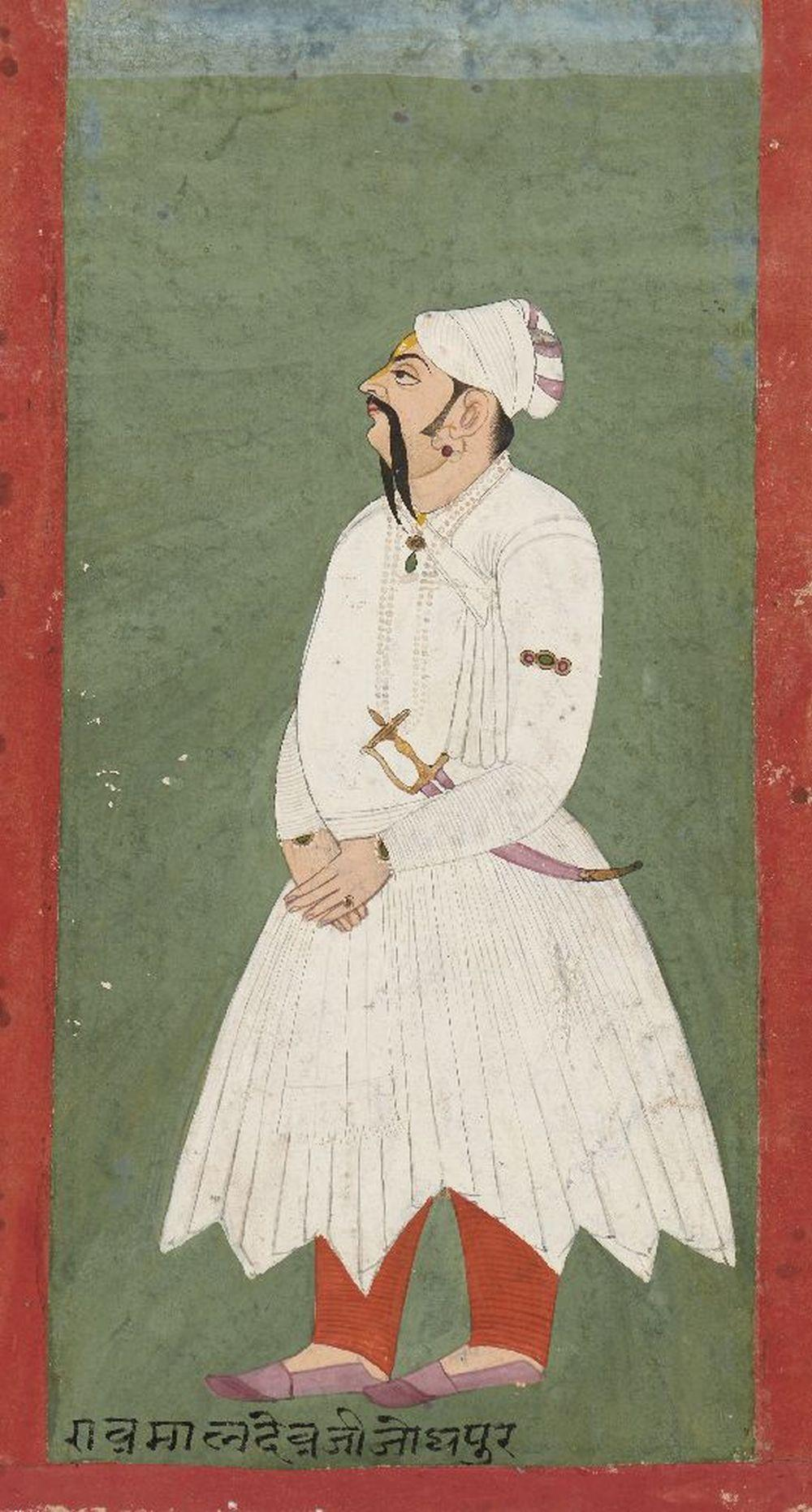
- Painting of Rao Maldeo Rathore

Rao of Marwar
- Tenure: 9 May 1532 – 7 November 1562
- Predecessor: Rao Ganga
- Successor: Rao Chandrasen Rathore
- Born: 5 December 1511; Jodhpur, Kingdom of Marwar
- Died: 7 November 1562 (aged 50); Mehrangarh Fort, Kingdom of Marwar
- Consort: Rani Jhali Swarupdeji
- Spouses: among others; Umade Bhattiyani; Rani Kachwahi Lachapdeji; Rani Jhali Hiradeji; Rani Sonagari Ladbai; Rani Jhali Narangdeji; Rani Kachwahi Sahodramji; Rani Hadi Rambhavatiji; Tivu Gudi
- Issue among others: Ramchandra; Kankavati Bai; Udai Singh; Chandrasen Rathore; Kunwar Man Singh Rathore; (Father of Raja Sarje Singh Rathore, King of Poonch); Raimal; Rukmavati Bai
- Dynasty: Rathore
- Father: Rao Ganga
- Mother: Padma Kumari Deora Chauhan
- Religion: Hinduism

Rao Maldeo Rathore (5 December 1511 – 7 November 1562) was a king of the Rathore dynasty, who ruled the kingdom of Marwar in present day state of Rajasthan. Maldeo ascended the throne in 1532, inheriting a small ancestral principality of Rathores but after a long period of military actions against his neighbours, Maldeo captured significant territories which included parts of present day Rajasthan, Haryana, Uttar Pradesh, Gujarat and Sindh. He refused to ally with either the Sur Empire or the Mughal Empire.

Maldeo's credential as a ruler were praised by several Persian chronicles of the time like Tabaqat-i-Akbarī by Nizamuddin Ahmad and Tārīkh-i Firishta by Firishta who both acknowledged him as the most powerful monarch in Hindustan.

== Early life ==
Maldeo was born on 5 December 1511 to Rao Ganga and Rani Padma Kumari. In 1532, he started his reign.

Maldeo had supported his father in several campaigns. At an early age he defeated the rebels of Sojat and humbled Rao Veeram Dev of Merta by defeating him in battle. Maldeo later led a 4,000 strong army and helped Rana Sanga in the siege of Bayana in February 1527 and a month later at Khanwa. He personally led the charge on the left wing of the Mughal army and after the Rajput confederacy's defeat, he carried the wounded and unconscious Rana out of the battlefield. In 1529 the Rathore rebel Shekha and Khanzada Daulat Khan of Nagaur attacked Jodhpur, however Rao Ganga and Maldeo defeated this army and killed Shekha.

After Maldeo's participations in campaigns with his father and Rana Sanga and establishing his credential as a future monarch, .

== Reign ==
=== Expansion of Marwar ===
The Kingdom of Marwar at its greatest extent c. 1539, under Maldeo Rathore

The rulers of Marwar once held sway over nine Rathore chieftains, however by the time Maldeo acceded to the throne, he ruled only two districts. Maldeo thus attacked these nine chieftains and changed Marwars stance of overlordship to absolute control. Maldeo also defeated the Sindhals of Raipur and Bhadrajun and fortified the two cities. In 1534 Maldeo attacked Nagaur and forced Daulat Khan to flee to Ajmer. Maldeo soon attacked Merta, Rian and Ajmer and captured them. The petty lords of Didwana and Pachpadra also acknowledged Maldeo's suzerainty. His attack on Jaisalmer was also successful and it brought the Bhatti rulers under his sway. In 1538 he defeated Mahecha Rathores and annexed Siwana and sent Bida Rathore to attack Jalore and captured Sultan Sikandar Khan. The Sultan was imprisoned and died after a short period in captivity. Maldeo, after capturing Jalore attacked and annexed Sanchore, Bhinmal, Radhanpur and Nabhara (In Gujarat). Maldeo's western territory at this time extended up to Sindh-Cholistan in the west and parts of Gujarat in the south-west. He had direct control over 40 districts in and around present day Rajasthan. In 1539 Maldeo took advantage of the war between the Mughals and the Sur Empire to conquer Bayana, Tonk and Toda.

By regaining territories from Afghan occupation, Maldeo Rathore restored Hindu rule in the area and abolished the Jizya tax there. His northern boundary at Jhajjar was only about fifty kilometers from Delhi.

According to Norman Ziegler, Marwar under Maldeo dominated the battles of his time period. This was due to the large number of horses that Maldeo supplied to his soldiers. Maldeo's father Rao Ganga had also created a regular cavalry force called "Chindhars", who were given a regular salary and were stationed in Sojat. Maldeo continued this tradition and greatly increased the number of Chindhars in his outposts.

According to Satish Chandra, "Maldeo's kingdom comprised of almost the whole of western and eastern Rajasthan including Sambhal and Narnaul (In Haryana). His armies could be seen as far as the outskirts of Agra. Chandra also says that, Maldeo had the mirage of reviving the 8th century Rashtrakuta empire. But unlike Prithviraj Chauhan and Rana Sanga Maldeo did not have the support of the Rajput tribes and politically no empire based in Rajasthan alone could challenge or defeat an empire that stretched from Punjab to the Upper Ganga valley." This was pointing towards Maldeo's hope of competing with the Mughal and Sur empires.

=== War with Nagaur ===
In 1534, Daulat Khan led an army and besieged Merta, which was then under Biram Dev Rathore. Maldeo took advantage of this situation to conquer Nagaur and force Daulat to flee to Ajmer.

=== War with Merta ===
Biram Dev of Merta had recently won Ajmer from the Gujarat Sultanate. Maldev demanded Ajmer by saying that Biram was too weak to hold Ajmer against Gujarat. Biram refused this request, resulting in Maldeo sending an army and conquering Ajmer from Biram dev.

=== War with Jaisalmer ===
Maldeo Rathore was expanding his territories westward and besieged Jaisalmer in 1537. Rawal Lunkaran was forced to sue for peace by giving Maldeo his daughter Umade Bhattiyani in marriage to him. Through this alliance Maldeo was able to secure his western borders and employ a large number of Bhati rajputs from Jaisalmer.

=== War with Jalore ===
After his campaign against Jaisalmer, Maldeo recruited a large number of Bhati soldiers and used them against his enemies. He soon after conquered Ajmer with their help and then turned towards Jalore, which was ruled by Sultan Sikandar Khan. Maldeo successfully conquered Jalore and took Sikandar as a prisoner to Jodhpur. Where the sultan died after a short time in prison.

=== Maldeo and Humayun ===
Maldeo Rathore had made an alliance with the Mughal emperor Humayun against Sher Shah Suri. But shortly after, Humayun was defeated in the battles of Chausa and Kannauj by the Afghan emperor. Humayun upon losing most of his territories turned to Maldeo for help and was called to Marwar for refuge by the Rao. According to Rajput sources, Mughals killed several cows on the way to Marwar, this made the local Rajputs hostile towards Humayun as cows were sacred to the Hindus. Humayun was thus forced to flee from Marwar. The Mughal sources however blame Maldeo for betrayal and say that Maldeo breached the alliance because he was given more favourable terms by Sher Shah. According to Satish Chandra - "Maldeo invited him, but seeing the small size of his following, set his face against him". Chandra also says that Maldeo could have arrested Humayun but he refrained as he was an invited guest.

=== Maldeo and Udai Singh II ===
Rao Maldeo took advantage of the Mewari civil war and invaded Mewar. He established a garrison at Jaunpur (in Mewar) and annexed the lands of Sambhar, Kalsi, Fatehpur, Rewasa, Chota-Udaipur, Chatsu, Lawan and Malwarana. It was during this time that the Sisodia nobles asked Maldeo to aid them against Banvir. The combined Rathor-Sisodia army defeated Banvir and secured the throne for Udai Singh II. Maldeo continued to take advantage of the war and used the situation to form military posts in Mewar, Bundi and Ranthambore. This led to a bitter rivalry between Udai Singh II and Maldeo Rathore.

=== War with Bikaner ===
Bikaner was a Rathore kingdom situated towards the north of Marwar. Relations between Marwar and Bikaner had been bitter since the time of Bikaners foundation by Rao Bika. Rao Maldeo used a minor border dispute as a pretext for war and fought a battle with Rao Jaitsi in 1542 at the battle of Sohaba, Rao Jaitsi was killed in battle and Rao Maldeo took advantage of this situation to annex the entire kingdom of Bikaner.

=== War with the Sur Empire ===
A Marital alliance with Jaisalmer secured Marwars western borders but Maldeo was fiercely opposed by the dispossessed chiefs of Bikaner and Merta who made an alliance with the Sur emperor, Sher Shah Suri, of Delhi against Marwar. Shershah forged letters and deceived Maldeo into abandoning his commanders to their fate. Jaita and Kumpa, the two commanders of Maldeo refused to retreat and gave battle to the 80,000 strong Afghan army with a small force of 4,000-12,000 men. Afghan gunfire halted the Rajput charge and the small Rathore army was decimated by the Afghan reinforcements under Jalal Khan. The Afghans also suffered heavy losses in the battle. According to Satish Chandra - Sher Shah's oft quoted remark "I had given away the country of Delhi for a handful of millets" is a tribute to the gallantry of Jaita and Kumpa and the willingness of the Rajputs to face death even in the face of impossible odds. After the Battle of Sammel, Khawas Khan Marwat and Isa Khan Niyazi took possession of Jodhpur and occupied the territory of Marwar from Ajmer to Mount Abu in 1544. However, Maldeo reoccupied his lost territories in 1545 after the death of Sher Shah Suri.

=== War with Amer ===
Rao Maldeo defeated Bharmal and captured four districts of the Amer kingdom. Bharmal in order to save himself sought help from Haji Khan Sur.

=== Battle of Harmoda ===
Haji Khan was a slave of Sher Shah Suri and became the lord of Ajmer and Nagaur after the Battle of Sammel. Maldeo who was on a resurgence to win back his lost territories attacked Haji, however the States of Mewar and Bikaner came to Haji's aid and forced Maldeo to retreat. The relations between Haji and Udai Singh II deteriorated quickly, according to one account it was due to the demand of a dancing girl by Udai Singh in return for his help against Maldeo. Udai Singh threatened Haji for war upon which he fled to the refuge of Maldeo and together their armies defeated Udai Singh in January 1557 in the Battle of Harmoda. Maldeo captured the fortified city of Merta after the battle. Maldeo further invaded Amber and forced the Kachwaha Raja to become a feudatory of Marwar.

=== Mughal invasions ===
Akbar succeeded Humayun in 1556, Many Rajput chiefs mustered around him with their grievances against the Rathore Chief of Jodhpur. Akbar used this as a casus belli against Maldeo and sent several expeditions against Marwar. The Mughals conquered Ajmer and Nagaur in 1557 and soon after Akbar captured Jaitaran and Parbatsar. However the Mughals failed to capture the core territories of Marwar. Maldeo before his death held the districts of Jodhpur, Sojat, Jaitaran, Phalodi, Siwana, Pokhran, Jalore, Sanchore, Merta, Barmer, Kotra and some parts of Jaisalmer. These territories were later captured by Akbar due to the succession war between Maldeo's sons.

== Death and succession ==
Maldeo Rathore had named his younger son, Chandrasen Rathore as his successor but after Maldeo's death on 7 November 1562, a fratricidal contest began for the throne of Marwar.

== In popular culture ==
- 2013–2015: Bharat Ka Veer Putra – Maharana Pratap, broadcast by Sony Entertainment Television (India), where he was portrayed by Surendra Pal.

== Bibliography ==
- Adams, Archibald (1899). The Western Rajputana States: A Medico-topographical and General. Original from the New York Public Library: Junior army & navy stores, limited. p. 63.
