= Rao Jodha =

Rao of Marwar from 1439 to 1489

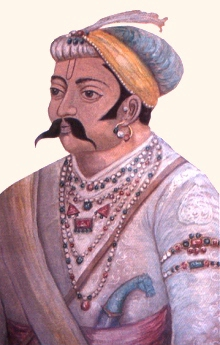
- Portrait of Rao Jodha

Rao of Mandore
- Reign: 27 October 1438 – 6 April 1489
- Predecessor: Rao Ranmal
- Successor: Rao Satal
- Born: 28 March 1416; Mandore, Kingdom of Marwar
- Died: 6 April 1489 (aged 73); Mehrangarh, Kingdom of Marwar
- Spouse: List: Hadi (Chauhan) Rani Jasma De of Bundi State; Bhatiyani Pyar De of Barsalpur in Kingdom of Jaisalmer; Sankhali (Parmar) Navrang De of Roon in Kingdom of Marwar; Songari (Chauhan) Champa De of Pali in Jalore; Solankini Vir De of Desuri; Vagheli Vinay De of Tharad; Hulani Jamna De
- Issue among others: Sons: Rao Satal, Rao of Marwar; Rao Suja, Rao of Marwar; Rao Bika, Rao of Bikaner; Rao Bida, Rao of Bidasar; Rao Duda, Rao of Merta; Daughters: Shringar De, married to Rana Raimal of Kingdom of Mewar; Braj De, married to Rana Sanga of Kingdom of Mewar; Roop De, married to Rawal Devidas of Kingdom of Jaisalmer; Raj De, married to Rana Ajit of Chapar Dronpur in Jangladesh
- Dynasty: Rathore
- Father: Rao Ranmal
- Mother: Bhatiyani Kuram De d. of Rao Lakhamsen of Pugal in Kingdom of Jaisalmer
- Religion: Hinduism

Rao Jodha Rathore (28 March 1416 – 6 April 1489) was the 15th Rajput chief of Rathore clan who ruled the Kingdom of Marwar in the present-day state of Rajasthan. He was the eldest son of Rao Ranmal (Rao Ridmal). He is known for his illustrious military career and for founding the city of Jodhpur in 1459, which subsequently became the new capital of Marwar after Mandore.

== Ancestry ==
Rao Ranmal secured the throne of Mandore in 1427. In addition to ruling Mandore, Rao Ranmal also became the administrator of Mewar to assist Maharana Mokal (father of Rana Kumbha). After the assassination of Maharana Mokal by two brothers (Chacha and Mera) in 1433, Ranmal continued as administrator of Mewar at the side of Rana Kumbha.

== Coronation ==
Due to weakening of Rathore power after the Sisodia assault on Mandore, Rathore chiefs set aside their internal feuds and rallied under the banner of Jodha. At Kavani, Rathore clansmen collectively decided to declare Jodha as Rao, and successor to Rao Ranmal, and the succeeding day was fixed for the Raj-Tilak. Rao Jodha sent emissaries to Deshnoke to request Karni Mata to grace the occasion and herself apply the Tilak. She was unable to come and instead sent Pugree Dastoor to Kavani with her sons and Jaggu Doshi.

Therefore, on Kartik Vadi 5, VS 1496 (27 October 1439), Jodha was put on the Rathore throne and declared the Rao. On the request of the assemblage, Karniji's son Punya Raj, on her behalf, performed the ceremony and applied the Raj-Tilak. Punya Raj gave five leaves of Jhadberi as Karniji's gift which Jodha respectfully put in the Pugree that he had received from Karniji.

== Reign ==
Rao Jodha's father was murdered in Chittor by the Sisodia's after which he escaped with his men, he was pursued by Rawat Chunda, an uncle of Kumbha. Chunda's army killed almost all of Jodha's soldiers in the fights that took place to protect Jodha. Jodha was able to escape to Kahuni and started gathering his men to fight off the invasion. The Rathores were too weak to retaliate, and thus, for several years, Rao Jodha waited for an opportunity and strengthened his position. He gradually started attacking his enemies. The Delhi Sultanate took advantage of Rao Jodha's war with Rana Kumbha and captured several Rathore strongholds including Nagaur, Jhalor and Siwana. Rao Jodha formed an alliance with several Rajput clans including the Deora's and Bhati's and attacked the Delhi army, he succeeded in capturing Merta, Phalodi, Pokran, Bhadrajun, Sojat, Jaitaran, Siwana, parts of Nagaur and Godwar from the Delhi Sultanate. These areas were permanently captured from Delhi and Mewar and became a part of Marwar. Making Marwar the most powerful Kingdom in Rajputana during Jodha's reign. In 1453, he was able to capture his ancestral capital of Mandore from Mewar. After the capture of Mandore, Marwar and Mewar signed a treaty through which peace was restored. Rao Jodha's daughter was also married to Rana Kumbha's son Raimal. After the treaty, Rao Jodha captured Chapar Drona from the Mohils and Fatehpur from the Pathans. In order to further secure his position Jodha also founded the city of Jodhpur and built the fort of Mehrangarh. Instead of conquering more territories, Jodha adopted the policy of giving frontier territories of his kingdom to his sons. Amongst his sons Duda secured the area of Merta, Satal conquered territories of the Bhatis and founded Satalmer, Suja secured Sojat, Raipal captured Asop from Fateh Khan, Karamsi founded Khimsar and Bika with the help of his uncle, Kandhal and brother Rao Bida founded his own kingdom which was later called Bikaner state, Bida founded Bidasar. Rao Jodha raised the political strength of the Rathores to such an extent that even Rana Kumbha sought an alliance with him. The boundaries between Marwar and Mewar were also fixed to avoid hostilities. After Rana Kumbha's death, his successor Rana Udai Singh I requested help from the Rathores against his own clansmen and gave Jodha the territories of Sambhar and Ajmer. Jodha's last battle against the Delhi Sultanate took place in 1489 when Sarang Khan, the Sultan's governor of Hissar, killed Jodha's brother Kandhal in a skirmish. Rao Jodha and his son Bika led an army to Dronpur where a battle took place. After heavy casualties, the Delhi army was defeated.

=== Recapture of Mandore (1453 AD) ===
Mandore was occupied by Sisodia forces and on behalf of Maharana of Mewar, Narbad (son of Rao Satta) was stationed there with a strong garrison at Mandore with orders to pursue and destroy Jodha. For the next 12 years, Narbad would relentlessly devise ways to draw out and capture Jodha. He would often deliberately leave his flanks exposed and even leave the route to Mandore ill-defended in the hope enticing Jodha to attack in the open. But Karniji had forewarned Rao Jodha. She had told him not to risk a major battle until she gave an all clear. Thus forewarned, Rao Jodha bided his time at Kavani for 12 years.

One day in VS 1510 (1453), Karniji sent a message to Rao Jodha asking him to promptly reach Deshnoke with as many Rathores as he could muster. Accordingly, he reached Deshnoke and appearing before Karniji sought advice and directions. Karniji told him that the opportune time for invading Mandore had arrived and he must march with his men towards Mandore.

During the way to Mandore, Jodha camped at the hamlet of Modhi Moolani in village Sirdan. Here, Jodha was served affectionately by Modhi with halwa dish. The Modhi told him, "Don’t worry. I put some majith to make up for the shortage of maida. This auspicious hue on your mustache is a sure sign of Karniji’s blessings. Your victory is certain. Proceed at once to Mandore."

Jodha next camped at Bengati where Harbuji Sankhla, one of the five well-known holy men of Rajasthan, played host. Jodha and his men were offered bajra khichri by the saint. While departing, Harbuji told Jodha he will suffer no defeat so long as he has Sri Karniji's blessings and that he shall reconquer his heritage. Thus Jodha proceeded accepting assistance from chiefs of estates and villages falling on the route.

Jodha arrived near Mandore with a contingent of 700 horses and 10,000 foot soldiers where with the assistance of Kalu Mangalia, who was Jodha's confidant and worked as an insider for the enemy, was able to enter with 1000 of men in the citadel. These men let inside the rest of the army in the night and stormed the fort from within. This took the Sisodias and their Rathore supporters by surprise and by sunrise Jodha took over Mandore.

Nearest remaining outpost of Sisodias, Chokri was attacked by Rao Kandhal (brother of Rao Jodha) the following day. Rao Kandhal then marched an army on Merta and Ajmer which he conquered in the course of year, Samvat 1510 (1453 AD). Thus, Rao Jodha was able to reconquer his inheritance & restrengthened the Rathores in Marwar.

=== Foundation of Jodhpur ===
Mehrangarh fort, Jodhpur

A holy man sensibly advised Rao Jodha to move the capital to hilltop safety. By 1459, it became evident that a more secure headquarters was required. Chidia-tunk, a high rocky ridge, nine km to the south of Mandore was an obvious choice for the new city of Jodhpur. The natural elevation was enhanced by a fortress of staggering proportions, to which Rao Jodha's successors added over the centuries. Jodhpur was on the important Delhi to Gujarat trade route and it greatly benefited from the trade of silk, opium, sandalwood, copper and other items. The Mehrangarh Fort, situated on a 125 m high hill, is among the most impressive and formidable forts in Rajasthan. The construction of the fort was begun by Maharaja Rao Jodha in 1459 and was improvised by Maharaja Jaswant Singh (1637–1680).

The fort originally had seven gates ("pols"). There is a first gate with spikes to prevent attack from elephants. The Fatehpol or victory gate was erected by Maharaja Ajit Singh in 1707 to commemorate his victory over the Mughals. The other gates include the Jai Pol, built by Maharaja Man Singh in 1806, following his victory over the armies of Jaipur and Bikaner.

Jodha's mother Koram de built KodamdeSar (now in Bikaner) Pond. Jodha's wife Rani Hadi Jasmade built Ranisar tank, which is now within walls of Mehrangarh fort. Rani Sonagri Chand Kanwar built a Baori, called Chand Baori

== Death and the succession ==
Rao Jodha died on 6 April 1489, aged 73. The death of Rao Jodha was followed by a struggle for succession amongst his sons. He was succeeded by his son Rao Satal (1489–1491). After Satal's death, Rao Jodha's son Rao Suja (1491–1515) occupied the throne.

== See also ==
- Jodhpur State
- Rulers of Marwar
- Panch Mahal Maroth
- Jiliya alias Abhaypura
- List of Rajputs
- Rao Nara
