= Rao Satal =

Rao of Marwar from 1489 to 1492

- Rao of Marwar

Ruler of Marwar
- Reign: 6 April 1489 – 13 March 1492
- Predecessor: Rao Jodha
- Successor: Rao Suja
- Died: 13 March 1492; Pipar, Marwar, Rajputana
- Spouse: Bhatiyaniji Phool Deiji of Pugal; Bhatiyaniji Kalyan Deiji of Jaisalmer; Bhatiyaniji Harka Deiji of Bikampur
- Dynasty: Rathore
- Father: Rao Jodha
- Mother: Hadiji Jasma Deiji d.of Jaitmal of Bundi
- Religion: Hinduism

Rao Satal (died 13 March 1492) was a late 15th-century Rathore Rajput ruler of the Kingdom of Marwar. He was the second son of Rao Jodha and elder brother of Rao Bika of Bikaner who while their father was alive laid the foundation of a separate territory for his descendants. Rao Satal is considered as one of the greatest martyrs of his race, as he's remembered for having sacrificed his own life to keep the honour of his subjects.

On hearing that Afghan soldiers had abducted 140 girls from a village near Merta, he set out with an army to rescue the girls. Satal led his men to rescue the girls despite a Rajput tradition of not engaging in battle after sunset. The Afghan warlord Gudhla Khan had Herculean strength and the armour he wore was so heavy that no weapon could pierce it, Rao Satal was fatally wounded while fighting Gudhla but he was able to kill him by severing his head through an opening in his armour. Rao Satal saved the girls and personally escorted them to their village, but he succumbed to his wounds and died that night. The head of Gudhla was then taken by one of the girls and it was paraded around the town to show that Gudhla had been slain by the brave Rathore chieftain and that their honour remained untarnished.

In commemoration of this event, a festival is held in Marwar in March. At sunset, on the appointed day, young married girls make their way to the local potter’s home to get an earthen pot, which is riddled with holes. The girls place an oil lamp in the earthen pot and the procession wends its way through the streets with the pot held high midst a chanting of folk song Gudhla ghoomelaji. The lamp is paraded in a similar manner as to how Gudhlas's head was paraded by the maidens after they were saved and reached their village. After sunset, the pot is taken to the nearest lake and gently cast away.

The riddled pot symbolises the head of Gudhla Khan and the festival acknowledges the long-dead king who lost his life in the protection of his subjects.

Rao Satal is said to have founded Satalmer a village between south western and north western borders of Marwar and Jangaldesh and one of his queen Bhatiyaniji Phulam Deiji or Phool Kanwar, commissioned Phulelao Talab in 1490. On hearing the sad news of Rao Satal's death at Pipar village all of his queens committed sati.

Rao Satal Rathore
| Preceded by Jodha | Rao of Marwar; 6 April 1489 – March 1492 | Succeeded by Suja |
