= Umade Bhattiyani =

Wife of Maldeo Rathore

Rani of Marwar
- Tenure: c. 1537 – 1562
- Died: 20 November 1562; Kelva, Mewar, India
- Spouse: Maldeo Rathore
- Dynasty: Bhati
- Father: Rawal Lunkaran Bhati
- Religion: Hinduism

Umade Bhattiyani (d. 1562; other names Umadeo, Uma Devi) was one of the wives of Maldeo Rathore, the renowned Rathore ruler of Marwar (r. 1532 – 1562). She was known as Roothi Rani — the Irate or Aggrieved Queen, or 'the Queen-who-Sulked.

== Family ==
Umade is a princess of the Bhati Rajput clan of Jaisalmer and was the daughter of Rawal Lunkaran Bhati, the ruler of Jaisalmer (r. 1530 - 1551). Her sister Dheer Bai Bhattiyani was the favourite wife of Maharana Udai Singh II of Mewar.

== Marriage ==
She was married to Maldeo Rathore. The marriage was not a happy one. She also refused to have any conjugal relations with him. Her attitude towards Maldeo earned her the title Roothi Rani.

== In popular culture ==
- Umade is the titular character of the novella Roothi Rani written by Premchand.
- A fictionalized Umade was portrayed by Mreenal Deshraj in Sony TV's historical drama Bharat Ka Veer Putra – Maharana Pratap.

== Of note ==
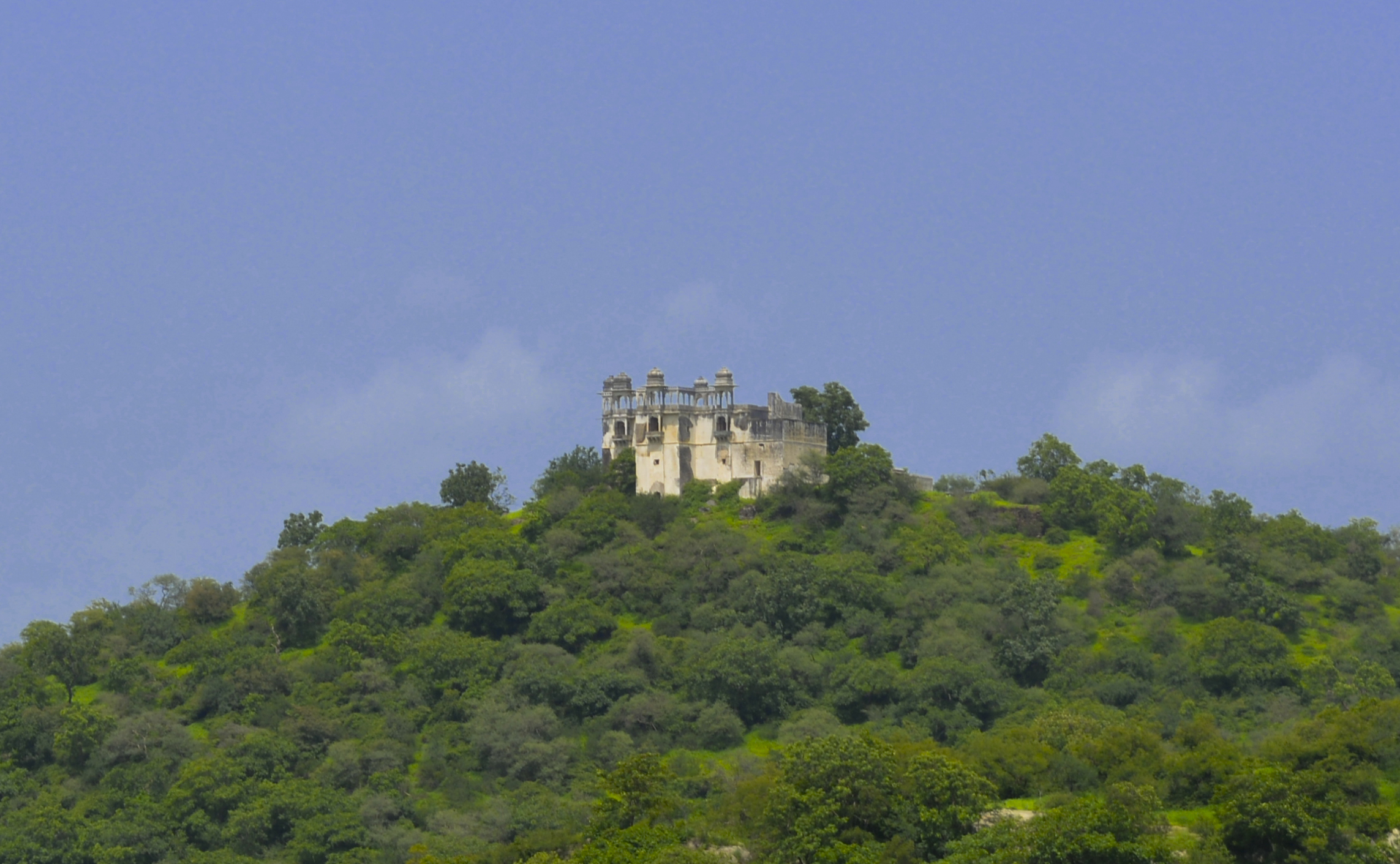
Umade's palace in Jaisamand

There is a similar story about another Roothi Rani in the Jaisamand area The Hawa Mahal near Dhebar Lake or Jaisamand Lake is also known as Roothi Rani ka Mahal.
