= Rao Suja =

Rao of Marwar from 1492 to 1515

Suja
- Rao of the Kingdom of Marwar
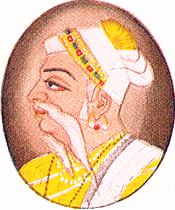

Rao of Marwar
- Reign: 13 March 1492 – 2 October 1515
- Predecessor: Rao Satal Rathore of Marwar
- Successor: Rao Ganga
- Born: 2 August 1439
- Died: 2 October 1515 (aged 76); Mehrangarh, Marwar
- Spouse: Rani Sarangde Bai Bhatiyani of Jaisalmer; Rani Chauhanji; Rani Mangliyani Sarvandeji; Rani Sahodharam Bai Sankhla
- Issue: Shekha; Bagha (father of Rao Ganga; b. 1457); Nara; Rao Devidas; Uda (b. 1462); Pirag; Sanga; Prithiraj; Napo; Rani Khetubai Rathore of Bundi
Names
- Marwari: सुजदेव राठौर; Sujadeva Rathore
- Dynasty: Rathore
- Father: Rao Jodha
- Mother: Rani Jasmade Bai Hada of Bundi
- Religion: Hinduism

Rao Suja Rathore (2 August 1439 – 2 October 1515) was a Rathore ruler of the Kingdom of Marwar. He was a son of Jodha, brother of Satal. On his death, there was a short struggle for the throne between his grandsons Biram Singh and Ganga, which the latter won. During his reign, pathans made an incursion into Marwar. The bands of pathans pilaged, looted and ransacked various towns and took with them women as slaves. When Rao Suja was informed about this incident, he gave a chase at the head of his army to rescue the women and to avenge the ravishment of his domain. He freed the enslaved women but was slain in the ensuing battle.

== Family ==
Suja's consorts were:

- Rani Bhatiyani Sarangdeji (née Likhmibai), daughter of Bhati Kalikaran. She was a granddaughter of Raval Kehar of Jaisalmer and sister of Bhati Jeso, founder of Jeso Sakh of Marwar Bhati.
- Rani Chauhanji, daughter of Rao Pithamrav Chauhan of Sacor, Bamra.
- Rani Mangliyani Sarvandeji, daughter of Mangliyo Gahlot Rana Patu.
- Rani Sankhli Sahodharamji

=== Issue ===
Suja's sons were:

- Shekha (with the daughter of Rao Pithamrav) — Eldest son of Rao Suja. He was hostile towards Rao Ganga and Rao Maldeo. His descendants are the Shekhavat Rathors.
- Bagha (7 December 1457 – 3 September 1514; with Sarangdeji) — He was elected successor by Rao Suja but died during Suja's lifetime. His daughter, Dhan Kanwar, married Rana Sanga of Mewar. His son, Ganga became the Rao of Marwar.
- Nara (with Sarangdeji) — He founded Naravat sakh of Marwar Rathors.
- Devidas Rao Devidas (with daughter of Rao Pithamrav) – Rao Devidas' sons were Rao Harraj and Rao Panchayan. Thikanas descended from him are: Jhadpiplya, Bisoniya, Madapura, Gagorni, Aanda, Bawadikheda, Aagriya, Bilwa. TPresent-day descendants are: Thakur Vikram Singh; Rathore of Thikana Jhadpiplya; Thakur Aalok Kumar Singh; Rathore of Thikana Bisoniya; Thakur Narayan Singh, Rathore of Thikana Bawadikhera (Dongargaon).
- Uda (16 November 1462 – 12 May 1511; with Sarvandeji) — He conquered Jaitaran and had a fort built there. His descendants are the Udavat Rathors.
- Pirag (with Sarvandeji)
- Sanga (with Sarvandeji)
- Prithiraj (with Sahodramji)
- Napo (with Sahodramji)

His daughter was:

- Khetubai – She was married to Hada Rao Narayandas of Bundi and mother of Rao Surajmal of Bundi.
