= Rao Ganga =

Rao of Marwar from 1515 to 1532

Ganga
- Rao
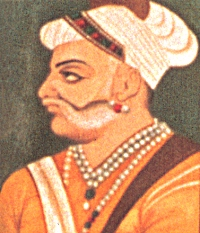
- Rao Ganga

Rao of Marwar
- Reign: 8 November 1515 – 9 May 1532
- Predecessor: Rao Suja
- Successor: Maldev Rathore
- Born: 6 May 1484
- Died: 9 May 1532 (aged 48)
- Spouse: Rani Padmavati of Sirohi; Rani Manakde (or Manak Deiji); Rani Lada Bai; Rani Javanta Bai; Rani Phulam (or Phulan) Bai; Rani Sabira Bai
- Issue: Rao Maldeo Rathore; Bhair Sal; Man Singh; Kishan Das of Nanadwan; Sadul; Kanha; Rani Son Kanwar of Jaisalmer; Rani Raj Kanwar of Mewar; Rani Champa Bai of Sirohi
- Dynasty: Rathore
- Father: Vagho Sujavat
- Mother: Udanbai Chauhan (of Bamra)
- Religion: Hinduism

Rao Ganga or Rav Gango Vaghavat (6 May 1484 – 9 May 1532) was an Indian king from the Rathore dynasty who ruled the traditional Rathore realm of Maruwara, the Kingdom of Marwar, in the present-day state of Rajasthan. Ganga ascended to the throne in 1515 through the support from his kinsmen and nobles. During his reign, the Rathores, a Rajput clan, consolidated and expanded their rule in Marwar, even annexing territories from the Afghans and Ganga's own relatives.

He retained positive relations with his neighbours, most notably with the powerful Sisodia dynasty monarch Rana Sanga whom he aided in his various campaigns. Ganga sent a contingent of Rathore troops under the command of his son Prince Maldeo, which fought in the historic Battle of Khanwa against the Mughal invader Babur. At this battle, Maldeo was to rescue the wounded and unconscious Sanga from the battlefield. Maldeo succeeded his father when Ganga died in 1531 CE, possibly at Maldeo's hands, or by accident. It was under Maldeo that the Rathore kingdom reached its zenith.

== Reign ==
Ganga or Gango was born on 6 May 1484, the son of Vagho Sujavat and Udanbai Chauhan. Despite being a younger son of the king, Rao Suja, Vagho Sujavat was the chosen successor, but died before his father. Ganga rose to the throne on 8 November 1515 as his older brother Rao Viramde was considered unfit to rule and was unable to gain the support of the Rathore nobility. Ganga set up his palace in Jodhpur. However, Viramde was unwilling to remain subordinate, laying the foundation for future conflicts between Sojhat and Jodhpur.

At the time of Ganga's accession, the Delhi Sultanate was in rapid decline under its unpopular ruler Ibrahim Lodhi, which allowed Ganga to expand the frontiers of his own kingdom. During his reign, the Sisodia king Rana Sanga (r. 1508–1528) embarked on a period of territorial expansion of Mewar after defeating various Sultanates in pitched battles, including the Lodhis. Taking the opportunity, Ganga made friendly relations with Mewar, enhancing the alliance further by marrying one of his sisters, Dhan Kanwar, to Sanga.

On various occasions, Ganga sent contingents of Rathore soldiers in aid of his brother-in-law's military campaigns and himself in person assisted him against Muzaffar Shah of Gujarat in reinstating Raimal on the throne of Idar. Ganga send a strong army of 4,000 under Prince Maldeo who led the left contingent of the Rajput army in Battle of Khanwa on 17 March 1527. When Sanga was wounded and fainted in the battle, he was removed from the battlefield in an unconscious state by Prince Maldev aided by Prithviraj Kachwaha of Dhundar.

After the triumph in Khanwa, Babur did not penetrate into Rajasthan and the subsequent decline of Mewar after the assassination of Sanga allowed Ganga to expand his kingdom and laid the base for a powerful Rathore kingdom. On 2 November 1529, in the Battle of Sevaki, Ganga confronted the forces of Sojat, who had gained the support of Daualt Khan and Sarkhel Khan. He won the battle, with the Sojat leader Sekho Sujavat dead, both Daualt Khan and Sarkhel Khan fleeing the scene. Afterwards, Ganga faced an invasion of Afghans from Nagore under the command of Daualt Khan. In a pitched battle aided by Rathore branch of Bikaner, Ganga defeated the Afghans and killed Sarkhel Khan in the battle.

== Death ==
Ganga died on 21 May 1531. According to the historian Muhnot Nainsi in his work Nainsi ri khyat, he was murdered by his ambitious son Maldeo who pushed him from the balcony. Later writers assert that Ganga's fall was an accidental one due to opium, without giving any conclusive evidence to exonerate Maldeo from charge of patricide. It was under the rule of Maldeo that the Rathore house reached its pinnacle of its political importance and territorial expansion.

== Issue ==
Rao Ganga had six sons:

- Maldeo, (by Rani Padmavati) who succeeded his father.
- Vairsal (by Rani Manakde)
- Man Singh (by Rani Manakde)
- Kishan Singh (by Lada Bai)
- Sadul (by Javanta Bai)
- Kanh (by Javanta Bai)

He had three daughters:

- Son Bai, who married Bhati Raval Lunkaran Jaitslyot of Jaisajmer (1528–1551)
- Raj Kanwar, who married Sisodia Guhilot Rana Vikramaditya Singh of Mewar (c. 1531–1536)
- Champa Bai, who married Rao Rai Singh Deora Akhairajot of Sirohi

== Works cited ==
- Agarwal, B.D. (1979). Rajasthan District Gazetteers: Jodhpur. Gazetteer of India. Jaipur: Directorate of District Gazetteers, Government of Rajasthan. p. 31. OCLC 863423268.
- Bhargava, Visheshwar Sarup (1966). Marwar and the Mughal Emperors (A. D. 1526-1748). Delhi: Munshiram Manoharlal. ISBN 978-8-12150-400-3.
- Hooja, Rima (2006). A History of Rajasthan. New Delhi: Rupa & Company. ISBN 978-81-291-1501-0 – via Internet Archive. [Also – via Google Books, see p. 521. (subscription required)].
- Reu, Viśveśvaranātha (1999). Māravāṛa kā itihāsa [History of Amjhera State] (in Hindi). Jodhapura: Mahārāja Mānasiṃha Pustaka Prakāśa. ISBN 978-8-18610-345-6.
- Saran, Richard; Ziegler, Norman P., eds. (2001). The Mertiyo Rathors of Merto, Rajasthan: Select Translations Bearing on the History of a Rajput Family, 1462–1660. [In two volumes]. Vol. 2: Biographical Notes with Introduction, Glossary of Kinship Terms and Indexes. Translated and annotated by Richard Saran and Norman P. Ziegler. Ann Arbor, MI (US): University of Michigan Press. doi:10.3998/mpub.19305. ISBN 978-0-47290-173-9. ISBN 978-0-89148-085-3
- Schomer, Karine (1994). The Idea of Rajasthan: Explorations in Regional Identity Volume. 2, Institutions. New Delhi: American Institute of Indian Studies. ISBN 978-8-18542-584-9.
- Sharma, Gopal Krishna (2014). History and Culture of Rajasthan: From Earliest Times Upto 1956 A.D. Jaipur: Centre for Rajasthan Studies, University of Rajasthan. ISBN 978-8-19251-649-3.
- Somani, R. (1976). History of Mewar, from Earliest Times to 1751 A.D. Jaipur: Mateshwari Publications.

Rao Ganga Rathore
Preceded by Rao Suja	Rao of Marwar; 8 November 1515 – 9 May 1532	Succeeded by Maldeo
