= Biram Singh Rathore =

16th century ruler of Marwar

Biram Singh
- Dynasty: Rathore
- Father: Bhaga Rathore
- Mother: Rangde of Sirohi
- Religion: Hinduism

Rao Biram Singh Ji Rathore (r. 1515) was a sixteenth century ruler of Marwar. He was the grandson of his predecessor Suja.
