= Bishnoi (surname) =

Bishnoi or Vishnoi is a Hindic surname that may refer to:

- Ashok Manda Bishnoi, better known by his stage name Rapperiya Baalam, Indian rapper and songwriter
- Bhajan Lal Bishnoi (1930–2011), Indian politician
- Bhavya Bishnoi (born 1993), Indian politician
- Bihari Lal Bishnoi (born 1979), Indian politician
- Chaitanya Bishnoi (born 1994), Indian cricketer
- Chander Mohan Bishnoi, former Deputy Chief Minister of Haryana
- Jagdish Bishnoi (born 1972), Indian javelin thrower
- Jaswant Singh Bishnoi (born 1958), Indian politician
- Khamu Ram Bishnoi (born 1966), Indian environmental activist
- Kishna Ram Vishnoi (born 1965), Indian politician
- Kiran Bishnoi, Indian freestyle wrestler
- Kripa Shankar Patel Bishnoi (born 1977), Indian professional wrestler and coach
- Kuldeep Bishnoi (born 1968), Indian politician
- Lawrence Bishnoi, Indian Gangster
- Mahendra Bishnoi (born 1981), Indian politician
- Malkhan Singh Bishnoi, Indian politician
- Pabba Ram Bishnoi (1951), Indian politician
- Poonam Chand Vishnoi, Indian politician
- Rajesh Bishnoi (born 1987), Indian cricketer
- Rajesh Bishnoi (cricketer, born 1990), Indian cricketer
- Ram Narayan Bishnoi (1932–2012), Indian politician
- Ram Singh Bishnoi, Indian politician
- Raman Bishnoi (born 1997), Indian cricketer
- Ranaram Bishnoi, Indian environmentalist
- Ravi Bishnoi (born 2000), Indian cricketer
- Renuka Bishnoi, Indian politician
- Salil Vishnoi (born 1955), Indian politician
- Shweta Bishnoi (born 1992), Indian cricketer
- Sukhram Bishnoi (born 1953), Indian politician
