= List of villages in Nokha tehsil =

This is a list of villages located in Nokha tehsil of Bikaner district, Rajasthan, India.

- Ankhisar
- Badh Kakara
- Bakhtawarpura
- Bandhala
- Bandhra
- Basi
- Beekasar
- Berasar
- Badhla
- Bhamatsar
- Bhom Bagseu
- Bhom Bilniyasar
- Bhom Kirtasar
- Bhom Maiyasar
- Bhyau
- Biramsar
- Boodhron Ki Dhani
- Chachaniya
- Chainasar
- Charkara
- Chitana
- Dasnoo
- Dawa
- Desalsar Bhatiyan
- Desalsar Mandlawatan
- Desalsar Purohitan
- Dharnok
- Dheengsari
- Dhoopaliya
- Durgapura
- Gajroopdesar
- Ghattoo
- Gondusar
- Govind Nagar
- Hansasar
- Hemolai
- Himatsar
- Hiyadesar
- Jagrampura
- Jaisingh Desar Magra
- Jangloo
- Jegla Gogliyan
- Jegala Panna Daroga
- Jesalsar
- Kahira
- Kakkoo
- Kanwlisar
- Kedli
- Khara
- Kheechiyasar
- Kirtasar
- Kisnasar
- Koodsoo
- Kookniya
- Kunbhasar
- Ladhupura
- Leelka
- Lumbasar
- Madhiya
- Maiyasar
- Manaksar
- Mandeliya
- Manyana
- Meghasar
- Moolwas
- Morkhana Aguna
- Morkhana Athuna
- Mukam
- Munjasar
- Mureedsar
- Nagarjana
- Nathoosar
- Nimdiyasar
- Nokhagaon
- Nokha Mandi
- Panchoo
- Parwa
- Pithrasar
- Prahlad Pura
- Raisar
- Ram Nagar
- Rasisar Bas Bara
- Rasisar Bas Panchayatiyan
- Rasisar Bas Purohitan
- Rasisar Bas Talariya
- Ratriya
- Rora
- Sadhoona
- Sainsar
- Salundiya
- Satheeka
- Seelwa
- Sekhasar
- Sharah Kalasar
- Sharah Manaksar
- Sharah Panchoo
- Sharah Teliya
- Shri Rampura
- Shindhu
- Shijguru
- Shobhana
- Somasar
- Surpura
- Sowa
- Swaroopsar
- Talwa
- Tant
- Tardo Ki Basti
- Teliyasar
- Udasar
