= Radheshyam Bishnoi =

Indian wildlife conservationist and animal rescuer

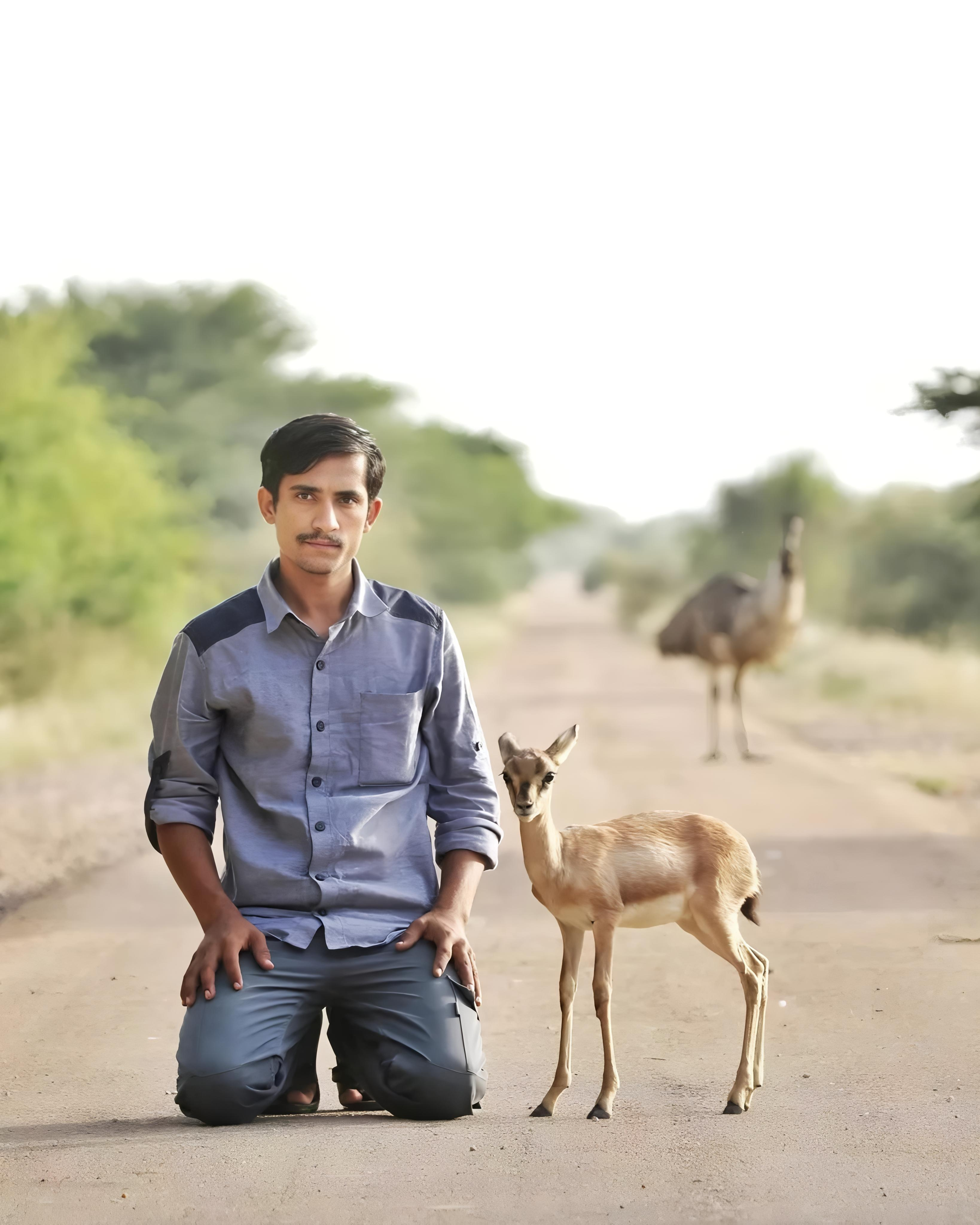
- Born: 1997; Dholiya Village, Jaisalmer, Rajasthan
- Died: 24 May 2025 (aged 27–28); NH 11, Jaisalmer
- Resting place: Dholiya Village, Jaisalmer
- Other names: Godawan man of India
- Occupations: Wildlife saver and Photographer
- Known for: Wildlife rescuer and animal rescuer
- Notable work: Protecting great indian bustard
- Awards: Young Naturalist Award (2021)

Radheshyam Bishnoi (1997 — 24 May 2025) was an Indian wildlife conservationist and animal rescuer from Dholiya village in the Pokhran region of Rajasthan. He was known for his work in the conservation of the Great Indian Bustard (GIB), a critically endangered species native to the Indian subcontinent. Bishnoi received the Sanctuary Nature Foundation's 'Young Naturalist Award' in 2021.

== Early life and education ==
Bishnoi was born in Dholiya village, located in the Thar Desert of Rajasthan. He belonged to the Bishnoi community, which is traditionally known for its environmental and wildlife protection ethos. His interest in wildlife conservation began at an early age. There, he encountered the Great Indian Bustard for the first time, which later became central to his conservation work.

== Career ==
Bishnoi began his conservation work in Dholiya, Rajasthan, where he assisted injured wildlife.

In 2016, he completed a wildlife first aid course at Machia Biological Park in Jodhpur, where he developed an interest in the conservation of the Great Indian Bustard.

He later worked with the ERDS Foundation, focusing on monitoring habitats, documenting threats such as power line collisions, and coordinating with local communities.

== Awards and recognitions ==
In 2021, Bishnoi received the Sanctuary Nature Foundation's 'Young Naturalist Award' for his dedicated efforts in GIB conservation.

In 2025, after his death, the Asian Ecotourism Network honoured him posthumously at the Global Wildlife Fair, where his mentor Sumit Dukia was present to receive the award.

== Death ==
On 24 May 2025, Bishnoi died in a road accident near Jaisalmer, Rajasthan, while en route to investigate a poaching incident. The vehicle he was travelling in collided with a truck on National Highway 11.
