= Manyana, Rajasthan =

Manyana
- Village
- Location in Rajasthan, India Manyana (India)
- Coordinates: 27.6895°N 73.3296°E
- Country: India
- State: Rajasthan
- District: Bikaner
- Tehsil: Nokha

Government
  - Type: Panchayati raj (India)
  - Body: Gram panchayat
- Elevation: 217 m (712 ft)

Population (2011)
  - Total: 1,994

Languages
  - Official: Marwari, Hindi
- Time zone: UTC+5:30 (IST)
- PIN: 334801
- Telephone code: 01532
- Vehicle registration: RJ-07, RJ-50
- Nearest village: Bhamatsar
- Temperature: Summer: 41°C (105°F); Winter: -7°C (44°F)

Manyana is a village located in Nokha tehsil of Bikaner district of Rajasthan state, India.

It is located 320 kilometres (199 mi) from Jaipur, 218 kilometres (135 mi) from Jodhpur, and 476 kilometres (296 mi) from Mount Abu.

The village is administrated by a sarpanch (head of the village) who is elected every five years. In 2011 the population of the village was 5,000, with 614 households.

== Geography ==
The total geographical area of the village is 1538 hectares. The total population of Manyana is 1,994 people. There are about 260 houses in Manyana village. As per 2019 data, Manyana village falls under Nokha Assembly and Bikaner Parliamentary Constituencies. Bhamtasar is the nearest village of Manyana which is about 4 km away.
