= Bishnoi =

Indian religious sect or community

Bishnoi/Vishnoi
- बिश्नोई (Hindi) ਬਿਸ਼ਨੋਈ (Punjabi)
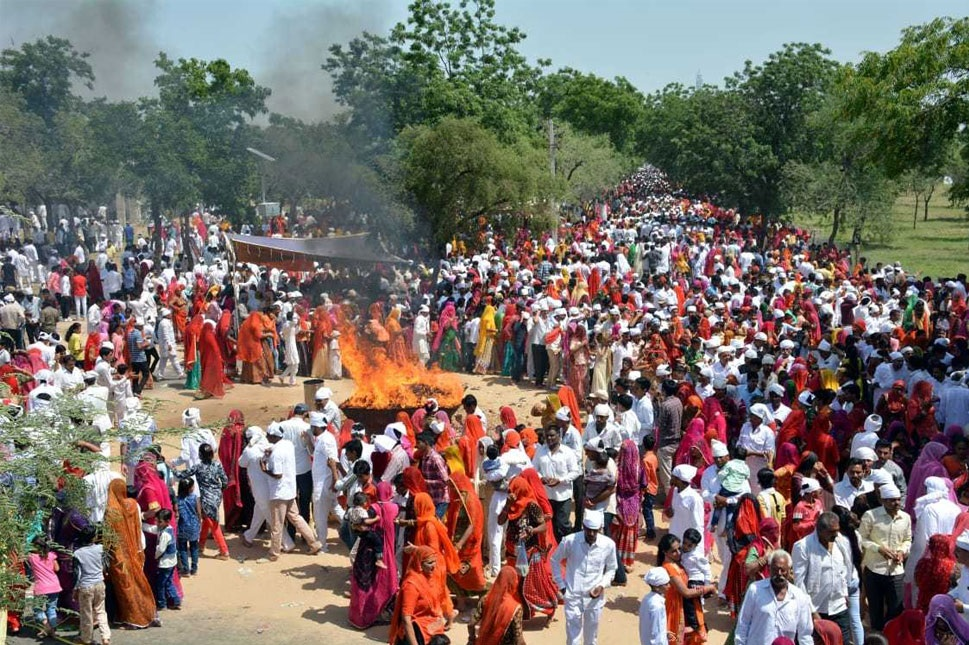
- Bishnois performing havan with kopra and ghee at Khejarli Environment Fair
- Classification: Sub sect of Vaishnavism
- Guru: Guru Jambheshwar
- Mantra: "Vishnu Vishnu Tu Bhan Re Prani"
- Religions: Hinduism
- Languages: Marwari; Rajasthani; Bagri; Hindi; Haryanvi; Punjabi
- Country: India
- Populated states: Major: Rajasthan; Minor: Haryana; Uttar Pradesh, Madhya Pradesh, Punjab; Gujarat
- Region: Western India; Northern India
- Population: ~1,500,000

The Bishnoi, also spelled as Vishnoi, is a Hindu Vaishnava community or panth found in the Western Thar Desert and northern states of India. The Bishnoi community established itself as a Hindu caste with time. It has a set of 29 Niyamas (principles/commandments) established by Guru Jambheshwar (also known as Guru Jambhoji, Guru Jambha) (1451–1536). As of 2010, there are an estimated 600,000 followers of Bishnoi Panth residing in northern and central India. Shree Guru Jambheshwar founded the sect at Samrathal Dhora in 1485 and his teachings, comprising 120 shabads, are known as Shabadwani. He preached for the next 51 years, travelling across India. The preaching of Guru Jambhoji inspires his followers as well as environmental protectors.

== Etymology ==
The term bishnoi is believed to be derived from bis (twenty) and nau (nine) and hence, it denotes the twenty nine principles of their sect.

== Origin ==
Bishnoi is a panth who adopted the 29 principles which emphasised social ethics, environmental conservation and personal hygiene. These people’s are mostly from the Jat community.

However they also includes some members from Bania, Rajput, Khati and Gaena.

== Clan structure ==
There are 360 gotras of Bishnois which are considered to be of equal social status and they regulate marriage alliances. These gotras include Pawar, Godara, Khichore, Dhaka, Biria etc.

== History ==
Bishnoi Panth was founded by Shree Guru Jambheshwar (1451–1536), also known as Jambhoji. Some people have used the term Vishnoi, meaning followers of Vishan (Vishnu's name in local dialect), while most refer to themselves as Bishnoi. Adherents are also known as Jambeshwarpanthi because of their devotion to their Guru, Jambeshwar.

Shree Guru Jambeshwar announced a set of 29 Niyamas (Tenets). These were contained in a document called Shabadwani, written in the Nagri script, which consists of 120 shabads. Of his 29 Niyamas, ten are directed towards personal hygiene and maintaining good basic health, seven for healthy social behaviour, and four tenets to the worship of God. Eight Niyamas have been prescribed to preserve bio-diversity and encourage good animal husbandry. These include a ban on killing animals and cutting green trees, and providing protection to all life forms. The community is also directed to see that the firewood they use is devoid of small insects. Wearing blue clothes is prohibited because the dye for colouring them is obtained by cutting a large quantity of shrubs. They are called the first eco-warriors due to their pro-active approach in conserving ecological balance and protecting the environment. The word Bishnoi is derived from 'bis' and 'noi'. In the local language, 'Bis' means '20’ and 'Noi' means '9’. When both are added, the sum is 29.

== 29 rules or principles ==
The 29 principles (20 Niyamas + 9 Yamas) of Bishnois are as follows:

1. Observe a 30-day state of impurity after childbirth, and keep the mother and child away from household activities.
2. Observe five-day segregation from households activities such as cooking food, serving water, etc. while a woman is in her menses.
3. Bathe daily in the morning before sunrise.
4. Obey the ideal rules of life: modesty, Kshama (patience), or Santosha (satisfactions), Shaucha (cleanliness).
5. Puja (Pray) twice every day (morning and evening).
6. Eulogize God, Vishnu, in the evening (Aarti)
7. Performance of Yajna (Havan) is said by Guru jambhoji to symbolize Homa as the process to distance lust, anger, greed, attachment and ego from oneself to attain ultimate freedom, bliss, peace and truth. This is also said for being a better human being.
8. Use filtered water, milk, and cleaned firewood or use cooking fuel after removing living organisms around it.
9. Speak Satya (Pure words) in all Arjava (Sincerity.)
10. Practice Kshama (Forgiveness) and Karuṇā (kindness) from the heart.
11. Be merciful with sincerity.
12. Achourya (Do not steal) nor harbour any intention to do it.
13. Do not condemn or criticize.
14. Do not lie.
15. Do not indulge in disputes or conflicts.
16. Vrata (fast) on Amavasya.
17. Worship and recite the name of Lord Vishnu in adoration.
18. Be merciful to all living beings and love them. And, love is when you do not demand, possess and expect.
19. Do not cut green trees, save the environment.
20. Keep away from Kama (lust), Krodha (anger), Lobha (greed), and Mohā (attachment). Use one's strength for the right cause and fight for righteousness till the last breath. This will take one to eternity.
21. Cook one's own food and be self-sufficient.
22. Provide shelters for abandoned animals to avoid them from being slaughtered in abattoirs.
23. Do not sterilize bulls, do not abandon male calves from dairy farms. Pay for their welfare to shelter them.
24. Do not use or trade opium.
25. Do not smoke or use tobacco or its products.
26. Do not take bhang or hemp or any addiction which can weak human mind or body.
27. Do not drink alcohol/liquor because alcohol degrades health very rapidly.
28. Do not eat meat, always remain vegan or ethical lacto-vegetarian.
29. Do not wear blue attire of blue colour as this colour is extracted from the indigo plant.

== Places of pilgrimage ==
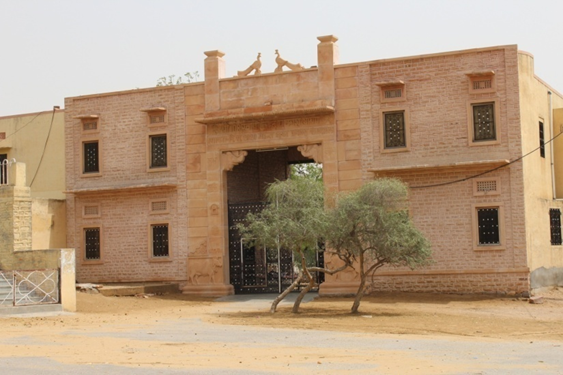
Bishnoi Temple at Samrathal Dhora

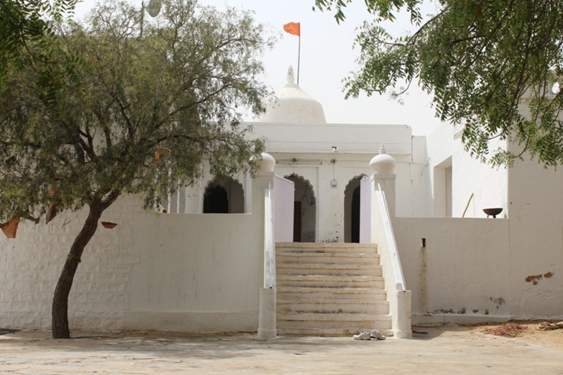
Lohawat Temple of the Bishnois

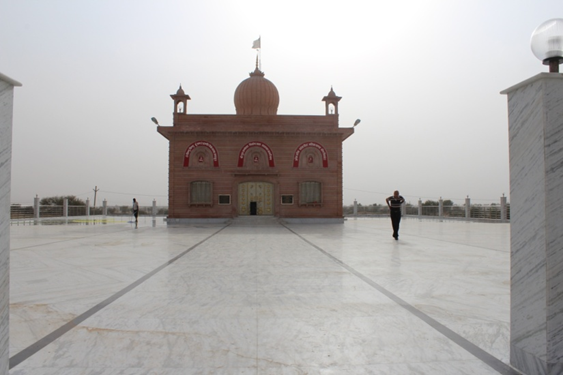
Lalasar Temple of Bishnois

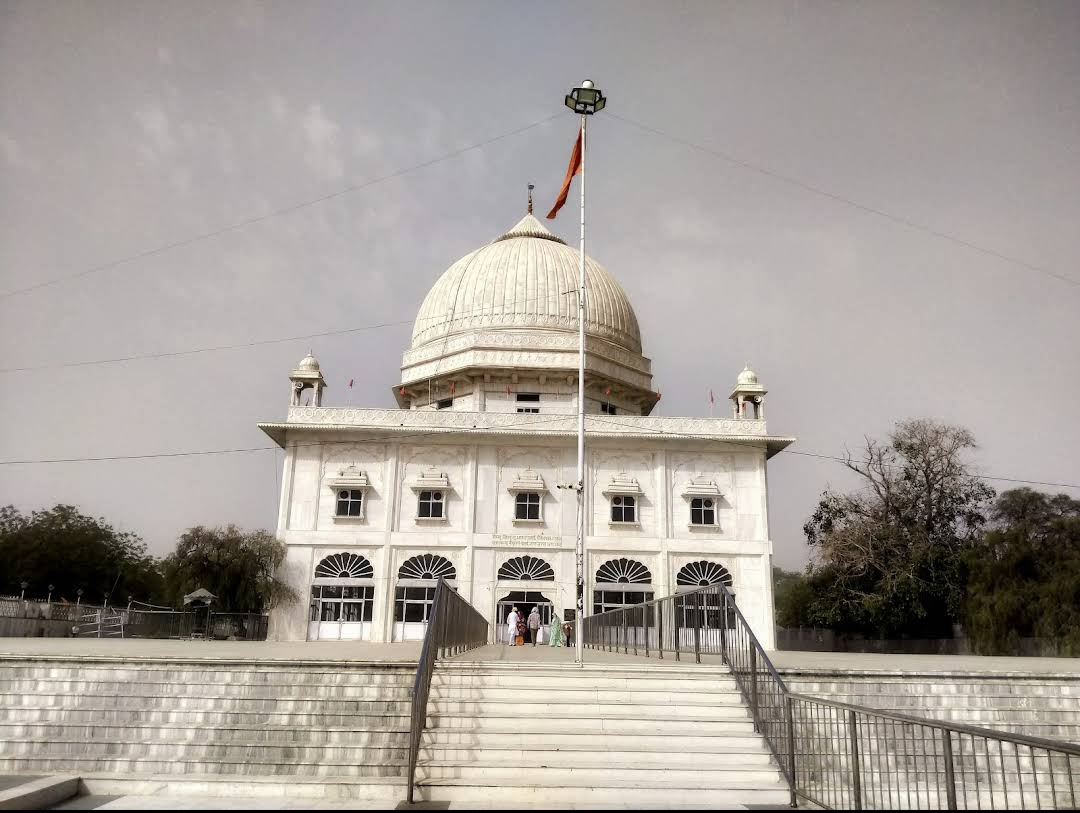
Mukti Dham Mukam

The Bishnoi have various temples and mausolea, of which they consider the holiest to be that in the village of Mukam in Nokha tehsil, Bikaner district, Rajasthan. The sacred sites of the Bishnois are locally known as Sathri or Dhām, located in places that have some connection with Guru Jambheshwar. The Bishnoi poet Govind Ram has said that Sathri means a place that has been 'purified by the feet of Jambhoji'. Later on, some significant places came to be called Dhām. "Open-air shrines located in fields or under trees are called Thān. During those periods of time when the Than is associated with some kind of miracle or super-natural event, the shrine is called Dhām." Main eight shrines of the Bishnois are collectively called Ashtadhām.

Peepasar, in Nagaur, is the birth place of Shri Guru Jambheshwar Bhagwan, Ials called sthal—the site of reincarnation. The place has a residence of Thakur Lohatji, childhood home of Jambhoji and an old Khejri tree. On Janmashtami, also the birthdate of Hindu deity Krishna, is celebrated at Peepasar.

Muktidham Mukam, in Nokha in Bikaner district, is the most important religious place of the Bishnoi community. Jambhoji's last rites were performed here. Bishnois believe that Guruji is still resting here. A beautiful marbled temple is built here which is also called "Taj Mahal of Rajasthan'. An old Khejri tree under which Jambhoji's body was buried is considered sacred and devotees circumambulate around it. To enter the temple one has to cover the head as a mark of respect.

Samrathal Dhora is situated less than three kilometres south of Muktidham Mukam. This is a site where maximum sermons of Shri Guru Jambheshwar Bhagwan were delivered. It is also the site of the origin of the Bishnoi sect. There is a temple at the Samrathal Dhora and one sacred pond.

Lohawat is situated in south of Phalaudi, Jodhpur. There is a legend that Jambhohi gave Darshan to the Jodhpur prince Maldev there. This place also has a temple.

Janglu is a village in Nokha, Bikaner. The Bishnoi temple in this village is of special significance as it has a collection of personal use objects of Jambhoji. There is also a fire altar in the village in which a Havan was performed by Jambhoji.

Rotu village situated in Jayal tehsil of Nagaur district. It is forty five kilometer north of Nagaur. Guru Jambheshwar is believed to have visited the village. A huge shrine of Jambhoji is erected here. A plaque of Jambhoji, called khanda that belonged to his devotee and contemporary Dudoji is preserved in this temple.

Jambha dhām or Jambholav is situated near Phalodi in Phalodi district. This site is known for practical application of teachings of Guru Jambhoji. He got a holy pond dug, which came to be popularly known as Jambha Talaw or Jambh Sarvovar. In common parlance it soon became Jambholav. It is a religious place, almost a pilgrimage site, for Bishnoi community. A fair is held annually on the Chaitra Amavasya following the Indian lunar calendar.

Lalasar is situated South-east of Bikaner. This is the place where Guru Jambhoji died. His body was later taken to Mukam. A grand temple is constructed here very recently through community funding.

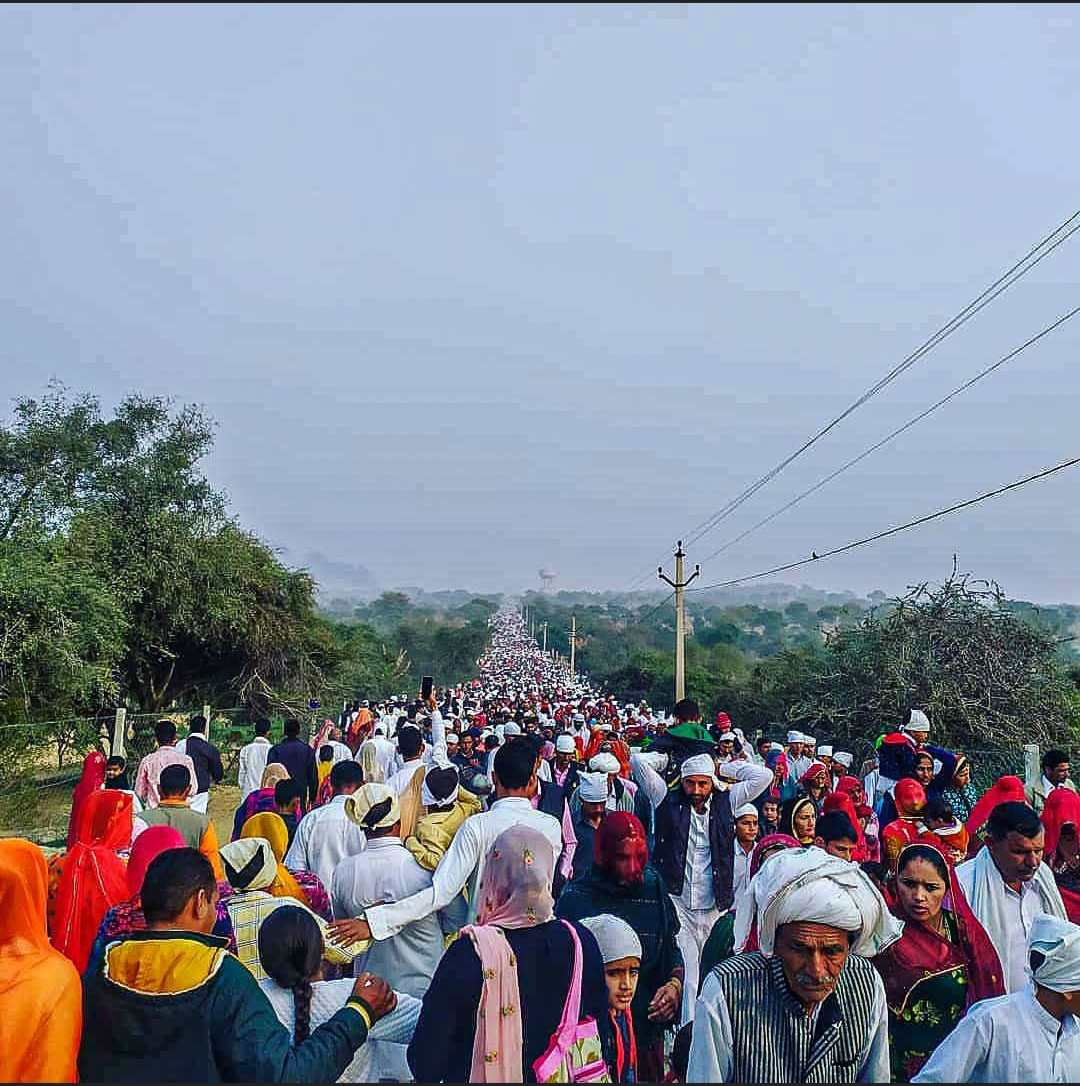
Religious Gathering of Bishnoi at Mukam and Samrathal Dhora.

== Attachment towards living beings ==
Bishnois are known for guarding the flora and fauna of Thar region. They believe that they will be reborn as deer in their afterlife.

=== Khejarli massacre ===
The Bishnoi narrate the story of Amrita Devi, a member of the sect who inspired as many as 363 other Bishnois to go to their deaths in protest of the cutting down of Khejri trees on 12 September 1730. The Maharaja of Jodhpur, Abhay Singh, requiring wood for the construction of a new palace, sent soldiers to cut trees in the village of Khejarli, which was called Jehnad at that time. Noticing their actions, Amrita Devi hugged a tree in an attempt to stop them. Her family then adopted the same strategy, as did other local people when the news spread. She told the soldiers that she considered their actions to be an insult to her faith and that she was prepared to die to save the trees. The soldiers did indeed kill her and others until Abhay Singh was informed of what was going on and intervened to stop the massacre.

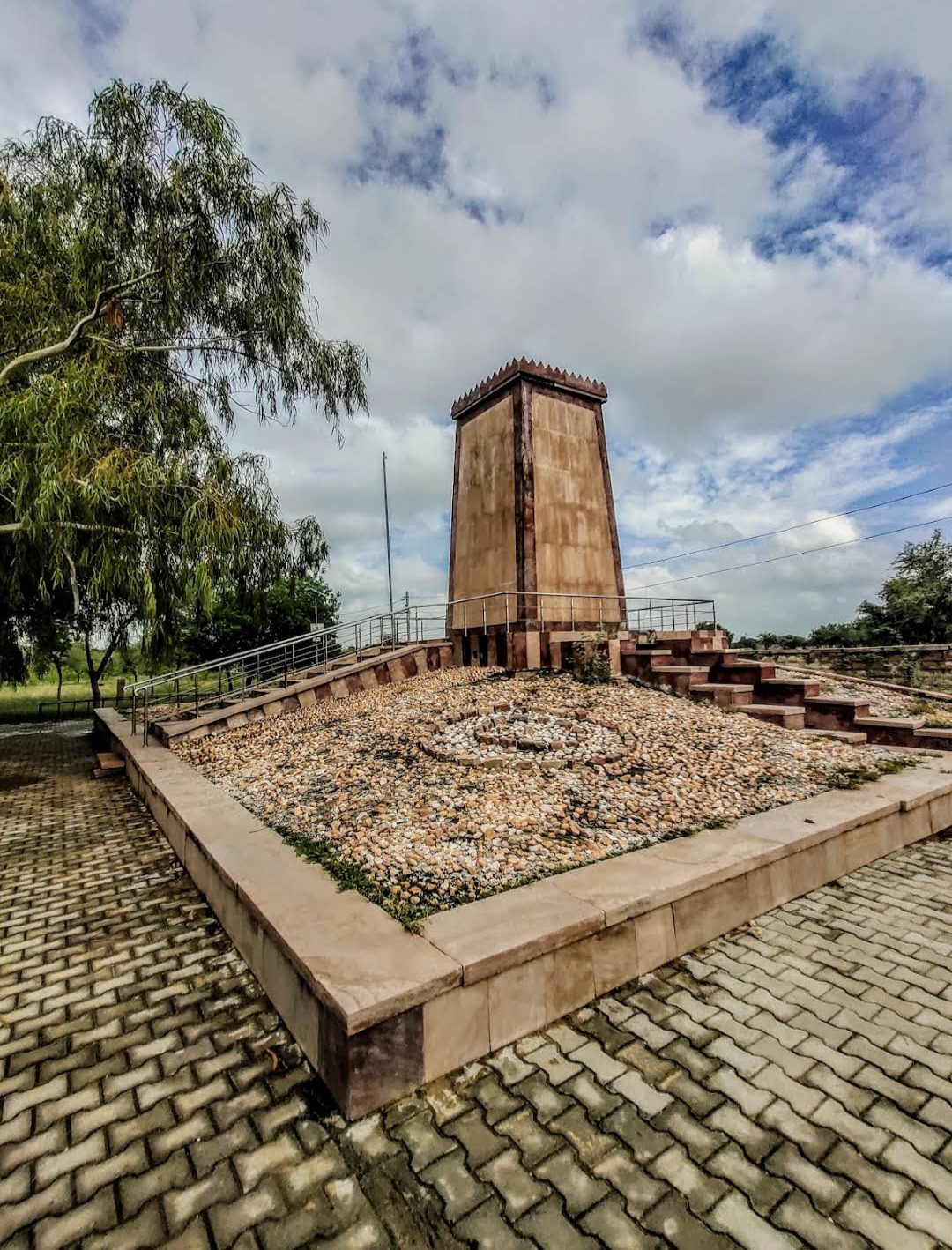
A memorial Commemorating 363 Bishnois died for saving Green Trees Near Khejarli Village, Jodhpur, Rajasthan, India

Some of the 363 Bishnois who were killed protecting the trees were buried in Khejarli, where a simple grave with four pillars was erected. Every year, in September, i.e., Shukla Dashmi of Bhadrapad (Hindi month) the Bishnois assemble there to commemorate the sacrifice made by their people to preserve the trees.

=== Salman Khan's poaching case ===
Bishnois revere and care for most animals including the blackbuck. Bollywood actor Salman Khan allegedly hunted blackbucks in 1998. The members of Bishnoi community are said to have caught him red-handed; protests from the community forced the authorities to arrest and try him. In 2023, gangster Lawrence Bishnoi threatened to kill Salman Khan if he doesn't apologise to the Bishnoi community for killing the blackbucks.

== Notable persons ==
- Amrita Devi, martyr in Khejarli massacre
- Bhajan Lal, former Chief Minister of Haryana
- Bhavya Bishnoi, Indian politician from Haryana
- Chaitanya Bishnoi, Indian cricketer
- Chander Mohan Bishnoi, former deputy chief minister of Haryana
- Jagdish Bishnoi, Indian javelin thrower
- Jaswant Singh Bishnoi, Indian politician from Rajasthan
- Khamu Ram Bishnoi, environmental activist known for his battle against plastic pollution
- Kiran Bishnoi, Indian freestyle wrestler
- KK Vishnoi, Indian politician from Rajasthan
- Kuldeep Bishnoi, Indian politician from Haryana
- Lawrence Bishnoi, an Indian gangster
- Mahendra Bishnoi, Indian politician from Rajasthan
- Poonam Chand Vishnoi, former speaker of the Rajasthan Legislative Assembly
- Radheshyam Bishnoi, Wildlife conservationist and animal rescuer
- Rajesh Bishnoi, Indian cricketer
- Ram Narayan Bishnoi, former cabinet minister in Rajasthan
- Ram Singh Bishnoi, Indian politician from Rajasthan
- Ranaram Bishnoi, environmentalist from Jodhpur
- Ravi Bishnoi, Indian international cricketer
- Renuka Bishnoi, Indian politician from Haryana
- Shweta Bishnoi, Indian cricketer
- Sukhram Bishnoi, Indian politician from Rajasthan
- Vijay Bishnoi, Chief Justice of Gauhati High Court

== See also ==
- Chipko movement
- Guru Jambeshwar University of Science and Technology
- Guru Jambheshwar
- Amrita Devi Bishnoi National Award
