= Dudi =

Dudi is a name.

== In the military ==
- Dudi of Basra (Militant leader) also entitled as David of Basra was a 3rd century crusader and religious preacher to spread Christianity in India

== People ==
=== Clan organisation ===
Dudi also Dhudi is dynastically an heritable gotra found among the Royal household of Panwar kinsman and considered as one of the divisional sub-class among the Jat Sikh community, which tactically hold various landholdings and remain politically active within the governmental affairs of Rajasthan. They emerged as the disingenuous identity and eradicate the corrupted system of Brahmins and don’t allow lower-tier Hindu priest to enter the local gurdwaras which constraining the old traditions alive to reintroduce Anand Karaj Act for Sikh religiosity.

== People with the surname ==
- Nadia Arop Dudi, (born 1971), South Sudanese politician
- Rameshwar Lal Dudi, Indian politician
- Ramnarayan Dudi, Indian politician
- Sushila Dudi, Indian activist and politician
- Chetan Dudi, Indian politician

== People with the given name ==
Dudi is a diminutive of Dawid, the Hebrew form of David.

- Dudi Appleton, American journalist
- Dudi Sela (born 1985), Israeli tennis player

== See also ==
- Dudhi
- Rajasthani people
