= Sanctuary Asia =

Indian wildlife conservation magazine

- Editor: Bittu Sahgal
- Categories: Wildlife, conservation, ecology
- Frequency: Monthly (including editions for young readers)
- Founded: 1981; 45 years ago
- Company: Sanctuary Nature Foundation
- Country: India
- Based in: Mumbai
- Website: www.sanctuaryasia.com/index.php

Sanctuary Asia is an Indian nature and wildlife conservation magazine founded in 1981 by Bittu Sahgal, its current editor. The magazine expanded in 2015 to become established as a non-profit foundation (Sanctuary Nature Foundation).

Sanctuary Nature Foundation also publishes other conservation-focused reading material, like coffee table books and national park guides.

== History ==
Editor Bittu Sahgal founded the magazine Sanctuary Asia in 1981 at the suggestion of Fateh Singh Rathore, the Field Director of Ranthambore National Park, urging him to educate the Indian citizen on the importance of wildlife conservation. After receiving support nationwide, a second magazine was launched in 1984 for a younger audience, Sanctuary Cub.

In the 1980s, Sanctuary Films produced the television shows Project Tiger and Rakshak.

In the early 1990s, the magazine began to syndicate some of its articles to reach a wider audience. the Sanctuary Photo Library was founded in 1990.

Since 2000, the organization has run several projects, including the Kids For Tigers programme, which has reached rural and urban children across 500 schools in 20 Indian cities through nature walks, fests and workshops.

It was in 2015 that Sanctuary Asia established Sanctuary Nature Foundation, the nonprofit foundation that now publishes the magazines and several other publications and also leads conservation projects.

== Publications ==
Both Cub and Asia publish six editions a year each.

=== Sanctuary Asia ===
Its first edition was published in October 1981. The bi-monthly publication prints stories and photographs by scientists, conservationists, naturalists, photographers, filmmakers and writers. The primary aim of the magazine is to communicate the urgent rationale for environment protection.

=== Sanctuary Cub ===
First published in 1984 by its current editor Tara Sahgal, Sanctuary Cub was begun with the belief that a love for the environment and keen interest in conservation needs to be instilled in every child at a young age, encouraging them to get involved hands-on through volunteer programmes, events, nature camps and internships.

=== Other publications ===
Aside from the magazines, the foundation publishes various other material, like coffee table books and guidebooks on wildlife sanctuaries and national parks across the country.

== Contributors ==
Following is a list of some of Sanctuary Asia's key contributors (both photographers and writers).

- Bikram Grewal
- Peter Jackson
- George Archibald
- Dr AJT Johnsingh
- Lavkumar Khachar
- Shekar Dattatri
- Renee Borges
- Fateh Singh Rathore
- Salim Ali
- Dhritiman Mukherjee
- Prerna Singh Bindra
- Valmik Thapar
- Romulus Whitaker
- Billy Arjan Singh
- HS Panwar
- Kailash Sankhala
- Ullas Karanth
- Sunderlal Bahuguna
- Isaac Kehimkar
- Kalyan Varma
- Sandesh Kadur
- Madhaviah Krishnan
- N A Naseer
- Ravi Sankaran
- Rishad Naoroji
- Valmik Thapar
- Belinda Wright
- Aishwarya Sridhar

== Photography ==
Sanctuary Asia has been using photography as a conservation tool since the first issue, through the publication and the annual photography awards. Editor Bittu Sahgal believes that "wildlife photography is a conservation tool. Images have the power to communicate across language barriers. Sanctuary regards photographers and photography as a critical foundation on which the world's conservation movement has been built."

== Awards ==
The Sanctuary Wildlife Awards are held annually at the end of each year to honour Indian conservationists and naturalists who do exceptional work. The recipients of these ongoing awards later find their work bolstered by many quarters.

As a natural corollary, the Sanctuary Nature Foundation's Mud on Boots programme has been providing small grants to grassroots conservationists in the most remote corners of the country since 2016. The Foundation also holds the Wildlife Photography Awards to applaud deserving photographers, drawing thousands of entries from all over Asia. This led to the recent institution of the Sanctuary Wildlife Photography Festival.
