= Mukti Dham Mukam =

Hindu temple in Rajasthan, India

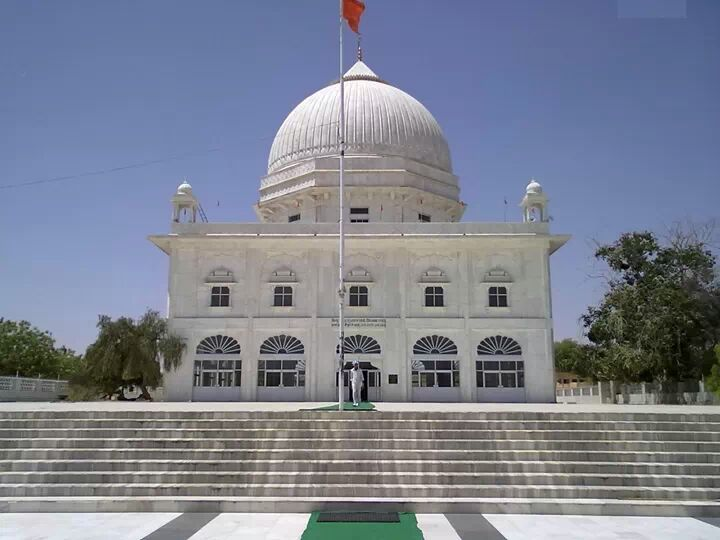

- Location within Rajasthan Mukti Dham Mukam (India)

Religion
- Affiliation: Hinduism
- District: Bikaner district
- Deity: Guru Jambheshwar Bhagwan
- Festivals: Two fairs annually: one on the Amavasya of Phalgun and the other on the Amavasya of Asoj

Location
- Location: Mukam, Nokha tehsil, Bikaner district
- State: Rajasthan
- Interactive map of Mukti Dham Mukam
- Coordinates: 27.625393°N 73.618370°E

Architecture
- Style: Sikh architecture
- Founder: Randhir Ji Babal, who was a disciple of Jambhoji
- Groundbreaking: Paush Sudi Dwitiya Monday in Vikram Samvat 1593 (1536)
- Completed: four years later on Chaitra Sudi Saptami Friday (1540)

Mukti Dham Mukam is a pilgrimage site near Talwa village, now known as Mukaam, in the Nokha tehsil of Bikaner district, Rajasthan, India. It holds immense significance for the Bishnoi community, being the final resting place of Sri Guru Jambheshwar Bhagwan, also known as Jambhoji. The site is revered as the sacred Samadhi of Guru Jambheshwar, where devotees gather to pay their respects and seek salvation.

== History ==
According to legend, Guru Jambheshwar Bhagwan designated the spot for his holy Samadhi before ascending to heaven. He instructed his followers to dig 24 hands near the khejdi tree, where they discovered Bhagwan Shiva's trident and damru. The shrine was then built at this location, which later became known as Mukti Dham Mukam. The khejdi tree still stands as a symbol of reverence, and devotees worship it during their visits.

After Guru Jambheshwar's departure, his mortal remains were placed above the ground, suspended by the khejdi tree, until the trident and drum were unearthed and the shrine was established. Over time, the shrine was renovated and expanded into a grand temple, known as the personal temple of Guru Jambheshwar.

== Festivals and traditions ==
Two major fairs are held annually at Mukti Dham Mukam: one on the Amavasya of Phalgun and the other on the new moon day of Asoj. These fairs attract a large number of devotees from the Bishnoi community, who gather to participate in rituals, pay homage to Guru Jambheshwar, and seek blessings for salvation.

During the fairs, devotees engage in various rituals, including the performance of havans, offerings of clarified butter and coconuts, and the feeding of grains to birds. Additionally, a tradition of free food distribution has been established, reflecting the community's spirit of service and hospitality.

== Location and accessibility ==
Mukti Dham Mukam is located in the Muqam village of Nokha tehsil, approximately 16 km from Nokha and 63 km from the district headquarters of Bikaner. The site is easily accessible by road and serves as a significant religious landmark for the Bishnoi community.
