= Randhisar =

Randhisar is a small village and a Panchayat in Churu district in the state of Rajasthan, India. It is located in the Shekhawati region. The local language is Hindi. It is 220 km from Jaipur and situated on the road from Ratangarh to Sujangarh. The village of Randhisar lies in Sujangarh tehsil of Churu district. The nearest Railway station is Chappar, which lies on Degana-Churu-Rewari broad gauge rail line. The nearest airport is in Sanganer, 225 km away. Randhisar is famous for the mining industry and good quality of building material grit. Most of the residents are Rajpurohit, who maintain traditions similar to the Brahmins and Rajputs. The Sarpanch (head of the village) is Bhawani Singh Randhisar. There are three temples associated with the village: Ambe Maa Temple, Shivdayalya Temple, Thakur Ji Temple, and Balaji Temple. It also has the distinction of being Sujangarh District's first ODF (Open Defecation Free) village.

According to the 2011 Census, the location code of Randhisar village is 070728. The total geographical area is approximately 1960.91 hectares. As of 2011, there are 481 families residing in the village with a total population of 2,734. 1,416 are male and 1,318 are female. The literacy rate of Randhisar is 60%; however, the female literacy rate is 46.08%. The growth of population is down 1.7% and the population density is 139 people per kilometer.

== Nearby villages ==
Nearby villages include:

- Kalero Ki Dhani
- Dhadheru Bhamuwan
- Dhadheru Godaran
- Jogliya
- Dhatri
- Bothiyabas
- Udasar
- Chadwas
- Balera
- Kodasar Bidwatam
