= Kanhaiya Lal Jhanwar =

Indian politician

Member of Rajasthan Legislative Assembly
- In office 2008–2013
- Preceded by: Govind Ram Meghwal
- Succeeded by: Rameshwar Lal Dudi
- Constituency: Nokha

Kanhaiya Lal Jhanwar is an Indian politician from Rajasthan. He is a former member of Rajasthan Legislative Assembly, and was elected to represent Nokha Assembly Constituency in 2008 as an Independent Politician. He had to face defeat in the 2023 Rajasthan Legislative Assembly elections.
