= Govind Ram Meghwal =

Indian politician (born 1962)

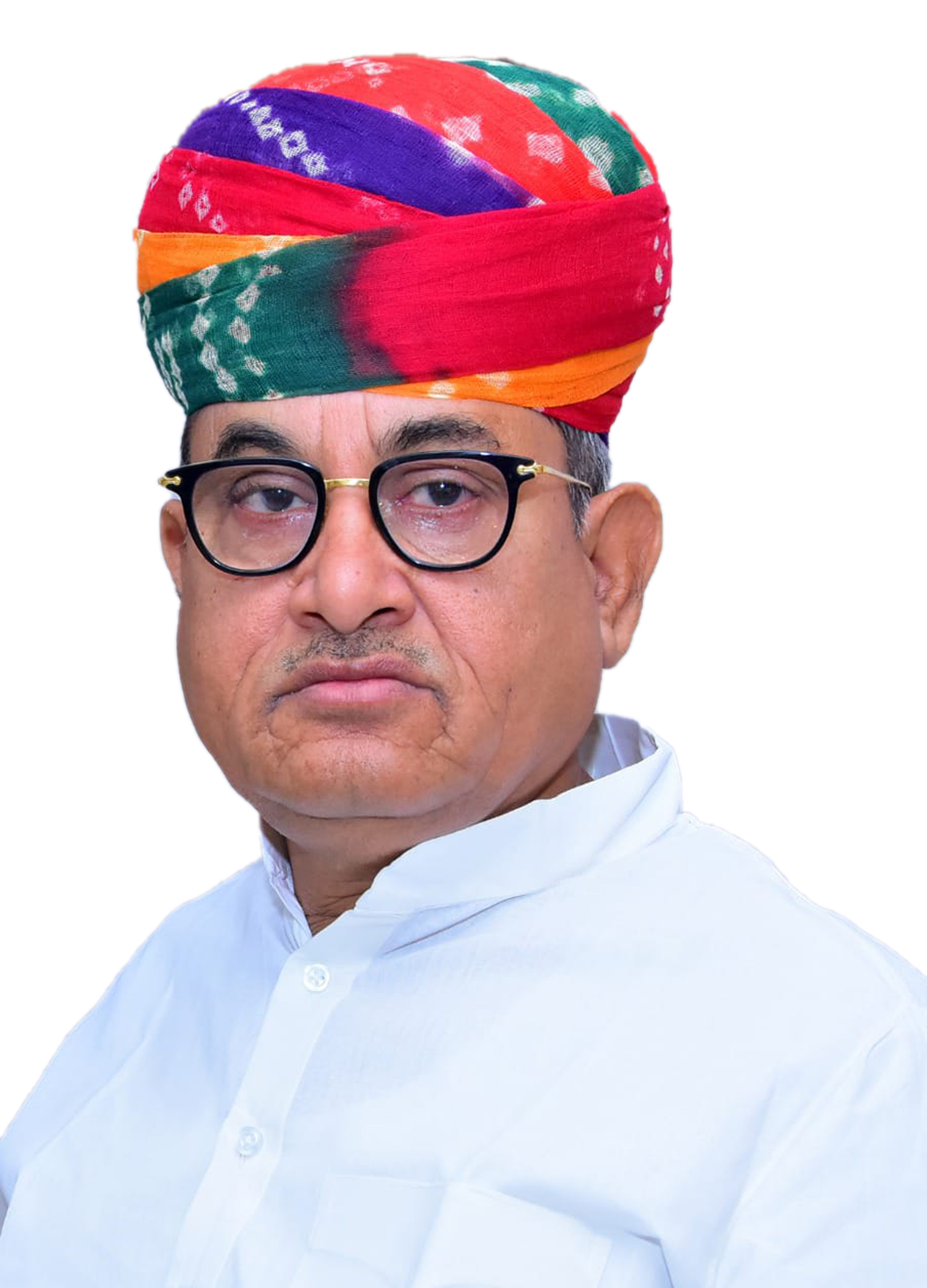

Cabinet Minister of Disaster Management and Relief, Administrative reforms and coordination Statistics Department Government of Rajasthan
- In office November 2021 – 3 December 2023
- Governor: Kalraj Mishra
- Chief Minister: Ashok Gahlot

Member of the Rajasthan Legislative Assembly
- In office 2018–2023
- Succeeded by: Vishwanath Meghwal
- Constituency: Khajuwala
- In office 2003–2008
- Preceded by: Rewant Ram Panwar
- Succeeded by: Kanhaiya Lal Jhanwar
- Constituency: Nokha

Vice President Rajasthan Pradesh Congress Committee
- Incumbent
- Assumed office January 2021

Parliamentary Secretary, Government of Rajasthan
- In office 2003-2008

Personal details
- Born: 20 January 1962 (age 64) Poogal, Rajasthan, India
- Party: Indian National Congress
- Spouse: Asha
- Parent: Tikuram
- Occupation: Agriculture
- Profession: Politician

Govind Ram Meghwal (born 20 January 1962) is an Indian politician from Indian National Congress. He is Former Cabinet Minister for Disaster Management & Relief, Administrative Reforms and Coordination, Statistic Policy Planning Department in Government of Rajasthan and Former Member of Rajasthan Legislative Assembly from Khajuwala. He got elected as an MLA from Nokha, Bikaner first in 2003 and then again in 2018 from Khajuwala. He has also served as the Parliamentary secretary, State Minister Government of Rajasthan from 2003 to 2008. He was made the Vice President of Rajasthan Pradesh Congress Committee in January 2021.

== Personal life ==
Govind Ram Meghwal was born to Shri Tikuram in Poogal, Bikaner, a village in Rajasthan, on 20 January 1962. He is married to Smt. Asha. He holds a degree in Master of Arts.

=== Positions held ===
Year	Position
2003–08	Member, Twelfth Rajasthan Legislative Assembly from Nokha, Bikaner: Parliamentary secretary, Rajasthan Vidhan Sabha (with State Minister Status)
2018–2023	Member, Fifteenth Rajasthan Legislative Assembly from Khajuwala: Cabinet Minister For Disaster Management & Relief Department, Government of Rajasthan; Cabinet Minister For Administrative Reforms and Coordination Department Government of Rajasthan; Cabinet Minister For Statistic Policy Planning Department, Government of Rajasthan
