= Mukam, Rajasthan =

Mukam Mukam Mukti Dham
- Town
- Mukam
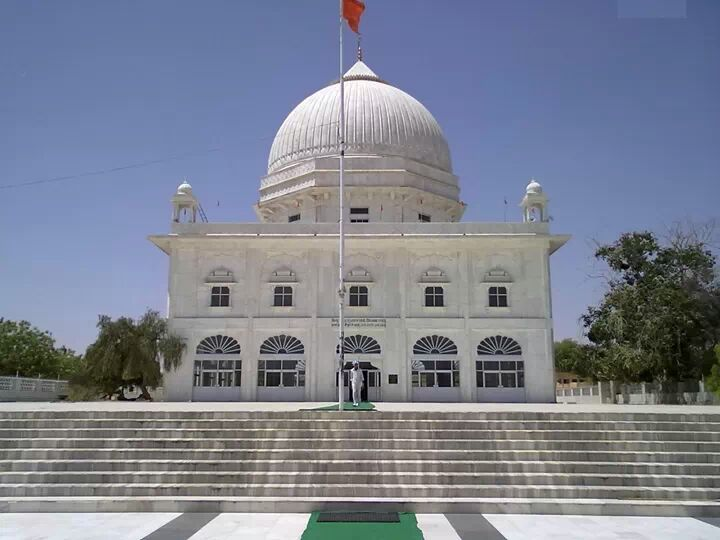
- Nickname: Taalwa
- Coordinates: 27.6239621°N 73.5425233°E
- Country: India
- State: Rajasthan
- District: Bikaner

Government
  - Body: municipality
  - Rank: N/a
- Time zone: UTC+5:30 (IST)
- Postal code: 334803
- Vehicle registration: RJ-50

Mukam is a village, and most sacred site of Mukam Mukti Dham temple of Bishnoi community, located on Bikaner-Jodhpur State Highway 20 about 10 mi (16.09 km) from Nokha and 40 mi (64.37 km) from Bikaner in Bikaner district in the Indian state of Rajasthan.

== Mukam Mukti Dham ==
The Bishnoi sect was founded by Guru Jambeshwar. He left his home after his parents' death in 1483 and founded the Bishnoi community in 1485 at a sandy hill known as Samrathal. He preached the twenty nine (20+9) rules including protection of all living beings and green trees. Mukam Mukti Dham is a Bishnoi temple built over his samadhi.

== See also ==
- Badopal, Haryana
- Bhakti movement
- Chipko movement
- Khejarli massacre
- Guru Jambheshwar University of Science and Technology
- Maqam (shrine)
