= Khajuwala Assembly constituency =

Legislative Assembly constituency in Rajasthan

Coordinates: 28.70°N 72.59°E

Khajuwala
- Constituency No. 12 for the Rajasthan Legislative Assembly

Constituency details
- Country: India
- Region: North India
- State: Rajasthan
- District: Bikaner district
- Established: 2008
- Reservation: SC

Member of Legislative Assembly
- 16th Rajasthan Legislative Assembly
- Incumbent Vishwanath Meghwal
- Party: BJP
- Elected year: 2023

Khajuwala Assembly constituency is one of constituencies of Rajasthan Legislative Assembly in the Bikaner Lok Sabha constituency. The constituency covers all voters from Khajuwala tehsil, Poogal tehsil, Chhatargarh tehsil and parts of Bikaner tehsil, which includes ILRC Kanasar and Chak Garbi, Nalbari and Udasar of ILRC Bikaner. As of 2023, it is represented by Vishwanath Meghwal of the Bharatiya Janata Party.

== Members of the Legislative Assembly ==
| Year | Member | Party |
|---|---|---|
| 2008 | Vishwanath Meghwal | Bharatiya Janata Party |
| 2013 | Vishwanath Meghwal | Bharatiya Janata Party |
| 2018 | Govind Ram Meghwal | Indian National Congress |
| 2023 | Vishwanath Meghwal | Bharatiya Janata Party |

== Election results ==
=== 2023 ===
2023 Rajasthan Legislative Assembly election: Khajuwala
| Party | Candidate | Votes | % | ±% |
|---|---|---|---|---|
| BJP | Vishwanath Meghwal | 91,276 | 51.47 | +17.64 |
| INC | Govindram Meghwal | 73,902 | 41.67 | −12.42 |
| JJP | Sitaram | 3,953 | 2.23 | |
| RLP | Jaiprakash | 2,421 | 1.37 | −5.0 |
| NOTA | None of the above | 2,062 | 1.16 | −0.23 |
| Majority | | 17,374 | 9.8 | −10.46 |
| Turnout | | 177,351 | 74.88 | +1.19 |
| BJP gain from INC | | Swing | | |

=== 2018 ===
2018 Rajasthan Legislative Assembly election: Khajuwala
| Party | Candidate | Votes | % | ±% |
|---|---|---|---|---|
| INC | Govindram Meghwal | 82,994 | 54.09 | |
| BJP | Vishwanath | 51,905 | 33.83 | |
| RLP | Mithu Singh | 9,779 | 6.37 | |
| BSP | Gordhan Ram | 1,945 | 1.27 | |
| Independent | Lalit Mohan | 1,639 | 1.07 | |
| NOTA | None of the above | 2,130 | 1.39 | |
| Majority | | 31,089 | 20.26 | |
| Turnout | | 153,435 | 73.69 | |
| INC gain from BJP | | Swing | | |

== See also ==
- Bikaner district
- List of constituencies of the Rajasthan Legislative Assembly
