= Bikram Grewal =

Indian birdwatcher

Bikram Grewal is an ornithologist, author, birdwatcher and conservationist from Delhi, India who has written several guides to Indian birds. His father was a senior civil servant in the Indian government. He has been working with governments and private groups to promote Eco-tourism in Madhya Pradesh, Arunachal and Nagaland. His 2002 book Birds of India has been a best-seller among Indian bird books. He has also been part of the Inheritance Series brought out by Sanctuary Asia.

== Books by Bikram Grewal ==
1. Insight Guides : India (1988)
2. A Photographic Guide to Birds of the Himalayas (with Otto Pfister, 1999)
3. Photographic guide to birds of India (2002)
4. Atlas of Birds of Delhi and Haryana (2006)
5. The Sundarbans Inheritance (with Bittu Sahgal and Sumit Sen),
6. The Bharatpur Inheritance (with Bittu Sahgal), and
7. The Corbett Inheritance (with Brijendra Singh and Bittu Sahgal)
