= Guru Jambheshwar =

Founder of Bishnoi Vaishnava tradition

Guru‌ Jambhes‌hwar‌
- गुरु‌ जम्भेश्वर‌
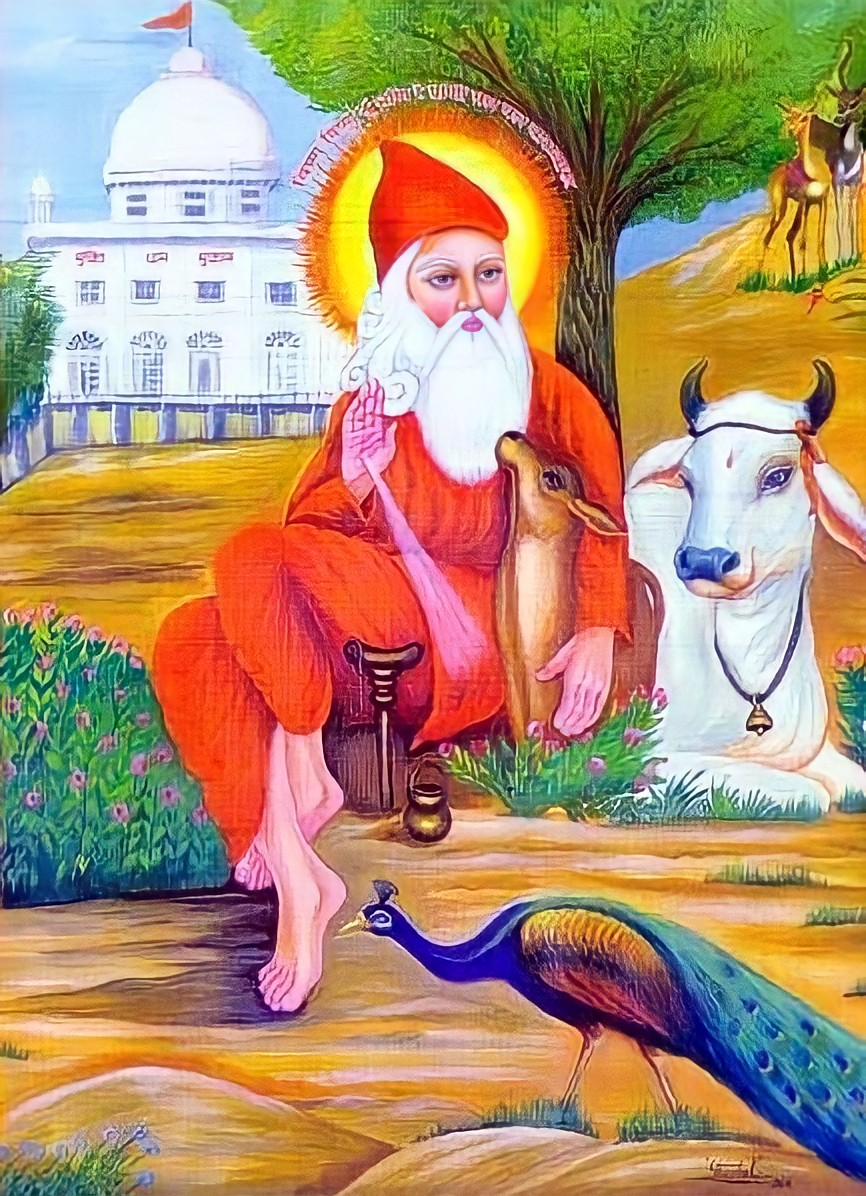
- Depiction of Guru Jambheshwar (Jambhoji)

Personal life
- Born: 1451 Pipasar, Nagaur District, Rajasthan, India
- Died: 1536 (aged 84–85) Mukam, Bikaner district, Rajasthan, India
- Resting place: Mukti Dham Mukam, Mukam, Nokha tehsil, Bikaner district, Rajasthan
- Parent(s): Lohat Panwar (father); Hansa Devi (mother)
- Region: Thar Desert‌
- Known for: Founding the Bishnoi Panth‌
- Other name: Jambhoji‌

Religious life
- Religion: Sanatan Dharm‌ (Hinduism)
- Denomination: Vaishnavism
- Movement: Bhakti Movement‌

Guru Jambheshwar, also known as Guru Jambhoji, (1451–1536) was a sadhak, yogi, saint and the founder of the Bishnoi Panth, a Vaishnavite sect noted for its devotion to Vishnu, emphasis on non-violence, and ethos of environmental conservation in the arid regions of Rajasthan, India. In 1485, inspired by a severe drought, he laid down 29 guiding principles—spanning personal conduct, devotional practice, and ecological stewardship—and composed 120 verses (Shabadwani), through which he shaped a faith centered on compassion for all living beings.

== Biography ==
‌Jambheshwar was born into a Panwar Rajput family in the village of Pipasar in Nagaur in 1451. He was the only child of Lohat Panwar and Hansa Devi. For the first seven years of his life, Guru Jambeshwar was considered silent and introverted. He spent 27 years of his life as a cow herder.

== Founding Bishnoi Panth ==
Aged 34, Guru Jambheshwar founded the Bishnoi sub-sect of Vaishnavism at Samrathal Dhora. His teachings were in the poetic form known as Shabadwani. He preached for the next 51 years, travelling across the country, and produced 120 Shabads, or verses, of Shabadwani. The sect was founded after the big draught in Rajasthan in 1485. He had laid down 29 principles to be followed by the sect. Killing animals and felling trees were banned. The Khejri tree (Prosopis cineraria), is also considered to be sacred by the Bishnois.

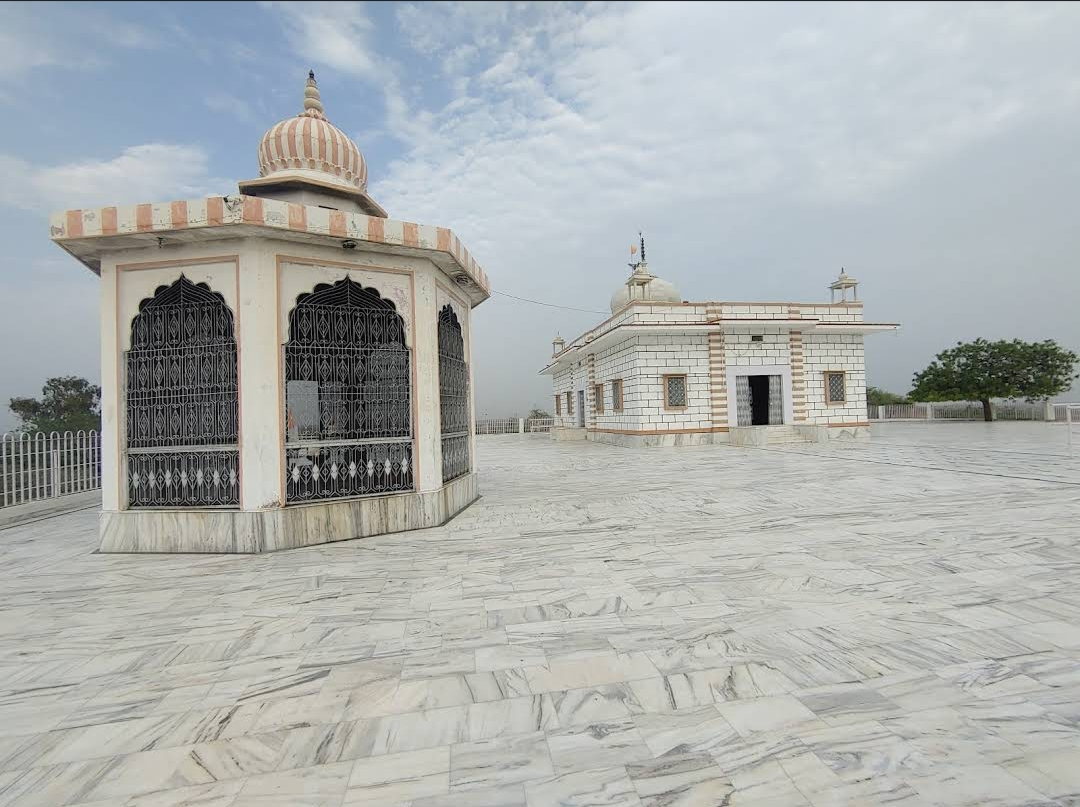
Bishnoi Temple at Samrathal Dhora

Bishnoi panth revolves around 29 rules. Of these, eight prescribe to preserve biodiversity and encourage good animal husbandry, seven provide directions for healthy social behaviour, and ten are directed towards personal hygiene and maintaining basic good health. The other four commandments provide guidelines for worshipping Vishnu daily.

== Legacy and commemoration ==
The Bishnoi have various temples, of which they consider the most holy to be "Mukti Dham mukam "in the village of Mukam in Nokha tehsil, Bikaner district, Rajasthan. It is there where the most sacred Bishnoi temple is built over samadhi of Guru Jambeshwar. Guru Jambeshwar University of Science and Technology at Hisar in the state of Haryana is named after him.

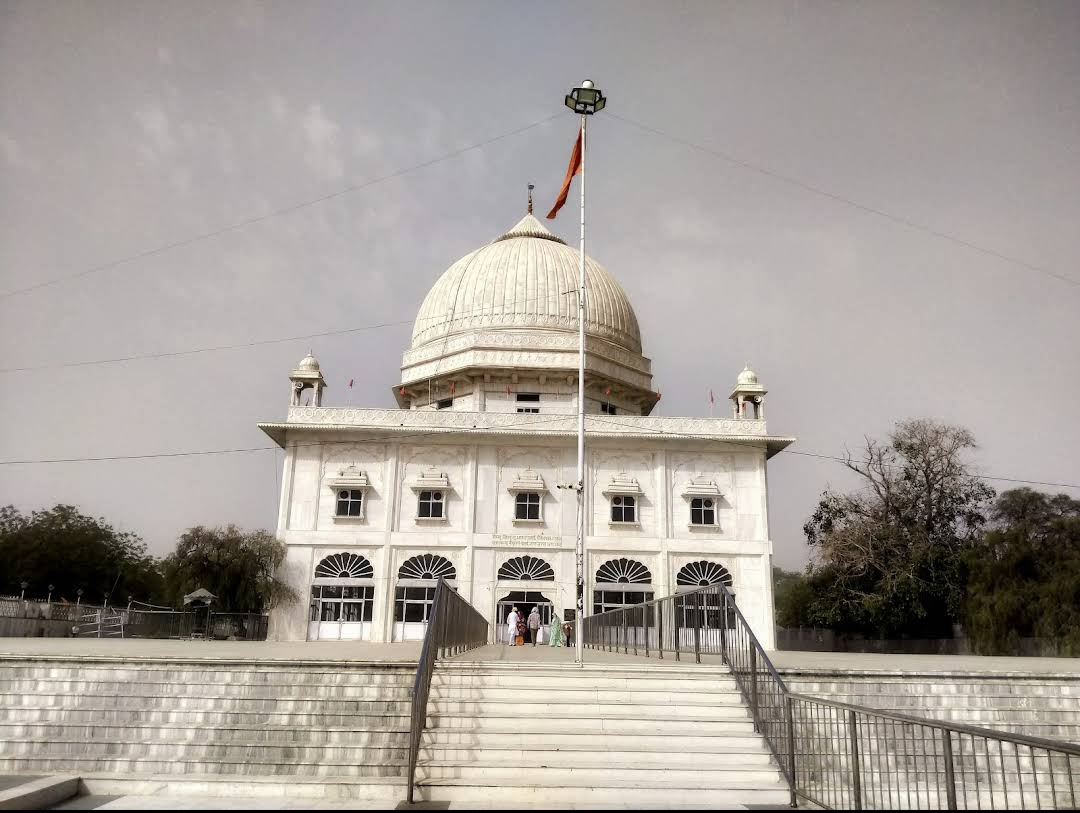
Bishnoi Temple in Mukam, Nokha.

== See also ==
- Bhakti movement
- Chipko movement
- Khejarli Massacre
