= The Bera Bond =

2021 non-fiction book by Sundeep Bhutoria

- Author: Sundeep Bhutoria
- Language: English
- Subject: wildlife book
- Genre: coffee-table book
- Publisher: Pan Macmillan
- Publication date: 2021
- Publication place: India
- Media type: hardbound book
- Pages: 160
- ISBN: 9789389104189

The Bera Bond is a coffee-table book by Indian author and philanthropist Sundeep Bhutoria. It was published by Pan Macmillan in 2021. The photographs in the book were taken by conservationist and photographer Shatrunjay Pratap Singh.

== Background ==
Rajasthan-born Sundeep Bhutoria is an author of The Safari, Aap Biti Jag Biti, My Life My Travels, and China Diary. After the publication of his 2020 book, Calcuttascape: Musings of a Globetrotter, Sundeep Bhutoria published The Bera Bond. The book presents a personal account of author's exploration of the Jawai-Bera region of Rajasthan. Bera, a small village, is located in Pali district of Rajasthan in the Aravalli Range. It is famous for the peaceful co-existence of around 55 leopards with villagers. The Bera Bond is an outcome of the author's three-day stay in the Jawai-Bera region, and he acknowledges that the information in the book comes from secondary sources. Bhutoria explained that his main aim behind writing this book was 'to inspire people to save the big cats'.

The Bera Bond is published by Pan Macmillan in 2021, with the photographs taken by Bera-based conservationist and photographer Shatrunjay Pratap Singh, who also served as author's guide. The hardbound book is spanned in 160 pages. Victor Banerjee wrote the introduction of the book, and the foreword has been written by Bittu Sahgal.

== Reception ==
Harsh Vardhan and Shrestha Saha reviewed The Bera Bond in The Telegraph. Harsh Vardhan called it 'A bible for India's least-sung predator in India'. Shrestha Saha commented that the author has discovered 'a glorious side to the Indian wildlife with this coffee table book that would make for a great addition to any bookshelf'.
