= Rapperiya Baalam =

Rapperiya Balam रेपरिया बालम
- Born: February 4, 1992 (age 34); Jaipur, Rajasthan, India
- Genre: Rajasthani Folk

Ashok Manda Bishnoi, better known by his stage name Rapperiya Baalam, is a rapper, songwriter, music composer, and producer based in Jaipur, Rajasthan. He rose to fame in 2014 with his song "Mharo Rajasthan", a folk–hip hop fusion song featuring Swaroop Khan.

His other hits are "Hariyala Banna", "Jaipur Anthem", "Des Padharo Sa", and "Dil Mere". He, along with lyricist Kunaal Vermaa, has worked with Bollywood playback singer Ravindra Upadhyay on the song "Des Padharo Sa", and with musician Mohit Gaur on the song "Phir Dil Se Pukaar Tu". Better known for his experiments in Rajasthani folk music, Rapperiya Baalamand and his team created "Hariyala Banna" in 2016. "Hariyala Banna" is sung by Upadhyay and Kamal Choudhary. In 2018, as part of Swagsthaan (Hindi: स्वेगस्थान) with Ravindra Upadhyay, Sumer Dangi, and Saurabh Parihar, Rapperiya appeared on season 8 of India's Got Talent Currently his songs Shoorveer 1,2 and 3 along with Shoorveer Sambhaji Maharaja are the most heard songs.

== Early life ==
Bishnoi was born on 4 February 1992 at Dabla, Raisinghnagar, Rajasthan to a Zamindar Bishnoi family. His birth name is Ashok Manda. After completing primary school in Raisinghnagar, he moved to Jaipur in 2006 for secondary and college education. He started learning keyboard and piano in 2012.

== Albums ==
Year	Album	Artist/singer	Lyrics	Music producer	Composer
2010	Illegal nation	Raperiya Baalam, Meetu Solanki, Gargi Banerjee	Rapperiya Baalam, Daulat Vaid	Rapperiya Baalam	Rapperiya Baalam
2012	Mahi vey	Ravindra Upadhyay, Amit Sana, Shreyas Shukla, Amit Senger, Bundu Khan, Kunaal Vermaa, Rapperiya Baalam, Meetu Solanki, Sam Mittra, Vikram Singh	Kunaal Vermaa Rapperiya Baalam	Rapperiya Baalam Dev Basak Debu	Kunaal Vermaa Rapperiya Baalam

== Shoorveer licensing dispute ==
In September 2026, shortly after the theatrical release of Mirzapur: The Movie on 4 September, Bishnoi objected to the use of his song "Shoorveer" in the film. In a video posted on Instagram, he stated that the film's makers, Excel Entertainment, had not sought his permission to use the song, and criticised its placement in a sequence featuring the film's gangster characters, saying the song had been composed as a tribute to Maharana Pratap.

Trouper Records, the label that released the song, responded with a statement that "Shoorveer" had been officially licensed to Excel Entertainment for in-film use, and credited Bishnoi as the song's singer and composer. Bishnoi subsequently sent a legal notice to Excel Entertainment seeking the removal of the song from the film and a public apology. Excel Entertainment did not publicly respond to his claims.

The dispute drew political attention in Rajasthan; BJP leader Rajendra Rathore wrote to the Central Board of Film Certification seeking the removal of the song from the film, arguing that its use alongside criminal characters was disrespectful to Maharana Pratap's legacy.
