= Bittu Sahgal =

Indian environmental activist and writer

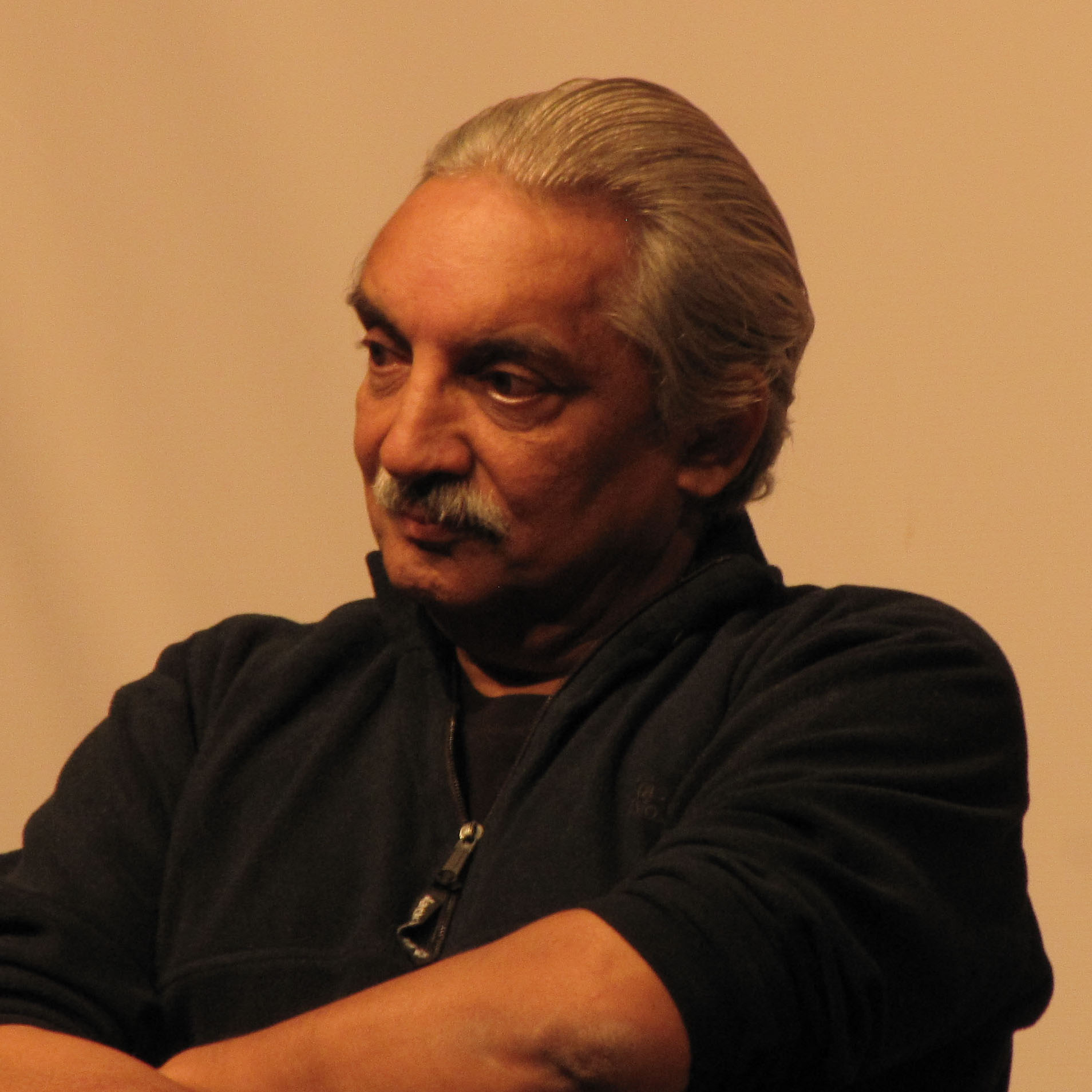
- Born: October 12, 1947 (age 79); Shimla
- Education: B.Com
- Occupations: Writer, environmental activist
- Years active: 1981–present
- Employer: Sanctuary Nature Foundation
- Spouse: Madhu Sahgal
- Children: 2

Bittu Sahgal is an environmental activist, writer, and the founder of Sanctuary Nature Foundation, an Indian nonprofit conservation organization that works on environmental policy, advocacy, science, on-ground support and habitat management. He is also the founding editor of Sanctuary Asia, a wildlife and ecology magazine.

== Early life ==
Sahgal was born on 12 October 1947 in Shimla, where he attended from Bishop Cotton School. He graduated with a B.Com from St Xavier's College, Kolkata. He worked at a chartered accountancy firm during this time. He resigned later and moved to Mumbai, where he currently lives. He has been associated with Project Tiger since its inception and was greatly influenced by Dr. Salim Ali, the famous "Birdman of India", Kailash Sankhala, the first director of Project Tiger and renowned conservationist Fateh Singh Rathore, the former field director at Ranthambhore Tiger Reserve.

== Career ==
After Sahgal moved to Mumbai, he began working as an advertising professional. Over the years, he became a regular visitor to wildlife sanctuaries and national parks around the country. His interest in wildlife conservation grew through interactions with locals on his trips. In 1980, Rathore urged Sahgal to start a wildlife magazine, stressing on the importance of educating the public. The first issue of Sanctuary Asia was published the following year in October. In 1984, he founded Sanctuary Cub, to reach a younger audience. Cub is currently edited by his younger daughter, Tara Sahgal.

In the year 2000, Sahgal instituted the Sanctuary Wildlife Awards to honour men and women working on groundbreaking projects in the conservation sector and excelling wildlife photographers. Later in 2017, a separate Awards event for photography, the Sanctuary Wildlife Photography Awards, was established solely to promote wildlife conservation through photography.

On the urging of Cara Tejpal, Sahgal established the Mud on Boots project in 2017, which seeks to empower grassroots conservationists in India. These conservationists often come from humble backgrounds, and find themselves limited in their ability to expand and fund their work because of the challenges posed by language barriers, geographical remoteness and restricted access to technology and education. These individuals are identified for Sanctuary by credible conservation leaders. The same year, he launched Community Owned Community Operated Nature (COCOON) Conservancies, a rewilding initiative outside India's Protective Area Network which seeks to improve the lives of Indian farmers who live near forest land by rewilding their failed farms back to biodiverse forest status, and helping them find new sources of income, like ecotourism.

Sahgal has served on a number of government and non-government bodies, including the National Board for Wildlife, Animal Welfare Board, State Wildlife Board of Maharashtra, the IUCN (World Conservation Union), The Wild Foundation (U.S.A) and the Expert Appraisal Committee for Infrastructure, Ministry of Environment and Forests, Government of India. He works with policymakers, social workers, economists and scientists at the tri-junction of biodiversity, climate change and economics, speaking at national and international platforms in support of wilderness conservation while continuing to spearhead the work of the Sanctuary Nature Foundation.

== Publications ==
Besides the Sanctuary Asia and Cub magazines, Sahgal has published numerous works in both English and regional languages. He has authored coffee table books on wildlife, including a series on some of India's national parks and sanctuaries; The Bandhavgarh Inheritance, The Sundarbans Inheritance, The Bharatpur Inheritance, The Kaziranga Inheritance, The Corbett Inheritance and The Periyar Inheritance and a stand-alone, India Naturally.

He also produced 30 wildlife documentaries.

== Kids for Tigers ==
Sahgal founded Kids for Tigers in the year 2000. Kids For Tigers is an educational outreach programme targeting rural and urban kids across India through nature walks, fests and workshops. The programme started in urban cities—New Delhi, Mumbai, Calcutta, Bangalore—and then branched out into smaller towns and cities like Chandrapur that border tiger reserves. Kids For Tigers has reached out to over one million children. The tiger, a metaphor for all of nature, is a rallying point for children working to safeguard their own future. The goal is "to give city kids the opportunity to fall in love with tigers and with nature, and to teach them that we can’t save tigers without saving their home".
