= Bihari Lal Bishnoi =

Indian politician

Biharilal Bishnoi

Member of the Rajasthan Legislative Assembly
- In office 2018–2023
- Preceded by: Rameshwar Dudi
- Succeeded by: Sushila Dudi
- Constituency: Nokha

Personal details
- Born: 25 August 1979 (age 47) Jasrasar, Rajasthan, India
- Party: Bhartiya Janta Party
- Spouse: Alka Bishnoi (m. 2006)
- Education: Maharaja Ganga Singh University
- Occupation: Agriculture, Advocate (B.Sc., LLB)

Biharilal Bishnoi (born 25 August 1979) is former member of the Rajasthan Legislative Assembly from Nokha. He is a member of Bharatiya Janata Party. In 2023 Rajasthan Legislative Assembly elections, he lost to Sushila Dudi.

== Political life ==
Biharilal won the election from Nokha for the first time in 2018. Even before that, he faced defeat twice in 2008 and 2013.
