= Sanctuary Nature Foundation =

Indian nonprofit organization

Sanctuary Nature Foundation is an Indian nonprofit foundation that was founded in 2015 building on the work of Sanctuary Asia, a wildlife magazine that was launched in 1981 by Bittu Sahgal. Its network of conservationists, naturalists, scientists, writers and photographers run various projects in environmental policy, advocacy, science, on-ground support, wildlife habitat management and more. The foundation also holds annual awards to honour grassroots conservationists and wildlife photographers.

== History ==
=== 1980s ===
Inspired by Fateh Singh Rathore, who urged him to educate the Indian citizen on the importance of wildlife conservation, Bittu Sahgal founded the magazine Sanctuary Asia in October 1981. Its first edition was published the same month. In 1984, a second magazine was launched to reach a younger audience, Sanctuary Cub.

At the same time, Sanctuary Films was established, and two wildlife conservation serials in Hindi, named ‘Project Tiger’ and 'Rakshak', aired on Doordarshan, India's national television network.

=== 1990s ===
In the early 1990s, the Sanctuary team began expanding their work beyond the publication to conservation projects, advocacy, research, habitat management and more.

The organisation began to reach out to larger numbers through the syndication of feature articles by diverse authors such as Ruskin Bond, Vijaya Venkat, Dilip D’Souza and more in the mainstream press. Under the banner of Sanctuary Features, the organisation put forward alternate views on nature, wildlife, conservation and development issues while also covering related subjects like travel, science and health.

Sanctuary Photo Library, the stock photo agency, was created in 1990 as a repository of natural history images. It has a fully computerised database of wildlife and landscape photographs.

=== 2000s ===
In 1999, Sanctuary launched Kids for Tigers, an environmental education programme that was introduced in schools across India. Kids for Tigers was developed to increase awareness amongst children about biodiversity and the urgent need to save tigers and forests in order to secure our own future.

In the year 2000, the Sanctuary Wildlife Awards were instituted to honour men and women working to protect our wilderness areas and photographers who used their skills as a conservation tool.

It was in 2015 that Sanctuary Asia established Sanctuary Nature Foundation, the nonprofit foundation that now publishes the magazines and several other publications and also manages various conservation projects.

== Publications ==
=== Magazines ===
Sanctuary Asia, edited by Bittu Sahgal, aims to educate the adult public about the importance of protecting the environment, covers relevant news on wildlife and conservation. Its first edition was published in October 1981. In 1984, the foundation began publishing a second magazine, Sanctuary Cub. It is currently edited by Tara Sahgal. In 2017, the Cub magazine bagged the Runner Up position in the Kids Stop Press Award for the best newspaper/magazine for children.

Aside from the magazines, Sanctuary Nature Foundation publishes a variety of reading material today, including coffee table books, wildlife guides and national park guides.

=== Coffee table books ===
Sanctuary's coffee table books are published in two series and three standalone:

- The Inheritance series is a tribute to select sanctuaries in India, displaying images and articles by conservationists, photographers and writers. The series contains books based on the following sanctuaries: Kaziranga, Periyar, Corbett, Tadoba, Bandhavgarh and Bharatpur.
- The Wild series was birthed from a belief in the importance of documenting information on each Indian state's unique ecology. There are three books in this series, based on the states of Maharashtra, Chhattisgarh and Madhya Pradesh.
- The standalone coffee table books published by the foundation are India Naturally, Forever Stripes and Bor Tiger Reserve.

=== Park guidebooks ===
Currently, Sanctuary has published guides to 9 Indian parks and sanctuaries.

=== The Ecologist Asia ===
Sanctuary also published The Ecologist Asia, an Indian edition of the UK journal The Ecologist, founded by Edward Goldsmith. The Ecologist Asia, whose co-editors were Bittu Sahgal, Vandana Shiva, Claude Alvares and Smitu Kothari, was dedicated to disseminating environmental and developmental news relevant to the region.

== Projects ==
Sanctuary's team is currently working on the following projects.

=== Kids for Tigers ===
Kids for Tigers, founded in 2000, is an educational outreach programme that seeks to instill in children a love and respect for nature through trails, workshops, fests and camps. Going way beyond conservation education, the programme is dedicated to ‘leaving kids with a better planet and leaving the planet with better kids’. Kids for Tigers, founded in the year 2000, has reached over a million children and was certified by the Limca Book of Records for having created the world's largest ‘Save The Tiger’ scroll.

=== Mud on Boots ===
Launched in 2017, Mud on Boots seeks to empower grassroots conservationists in India. These conservationists often come from humble backgrounds, and find themselves limited in their ability to expand and fund their work because of the challenges posed by language barriers, geographical remoteness and restricted access to technology and education. These individuals are identified for Sanctuary by credible conservation leaders.

Over a two-year period, the selected Project Leaders receive a monetary grant and other strategic support from Sanctuary.

=== COCOON Conservancies ===
Launched in 2017, Community Owned Community Operated Nature (COCOON) Conservancies are rewilding initiatives outside India's Protective Area Network. COCOON seeks to improve the lives of Indian farmers who live near forest land by rewilding their failed farms back to biodiverse forest status, and helping them find new sources of income, like ecotourism. COCOON's strategy is based on the idea that local communities must be the primary beneficiaries of biodiversity renewal, rather than being displaced, so that relationships between people and parks can improve. COCOON turns land owned by these communities into eco lodges and wildlife viewing spots. The money from the tourism goes to the farmers who still own the land. Additionally, their families are also provided education and medical care.
