= Badopal, Haryana =

Badopal
- Village
- Location in Haryana, India Badopal (India)
- Coordinates: 29.4168034°N 75.4078504°E
- Country: India
- State: Haryana
- District: Fatehabad district

Population (2011)
  - Total: 8,833

Languages
  - Official: Hindi, Haryanvi, Bagri
- Time zone: UTC+5:30 (IST)
- PIN: 125048

Badopal is a large village in Fatehabad tehsil of Fatehabad district of Haryana state in North India. Located on NH9, it is 14 km (8.7 mi) from Fatehabad, 13 km (8.1 mi) from Agroha, 36 km (22 mi) from Hisar, 200 km (120 mi) from national capital New Delhi and 207 km (129 mi) from state capital Chandigarh.

== Demographics ==
According to 2011 Census of India, it has population of 8833, including 4635 males and 4198 females, with 68.37% literacy rate compared to Haryana state average of 75.55%, and 16.43% Schedule Caste (SC) and no Scheduled Tribes (ST).

== Wildlife ==
Badopal has nearly 500 deer, blackbucks, bluebucks (nilgai in Hindi), and other wild animals who are protected and cared for by the resident Bishnoi people of the Badopal village.

When Gorakhpur Nuclear Power Plant, 10 km (6.2 mi) away, tried to build a township near Badopal on 185 acres of land and put barbed wire fencing around the site, it caused the death of several endangered wild animals after they got entangled in the fence. Eventually after the intervention of wildlife activists, Bishnoi community and the courts, the plan for township near Badopal was abandoned and site of building township relocated to Agroha and the site for building township near Badopal became available for the sustainment of wildlife.

Bishnoi community have created a group to look after the wildlife in this area. They got the barbed wire banned in the area, regularly deweed the site for allowing fodder for wildlife to grow, got rid off the threat of human poachers and stray dogs who attack and kill the wildlife, and have applied to National Green Tribunal Act to have the site declared a protected wildlife area. Consequently, due to the protection measures by the community, the number of deer and other wildlife has increased in the area.

== Issues ==
Soil salinity, due to water logging, is making the farm land infertile causing economic difficulties for the farmers of the area.

== See also ==
- Agroha Mound, ancient archaeological site nearby
- Forests Department, Haryana
- Rakhigarhi, ancient archaeological site nearby
- List of Monuments of National Importance in Haryana
- Wildlife sanctuaries and national parks of Haryana
- List of State Protected Monuments in Haryana
