= Machia Biological Park =

Zoo in Rajasthan, India

Coordinates: 26°18′15″N 72°58′46″E

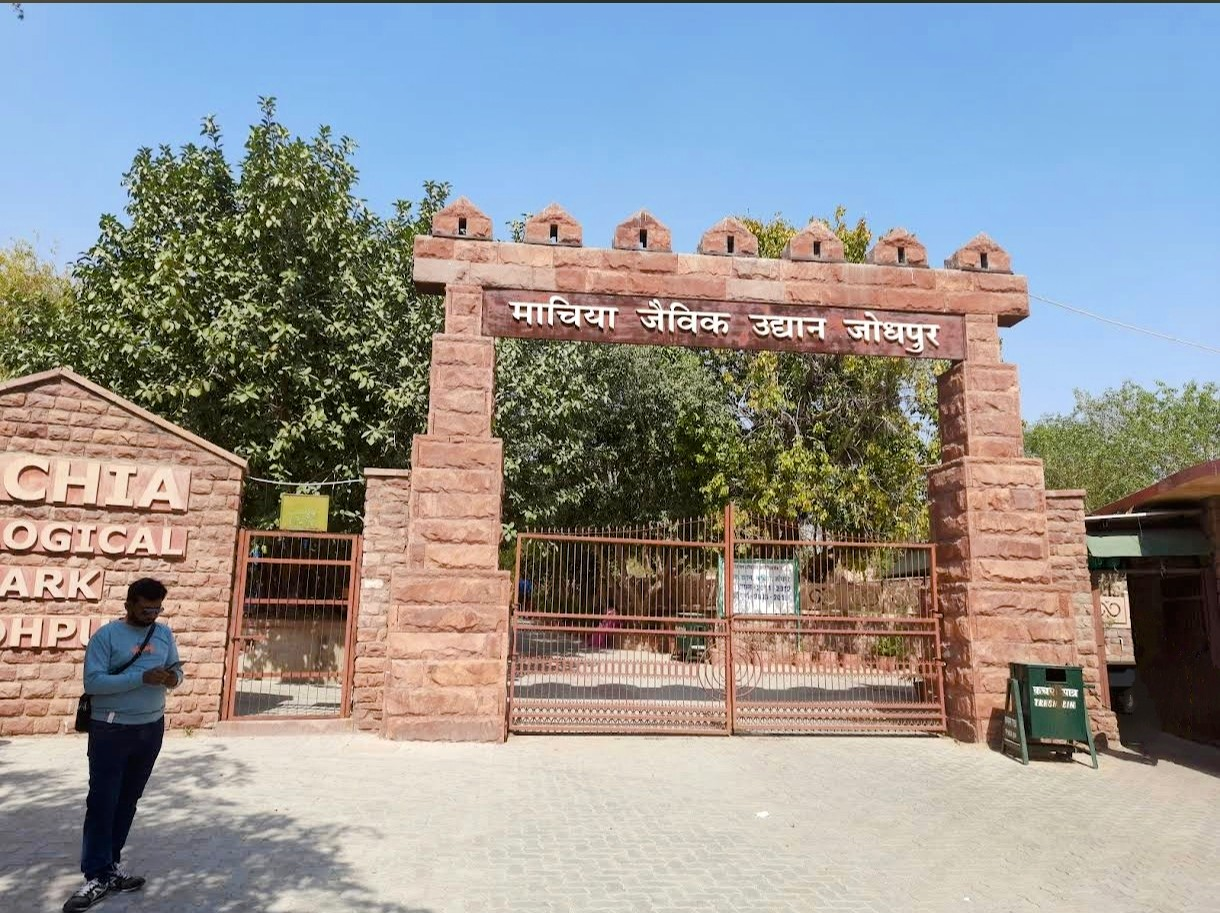
- Machia Biological Park
- Interactive map of Machia Biological Park
- Date opened: 12 April 2016
- Location: Jodhpur, Rajasthan, India
- Land area: 41 hectares

Machia Biological Park (also known as Machia Safari Park) is a zoological garden and wildlife conservation facility located near Kaylana Lake, approximately 7–8 km west of Jodhpur in Rajasthan, India. Established on 41 hectares of protected forest land, the park opened to the public on 20 January 2016. It was developed as a modern satellite zoo to replace the older heritage zoo in Umaid Garden, which had become obsolete and had lost recognition from the Central Zoo Authority. Construction cost approximately ₹32.4 crore and took around six years to complete. The park is managed by the Rajasthan Forest Department as part of its wildlife conservation and public education mandate.

== History and establishment ==
The idea of creating a zoological park near Jodhpur was first proposed in 1982–83, when a portion of the Machia Forest Block was earmarked for development. In 1990, 604 hectares of this forest area were declared protected under the Rajasthan Forest Act to facilitate the development of a biological park. The need for a modern zoo arose due to outdated enclosures at the previous city zoo and the withdrawal of recognition by national authorities. After a prolonged period of planning and construction, the park was inaugurated by Chief Minister Vasundhara Raje on 20 January 2016.

== Flora and fauna ==
Machia Park represents the dry thorn-scrub ecosystem of western Rajasthan. Native vegetation includes species such as Acacia senegal, Prosopis cineraria (khejri), Prosopis juliflora, Capparis decidua, Ziziphus nummularia, and Commiphora wightii. In areas with shallow or rocky soil, staff have planted native species like neem, peepal, gular, and banyan using rock-blasting techniques to aid root penetration.

The park contains about 20 enclosures with native animal species including:

- Large carnivores: Asiatic lion (Panthera leo persica), Bengal tiger (Panthera tigris tigris), Indian leopard (Panthera pardus fusca)
- Herbivores: Chital (Axis axis), Indian gazelle or chinkara (Gazella bennettii), blackbuck (Antilope cervicapra)
- Reptiles: mugger crocodile (Crocodylus palustris), gharial (Gavialis gangeticus), monitor lizard (Varanus bengalensis) and spiny-tailed lizard (Uromastyx hardwickii)
- Other mammals: striped hyena (Hyaena hyaena), Indian wolf (Canis lupus pallipes), golden jackal (Canis aureus), Indian fox (Vulpes bengalensis), desert fox (Vulpes vulpes pusilla), jungle cat (Felis chaus), desert cat (Felis lybica), sloth bear (Melursus ursinus), Indian porcupine (Hystrix indica), and Indian hedgehog (Paraechinus micropus)

The park is notable for housing endangered species such as the Asiatic lion, which survives in the wild only in Gir, Gujarat.

== Visitor information ==
The park is open daily except Tuesdays and major public holidays such as Republic Day and Independence Day.

- Winter timings (October–March): 08:30 – 17:00
- Summer timings (March–October): 08:00 – 18:00

Entrance fees are:

- ₹30 for Indian adults
- ₹300 for foreign visitors
- ₹15 for school students (with valid ID)
- Free for children under five

Camera charges range from ₹80–₹200 depending on equipment.

Visitor amenities include a cafeteria, shaded resting pavilions with toilets, and drinking water facilities. Paths are largely paved, making the park moderately accessible to wheelchairs and strollers. Parking near the entrance accommodates about 150 two-wheelers, 25 cars, and a few buses. Wayfinding signage and a site map are provided at the entrance. The park is approximately 8 km from Jodhpur Junction railway station, and is accessible via local transport along Kaylana Road.

== Conservation and education ==
Machia Biological Park is designed to support ex situ conservation and environmental education. Facilities include:

- A Nature Interpretation Centre focused on local ecosystems
- Informational signage at each enclosure
- An "Adopt-an-Animal" programme for public sponsorship

A dedicated veterinary hospital and post-mortem lab are located within the park to provide health care and facilitate breeding. In 2016, an Asiatic lioness brought from Junagarh Zoo gave birth to three cubs at Machia, all of which were hand-reared under veterinary supervision.

The park conducts school outreach programs, wildlife awareness events, and guided tours. Occasional demonstrations and talks are held in collaboration with NGOs and the forest department on dates such as World Environment Day.
