= Vishwanath Meghwal =

Indian politician

Member of the Rajasthan Legislative Assembly
- Incumbent
- Assumed office 03 December 2023
- Preceded by: Govind Ram Meghwal
- In office 2008–2018
- Succeeded by: Govind Ram Meghwal
- Constituency: Khajuwala

Parliamentary Secretary, Government of Rajasthan
- In office 2008–2018

Personal details
- Born: Ratangarh; Churu district, Rajasthan
- Party: Bharatiya Janata Party
- Spouse: Dr. Vimla Devi
- Children: 2 Son's
- Education: B.S.c. M.B.B.S.
- Alma mater: Maharshi Dayanand Saraswati University; University of Rajasthan
- Occupation: Politician
- Profession: Doctor

Vishwanath Meghwal is an Indian politician. He was elected to the 13th, 14th & 16th Rajasthan Legislative Assembly representing the Khajuwala constituency. He also served as the Parliamentary Secretary in Government of Rajasthan. He is Member of the Bharatiya Janata Party.

== Political career ==
Following the 2023 Rajasthan Legislative Assembly election, he was elected as an MLA from the Khajuwala Assembly constituency. He defeated the Indian National Congress candidate, Govind Ram Meghwal, with 91,276 votes.
