= 1998 blackbuck poaching case =

Indian legal case involving Salman Khan

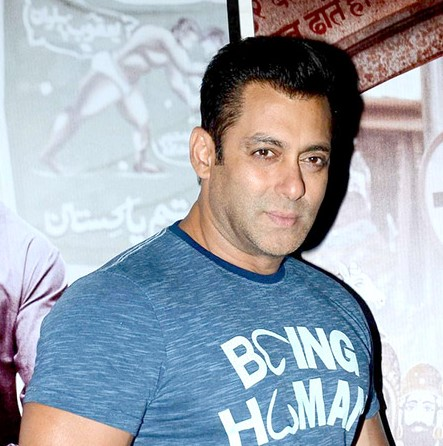
Salman Khan, main accused in 1998 blackbuck poaching case

The 1998 Blackbuck poaching case is a high-profile legal matter involving Bollywood actor Salman Khan, accused of hunting two blackbucks in Kankani village near Jodhpur, Rajasthan, in September 1998. Bishnoi community filed a complaint against Khan and his co-actors, Saif Ali Khan, Sonali Bendre, Neelam, and Tabu, accused of hunting two blackbucks during the shooting of the film Hum Saath Saath Hain.

== Background ==
The blackbuck, also known as the Indian antelope or Chinkara, is an endangered species protected under the Wild Life (Protection) Act, 1972. The Bishnoi community, a religious sect found in parts of Rajasthan, Haryana, and Punjab, reveres the blackbuck and has a long-standing tradition of protecting wildlife.

== Incident ==
In September 1998, while filming of Hum Saath-Saath Hain in Rajasthan, Salman Khan and his co-stars Saif Ali Khan, Sonali Bendre, Neelam, and Tabu were accused of hunting two blackbucks in Kankani village near Jodhpur. Members of the Bishnoi community filed a complaint against these actors, leading to their arrest. Salman Khan was charged under Section 51 of the Wild Life (Protection) Act, 1972, while the other actors faced charges of unlawful assembly under the Indian Penal Code.

== Legal proceedings ==
In September 1998, during the filming of the Bollywood movie Hum Saath Saath Hain in Rajasthan, actors Salman Khan, Saif Ali Khan, Sonali Bendre, Neelam, and Tabu were accused of poaching two blackbucks in Kankani village, near Jodhpur. The incident occurred while the actors were on location for the film. Following the alleged hunting of the protected species, members of the Bishnoi community, who regard the blackbuck as sacred, filed a complaint on 2 October 1998.

On 12 October 1998, Khan was arrested in connection with the alleged hunting of two blackbucks, an endangered species. Following his arrest, Khan was granted bail.

In April 2006, a trial court found Khan guilty under the Wildlife (Protection) Act, 1972, for the illegal hunting of two blackbucks, in Rajasthan. The court sentenced Khan to five years of imprisonment and imposed a fine of ₹25,000. However, Salman Khan appealed the verdict, and in subsequent years, the case underwent various legal challenges and developments.

In August 2007, Khan appealed to the Jodhpur court against his conviction in the blackbuck poaching case. However, the court rejected the appeal and upheld the five-year imprisonment sentence. Shortly thereafter, the Rajasthan High Court intervened and suspended the five-year sentence, allowing Khan to remain out of prison pending further legal proceedings. However, as part of the conditions for his release, the court ordered that Khan obtain formal permission from the court before undertaking any foreign travel.

In 2012, a bench of the Rajasthan High Court framed charges against all the accused in the blackbuck poaching case, including Khan. Khan was charged under Section 9/51 of the Wildlife (Protection) Act, 1972, for the illegal hunting of the endangered species. However, in November 2013, Justice Nirmal Jeet Kaur of the Rajasthan High Court stayed the five-year imprisonment sentence that had been imposed on Khan by the lower court in 2006. This stay was granted to allow Khan to apply for a UK visa for a film shoot.

In January 2015, the Supreme Court of India revoked the stay order issued by the Rajasthan High Court on Salman Khan's five-year imprisonment sentence, which had been imposed by a lower court in 2006. The Supreme Court ruled that a person's conviction should not be stayed simply because they were seeking an international visa.

On 25 July 2016, the Rajasthan High Court acquitted actor Salman Khan in the 1998 black buck poaching case, citing insufficient evidence to prove that the deceased blackbucks were killed by a firearm owned or used by Khan. Following this decision, the Rajasthan government appealed the acquittal in the Supreme Court in October 2016. Subsequently, the Supreme Court agreed to fast-track the trial, with proceedings set to move forward in November 2016.

On 5 April 2018, a Jodhpur court sentenced Khan to five years in prison and imposed a penalty of ₹10,000 in connection with the 1998 blackbuck poaching case. However, the other four accused, Saif Ali Khan, Sonali Bendre, Tabu, and Neelam Kothari, were acquitted. Following the verdict, Khan was granted bail on 7 April 2018 by the Jodhpur Sessions Court, under the bench of Justice Joshi.

In March 2022, the Rajasthan High Court granted permission to transfer two petitions related to the blackbuck poaching case from the Jodhpur District and Sessions Court to the High Court. This transfer was made to ensure that all matters concerning Khan in the case would be heard and adjudicated at the Rajasthan High Court.
