= Pipasar =

Village in Rajasthan, India

Pipasar पीपासर Pimpasar
- Village
- Location in Rajasthan
- Coordinates: 27°32′26″N 73°40′18″E
- State: Rajasthan
- District: Nagaur District
- PIN: 341029

Pipasar is a village in the Nagaur district of Rajasthan, India.

== Historical Significance ==
Guru Jambheswar Ji, also known as Jambhoji, was born to a Parmar (clan) in Pipasar village of Nagaur district of Rajasthan in the year 1451, Vikrami Samvat 1508, on Krishna (black) 8th day of Bhadarpad month (same day of Krishna's birth).
