= Bhamatsar =

- Village
- Location in Rajasthan, India Bhamatsar (India)
- Coordinates: 27.6678°N 73.3620°E
- Country: India
- State: Rajasthan
- District: Bikaner
- Tehsil: Nokha

Government
  - Type: Panchayati raj (India)
  - Body: Gram panchayat
- Elevation: 217 m (712 ft)

Population (2011)
  - Total: 5,000

Languages
  - Official: Marwari, Hindi
- Time zone: UTC+5:30 (IST)
- PIN: 334801
- Telephone code: 01532
- Vehicle registration: RJ-07, RJ-50
- Nearest city: Bikaner
- Temperature: Summer: 41 °C (106 °F); Winter: −7 °C (19 °F)

Bhamatsar is a large village located in Nokha Tehsil of Bikaner District of Rajasthan state, India.

It is located 340 kilometres (211 mi) from Jaipur, 209 kilometres (130 mi) from Jodhpur, and 467 kilometres (290 mi) from Mount Abu.

The village is administrated by a sarpanch (head of the village) who is elected every five years. In 2011 the population of the village was 5,000, with 614 households.

== Geography ==
The total geographic area of Bhamatsar in 2011 was 3001 hectares. The village lies in the Nokha assembly constituency and the Bikaner parliamentary constituency. The location (village) code of Bhamatsar is 69610.

== Demographics ==
The 2011 Census of India recorded the population of Bhamatsar as 5000, of which 2613 were male and 2387 were female. A total of 614 families resided in the village, with 934 children between the ages of 0 and 6.

In 2011, the literacy rate in Bhamatsar village was 66.21% compared to the 66.11% in the state. Male literacy was 79.32% while female literacy rate was 51.95%.

Scheduled castes made up 14.54% of the population, while 0.02% of the population was made up of Scheduled tribes.

Of the 2498 people in work, 38.99% of workers described their work as "Main Work" (employed more than 6 months), with 690 owner or co-owner cultivators and 31 agricultural workers. The remaining 61.01% of workers were involved in work for less than 6 months.
