= Desert cat =

Desert cat may refer to

- African wildcat, sometimes referred to as 'desert cat'
- Arabian Mau, formerly known as the 'Desert cat'
- Asiatic wildcat, sometimes referred to as 'desert cat'
- Sand cat, also sometimes referred to as 'desert cat'
