= Sushila Dudi =

Indian politician

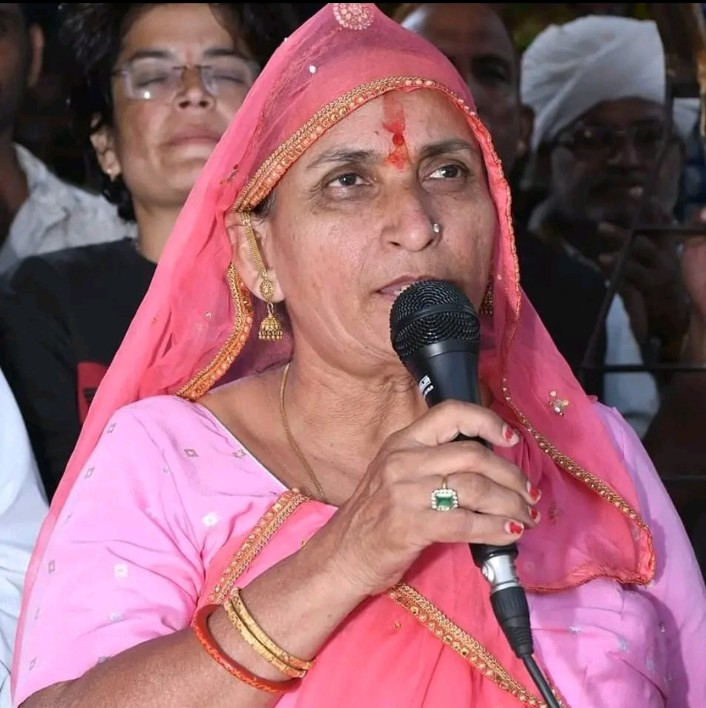

Member of the Rajasthan Legislative Assembly
- Incumbent
- Assumed office 3 December 2023
- Constituency: Nokha

Personal details
- Born: 1966 (age 59–60) Bikaner, Rajasthan, India
- Party: Indian National Congress
- Spouse: Rameshwar Lal Dudi
- Profession: Politician

Sushila Rameshwar Dudi (born 1966) is an Indian politician from Rajasthan. She was elected to the 16th Rajasthan Legislative Assembly from Nokha, Rajasthan Assembly constituency in Bikaner district. She is a member of the Indian National Congress. She is wife of Rameshwar Lal Dudi, former Leader of Opposition in the Rajasthan Assembly.

== Early life and education ==
Dudi hails from Nokha town in Bikaner district of Rajasthan. Her husband Rameshwar Dudi, is a former Leader of Opposition (LoP) in the Rajasthan Assembly. She passed Class 12 and later joined the BSc course at a college affiliated with University of Ajmer, but discontinued her studies after the second year. She runs the family business in petroleum products.

== Career ==
Sushila was nominated by the Indian National Congress to contest the 2023 assembly election following her husband Rameshwar Lal Dudi's hospitalisation due to brain haemorrhage. Despite being a first-timer, she won as an MLA from the Nokha seat which was formerly held by her ailing husband even though Congress did not fare well in the election. She was elected in the 2023 Rajasthan Legislative Assembly election representing the Indian National Congress. She polled 83,215 votes and defeated her nearest rival and sitting MLA, Bihari Lal Bishnoi of the Bharatiya Janata Party, by a margin of 8,149 votes.
