= Nokha, Rajasthan Assembly constituency =

Assembly constituency in Rajasthan, India

Coordinates: 27.56°N 73.47°E

Nokha
- Constituency No. 18 for the Rajasthan Legislative Assembly

Constituency details
- Country: India
- Region: North India
- State: Rajasthan
- District: Bikaner district
- Established: 1951
- Total electors: 242958
- Reservation: None

Member of Legislative Assembly
- 16th Rajasthan Legislative Assembly
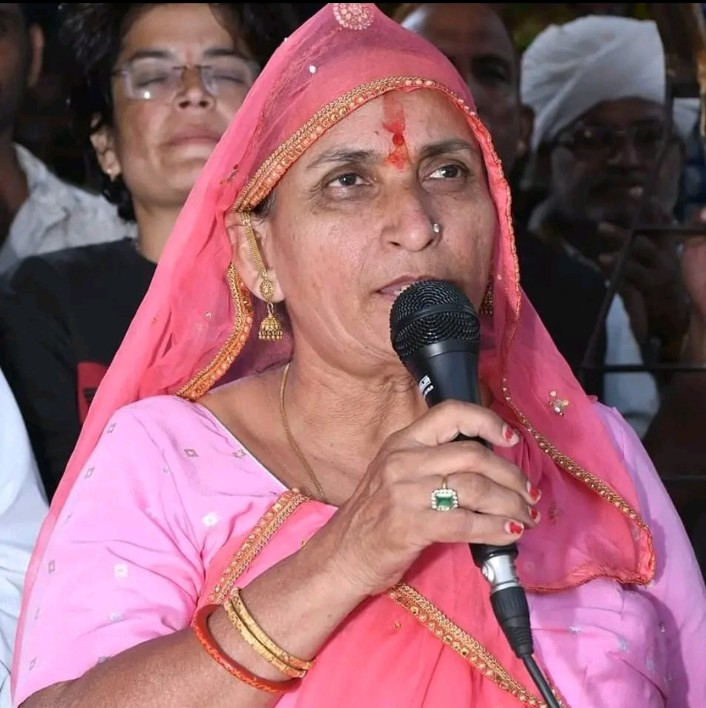
- Incumbent Sushila Dudi
- Party: Indian National Congress
- Elected year: 2023

Nokha Assembly constituency is one of the constituencies of the Rajasthan Legislative Assembly in India. Sushila Rameshwar Dudi is serving as MLA of Nokha.

Nokha constituency covers all voters from Nokha tehsil excluding ILRC Kuchor Aathooni.

== Members of Legislative Assembly ==
Year	Name	Party
1951	Kan Singh	Independent
1957	Rooparam	Independent
1962	Rooparam	Independent
1967	Chunni Lal Indalia	Independent
1972	Chunni Lal Indalia	Indian National Congress
1977	Uda Ram Hatila	Janata Party
1980	Suraja Ram	Indian National Congress
1985	Chunni Lal Indalia	Lok Dal
1990	Chunni Lal Indalia	Janata Dal
1993	Rewat Ram Panwar	Bharatiya Janata Party
1998	Rewat Ram Panwar	Indian National Congress
2003	Govind Ram Meghwal	Bharatiya Janata Party
2008	Kanhaiya Lal Jhanwar	Independent
2013	Rameshwar Lal Dudi	Indian National Congress
2018	Bihari Lal Bishnoi	Bharatiya Janata Party
2023	Sushila Rameshwar Dudi	Indian National Congress

== Election results ==
=== 2023 ===
2023 Rajasthan Legislative Assembly election: Nokha
Party	Candidate	Votes	%	±%
INC	Shushila Rameshwar Dudi	83,215	38.87	−1.92
BJP	Bihari Lal	75,066	35.06	−10.24
Vikas Manch	Kanhaiyalal Jhanwar	33,781	15.78	
Independent	Magna Ram	10,333	4.83	
NOTA	None of the above	1,753	0.82	−0.84
Majority		8,149	3.81	−0.7
Turnout		214,108	75.78	−2.08
INC gain from BJP		Swing		

=== 2018 ===
2018 Rajasthan Legislative Assembly election: Nokha
Party	Candidate	Votes	%	±%
BJP	Biharilal Bishnoi	86,917	45.3	
INC	Rameshwar Dudi	78,254	40.79	
Independent	Manganaram	8,305	4.33	
Independent	Meghsingh	5,969	3.11	
RLP	Indu Devi	4,546	2.37	
NOTA	None of the above	3,188	1.66	
Majority		8,663	4.51	
Turnout		191,868	77.86	

== See also ==
- Member of the Legislative Assembly (India)
