= Ranaram Bishnoi =

Indian Environmentalist

- Born: Ekalkhori, Osian, Jodhpur, Rajasthan
- Occupation: Agriculture
- Years active: 1965
- Known for: Tree-man of Desert
- Notable work: Planted 27,000 Trees in Thar Desert

Ranaram Bishnoi is an environmentalist of Ekalkhori village near Jodhpur, Rajasthan, India. He initiated planting trees in the desert and dry area near his village. He planted over 27,000 trees in 25 bigha land with a large earthen pitcher single-handedly. He is known as ahhu "tree-man" by the people of the area.

He believes that non-human species have equal or rather more rights to live on earth than humans. He said that "the plants and the animals were on the planet much before we landed here. They have more rights on the planet than us and if we cannot give that to them at least we can ensure we don’t destroy them in our greed.”

His co-worker is Khamu Ram Bishnoi, Tree Man also known as Turban man. Planting these trees he stopped the desert from expanding over his village potentially ruining hundreds of crops.
