= Rameshwar Lal Dudi =

Indian politician (1963–2025)

Leader of the Opposition (LoP) Rajasthan Legislative Assembly
- In office 23 January 2014 – 12 December 2018
- Preceded by: Vasundhara Raje
- Succeeded by: Gulab Chand Kataria

Member of Parliament, Lok Sabha
- In office 1999–2004
- Succeeded by: Dharmendra
- Constituency: Bikaner

Personal details
- Born: 1 July 1963 Nokha, Rajasthan, India
- Died: 4 October 2025 (aged 62) Nokha, Rajasthan, India
- Party: Indian National Congress
- Spouse: Sushila Dudi

Rameshwar Lal Dudi (1 July 1963 – 4 October 2025) was an Indian politician and a peasant leader. A veteran leader of the Indian National Congress (INC), Dudi served as the Leader of the Opposition (LoP) in the Rajasthan Assembly from 2014 to 2018. He was elected to the Rajasthan Legislative Assembly in 2013. Previously, Dudi also served as Member of Parliament in the Lok Sabha from 1999 to 2004. In 2004 Indian general election, Dharmendra Deol won election from Bikaner against Dudi.

Born in Nokha of Bikaner district of Rajasthan. He did Bachelor of Commerce from the Maharshi Dayanand Saraswati University. He started his political career with National Student Union of India (NSUI). Dudi was known for his involvement in rural and agricultural issues and played a prominent role in local governance, including Panchayati Raj institutions and state politics. He also served as chairman of Rajasthan State Agro-Industries Development Board.

== Early life and education ==
Dudi was born on 1 July 1963 in Nokha of Bikaner district in the Indian state of Rajasthan. He belonged to the Hindu Jat family. His father was Jetha Ram Dudi, and mother was Asha Devi. He did Bachelor of Commerce from Maharshi Dayanand Saraswati University. Dudi started his political career with the National Student Union of India (NSUI), and later won the 1999 Indian general election from Bikaner.

== Political career ==
Dudi began his political career during his student years through the National Students’ Union of India (NSUI), the student wing of the Indian National Congress. Following his education, Dudi entered local governance. In 1995, he was elected Pradhan of the Nokha Panchayat Samiti, a local government position within the Panchayati Raj system. In this role, he was responsible for overseeing development programs and welfare initiatives in the Nokha block, focusing on rural infrastructure, irrigation, and agricultural concerns.

In 1999, Dudi was elected to the 13th Lok Sabha representing the Bikaner constituency. During his parliamentary term, he served on the Committee on Food, Civil Supplies, and Public Distribution, contributing to discussions and oversight related to food security, rural welfare, and agricultural policies. After completing his term in Parliament, Dudi continued his political activity at the district level. He served as Zila Pramukh (District Chief) of Bikaner, overseeing district-level administration from 2005 to 2010.

In 2013, Dudi was elected as a Member of the Rajasthan Legislative Assembly (MLA) from the Nokha constituency. Following this, in 2014, he was appointed Leader of the Opposition in the Rajasthan Assembly, a position he held until 2018. Throughout his political career, Dudi was associated primarily with rural and agricultural issues. His career from student politics to Panchayati Raj leadership, parliamentary representation, and legislative opposition reflects his engagement in both grass-root governance and state-level politics.

== Public image ==
Dudi was often referred to as a “pant-shirt, Jat-chief,” a phrase used to highlight his personal style and simplicity. Amar Ujala wrote that, Dudi was regarded as a leader who consistently raised farmers’ issues, maintained a reputation for integrity, and was known for an approachable personality.

News 18 wrote that, Dudi was known for his assertive political style and his firm stance on farmers’ issues. This approach earned him the popular nickname “Dudi Bhaiya”. The Hindu stated that, Dudi was a bold and assertive farmer leader, noted for taking strong decisions on agrarian concerns and for confronting authorities in support of peasants’ rights.

== Personal life and death ==
Dudi married Sushila on 7 July 1983. The couple had 3 children. Sushila Dudi is a member of the Rajasthan Legislative Assembly from the Nokha constituency of Bikaner.

On 27 August 2023, Dudi suffered a brain haemorrhage in Jaipur and underwent surgery at SMS Hospital, before being shifted to Medanta Hospital, Gurugram for advanced care. Dudi was a cardiac patient with hypertension and diabetes. Dudi remained in a coma for nearly two years. On 4 October 2025, Dudi died at his residence in Bikaner at the age of 62.

Following his death, condolences were expressed by leaders from different political parties. Congress president Mallikarjun Kharge and senior leader Rahul Gandhi described his passing as a significant loss to the party. Former chief minister Ashok Gehlot, Congress state president Govind Singh Dotasara, and opposition leader Tikka Ram Jully, also paid tribute, recalling his role in representing farmers and rural communities. Rajasthan chief minister Bhajanlal Sharma expressed grief on behalf of the state government. RLP leader Hanuman Beniwal also paid tribute.

== Positions held ==
Year	Position
1995–1999	Pradhan, Panchayat Samiti, Nokha, Bikaner, Rajasthan
1999–2004	Member, 13th Lok Sabha
1999–2000	Member, Committee on Food, Civil Supplies and Public Distribution, Lok Sabha
2005–2010	District chief, Zila Parishad, Bikaner
2014–2018	Leader of the Opposition, Rajasthan Legislative Assembly
2022–2023	Chairman, Rajasthan State Agro Industries Development Board
