= Udasar =

Coordinates: 27.559966°N 73.28928°E

- Village
- State: Rajasthan
- District: Bikaner

Languages

Udasar is a village in Bikaner tehsil in the state of Rajasthan in northern India. It is the original home of the Jajra pandits.
