= Kailash Sankhala =

Indian naturalist (1925–1994)

- Born: 30 January 1925; Jodhpur, Jodhpur State, British India
- Died: 15 August 1994 (aged 69)
- Known for: Environmental activism; Role as first Director of Project Tiger
- Awards: Padma Shri

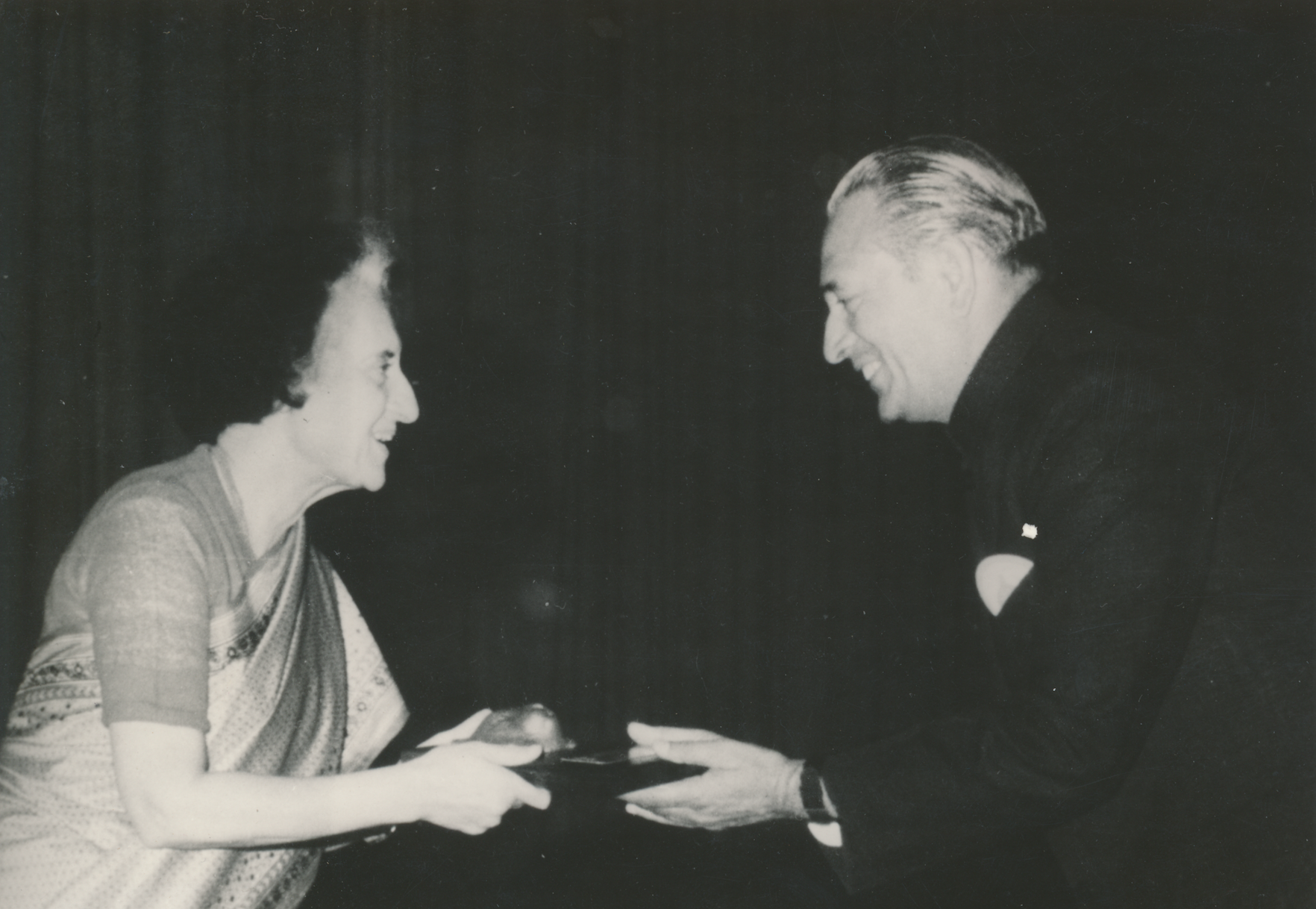
Indira Gandhi presenting award to Kailash Sankhala

Kailash Sankhala (30 January 1925 –20 August 1997) was an Indian biologist and conservationist. He was the director of Delhi Zoological Park and chief wildlife warden of Rajasthan. He is best known for his work in preserving tigers. Sankhala was the first director of Project Tiger, a conservation programme set up in India in 1973. He was well known as "The Tiger Man of India". He was awarded the Padma Shri in 1992 and Rajasthan Ratan in 2013.

== Wildlife manager ==
Sankhala started at the Forest Service in 1953. From 1953 to 1964, he managed wildlife sanctuaries in Sariska, Bharatpur, Banvihar and Ranthambhor, as well as forests in Rajasthan. In 1965, he was appointed director of the Delhi Zoological Park. In 1973 he was appointed head of Project Tiger, an attempt to save the Indian tiger from extinction.

== Tiger conservation ==
In 1971, Sankhala conducted a survey of the tiger population in India. His research later lead him to become the first director of Project Tiger in 1973. Sankhala created the Tiger Trust in 1989. Sankhala's son, Pradeep Sankhala, took over the charge of the Tiger Trust after his father's death. Upon his death in 2003, his son Amit Sankhala stepped in.

== Personal life ==
Kailash Sankhala was born in Jodhpur, Rajasthan on 30 January 1925. Sankhala died on 15 August 1994 in Jaipur. He had a son ..Sankhala's son, Pradeep Sankhala, took over the charge of the Tiger Trust after his father's death. Upon his death in 2003, his son Amit Sankhala stepped in.

== Awards and honours ==
The Ministry of Environment and Forests established the Kailash Sankhala Fellowship award for conservation efforts in his honour.

== Bibliography ==
- Kailash Sankhala (1973). Wild Beauty: A Study of Indian Wildlife. National Book Trust, India; [sole distributors: Thomson Press (India).
- Kailash Sankhala (1974). Tigre. World Wildlife Fund. ISBN 3859880101.
- Kailash Sankhala (1975). Tigerland. Bobbs-Merrill. ISBN 978-0-672-52037-2.
- Kailash Sankhala (1978). Tiger! The Story of the Indian Tiger. William Collins Sons & Co Ltd. ISBN 0-00-216124-9.
- Kailash Sankhala (1990). Gardens of God: The Waterbird Sanctuary at Bharatpur. Vikas Publishing House. ISBN 9780706930412.
- Kailash Sankhala (1993). Return of the Tiger. Lustre Press.
- Kailash Sankhala; Swaraj Chauhan (1997). The Story of Indian Tiger. Grange Books. ISBN 978-1-85627-888-1.

== See also ==
- Project Tiger
- Indira Gandhi
- S
- Karan Singh
- Bengal tiger
