= Shweta Bishnoi =

Indian cricketer

Personal information
- Full name: Shweta Deepak Bishnoi
- Born: 12 August 1992 (age 34); Hanumangarh, Rajasthan, India
- Batting: Right-handed
- Bowling: Right-arm medium-fast

Domestic team information
- Years: Team
- 2007–2018: Rajasthan
- 2010–2011: Madhya Pradesh
- Source: Cricinfo, 20 February 2020

Shweta Deepak Bishnoi (born 12 August 1992 at Hanumangarh, Rajasthan) is a Rajasthani cricketer. She is a right-handed batsman and bowls right-arm medium pace. She played for Rajasthan, Madhya Pradesh and Central zone. She has played 2 First-class, 33 List A and 29 Women's Twenty20 matches. She made her debut in major domestic cricket in a one-day match on 12 October 2007 against Vidarbha.
