= Fateh Singh Rathore =

Tiger Guru

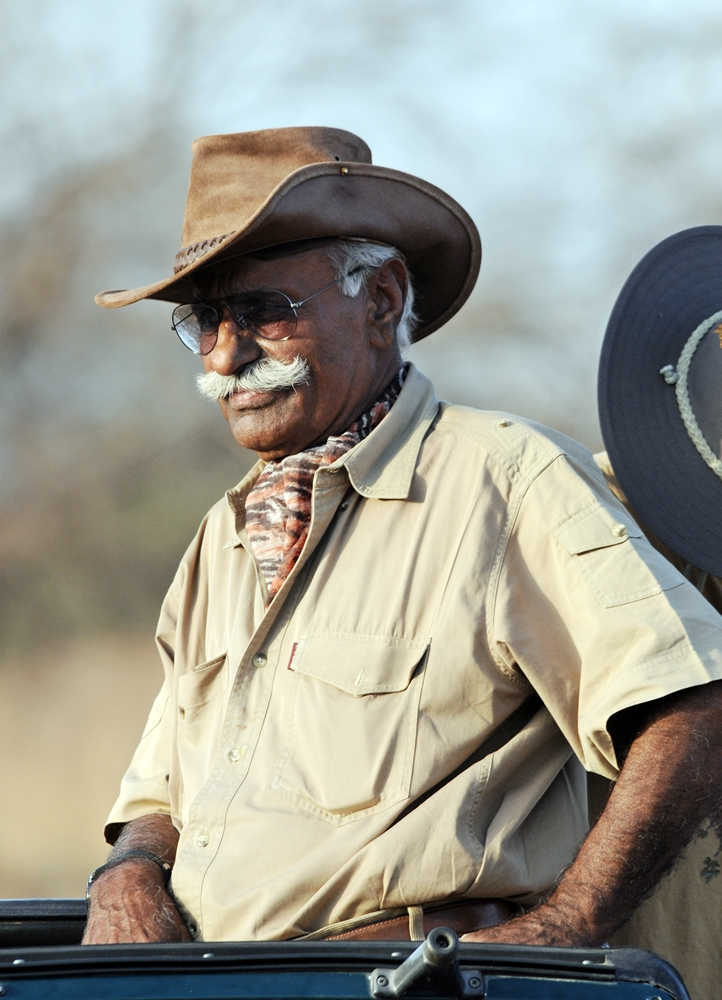
- Fateh Singh Rathore in 2008
- Born: 10 August 1938; Choradia Village, Jodhpur District, Rajasthan, British India
- Died: 1 March 2011 (aged 72); Sawai Madhopur, Rajasthan, India
- Education: Rajputana University 1960, Wildlife Institute of India 1969
- Known for: Tiger conservation
- Spouse: Khem Kanwar
- Awards: World Wildlife Fund lifetime achievement award
- Scientific career
- Fields: Wildlife Conservation
- Workplaces: Rajasthan Forest Dept., Tiger Watch

Fateh Singh Rathore (10 August 1938 – 1 March 2011) was an Indian tiger conservationist. Fateh Singh joined the Indian Forest Service in 1960 and was part of the first Project Tiger team. He was widely acknowledged as the tiger guru for his legendary knowledge of the big cat. He worked over 50 years in wildlife conservation. Rathore was noted for his pioneering relocation of villages from inside the Ranthambhore National Park in 1973–75. Largely because of Mr. Rathore, "Ranthambhore became the place which brought the tiger to the consciousness of people the world over."

== Early life ==
Fateh Singh Rathore was born in Choradia village in Jodhpur district of Rajasthan. He was the eldest son in a family of 6 boys and 5 girls. His grandfather Laxman Singh Rathore was a major in the army. Rathore's father, Sagat Singh, was the eldest son of Laxman Singh. He was a police officer and managed the family's land and property in their village near Jodhpur. His mother died in February 2010.

Rathore's uncles, one in the army, and the other a lawyer, helped bring him up. He was sent away to Col. Brown Cambridge School, a boarding school, in Dehra Dun and later stayed with an uncle while a college student. He was uninterested in his studies, although his uncle wanted him to be a lawyer. Rathore graduated from the Rajputana University in 1960. After working as a store clerk and selling coal, Rathore was offered a job as a park ranger by an uncle who had become deputy minister of forests in Rajasthan.

== Conservation work ==
Rathore joined the Rajasthan Forest Service on the advice of his uncle. One of his first jobs was organising tiger hunts in the area which later became Ranthambhore National Park (RNP) during a visit by the Queen Elizabeth II and the Duke of Edinburgh in January 1961. The first tiger he ever saw was one shot by the Duke: "I was not in love with the tiger at the time. We were very happy that we succeeded," he recalled.

He loved the forest service, and grew very interested in conservation. He was posted as a game warden at Sariska when there were still tigers there. He worked at Mount Abu Game Reserve between 1963 and 1970. Rathore was posted in 1971 as game warden in Ranthambhore. The area of RNP, though degraded, still existed as a forest because it was the game reserve of the royal family of Jaipur. He was sent to the Wildlife Institute of India for training, in the first batch of forest officers to be trained there in 1969. While there he showed a greater aptitude for field work and was not too interested in theory. He fared well there and his guru, S. R. Choudhury, recognised his potential.

=== "Project Tiger" ===
Project Tiger (PT) was started in 1973 at the instance of Indira Gandhi, who was very concerned about the fact that the number of wild tigers was reducing because of hunting. Hunting was banned from then on, and 9 reserves were selected under PT. Ranthambhore was one of them. Rathore was sent there as the Assistant Field Director, but was given a free hand by his senior.

At that time, the area looked very different. There were wheat fields where Padam Talao now stands – there had been an artificially created lake there, which the villagers had drained for their agriculture, and he restored the lake along with Raj Bagh and Malik Talao. 16 villages dotted the whole area, with no roads connecting them with each other. The villagers lived in extreme poverty and deprivation, with no health care or educational facilities. The vegetation had all been eaten by domestic cattle. There were wild animals around, but they emerged mostly at night and were rarely seen.

Rathore went about carving roads through the area, patrolling it regularly, and realised that the villages needed to be moved out if the tigers were to have any chance of flourishing. It required a huge amount of tact and patience to convince people to leave their homes, and Rathore frequently found himself crying along with the villagers. He managed to convince a young schoolteacher about the benefits of moving to another location, making him his wife's rakhi brother. The villagers were given a good compensation package, and finally moved to a newly established village called Kailashpuri which had a health centre and a school, and better agricultural land outside the park.

Once the villages were moved out, (1973–75), the park's vegetation started regenerating on its own. Soon Rathore began to see the pugmarks of tigers, but they were still nocturnal. A lame buffalo had been left behind by the villagers, and when he saw the pugmarks of a tigress and cubs in that area, he knew that she would kill the animal sooner or later. One day he found that the buffalo had been killed, so he climbed a tree and waited there. The tigress soon appeared with her cubs and started feeding. She was aware of Rathore up in the tree and snarled at him a couple of times. He was so excited that his hands shook as he took photos. Later, he had many opportunities to study this tigress whom he named Padmini after his elder daughter, and she tolerated his presence benignly.

In August 1981 Rathore was nearly killed by a group of villagers who resented being sent away from the park area because they used to collect fees from others for allowing their cattle to graze there. He was beaten up and left for dead with several fractures and a head injury, and it took several months for him to recover. Later he was given a bravery award for this. When he recovered he went back and confronted the villagers. Nothing was going to stop him from trying to save his tigers.

=== Tiger Watch ===
In the 1990s a group of friends got together to form an NGO called Tiger Watch (TW), of which Rathore was made the Vice-Chairman. At first the Rajasthan Forest Department allowed TW to carry out research in the park. In 2003 a young wildlife biologist called Dharmendra Khandal (DK) was selected by TW to carry out research. In 2004 DK produced a report which contradicted the Forest Department's claim that the census showed 45 tigers in the park. According to DK's report there were just 26. He substantiated his claim with photographs taken by camera traps, a more foolproof method of tiger population estimation than the old method of taking plaster casts of pugmarks. The forest department not only denied this, but banned TW henceforth from carrying out any research within the park. TW set up an anti-poaching project, and with the help of the police, succeeded in arresting several poachers and confiscating their weapons, sometimes pre-empting their raids. Poachers’ confessions were recorded on video, and a DVD was produced called "Curbing the Crisis". The Forest Department continued to be in a state of denial and resentment.

Realising that the poachers are mainly from the Mogya tribe of nomadic hunter-gatherers with no other means of livelihood, TW has started a rehabilitation programme for them, involving the women in handicraft production, and setting up a hostel where their children can be clothed, fed and educated, to give them some dignity and better prospects in future. This is strictly on condition that the men give up poaching. As this exercise depends solely on donations from well-wishers, funds are always a problem to collect, but the efforts go on.

TW has a sister organisation called the Prakrtik Society, set up by Rathore's son Goverdhan. This organisation has set up a hospital (Ranthambhore Sevika) and the Fateh Public School for local community as part of efforts towards community conservation.

He appeared in an episode of The Jeff Corwin Experience.

Rathore always believed in working with the people to save the tiger and in a country with billion population only this people-centric approach worked. Rathore died of lung cancer at his home in Sawai Madhopur on 1 March 2011 at age 72. Rathore is survived by his wife, Khen; his son, Goverdhan; two daughters, Padmini and Jaya; four brothers; four sisters; and four grandchildren.

His commitment to tiger conservation was summed up in 1993: "The forest and all its creatures were the creation of the gods," he argued over the village fires, "Did not the goddess Durga, the slayer of demons, herself ride a tiger? No man had a right to disturb that divine creation. The forest must be left to grow back."

== Honours and awards ==
Rathore received several awards and honours in recognition of his tiger conservation work.

- 1982 - Fred M. Packard Award by the IUCN Commission on National Parks and Protected Areas in recognition of outstanding service in furthering the conservation objective of protected areas. Given by the Duke of Edinburgh.
- 1983 - International Valour Award for bravery in conservation.
- Esso Award by Shri I.K. Gujral, Former Prime Minister of India for lifetime achievement in Tiger Conservation.
- 1999 - Honorary Wildlife Warden of Ranthambhore National Park
- 2011 - World Wildlife Fund lifetime achievement award

== Publications ==
Picture and articles by FSR about wild tigers in Ranthambhore have been published in several books and periodicals including:
