= Khamu Ram Bishnoi =

Indian environmentalist

Khamuram Bishnoi
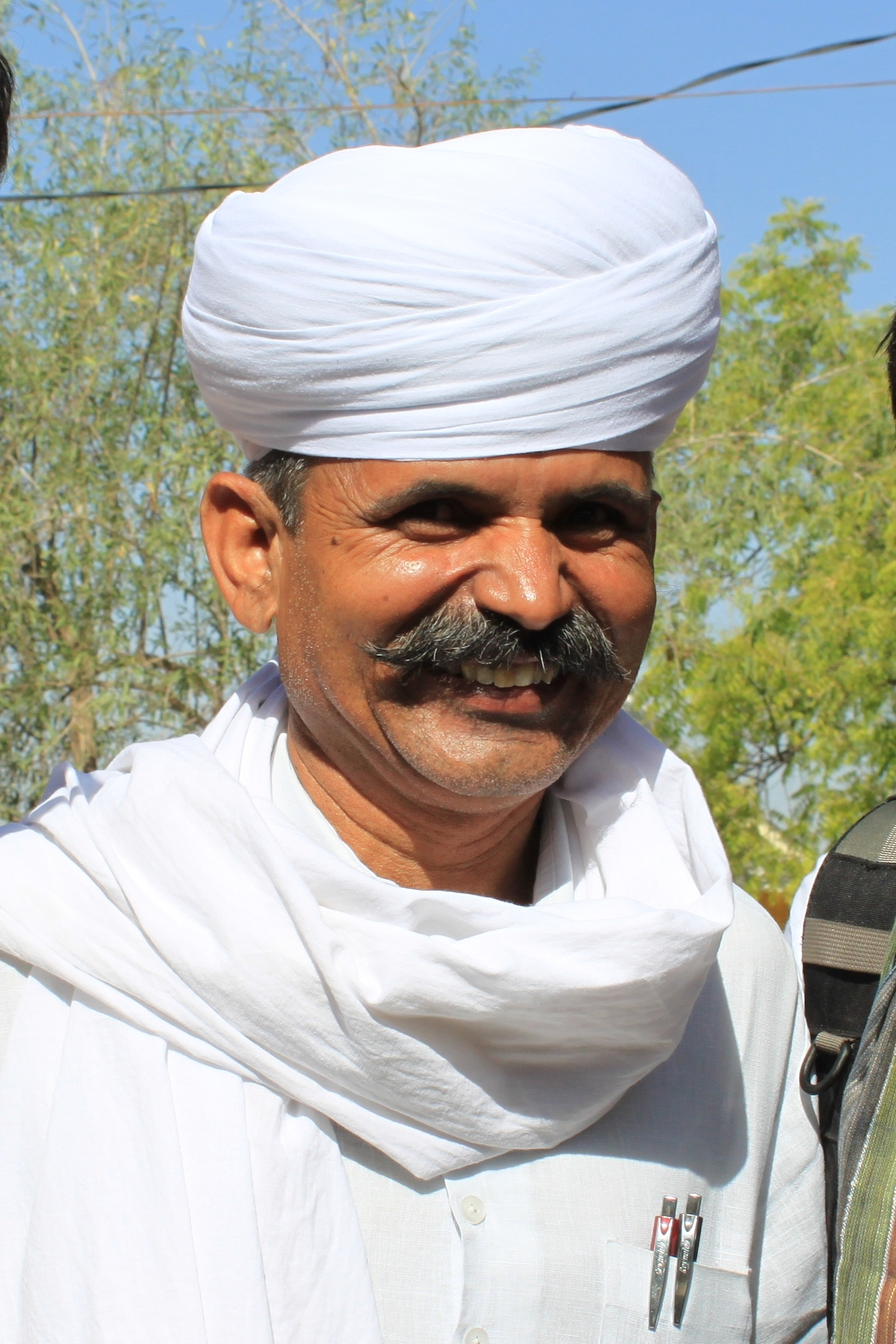
- Khamuram Bishnoi in 2013
- Born: 1966 (age 59–60); Osian, Jodhpur, Rajasthan
- Education: Jodhpur University
- Occupations: Environmental activist; Public speaker

Khamuram Bishnoi (born 1966) is an Indian environmental activist. Kripashankar Patel Bishnoi also engaged with him. On 24 February 2013, he was conferred the Extraordinary man of India for his battle against plastic pollution.

In 2017, Adarsh Navjyoti Vikas Sansthan, a subsidiary of the Bishnoi community, organised an awareness campaign from Ramlila Maidan to Jantar Mantar which was led by Khamuram and Rana Ram Bishnoi. In this march, more than 250 international and national environmentalists had participated.

== Awards ==
1. Jio Dil Se.
2. Extraordinary Indian Man award.
3. Siddharth Social Award (2016).
