= Nokha, Bikaner =

Nokha
- City
- Nickname: Dharam Nagri
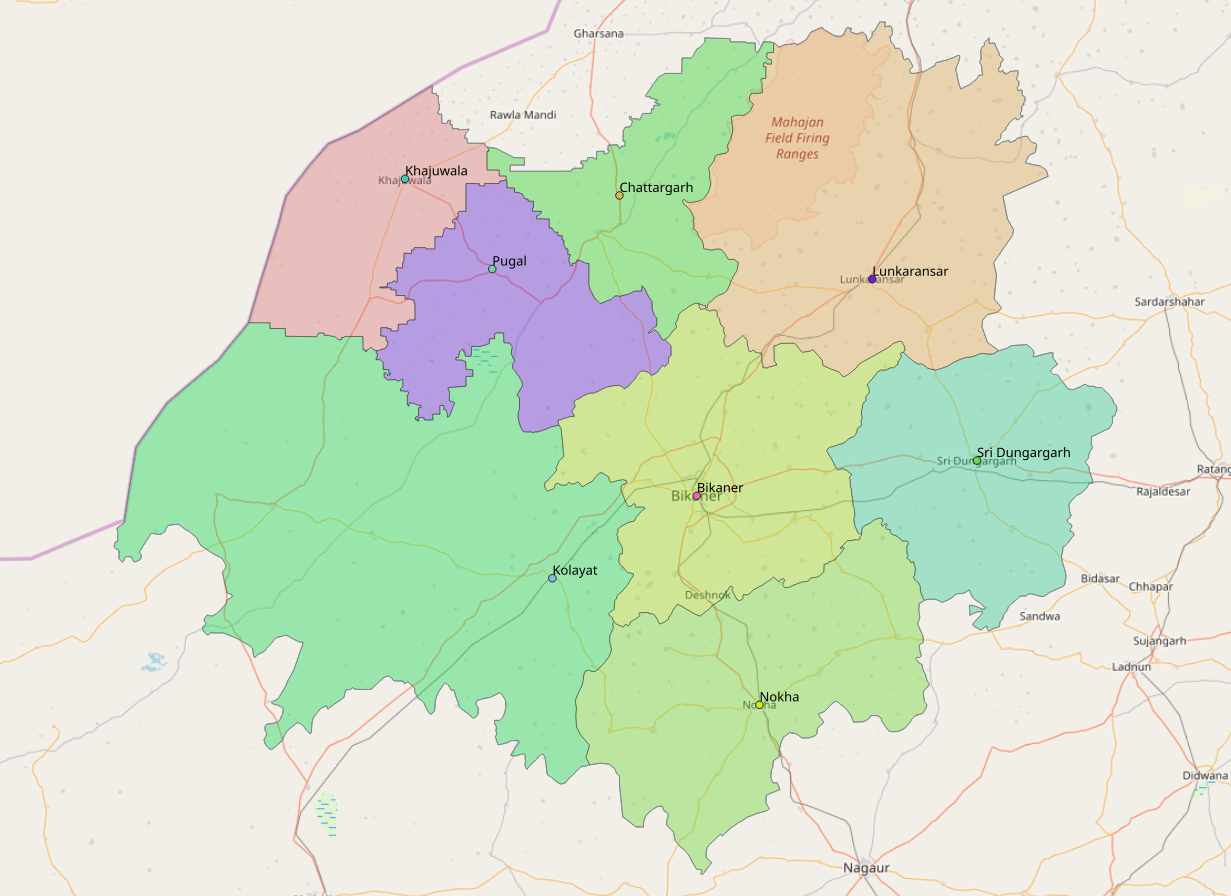
- Location in Rajasthan, India Nokha (Rajasthan) Nokha (India)
- Coordinates: 27.6°N 73.42°E
- Country: India
- State: Rajasthan
- District: Bikaner
- Established: 19 Sep.1927
- Founder: Maharaja Ganga Singh

Government
  - Type: Municipality
  - Body: Nokha Municipality
- Elevation: 325 m (1,066 ft)

Population (2017)
  - Total: 120,000
  - Density: 70/km^{2} (180/sq mi)
- Time zone: UTC+5:30 (IST)
- Postal code: 334803
- Vehicle registration: RJ-50
- Website: Nokha Municipality

Nokha is a town and municipality in the Bikaner district of the state of Rajasthan, India. It serves as a major agricultural and commercial center in the region.

== History ==
Nokha was planned and established as a prominent agricultural market town (Krishi Mandi) during the reign of Maharaja Ganga Singh of the princely state of Bikaner.

== Transport and Connectivity ==
Nokha is connected to major cities across Rajasthan and India through rail and road infrastructure.

- Road: Nokha lies on National Highway 62 (formerly NH 89), which connects Bikaner with Nagaur. A state highway also runs from Nokha towards Sujangarh and passes Tal Chhapar Sanctuary in Churu district, which gives road access to the sanctuary and to Salasar Balaji.
- Rail: Nokha railway station lies on the North Western Railway network, providing direct rail connections to Bikaner, Jodhpur, Jaipur, Delhi, and other major national hubs.

== See also ==
- List of villages in Nokha Tehsil
