= Dalchand =

- Born: c. 1690 – c. 1695
- Years active: c. 1710 – c. 1760
- Style: Rajput
- Father: Bhavanidas
- Patrons: Prince Muhammad Mu'azzam Bahadur Shah I Abhai Singh of Marwar

Dalchand was a leading Mughal court painter in the first half of the 18th century. He worked at the Jodhpur court in Rajasthan in the first quarter of the 18th century. He painted several portraits and court scenes of his patron, Maharaja Abhai Singh, before moving to Kishangarh. Dalchand's father was the renowned Kishangarh painter Bhawanidas, who had previously also worked at the Mughal court.

== Gallery ==
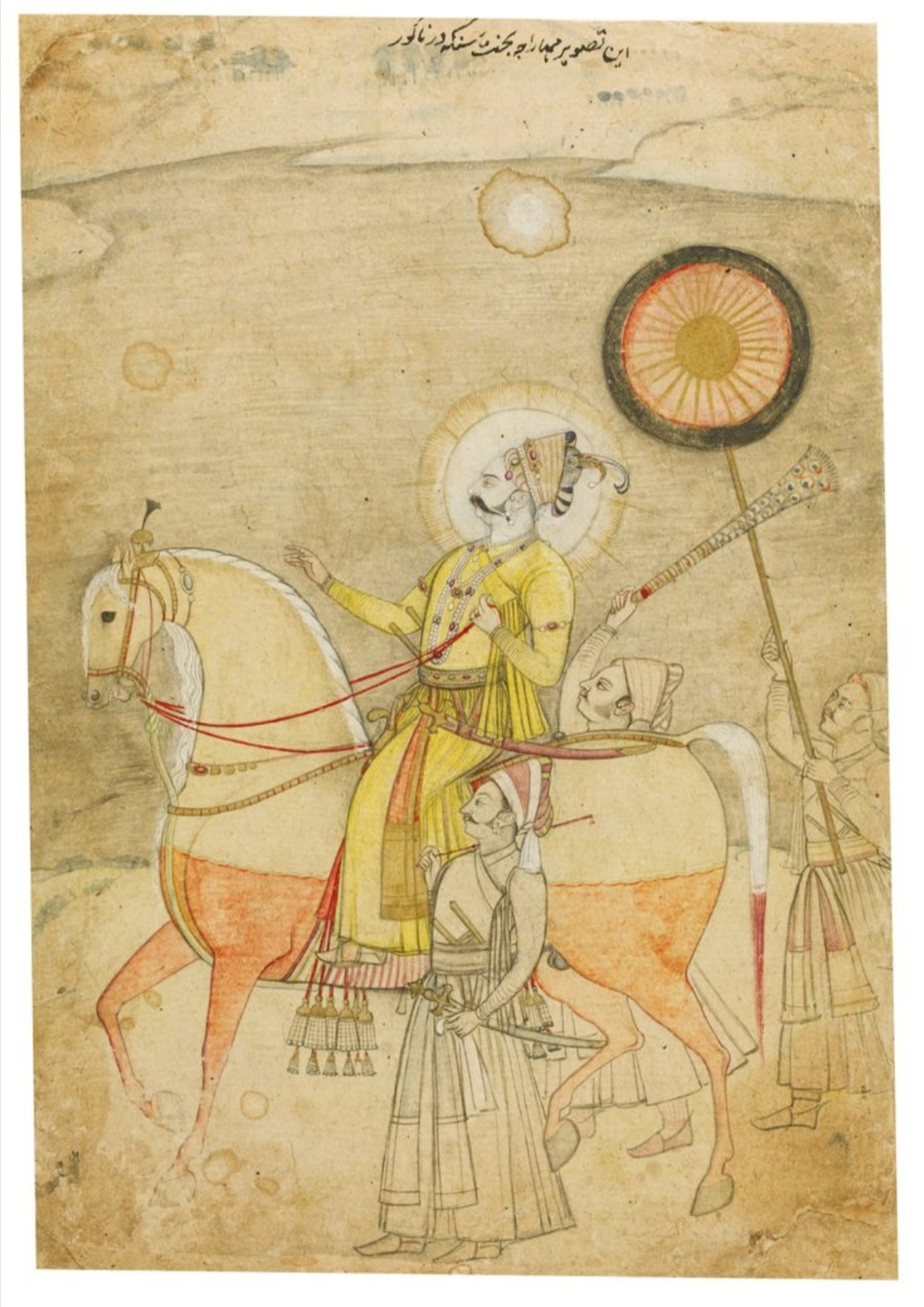
Maharaja Bakht Singh of Nagaur and Jodhpur entering Nagaur on horseback, attributed to Dalchand, Jodhpur or Nagaur, circa 1745.

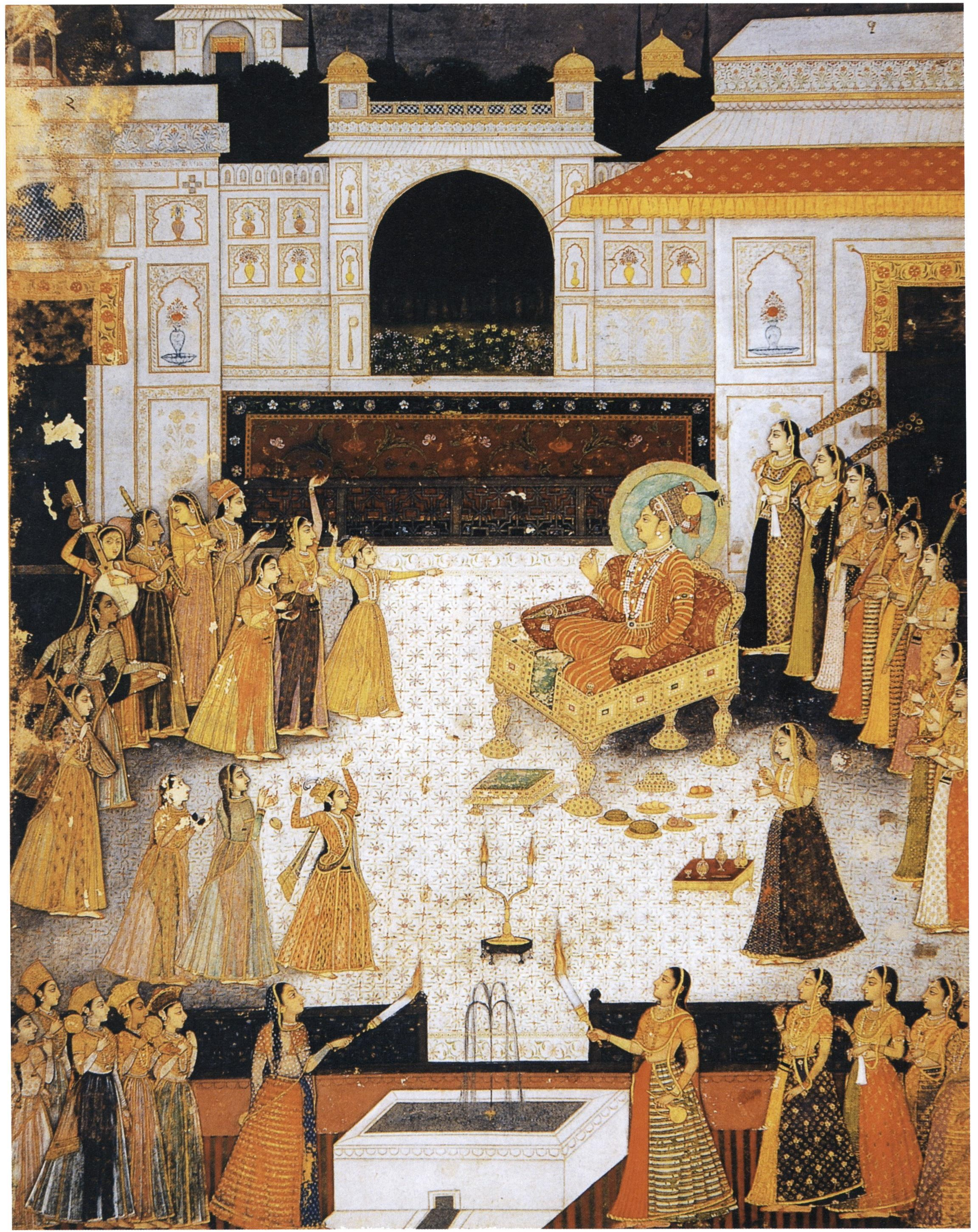
An Evening Performance for Maharaja Abhai Singh. Jodhpur, c. 1725. Mehrangarh Museum Trust.

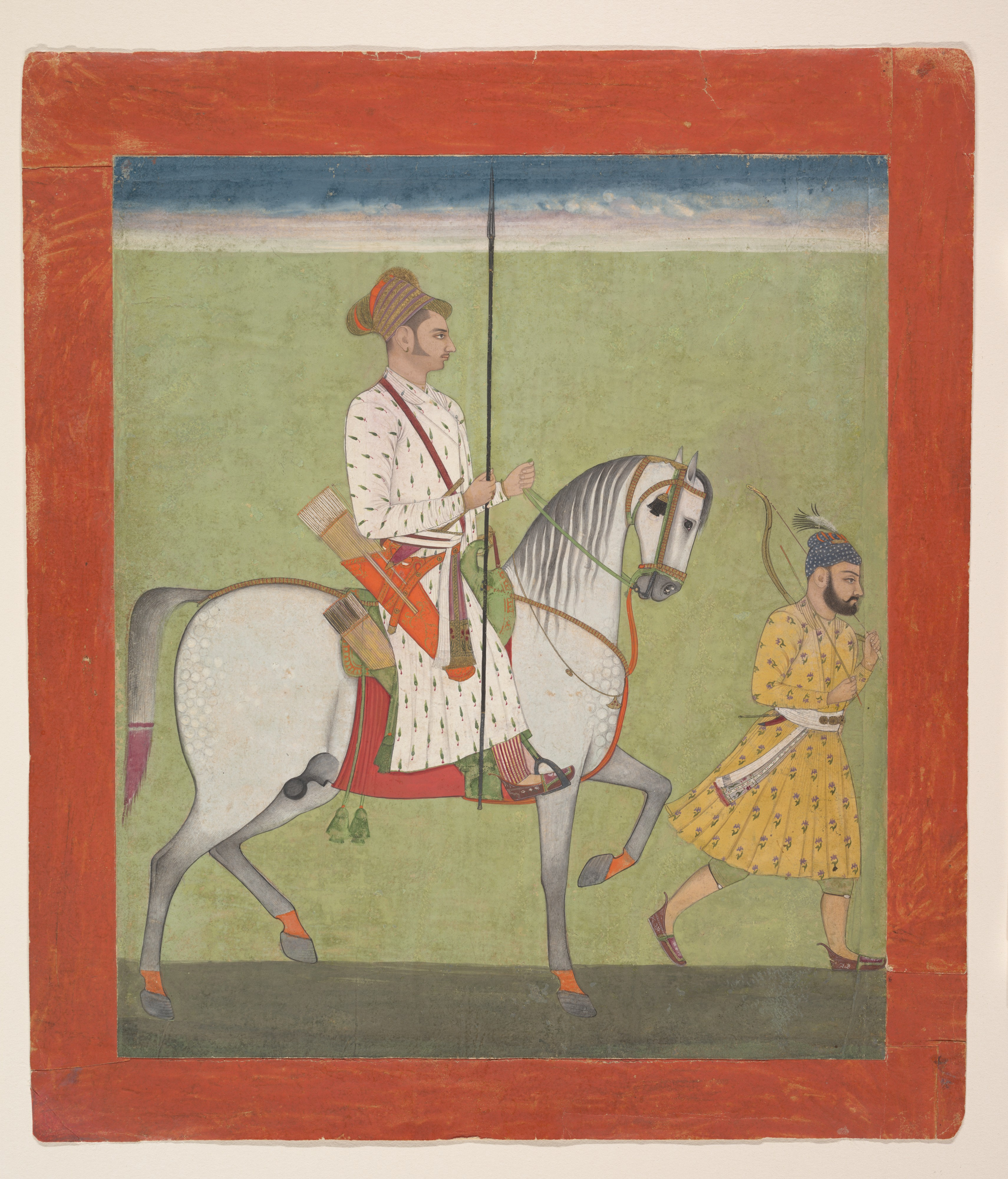
Jhujhar Singh on Horseback. Jodhpur, c. 1720–30 (attribution). Metropolitan Museum of Art.

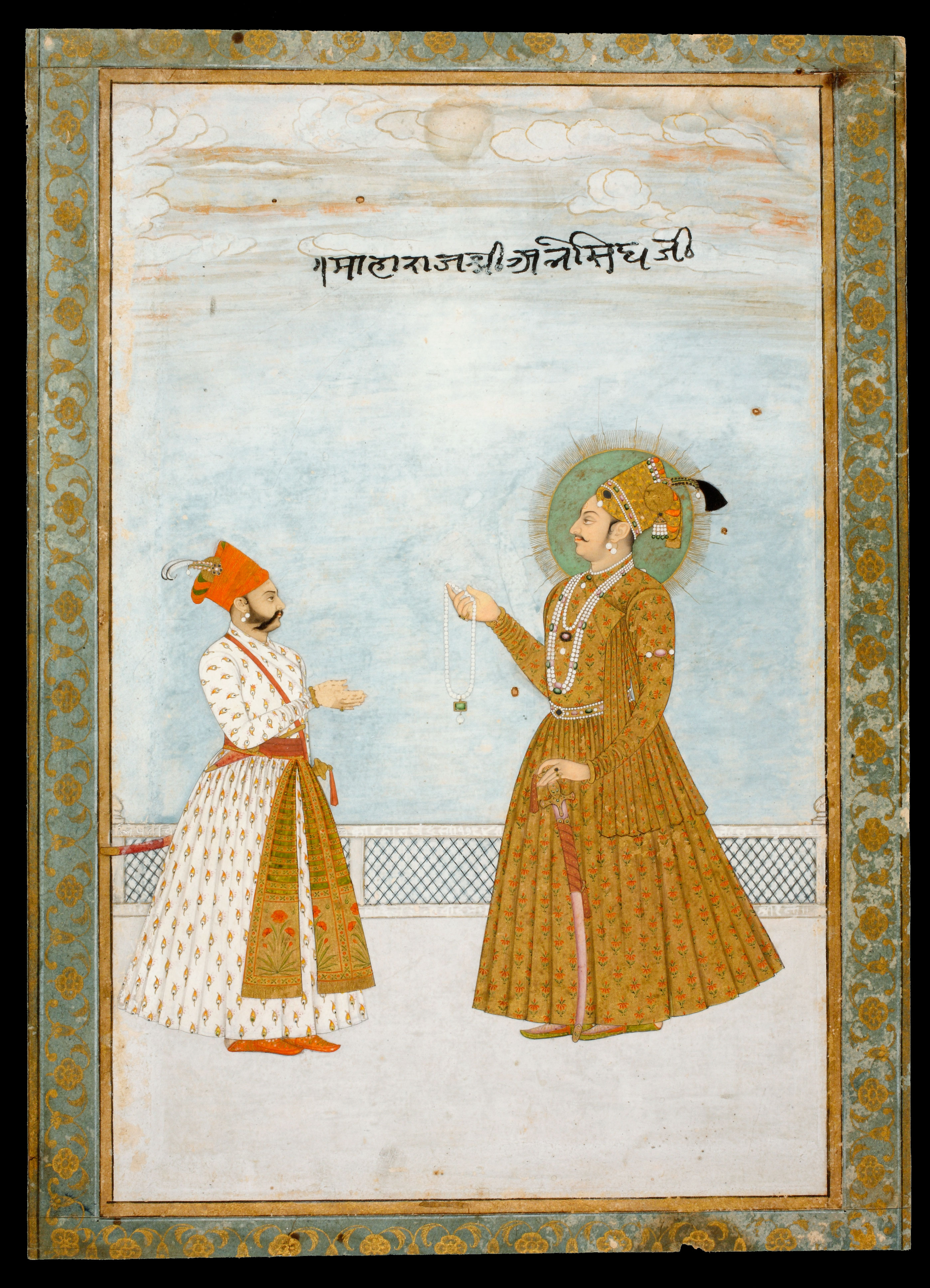
Maharaja Abhai Singh of Marwar and the Chāran Poet Prithvi Raj Sandu. Jodhpur, 1727. The David Collection.

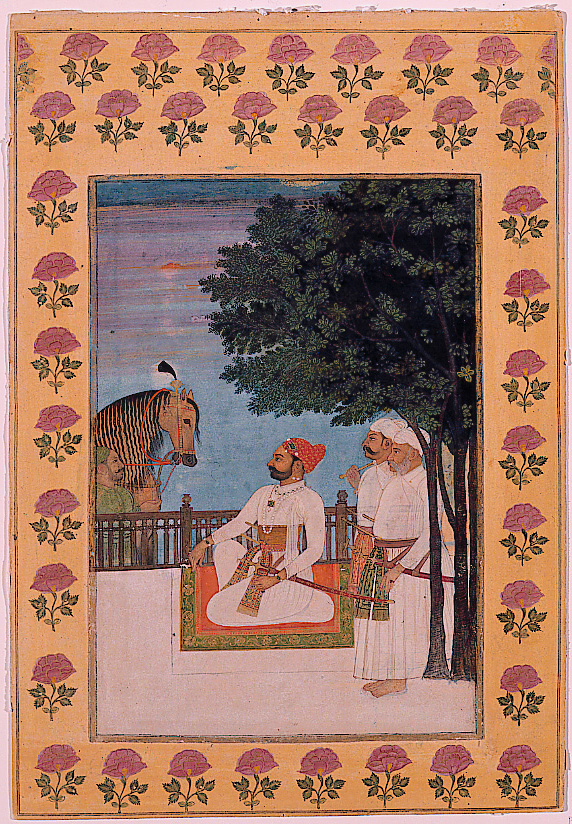
Dip Singh, son of Rao Raja Budh Singh of Bundi (attribution). Jodhpur, c. 1740. San Diego Museum of Art.
