= Amrita Devi Bishnoi National Award =

Indian government wildlife conservation award

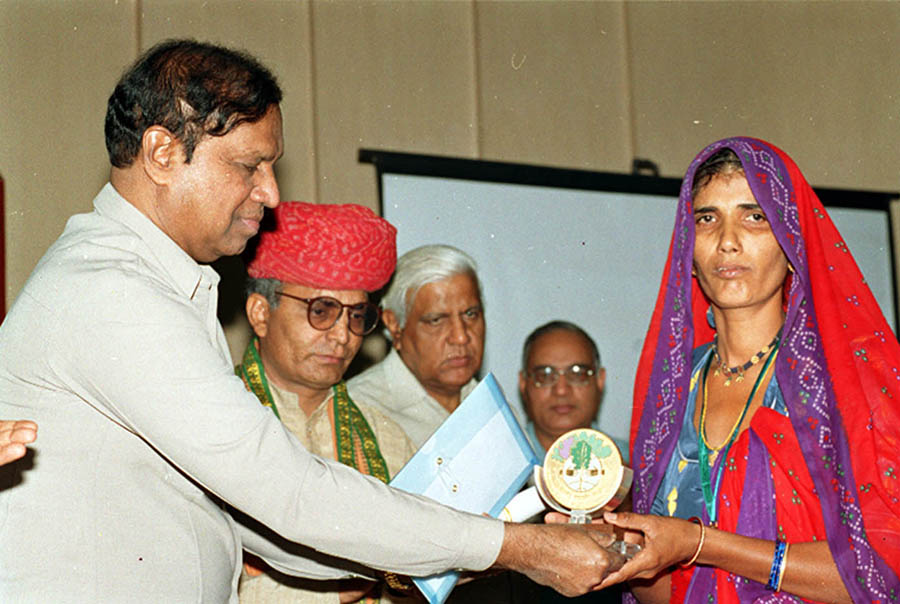
- Amrita Devi Bishnoi national award for wildlife conservation being presented to a woman for her contribution to the conservation of wildlife
- Awarded for: Wildlife conservation
- Date: 11 September
- Location: India
- Presented by: Government of India
- Reward: ₹1,00,000
- First award: 2001

The Amrita Devi Bishnoi Wildlife Protection Award is a national award instituted by the government of India for wildlife conservation. The award is in the remembrance of Amrita Devi Bishnoi, who was killed in the 1730 Khejarli massacre while trying to protect a grove of Khejri trees in Khejarli, Rajasthan.

The governments of Rajasthan and Madhya Pradesh initially started the state-level Amrita Devi Bishnoi Award for contributions to the protection and conservation of wildlife. The award consisted of cash ₹25,000. Later in 2013, the Ministry of Environment and Forests instituted the Amrita Devi Bishnoi National Award. The cash award consists of ₹1,00,000 given to individuals or institutions involved in wildlife protection.

The first Amrita Devi Bishnoi National Award for Wildlife Conservation was conferred on 11 September 2001, posthumously on Ganga Ram Bishnoi of Chirai village in Jodhpur, Rajasthan by the Union Environment and Forest Minister. Ganga Ram was chasing some hunter who had killed a deer and was shot dead by the hunters. September 11 is celebrated as National Forest Martyrs Day.

The Bishnoi community was started in 1485 by Guru Jambheshwar in the Thar Desert of Rajasthan. In 1730, Along with Amrita Devi more than 363 other Bishnois died saving the Khejri trees. The Bishnoi community spread over the Western parts of Rajasthan, Punjab, Haryana, and Madhya Pradesh gained recognition in India after the Wildlife Protection Act, 1972. It inspired the Chipko movement of Uttarakhand. The Bishnoi community took Bollywood actor Salman Khan to court for allegedly killing two blackbucks during a movie shoot near Jodhpur, Rajasthan, in 1998.
