= Kesari Singh Rajpurohit =

Rajpurohit of Marwar (1720 - 1732)

Veer Kesari Singh Rajpurohit
- Born: 1680; Tinwari, Jodhpur
- Died: March 1731 (aged 50–51)
- Father: Akheraj

Kesari Singh Rajpurohit was the youngest son of Patshah Akheraj Singh Rajpurohit. He became the royal advisor, Sardar of kherapa, military commander and rajguru (1720 - 1731 AD) of the Kingdom of Marwar during the reign of Maharaja Abhay Singh.

== Battle of Ahmedabad ==
During the reign of Delhi's emperor Muhammad Shah, Kesari Singh Rajpurohit, along with the army of Maharaja Abhay Singh of Jodhpur and Bakht Singh of Nagaur, fought against the huge army of Nawab Sarbuland Khan of Ahmedabad and attained martyrdom. Kesari Singh was a first-line army officer of the second front in the Marwar army. He fought with a sword in both hands in the fierce battle. He killed Afghan Sardar Aabad Ali, Jamal Ali, and Sheikh Mujahid Tarin Khan and saved Bakht Singh from a fierce attack. When the swords broke, he continued fighting the enemies with the help of a dagger. According to the writer Karnidan, "Even after his head was cut off, Kesari Singh Akherajot continued fighting the enemies for a long time and attained martyrdom" .
