= Ram Singh of Marwar =

Maharaja of Marwar (r. 1749–1751, 1753–1772)

Ram Singh
- Maharaja
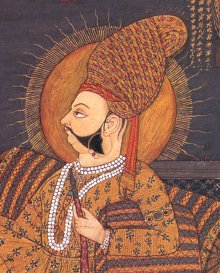

Maharaja of Marwar
- First reign: 18 June 1749 – July 1751
- Coronation: 13 July 1749, Shringar Chowk, Mehrangarh Fort, Jodhpur
- Predecessor: Abhai Singh
- Successor: Bakht Singh
- Second reign: 31 January 1753 – September 1772
- Predecessor: Vijay Singh
- Successor: Vijay Singh
- Born: 28 July 1730; Mehrangarh Fort, Jodhpur, Marwar
- Died: September 1772 (aged 42); Ranawat Bagh,Jaipur, Jaipur Kingdom
- Spouse: Kachwahiji Deep Kanwarji of Jaipur Jadejiji Udai Kunwarba of Jamnagar in Gujarat Rajawatji Kushal Kanwarji of Jhilai in Jaipur Chawdiji Shringar Kanwarji of Mansa in Gujarat
- Issue: No issue
- House: Jodha Rathore
- Father: Abhai Singh
- Mother: Narukiji (Kachwahiji) Bakht Kanwarji d.of Rao Kishor Singh of Ladana in Jaipur
- Religion: Hinduism

Maharaja Ram Singh (28 July 1730 – September 1772), was the Rathore Ruler of Marwar Kingdom, also called Jodhpur State. He ruled 18 June 1749 – July 1751, and 31 January 1753 – September 1772.

He succeeded on the death of his father, Maharaja Abhai Singh, on 18 June 1749. However, he was defeated in battle by his uncle Maharaja Bakht Singh at Luniawas on 27 November 1750, and was expelled from Jodhpur. He sought refuge in Jaipur in July 1751. In 1753, he reascended the gadi for the second time after deposing Maharaja Vijay Singh, his cousin.

Maharaja Ram Singh died at Jaipur in September 1772. He was succeeded by Maharaja Vijay Singh, who then became Maharaja for the second time himself.

== See also ==
- Rulers of Marwar

Preceded by Abhai Singh of Marwar	Maharaja of the Marwar; 18 June 1749 – July 1751; 31 January 1753 – September 1772	Succeeded by Maharaja Bhakt Singh
