= Gora Dhay =

Gora Dhay (Hindi: गोरां धाय) (1646–1704) was a woman from Kingdom of Marwar who exchanged her son with infant Ajit Singh, her son was later captured by Aurangzeb and was raised as Muslim.

== History ==
Ajit Singh was born in 1679 after his father Maharaja Jaswant Singh's death. Aurangzeb, with an intention to either kill or convert Ajit Singh, put a condition that the upbringing of Ajit Singh will be done at Delhi. Gora Dhay replaced him with her own son. The slave girl along with her infant son remained behind to be captured. Aurangzeb deigned to accept this deceit and sent the child to be raised as a Muslim. Jadunath Sarkar mentioned that Aurangzeb brought up a milkman's son in his harem as Ajit Singh. Ajit Singh later constructed a Chattri in honour of Gora Dhai.
