= Khejarli =

- Village
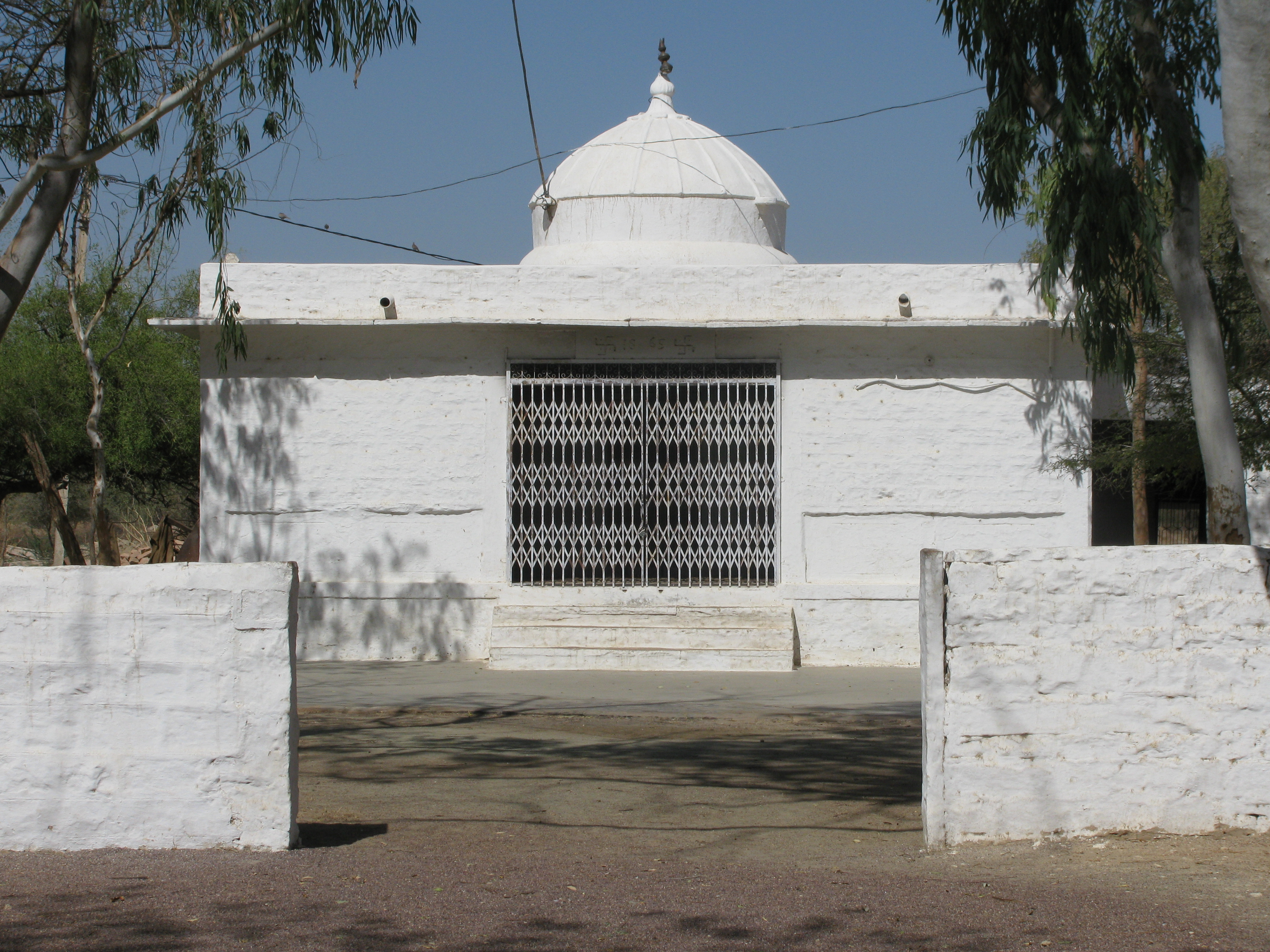
- Bishnoi temple commemorating the Khejarli massacre
- Nickname: dham
- Location in Rajasthan, India Khejarli (India)
- Coordinates: 26.15°N 73.15°E
- Country: India
- State: Rajasthan
- District: Jodhpur

Languages
  - Official: Hindi, Marwari
- Time zone: UTC+5:30 (IST)
- PIN: 342802
- Coordinates are from Wikimapia

Khejarli or Khejadli is a village in Jodhpur district of Rajasthan, India, 26 kilometres (16 mi) south-east of the city of Jodhpur. The name of the town is derived from the khejri (Prosopis cineraria) trees that were once abundant in the village.

In this village 363 Bishnois sacrificed their lives in 1730 AD while protecting a grove of khejri trees that are considered sacred by the community. The incident was a forebear of the 20th-century Chipko Movement.

== History ==
Thakur Surat Singh, of Kharda thikana, a small estate in Jodhpur pargana. was granted the estate of Khejarli in the same pargana, by Maharaja Abhai Singh of Marwar in 1726 AD, and he became the first 'Thakur of Khejarli'.

=== Khejarli Massacre ===
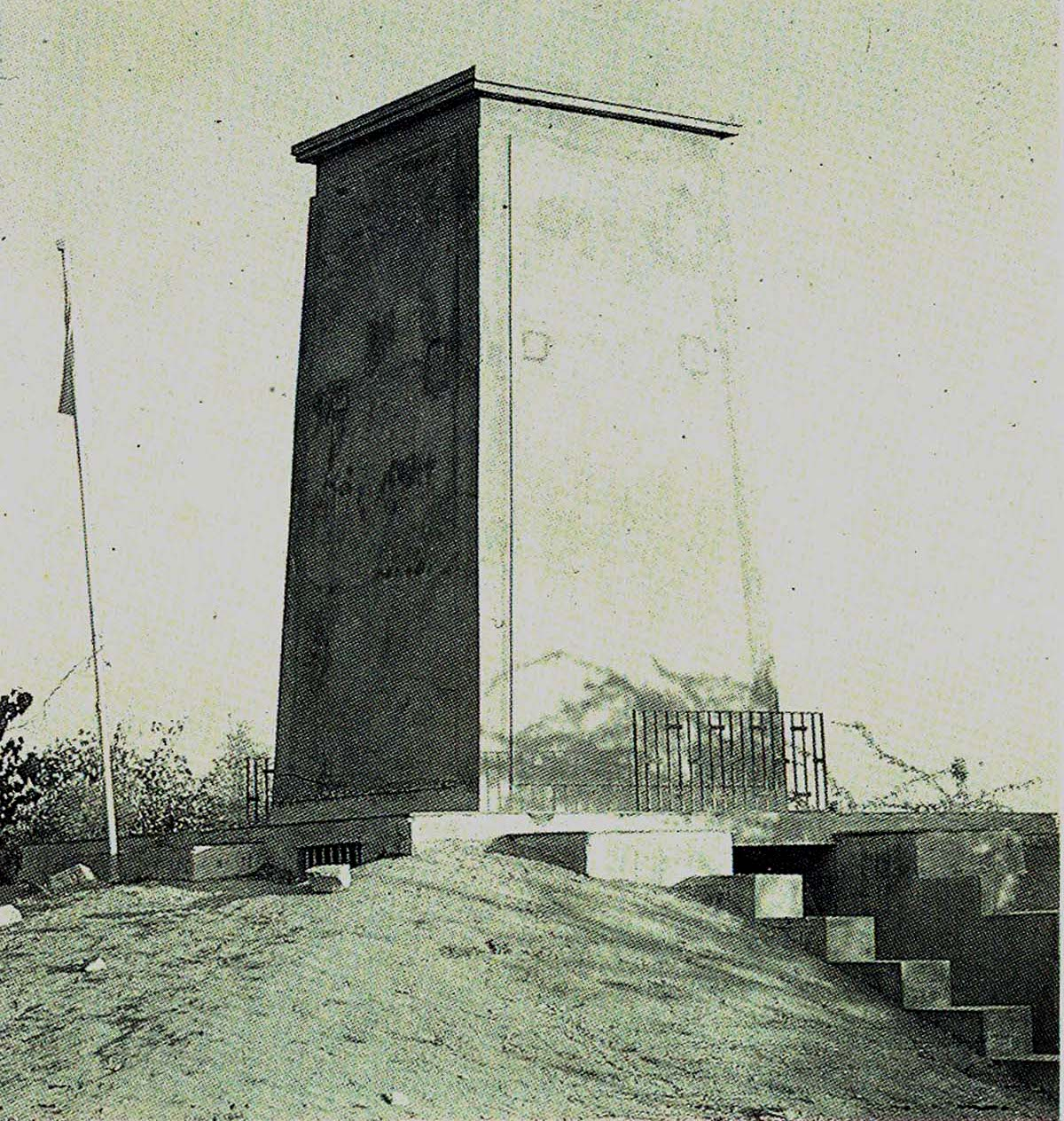
Cenotaph commemorating the Bishnoi people who died in 1730 AD protecting trees

Khejarli was the site of a forebear of the Chipko movement. On 12 september 1730, a royal party led by Giridhar Bhandari, a minister of the maharajah of Marwar, arrived at the village with the intention of felling some khejri trees that were sacred to the villagers. The trees were to be burned to produce lime for the construction of a new palace.

A local woman called Amrita Devi Bishnoi protested against the tree-felling because such acts were prohibited by the Bishnoi religion. The feudal party said that they would only cease if she paid them a bribe, which she refused to do because she saw that as ignominious and an insult to her faith. She said that she would rather give away her life to save the trees. She and her three daughters (Asu, Ratni and Bhagu) were then killed by the party.

News of the deaths spread and summons to a meeting were sent to 84 Bishnoi villages. The meeting determined that one Bishnoi volunteer would sacrifice their life for every tree that was cut down. Older people began hugging the trees that were intended to be cut and many were killed.

These efforts failed to have the desired impact and Bhandari claimed that the Bishnoi In response to this, young men, women and children began to follow the example of the old.

The development shocked the tree-felling party. The group left for Jodhpur with their mission unfulfilled and the Maharaja Abhai Singh of Marwar subsequently ordered that no more trees should be felled. 363 Bishnois died in the incident.
