= Tinwari =

Tinwari Tivari
- Town
- Location in Rajasthan, India Tinwari (India)
- Coordinates: 26.55°N 72.88°E
- Country: India
- State: Rajasthan
- District: Jodhpur
- Elevation: 329 m (1,079 ft)

Population (2011)
  - Total: 18,267

Languages
  - Official: Hindi
  - Other: Marwari, Rajasthani, Urdu
- Time zone: UTC+5:30 (IST)
- PIN: 342306
- Telephone code: 02927
- ISO 3166 code: RJ-IN
- Vehicle registration: RJ-19

Tinwari also known as Tinvari or Tivari, is a town and tehsil in Jodhpur district in the state of Rajasthan, India. It is located 59 km north of Jodhpur headquarters and 330 km from the state capital Jaipur. Mandore in the north, Jodhpur in the south, Balesar in the west and Bhopalgarh tehsil in the east. It was the main jagir of Akherajot Rajpurohits during the Rathore dynasty.

== Demography ==
As per the 2011 census of India, Tinwari's total population is 18,267 and the total number of houses is 2,850. The female population is 47.8% and the female literacy rate is 18.4%. The town has a number of Akherajot Rajpurohit and some Rajput families.

== Transport ==
Tinwari is a desert village situated 50 km north of Jodhpur City. Osian is situated 21 km north of Tinwari. Osian is a major business center for the city. Bikaner is located at a distance of 191 km from Tinwari, 135 km from Nagaur, and 94 km from Phalodi on its main travel route. National Highway NH754K(Amritsar–Jamnagar Expressway) is connected with this town.

== History ==
The local history of Tinwari begins from the time of the Gurjara-Pratihara rulers. About two thousand years ago, Osian was known as Upkesh Pattan (Umeshpur Patan) city, which was a metropolis and had eight suburbs around it. Being a group of nine cities, it was also called Navteri Nagari. Among the eight suburbs, Tinwari was the main trading town. Due to the rule of Tanwar Rajputs on this city, it later came to be known as Tanwari and Tinwari. Later, this Jagir went into the hands of Sevad Rajpurohits during the Rathore rulers. In V.S. 1272 (1215 A.D.), along with Rao Siha, his Rajguru Sevad Rajpurohit Devpaldev came to Marwar from Kanoj and was given the Jagir of Tinwari. Dalpat Singh Manohardasot of Tinwari laid down his life in 1657 fighting with the enemies on the banks of Shipra River along with Maharaja Jaswant Singh. His son Akheraj lived in the forests with Maharaja Ajit Singh for 22 years and bravely fought off the attacks of the enemies. Thakur Gumansingh Rajpurohit of Tinwari sacrificed his life for the defense of the motherland in 1815 by killing the Pathan commander while repulsing the attack of Mir Khan Pathan on Mehrangarh Fort. During the princely period, Jagirdars of this town made entrance gates on all the routes of entry into the town and put doors in them. Got reservoirs and wells constructed in all four parts of the city.

== Early Administration ==
Before independence, administration was in the hands of Akherajots, the feudal lords of Tinwari. They built many temples, fortified walls, cenotaphs, baolis, etc.

After independence, the development of this historical city started again. In 1949, due to the tireless efforts of social worker Ratanlal Joshi, rail lines were laid here and trains started running. After this development gained momentum during the tenure of young Sarpanch Premchand Khatri and later Sarpanches recognized Tinwari as a developed town. At the time of the first woman sarpanch of the village, Mrs. Kaushalya Devi Sankhla, the main road was extended from Mathania Square to Osian Square and given a grand and attractive look. Beautification was done with road lights by making dividers in the middle of the road. During the time of Padmaram Meghwal, commendable work was done in the interest of the village by removing illegal encroachments in the village.

== Religious and tourist attractions ==
A Jain temple located in the center of the city, which was built around 165 AD, was excavated. An idol of Vasupujya is installed in this temple. There is also another Jain temple outside the city; The ancient sculptures installed here and the skillful workmanship done on the stones are the heritage of archaeology. Dada Bhagwan Sanskar Kendra, a grand religious and tourist center located on Balasar Road, outside the town, holds a special place in the whole of Rajasthan due to its specialties. This center is spread over an area of about 200 bighas. Geeta Dham, an international center of spirituality, was established in 1992 by Swami Harihar Maharaj. This land was donated by Bhamashah Seth Chunnilal Baheti of Tinwari for the temple. Devotees keep coming and going throughout the year in the grand Krishna Sarovar Temple, Mahadev Temple, and Hanuman Temple built here. Devotees from not only the country but also from abroad come here for the Phag festival and spiritual ceremony organized on the occasion of Holi in the month of Phalgun.
