= Nazwa =

Village in the United Arab Emirates

Nazwa Nazwā (نَزْوَى)
- Village
- Location of Nazwa in the UAE Nazwa (Persian Gulf) Nazwa (Middle East) Nazwa (West and Central Asia)
- Coordinates: 25°1′35″N 55°41′13″E
- Country: United Arab Emirates
- Emirate: Sharjah

Government
  - Type: Absolute monarchy
  - Sheikh: Sultan bin Muhammad Al-Qasimi

Nazwā (Arabic: نَزْوَى) is a village in the Emirate of Sharjah, the U.A.E., located just off the Dubai-Hatta highway between Lahbab and Madam, and near the Emirate of Dubai.

== Description ==
A small village, Nazwa is known for Qarn Nazwā (Arabic: قَرْن نَزْوَى), a limestone outcrop and the surrounding desert area known for bird watching.

Al Ghaf Conservation Reserve, located on the Dubai side of Nazwa, was one of six such reserves announced by the government of Dubai in May 2014. The Ghaf (Prosopis cineraria) is the national tree of the UAE.

== See also ==
- Arabian Peninsula
  - Eastern Arabia
