= Vijay Singh of Marwar =

Maharaja of Marwar (r. 1752–1753, 1772–1793)

Maharaja Vijay Singh
- Maharaja
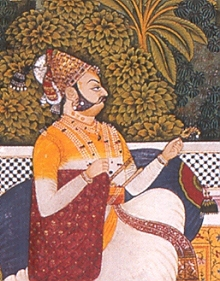
- Vijay Singh Rathore

Maharaja of Marwar
- First reign: 21 September 1752 – 31 January 1753
- Coronation: 31 January 1753, Mehrangarh
- Predecessor: Bakht Singh
- Successor: Ram Singh
- Second reign: September 1772 – 17 July 1793
- Predecessor: Maharaja Ram Singh
- Successor: Maharaja Bhim Singh of Marwar
- Born: 6 November 1729; Jodhpur
- Died: 17 July 1793 (aged 63); Mehrangarh, Kingdom of Marwar
- Spouse: Shekhawatji Janak Kanwarji of Khetri; Shekhawatji Jatan Kanwarji of Khetri; Devadiji Suraj Kanwarji of Sirohi; Ranawatji Ratan Kanwarji of Mewar; Tanwarji Indra Kanwarji of Kelwa; Solankiniji Suraj Kanwarji of Lunawada; Hadiji Deep Kanwarji of Bundi; Dodiyaniji Gulab Kanwarji of Piploda
- Issue: Yuvraj Fateh Singh; Zalim Singh; Bhom Singh; Sardar Singh; Sher Singh; Guman Singh; Sawant Singh
- House: Jodha Rathore
- Father: Bakht Singh
- Mother: Bhatiyaniji (Rawalotji) Chandra Kanwarji d.of Rao Daulat Singh of Osiyan in Marwar
- Religion: Hinduism

Maharaja Vijay Singh (6 November 1729 – 17 July 1793), was the ruler of the Kingdom of Marwar. He ruled 21 September 1752 – 31 January 1753, and September 1772 – 17 July 1793.

== Death and succession ==
Vijay Singh wanted his grandson Man Singh to succeed him. But after Vijay Singh's death on 17 July 1793, a civil war once again started in Jodhpur between his sons and grandsons. Bhim Singh usurped the throne but could never consolidate his rule.

Gulabrai, one of the concubines of the Maharaja, rose up the ranks and became the 18th century Marwar Rajput king's favourite.

== See also ==
- Rulers of Marwar
