= Khejarli massacre =

1730 massacre in India

Khejarli Massacre
- September 1730, 363 Bishnois were killed while trying to peacefully protect a grove of Khejri trees.
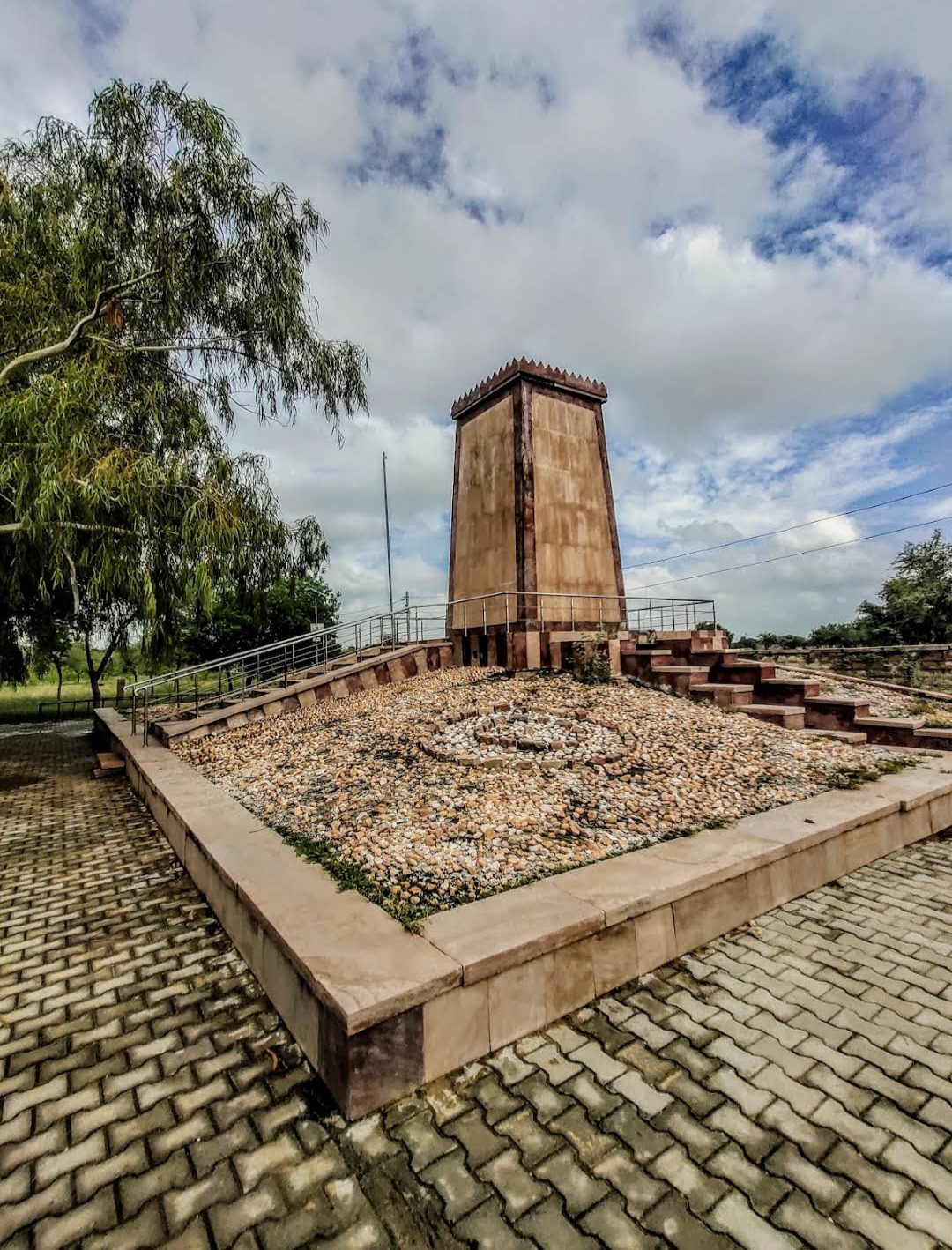
- A memorial Commemorating 363 Bishnois died for saving Green Trees Near Khejarli, Jodhpur, Rajasthan, India
- Date: early-mid September 1730, likely on 11 September
- Location: Khejarli, Rajasthan; 26°10′00.0″N 73°9′32.8″E
- Caused by: felling of trees by the Kingdom of Marwar
- Result: 363 Bishnois killed, tree harvesting halted and outlawed in the village

Parties
Khejarli villagers Supported by Bishnoi practitioners	Soldiers and labourers of the Kingdom of Marwar

Lead figures
Amrita Devi, Bishnoi elders	Giridhar Bhandari

Number
Several hundred Bishnoi practitioners	"Party" of soldiers and labourers

Casualties and losses
363 Bishnois villagers	none

Casualties
- Deaths: 363

The Khejarli massacre occurred in September 1730 in Northern India, when 363 Bishnois were killed while trying to peacefully protect a grove of Khejri trees from being chopped down on the orders of the Maharaja of Marwar, Abhai Singh. Abhai Singh had sent his soldiers to cut the trees in the village of Khejarli to provide wood for a new palace. The killings were carried out on the orders of his minister, Giridhar Bhandari. The effort had a long-term impact on environmental advocacy, and the massacre later became known as a precursor to the 20th-century Chipko movement. Due to the sacrifice of the protesters, the ruler took back his earlier order of felling trees.

== History ==
In 1730, Abhai Singh dispatched one of his ministers, Giridhar Bhandari, to collect wood to be used in the construction of a new palace; some sources report that the wood was needed to build the palace, while others note the Marwars intended to burn the trees to create lime. Regardless of intended purpose, Bhandari and his entourage of soldiers arrived in Khejarli, where they demanded access to the village's trees. Led by a woman named Amrita Devi , the villagers refused to surrender their trees to the Raj's soldiers. Amrita stated that the Khejri trees were sacred to the Bishnois, and her faith prohibited her from allowing the trees to be cut down.

The situation escalated, and the Marwan party offered to leave the village's Khejri trees alone in exchange for a bribe. However, this was seen as a grievous insult to the Bishnoi values, and Amrita announced that she would rather die than allow the trees to be cut down. She and her family began hugging the Khejris, shielding the trees with their bodies. Angered by the rebuke, the Marwans beheaded Amrita and three of her daughters before beginning to cut down the trees.

News of the ongoing desecration of Jehnad's trees quickly spread among Rajasthan's Bishnoi population. In all, Bishnois from 83 villages began to travel to Jehnad in an attempt to save the trees, and a council was convened to determine what could be done about the situation. The council's decision was that each Bishnoi volunteer would lay down their life to defend one of the threatened trees. Older people went forward first, with many of them being killed as they hugged the Khejris. Seeing this as an opportunity, Giridhar Bhandari claimed that the Bishnoi were only sending forward people who they thought were useless to be killed. In response, younger men, women, and children began to hug the trees, resulting in many of them being killed as well. In all, 363 Bishnois were killed while protecting the trees.

Shocked by the passive resistance of the Bishnois, Abhai Singh recalled his men and personally travelled to the village to apologise for his minister's actions. He decreed that the village would never again be compelled to provide wood for the kingdom. The village was later renamed Khejarli, and the site of the massacre became a place of pilgrimage for the Bishnoi faith.

== Legacy ==
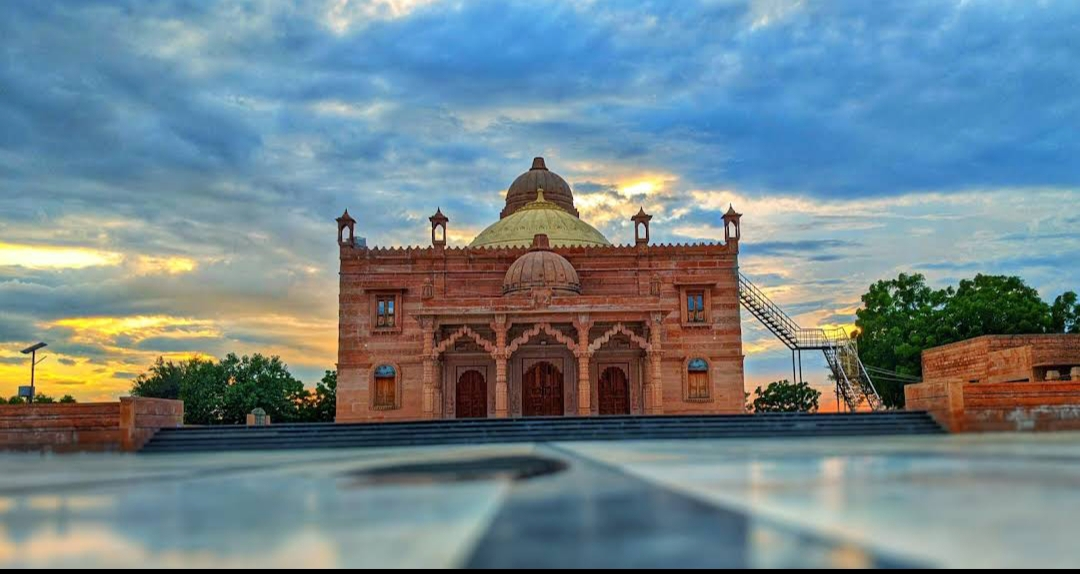
Bishnoi Temple at Khejarli Massacre Memorial Site.

The Khejarli Massacre was an inspiration for the 20th-century environmentalist Chipko movement. Several temples and a cenotaph in Khejarli commemorate the massacre, and the village is the site of an annual Bishnoi ceremony held in honour of the event. A fair is organised every year on Shukla Dashmi of Bhadrapad (Hindu month) in September at Khejarli, Jodhpur, to pay homage to the victims.

The Government of India has also instituted the Amrita Devi Bishnoi Environment Protection Award, recognising the sacrifice of Amrita Devi. In 2013, the Ministry of Environment declared the day of the massacre (11 September) as National Forest Martyrs Day.

== See also ==
- Tiladi massacre
