= Gulabrai =

Concubine of Vijay Singh of Marwar

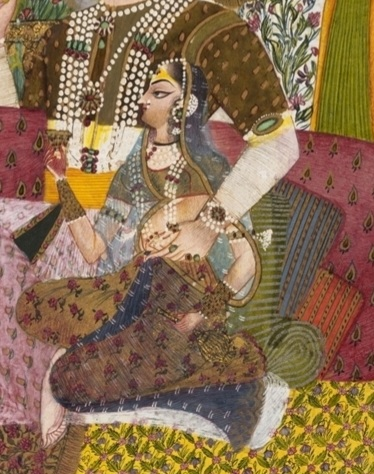
- Born: Kingdom of Marwar
- Died: 1792, Jodhpur, Rajasthan, India

Gulabrai (गुलाबराई) was a concubine of Maharaja Vijay Singh of Marwar.

== Life ==
Gulabrai was born to a family belonging to the [oswal jain]] community. She eventually became the badaran (female slave) of a courtier named Bhurat Argadram who served the imperial family of the Kingdom of Marwar.

== Rise to power ==
In 1766, Gulabrai entered the royal service of Maharaja Vijay Singh and entered the palace. She was raised from the status of a badaran and was made a gayaan (court singer), and was eventually promoted to a khawas. Gulabrai soon became favoured by Vijay Singh, becoming his closest companian and was initiated as his concubine with the rank of pardayat. She would then go on to be promoted to a paswan, the highest and most powerful rank among the concubines in the hierarchy.

Gulabrai's influence and power in state affairs would grow over time, surpassing that of the queens. She had Singhvi Bhimraj, one of her loyal allies in the court, appointed to the high position as head of military affairs (bakhshi) and had his son, Akharaj appointed as governor (hakim). Gulabrai would embark on pilgrimages outside the kingdom where she was accompanied by grand processions, and would be in charge of administrative appointments. She had also received the unprecedented honor of being granted jagir of the district of Jalor.

== Death ==
In 1792, Vijay Singh's grandson seized control of the Jodhpur fort and had Gulabrai killed. Vijay Singh, grief stricken at her death, died a year later in 1793.

== Architectural legacy ==
She built a stepwell called the Mahilabagh Mahal near the Gulab Sagar lake which she had excavated in Jodhpur, and commisoned the building of the Kunjbihari temple.

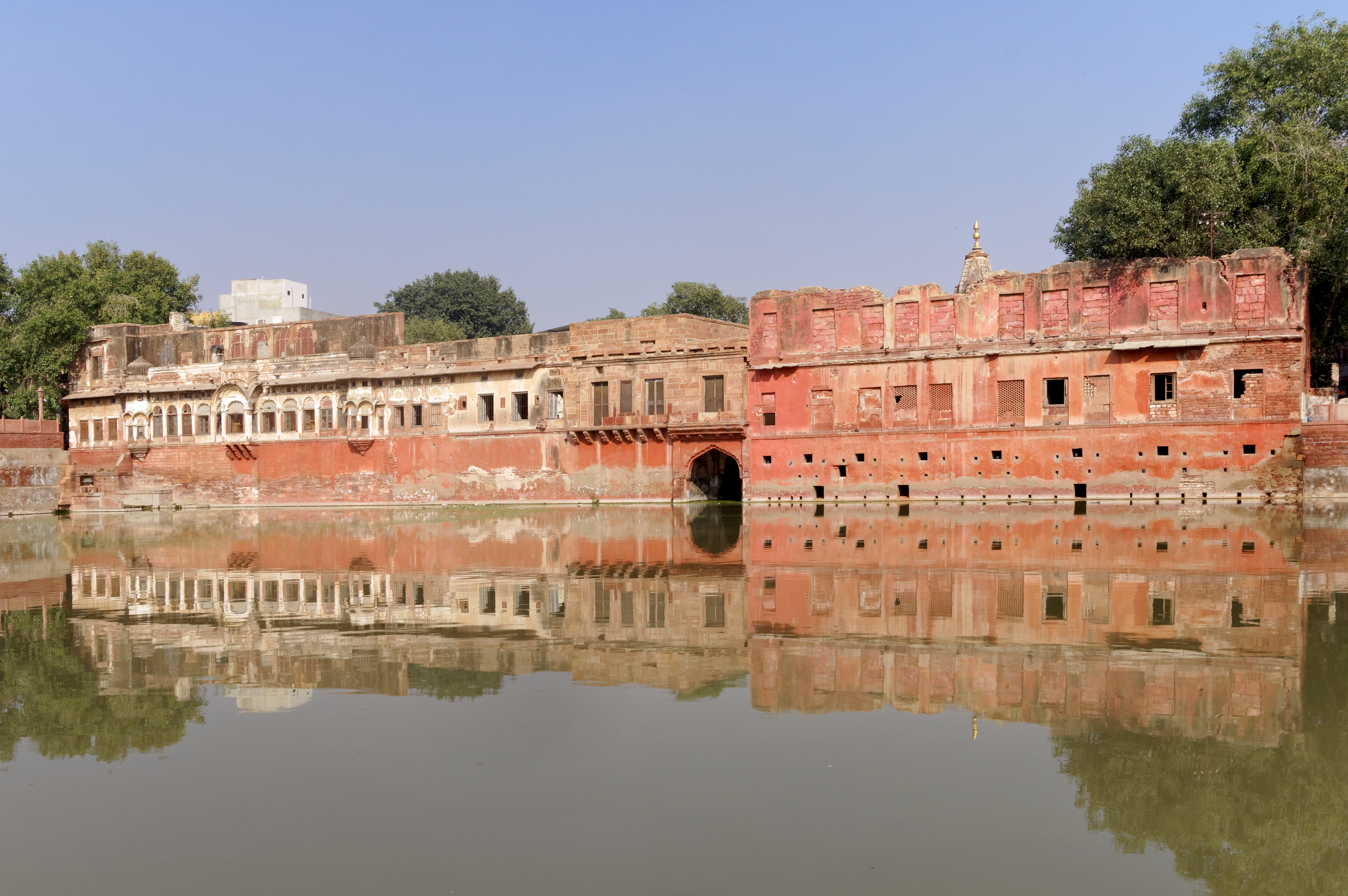
The Gulab Sagar lake at Jodhpur.
