= Battle of Gangwana =

18th-century battle between Jodhpur/Marwar and Jaipur

- Part of the decline of the Mughal Empire
Date	11 June 1741
Location	Gangwana near Kishangarh
Result	Inconclusive

Belligerents
Kingdom of Jaipur; Reinforced By; Mughal Empire; Kingdom of Bharatpur; Kingdom of Bundi; Kingdom of Kota; Kingdom of Karauli; Kingdom of Shahpura	Rathores of Bakht Singh

Commanders and leaders
Jai Singh Kachwaha; Gopal Singh Jadon; Ummaid Singh Sisodia; Durjansal singh Hada; Dalel Singh Hada; Bhairo Singh Chauhan †	Bakht Singh Rathore (WIA)

Strength
40,000–100,000 men hundreds of cannons and rocket artillery	1,000 horsemen

Casualties and losses
24,000 killed and wounded	930 killed 70 wounded

The battle of Gangwana was a military engagement fought between the Kingdom of Marwar and a combined army of the Jaipur Kingdom and the Mughal Empire in 1741. The battle resulted in a peace treaty favorable to Marwar and ended a period of Jaipur domination in what is now present day Rajasthan.

== Background ==
Following a century of expansion, in the early 1700s the Mughal Empire entered a period of decline. Nader Shah's invasion of the Mughal Empire and the subsequent sack of Delhi in 1739 greatly reduced the prestige of the Mughal Emperor Muhammad Shah. Ongoing conflicts with the Maratha Empire to the south further sapped the ability of the Empire to govern itself. This military and political weakness resulted in more authority being given to the Rajas, whom had previously been considered Mughal vassals. Infighting and open warfare between smaller kingdoms soon erupted within the Mughal territories.

One of the now empowered rajas was Jai Singh Kachwaha II of Jaipur. Starting in 1721 Jai embarked on a campaign of political and military conquest in northern India. Using his reformed army and political will, he annexed or vassalized many smaller Rajas. In 1727 he founded the Kingdom of Jaipur and soon after adopted a policy of intervention towards the domestic affairs of other Rajas.

In the early 1700s two brothers of the Rathor clan, Abhai Singh and Bakht Singh, dominated Marwar. The two brothers emerged victorious from a civil war in 1726 following their murder of their father, during which conflict they had employed Maratha soldiers against their opponents. These actions estranged them from the Mughal government, which was at the time embroiled in a conflict with the Marathas. In 1739 Bakht Singh, the lord of Nagaur, decided to force concessions from Bikaner, and called for his brother Abhai (then Raja of Marwar and Jodhpur) to assist him.

The Raja of Bikaner appealed to Jai Singh for assistance after the Marwar army besieged his capital. Jai Singh sent a letter to Abhai requesting leniency for Bikaner, a request Abhai sharply refuted. Jaipur then threatened to invade Marwar unless hostilities were ended. Jai Singh also bribed Bakht Singh to sign a separate peace with Jaipur, turning him against his brother. Jai Singh then stationed his army close to Jodhpur and threatened to burn it to the ground unless the siege was lifted. Abhai was forced to relent, and signed a treaty according to which:

1. The state of Marwar would pay 1,00,000 Rupees in gold, 25,000 in Jewels and give 3 Elephants as Nazarana (translatable as "submission", "dowry" or "tribute") to the Mughal Emperor.
2. Marwar would pay 20,00,000 Rupees to Jai Singh as war reparations.
3. The payment would be done in 4 days. Five barons and Raghunath Bhandari were to remain hostages for it.
4. Merta will be handed over to Bhakt Singh.
5. Marwar would not obstruct Jai Singh in his possessions of the Ajmer subah.
6. No prince or baron of Marwar would be allowed to seek private audience with the Mughal emperor without Jai Singh's permission.
7. Marwar would sever foreign relations with the Marathas without the mediation of the Jaipur Raja.
8. Abhai Singh's councilors would be men selected by the Jaipur court.

The harsh terms of the peace treaty angered many of the Rathors, with the Rathor nobility claiming, "Our noses have been cut off by the Kachhawas." Many argued that the heavy tribute and restrictions placed on Marwar effectively made the state a vassal of Jai Singh and Jaipur.

In 1741, Abhai Singh began to gather his forces at Jodhpur in preparation for a war of revenge against Jaipur. Jai Singh detected these movements and marshaled his army, allies, vassals, and every nearby Mughal garrison to invade Marwar. As the Jaipur army advanced, Bakht Singh arrived at Merta, the forward camp for the Rathor and Marwar army. He entered the Raja's durbar, where he was chastised by his fellow Rathors for betraying them. Bhakt accepted his wrongdoing, and promised to lead his personal cavalry contingent against the oncoming Jaipur army. As described in A Comprehensive History of India (1712-1772),

Bhakt singh now found that his selfish plot had kindled a national warfare which threatened the honour of his clan. So he temporarily set aside his personal ambition and saved the honour of the Rathores by conspicuous gallantry.

== Battle ==
Jai Singh and the Jaipur army made camp at Kunchgaon, 11 miles east of Pushkar Lake. Jai positioned a long line of guns in the direction of the Marwar to defend the encampment. The combined army totaled 40,000–100,000 men from Jaipur and the various states allied with Jai Singh. Bakht's army consisted of 1,000 Rathore horsemen under his command. Bakht Singh at first waited for reinforcements. As no reinforcements arrived, Bakht Singh became determined to attack Jai Singh with his small force.

Bakht Singh and his men charged the Jaipur defenses and quickly punched through Jai Singh's gun line. The Rathores rode through the Jaipur army, cutting down thousands of men. The cavalry penetration was so deep that the Rathors burst through the rear of the Jaipur army and began to raid the baggage train. Tents and supplies were burned, and Bakht seized Sitaramji, Jai Singh's personal family idol. The Rathores galloped from one end to the other causing havoc in the large masses of confused men and horses, the Jaipur army fled in panic, and within 4 hours the Rathors held the field. Sir Jadunath Sarkar quotes that - "the battle front was like tigers upon a flock of sheep".

Though he held the field, Bakht's force had been severely depleted, with only 70 horsemen still left alive. Bakht himself was wounded by both a bullet and an arrow. The Mughal contingent of Jai's battered army began firing rockets onto the battlefield, and since Bhakt Singh could not see any enemies on the field and the direction of the artillery was covered by smoke and dust, he signaled a retreat, forcing the withdrawal of the remaining Rathors.

Jai Singh's army lost several thousands of its soldiers in the battle. Historian Jadunath Sarkar states that according to Chahar Gulzar-i-Shujai of Harcharan Das, who was an eye-witness to the battle, exaggerated the casualties with 12,000 of Jai Singh's men killed and another 12,000 wounded.

The Mughal Emperor had sent 10,000 men with three of his generals to help Jai Singh in keeping the Marathas in check, however the battle caused great panic amongst the Mughal troops leading to a mass desertion. After the battle the Mughal generals were left with just a hundred men.

== Aftermath ==
The Jaipur army held the field after the battle at Gangwana, but had been severely demoralized by the attack. "Even Jaipur bards, could not refrain from awarding the meed of valour to their foes". Jai Singh had no choice but to retreat. One month later (8 July) both sides exchanged captured war loot with each other. The Maharana of Udaipur mediated a peace between Marwar and Jaipur later that year. Gangwana was the last battle fought by Jai Singh, as he could never recover from the shock he received from the outcome of the war and died two years later.

== Bibliography ==
- Sarkar, Jadunath (1992). Fall of the Mughal Empire: 1789–1803. Orient Longman. ISBN 0-86131-749-1.
- Sarkar, Jadunath (1994). A History of Jaipur 1503–1938. Orient Longman. ISBN 81-250-0333-9.
- Gupta, R. K.; Bakshi, S. R. (2008). Rajasthan Through the Ages: Jaipur Rulers and Administration. Vol. IV. Sarup & Sons. ISBN 978-8-17-625841-8.
