= Jhilai =

Village in Rajasthan, India

Coordinates: 26°21′24″N 76°00′23″E

Jhilai or Jhilay is a small village and gram panchayat in Niwai panchayat samiti (block) in the district of Tonk, Rajasthan, India.

Jhilai was formerly the seat of a Rajput principality. The former palace is known for its distinctive artistic style, closely related to that of Jaipur. There is a separate fort, now ruined but still a significant landmark, sited on a rocky outcrop 40–60 metres high.

Jhilai is near Niwai which is a vegetable oil hub. Near Niwai is the Banasthali Vidyapith university.
