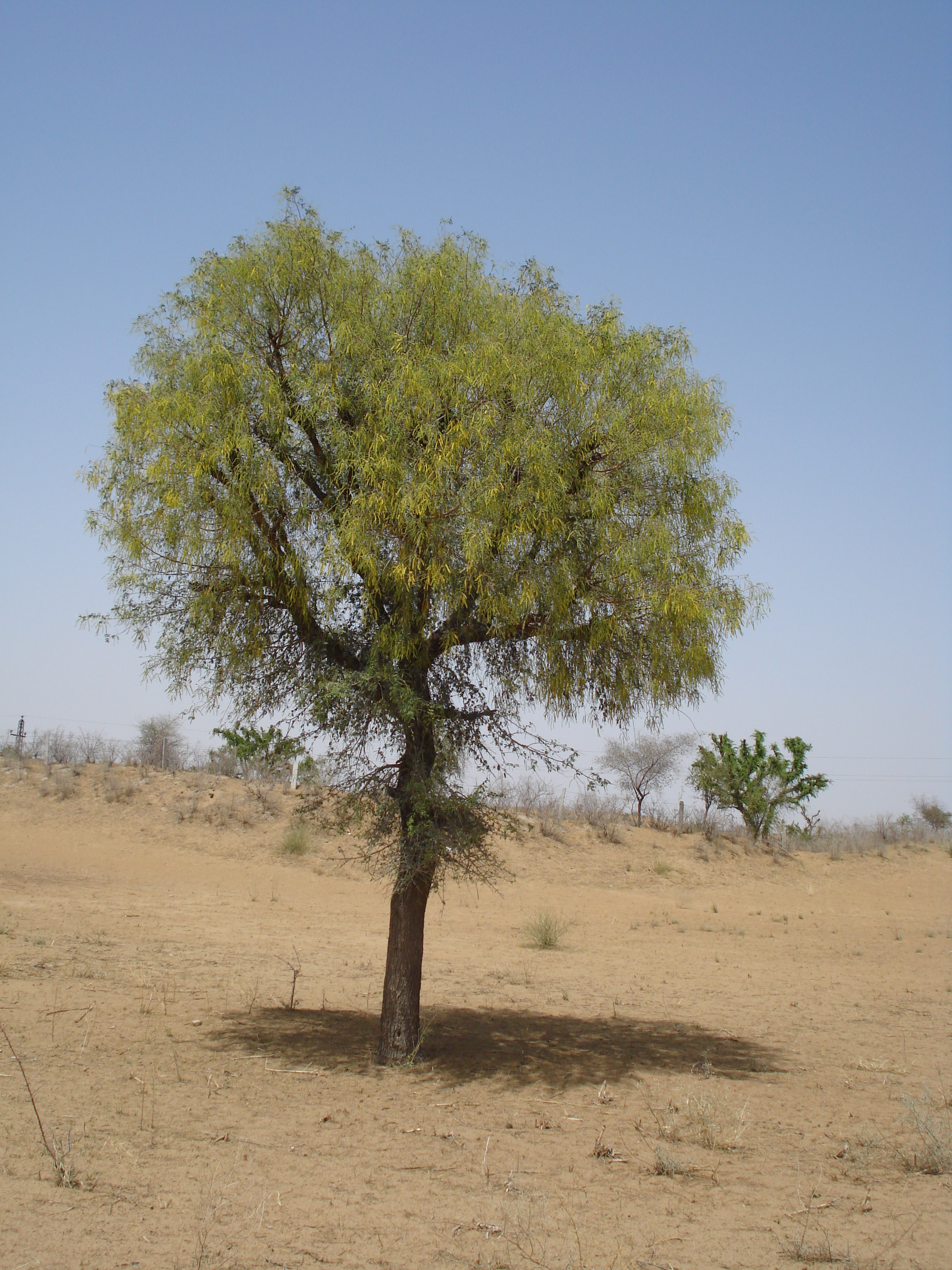

Scientific classification
- Kingdom: Plantae
- Clade: Tracheophytes
- Clade: Angiosperms
- Clade: Eudicots
- Clade: Rosids
- Order: Fabales
- Family: Fabaceae
- Subfamily: Caesalpinioideae
- Clade: Mimosoid clade
- Genus: Prosopis
- Species: P. cineraria

Binomial name
- Prosopis cineraria (L.) Druce

Synonyms
- Adenanthera aculeata Roxb. Mimosa cineraria L. Prosopis spicigera L. Prosopis spicata Burm.

= Prosopis cineraria =

Species of legume

Prosopis cineraria, also known as Persian mesquite or ghaf, chaunkro (Braj Bhakha : चौंक्रो) , jand (Hindustani/Kauravi, Punjabi: जंड/ਜੰਡ) or khejri (Rajasthani: खेजड़ी), is a species of flowering tree in the pea family, Fabaceae. It is native to arid portions of Western Asia and the Indian subcontinent, including Afghanistan, Bahrain, Iran, India, Oman, Pakistan, Saudi Arabia, the United Arab Emirates, and Yemen. Its leaves are bipinnate. It can survive extreme drought. It is an established introduced species in parts of Southeast Asia, including Indonesia.

The ghaf is the national tree of the United Arab Emirates. Through the Give a Ghaf campaign its citizens are urged to plant it in their gardens to combat desertification and preserve their country's heritage. The desert village of Nazwa in the UAE is home to the Al Ghaf Conservation Reserve.

Prosopis cineraria is also the state tree of Rajasthan (where it is known as khejri), and Telangana (where it is known as jammi) in India. A large and well-known example of the species is the Tree of Life in Bahrain; it is approximately 400 years old and growing in a desert devoid of any obvious sources of water.

In 1730 AD, the village of Khejarli near Jodhpur in Rajasthan was the scene of a violent environmental confrontation. Amrita Devi and her three young daughters gave their lives in an attempt to protect some khejri trees which Maharaja Abhai Singh of Marwar had ordered cut to make way for his new palace. This led to widespread defiance in which 363 people were killed trying to save the trees. In the 1970s, the memory of this sacrifice led to the start of the Chipko movement in India.

== Description ==
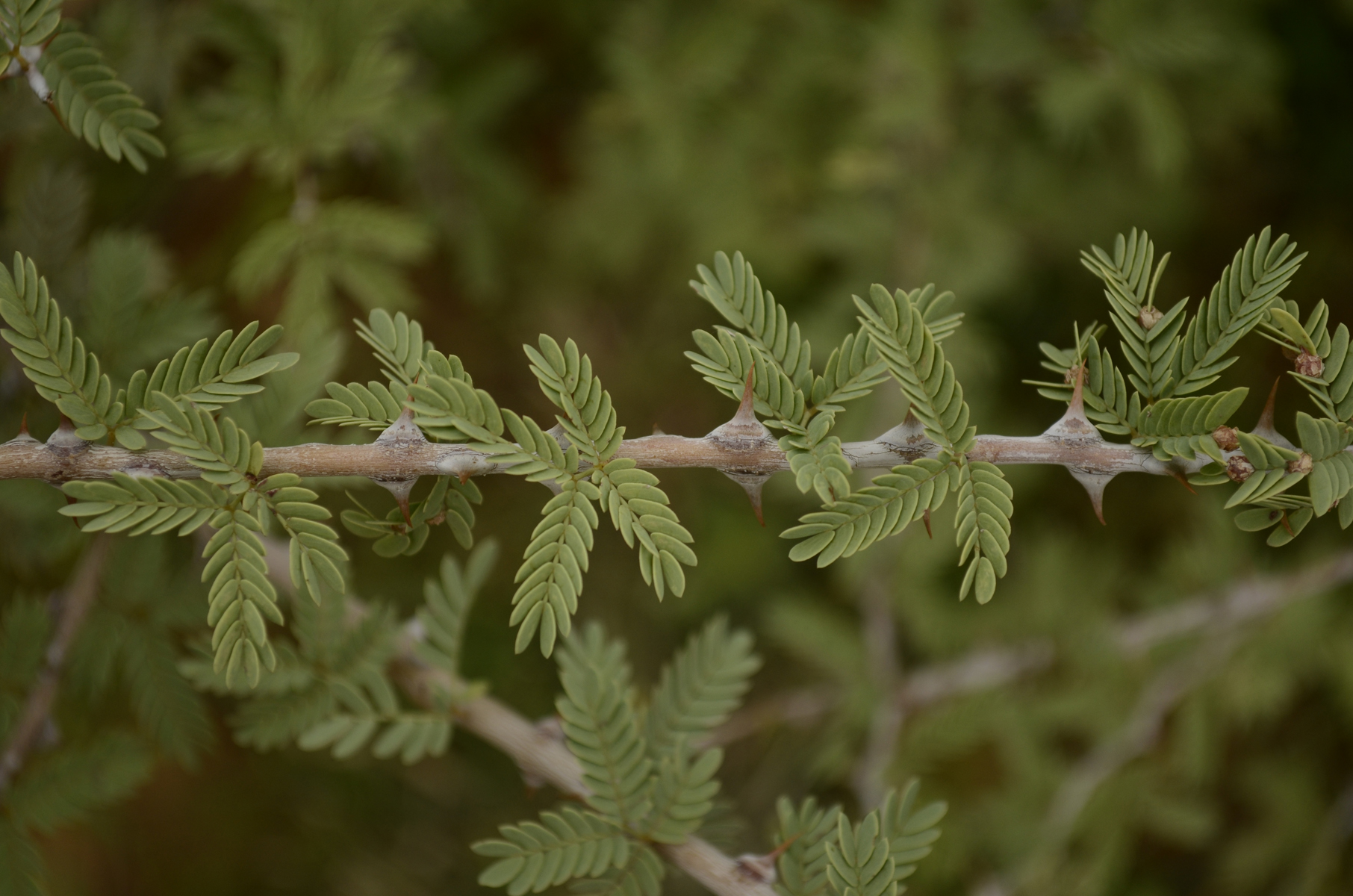
Branch

P. cineraria is a small tree, ranging in height from 3–5 m (9.8–16.4 ft). The leaves are bipinnate, with seven to fourteen leaflets on each of one to three pinnae. Branches are thorned along the internodes. Flowers are small and creamy-yellow and followed by seeds in pods. The tree is found in extremely arid conditions, with rainfall as low as 15 cm (5.9 in) annually; but is indicative of the presence of a deep water table. As with some other Prosopis spp., P. cineraria has demonstrated a tolerance of highly alkaline and saline environments.

The tree should not be confused with the similar-looking Chinese lantern tree, Dichrostachys cinerea. They can be told apart by the flowers. While the Chinese lantern tree has bicolored pink-yellow flowers, the true Shami tree has yellow-colored bristled flowers only, like most other mesquites.

== Religious significance ==
This tree is highly revered among Hindus and worshipped as part of Dusshera festival. This tree takes importance during the tenth day of the Dasara Festival when it is celebrated in various parts of India. Historically, among the Rajputs, the ranas – who were the high priest and the king – used to conduct the worship and then to liberate a jay (the sacred bird of Lord Rama). In the Deccan, as part of the tenth-day ritual of Dussahera, the Marathas used to shoot arrows onto the crown of the tree and gather the falling leaves into their turbans.

The tree is known by different names across the western and northern regions of India, e.g. shami in Madhya Pradesh, Maharastra & Uttar Pradesh, chaunkro in Braj, jammi in Telangana & Andhra Pradesh, khijro in Gujarat, khejri in Rajasthan, janti in Haryana, and jand in the Punjab and Kauravi-speaking region.

In Karnataka, Acacia ferruginea has also been locally referred to as Banni mara instead of the accepted Khejri tree, and accepted as the tree where the Pandavas hid their weapons during exile. There are also some unconfirmed references which consider Acacia ferruginea as the tree which is revered and worshipped on Vijay Dashami day. However, according to historical references, Prosopis cineraria is known as the Banni mara, and holds a special place in the Mysore Dasara, where its worshipped on the Vijay-dashami day.

In the Mahabharata, the Pandavas spent their thirteenth year of exile in disguise in the kingdom of Virata. Before going to Virata, they hung their celestial weapons in this tree for safekeeping for a year. When they returned after a year, they found their weapons safe in the branches of the Shami tree. Before taking the weapons, they worshipped the tree and thanked it for keeping their weapons safe.

== Culinary uses ==
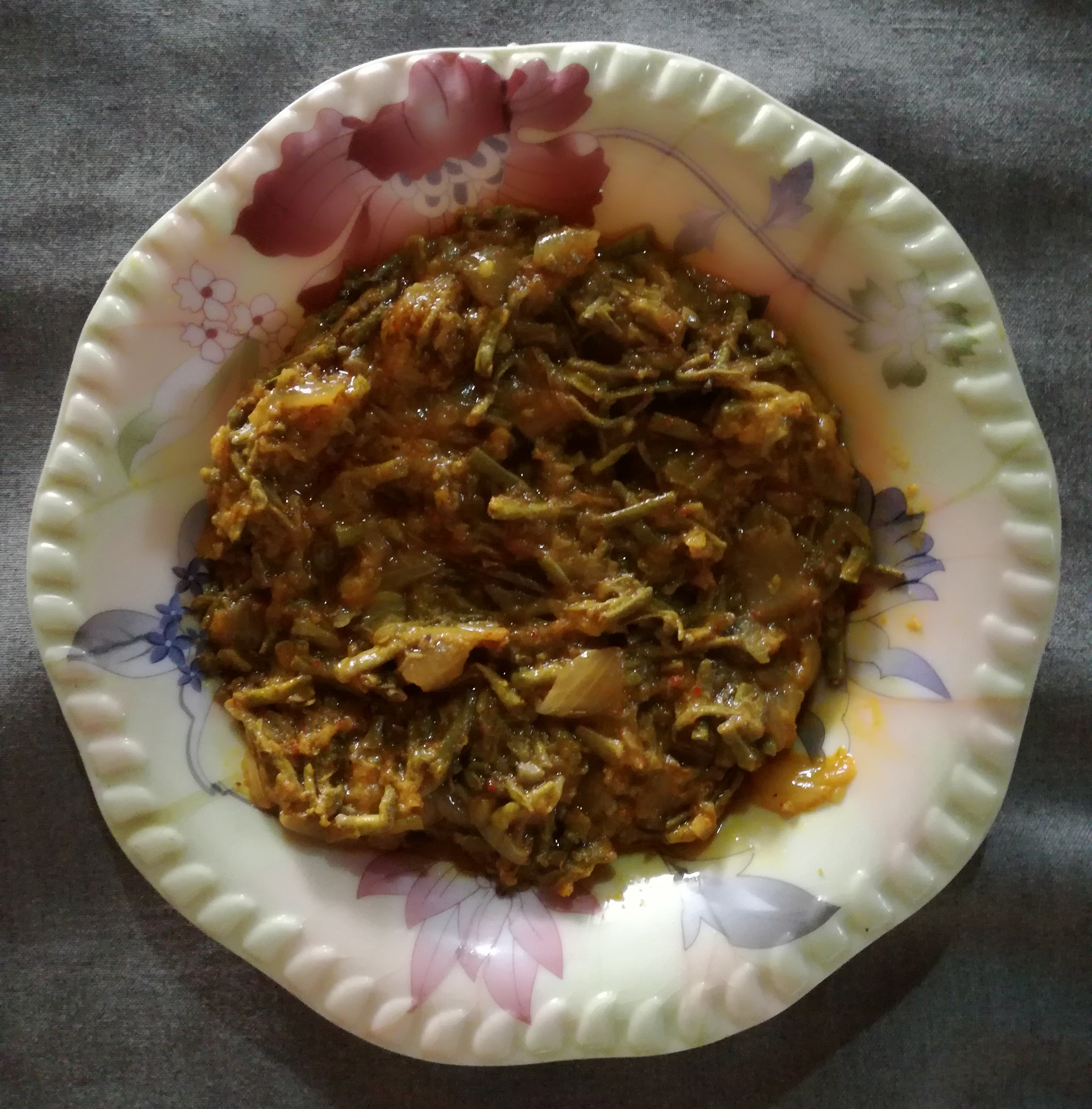
Singhrian ji Bhaaji prepared in Tharparkar, Sindh

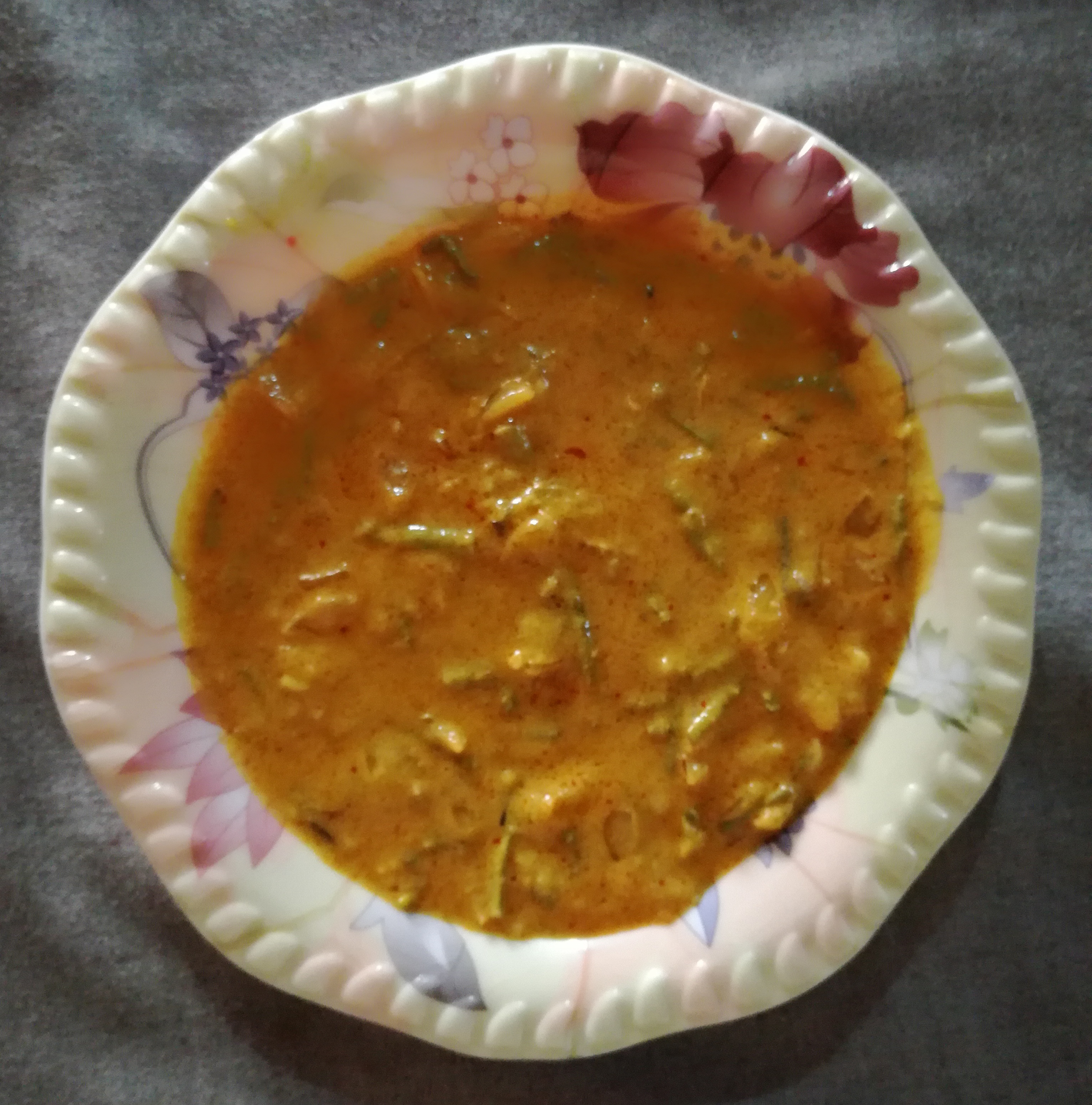
Popular Thari dish Singhrian jo Raabro (Khaatiyo)

In Thar Desert the singhri or sangri pods growing on Prosopis cineraria are used in various types of bhaaji and kadhi. Singhri is one of the traditional cuisines of the Thar Desert.

== Medical use ==
Extract from unripe fruit pods of the plant was shown to ameliorate artificially-induced damage to testes in an animal model. Leaves of this tree can ameliorate mouth ulcers. Chewing its leaves for a few minutes, so releasing the juice of the leaves in the mouth can relieve the ulcers. The swelling comes down significantly. The juice is then spat out, rather than swallowed.
