= Amrita Devi =

18th-century Indian environmentalist and martyr

- Born: 1700-1702
- Died: 11 September 1730 (aged 28-30)
- Known for: environmental martyr Khejarli massacre

Amrita Devi, known as Amrita Devi Bishnoi was an environmentalist from the Bishnoi community who sacrificed her life in 1730 to protect Khejri trees. Her bravery in the Khejarli massacre became the ultimate symbol of nature conservation and inspired modern movements like the Chipko Movement.

== Khejarli massacre ==
The Khejarli massacre was an event in 1730 in Rajasthan where 363 Bishnoi people were killed while peacefully protecting Khejri trees. Led by Amrita Devi Bishnoi, the villagers hugged the trees to prevent them from being felled by the soldiers of Maharaja Abhai Singh of Marwar.

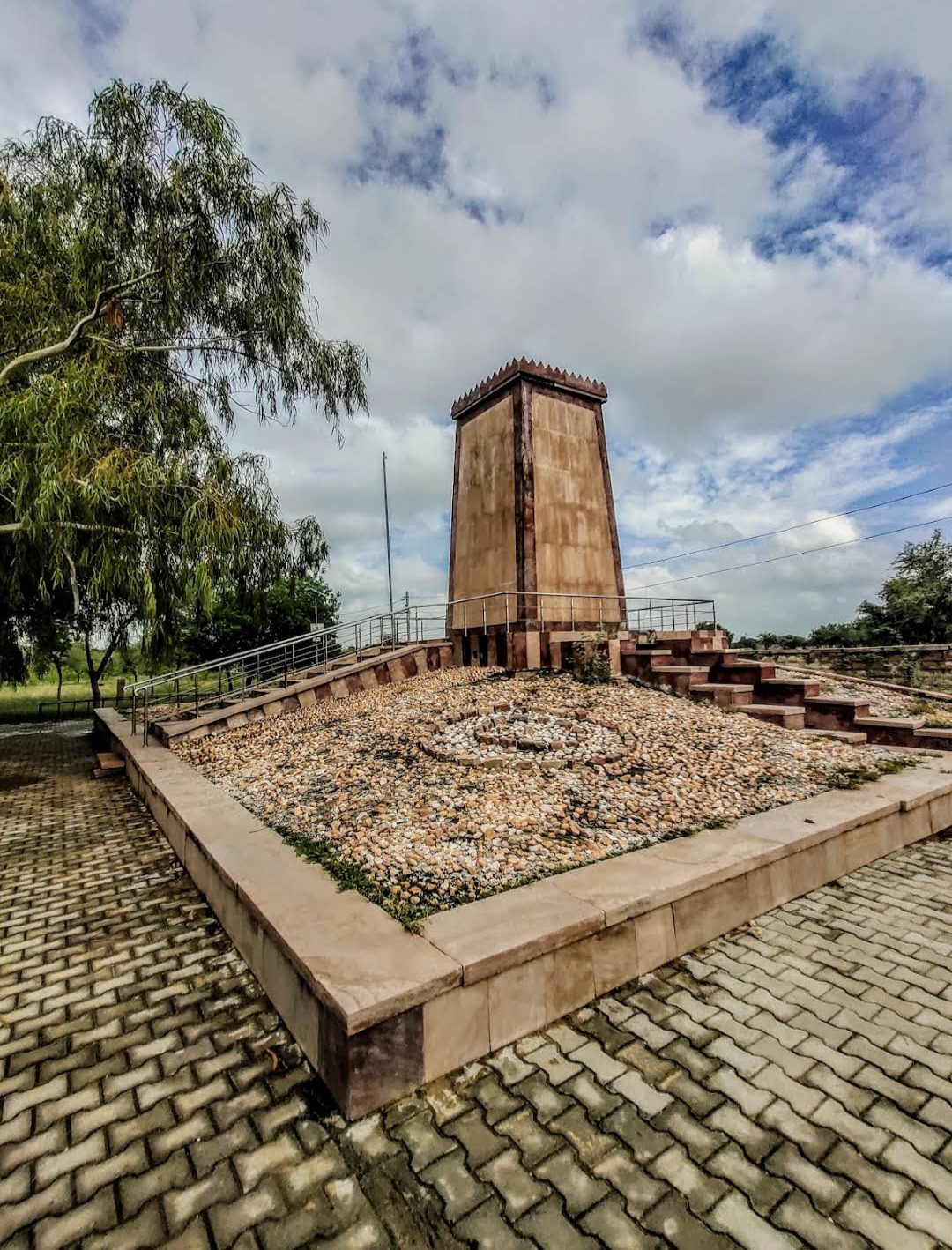
A memorial Commemorating 363 Bishnois died for saving Green Trees.

== Legacy and honours ==
The Amrita Devi Bishnoi National Award was established by the Government of India. The award honours individuals or communities for significant contributions to wildlife protection.
