= Akheraj Rajpurohit =

Rajpurohit of Marwar (1675 - 1720)

Patshah Akheraj Singh Rajpurohit
- Born: c. 1658 Tinwari, Jodhpur
- Died: March 1725
- Allegiance: Kingdom of Marwar
- Children: Surajmal, Kesari Singh Rajpurohit, Jaisingh, Mahasingh

Akheraj Singh Rajpurohit or Patshah Akheraj ji was the Rajguru and Sardar in the royal court of Marwar during the reign of Maharaja Jaswant Singh and Maharaja Ajit Singh.

== Background ==
Akheraj Singh sevad was the thakur of Tinwari thikana. He was the member and leader of the Royal Council of Marwar. The Maharaja of Jodhpur granted jagir of Khedapa, Bhainser Khutri, Bhainser Kotwali, Tinwari, Khinchan, Jatiyawas. Akheraj Singh was a solitaire politician of that time. He was the son of Thakur Dalpatsingh of Tinwari, who got martyred in the Battle of Dharmat(1658), at the age of 22. He was one of the trusted aides of Maharaja Jaswant Singh and Ajit Singh. Along with Durgadas Rathore, he was fighting against Aurangzeb for the kingdom of Marwar and protecting young Ajit Singh. He was brought up by Jaswant Singh of Marwar with all royal customs and manners, as he was yet to be born before his father died in the Battle of Dharmat(1658).

== Legacy ==
After death of Maharaja Jaswant Singh, Emperor Aurangzeb wanted to usurp the Jodhpur. At that time Akheraj was serving the chief of the security council of Mehrangarh fort. Badshah sent his trusted sardars to Jodhpur. Badshah gave the mansab of jodhpur to Inder Singh, son of Rao AmarSingh of Nagaur. Inder Singh wanted to vacate the fort of Mehrangarh but he did not get success. So he sent a battalion to Tinwari pargana to take revenge. Akheraj's brother Nagraj Singh died in the battle of Tinwari. During this crisis in Jodhpur, Durgadas Rathore succeeded in getting kunwar Ajit Singh out ofJodhpur safely and kunwar was kept undercover in Deori village of Sirohi. Later Akheraj singh took him to kalindri. Mukundadas Khinchi kept guarding him in the guise of a monk. Akheraj stayed with kunwar Ajit Singh during his days of struggle and offered his services along with Durgadas.

When kunwar Ajit Singh became the ruler of Marwar, he gave jagirs to all his associates. Akheraj got Tinwari, Khinchan, Jatiyawas, Khedapa again. Maharaja gave more than 650 villages to Akheraj ji but with all humility and modesty, selfless Akheraj ji insisted on transferring the Jagirs to his fellow Rajpurohit brothers and even requested to grant new Jagirs to the ones deprived of any. Maharaja gave him titles of "Anvi Akheraj" and "Patshah Akheraj". In his honour a subclan named 'Akherajot Sevad' was started in the Sevad clan of Rajpurohits, whose descendants are generally known as 'Akherajots of Tinwari'.

Akheraj has a heroic figure among the folk of marwar. Many folks' songs are sung in his memory even today. A couplet is famous in the folklore:

बण-बण भटकियाँ भांखरा, अज संग अखेराज

प्रोहिता रा पातशाह, राखण कामधा राज ||
