= Jaswant Singh of Marwar =

Maharaja of Marwar from 1638 to 1678

Raja Jaswant Singh I
- Maharaja of Marwar
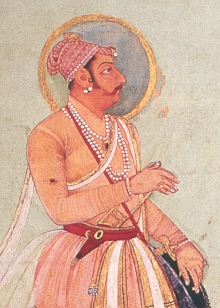
- Jaswant Singh Rathore of Marwar

Maharaja of Marwar
- Reign: 6 May 1638 – 28 December 1678
- Coronation: 25 May 1638
- Predecessor: Gaj Singh
- Successor: Ajit Singh

Subahdar of Gujarat
- Emperor: Aurangzeb
- Term: 1659–1662
- Predecessor: Mirza Badi-uz-Zaman Safavi
- Successor: Mahabat Khan II
- Term: 1670–1672
- Predecessor: Bahadur Khan
- Successor: Muhammad Amin Khan Turani
- Born: 26 December 1626; Burhanpur, Deccan
- Died: 28 December 1678 (aged 52); Jamrud, Khyber Pass
- Spouses: Bhatiyaniji Ram Kanwarji of Jaisalmer; Maharani Hadi Jasvant Deviji; and others
- Issue: Ajit Singh; Others (who did not survive to maturity)
- House: Rathore
- Father: Maharaja Gaj Singh
- Mother: Sisodiniji Pratap Deiji; – daughter of Rawat Bhan Singh and granddaughter of Maharaj Shakti Singh of Mewar
- Religion: Hinduism

Raja Jaswant Singh I (26 December 1626 – c. 28 December 1678) (Note: Jaswant Singh's date of death is either 28 November or 28 December 1678, with sources differing.) was the Rathore ruler of the Kingdom of Marwar in the western part of Rajputana (modern-day Rajasthan, India). He was a distinguished man of letters and author of noted literary works like Siddhant-Bodh, Anand Vilas and Bhasha-Bhushan.

== Early life ==
Born on 26 December 1626 at Burhanpur, Jaswant Singh was the youngest son of Maharaja Gaj Singh of Marwar. His mother, Sisodini Pratap Deviji, was the favorite wife of his father and was the daughter of Bhan Sisodia, eldest son of Shakti Singh Sisodia.

== Reign ==
Jaswant Singh succeeded his father on his death by special decree of the Emperor Shah Jahan, in accordance with his father's wishes, on 6 May 1638. He was invested by Imperial authority and inherited the parganas of Jodhpur, Siwana, Merta, Sojat, Phalodi and Pokharan (Satalmer) in jagir.

He was installed on the gaddi at Sringar Chowki, Mehrangarh, Jodhpur, on 25 May 1638. He was granted the personal title of Maharaja by the Emperor Shah Jahan, on 6 January 1654.

Jaswant Singh's ascension to the throne had an instrumental role of his father's favourite concubine, Anara Begum, who used to regard Jaswant as her own son and also had differences with the heir-apparent Amar Singh Rathore, who was later granted the territory of Nagore as compensation.

== Battle of Dharmat ==
Jaswant Singh was appointed by Shah Jahan to stop the advance of the rebel prince Aurangzeb and prince Murad. Army of Jaswant Singh and combined army of both the princes met at Dharmatpur, fifteen miles from Ujjain. The battle was fought on 15 April 1658. Jaswant Singh's advisers suggested a night raid to destroy Aurangzeb's artillery and gunpowder as the Rajput army was almost entirely made up of light cavalry, while Aurangzeb had a well equipped army of heavy cavalry, Artillery and Muskets. However Jaswant Singh replied by saying "It is inconsistent with the manliness of the Rajputs or usage, to employ stratagems or make a night attack". Jaswant Singh was defeated and lost 6,000 of his soldiers including his Rajpurohit Dalpat Singh sevad(father of Akheraj Singh) of Tinwari, who was just 22 years old. Ratan Singh Rathore, Maharaja of Ratlam and Mokand Das Hada, Rao of Kota were amongst others slain in the battle.

== Deccan campaign ==
Jaswant Singh was posted to the Deccan and made Pune his headquarters. In 1660, he encamped across from Shaista Khan’s camp after Pune was seized. In 1664, he besieged Kondana, but it ended in a failure. He left for Delhi after Jai Singh was posted to the Deccan.

In 1667, He returned to the Deccan with Prince Muazzam, who was made viceroy following Jai Singh’s departure to the north . He also acted as an intermediary between Shivaji and Emperor Aurangzeb after Aurangzeb ignored Shivaji’s letters of submission.

In 1670, Jaswant Singh’s and Prince Muazzam’s poor opinion of Diler Khan and his consequent paranoia led him to flee to Gujarat, seeking protection from the emperor.

In the same year, Aurangzeb appointed Mahabat Khan to Burhanpur, where Jaswant Singh was posted, as the supreme commander in the Deccan following Shivaji’s sack of Surat.

== Death and succession ==
Prithviraj Singh was Jaswant Singh's son. It is chronicled in Marwar 'khyats' that Aurangzeb presented Prithviraj Singh a dress which was poisoned. On wearing the dress Prithviraj died on 8 May 1667 in great pain at Delhi. Prithviraj was a good leader and a brave prince. Jaswant could not get over the shock of his son's death. He was very saddened because he had no male heir who could seek revenge.

Jaswant's reign lasted until his death at Jamrud, near Peshawar, on the Vikram Samvat calendar date of 10 Pausha of 1735, equivalent to 28 December 1678 on the Gregorian calendar. However, another scholar lists 10 Pausha 1735 V.S. as having been on 28 November 1678.

At the time of his death two of his wives were pregnant, and both would later bear sons. This led to a war in which there were attempts to install Jaswant Singh's elder surviving son Ajit Singh Rathore as ruler of Marwar.

== In popular culture ==
=== Films and television ===
- In the 2011-2012 Indian historical TV serial Veer Shivaji, he is portrayed by Romanch Mehta.

== Ancestry ==
Ancestors of Jaswant Singh of Marwar

8. Udai Singh, Raja of Marwar
4. Sur Singh, Raja of Marwar
9. Manrang Devi
2. Gaj Singh, Raja of Marwar
10. Kachwaha Durjan Sal of Amarsar
5. Sobhag Devi
1. Jaswant Singh
11. Shakti Singh, Maharaj of Bohera
6. Bhan Sisodia, Maharaj of Bohera
12. Harkunwar Parmar
3. Pratap Devi
13. Keso das of Merta
7. A daughter

== Gallery ==
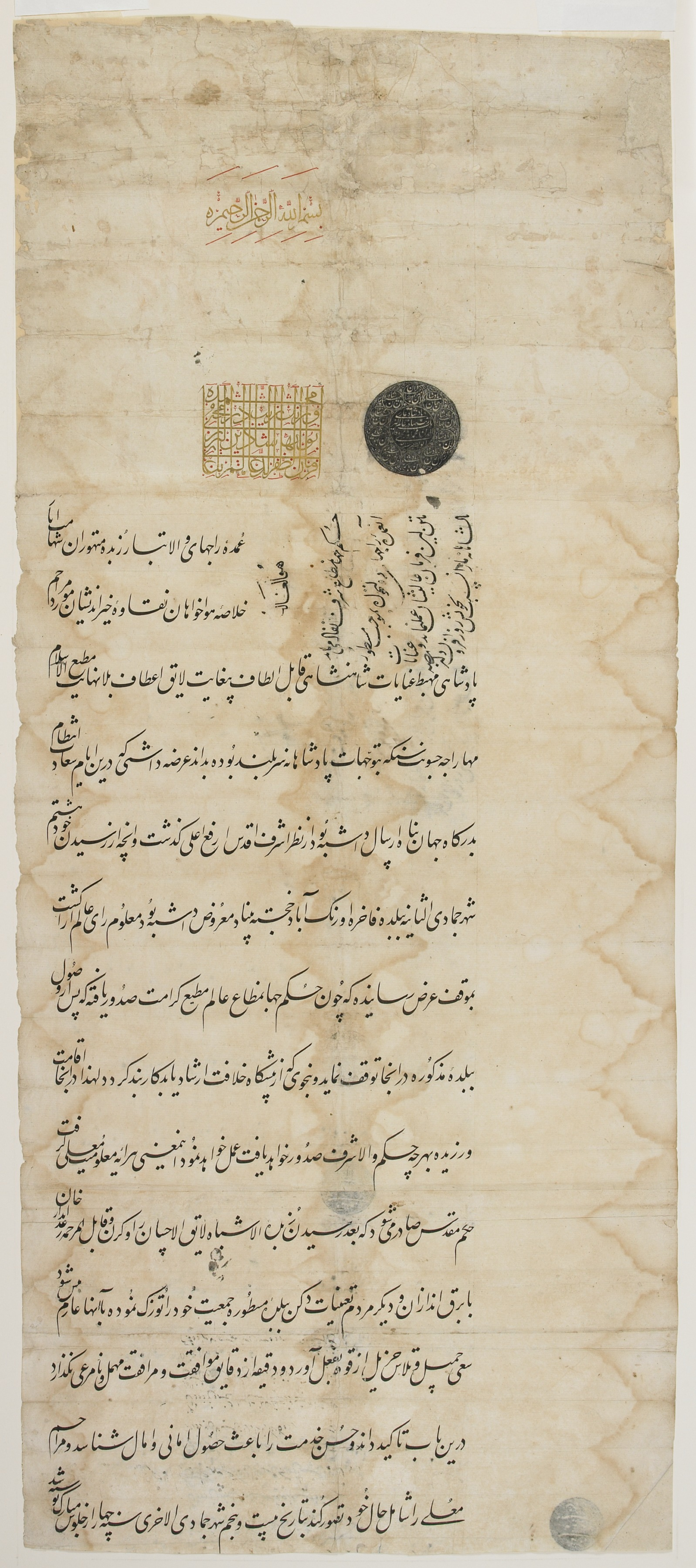
Farman (royal decree) of Mughal emperor Aurangzeb issued 15 February 1662, conveying an order to Jaswant Singh. Arthur M. Sackler Gallery

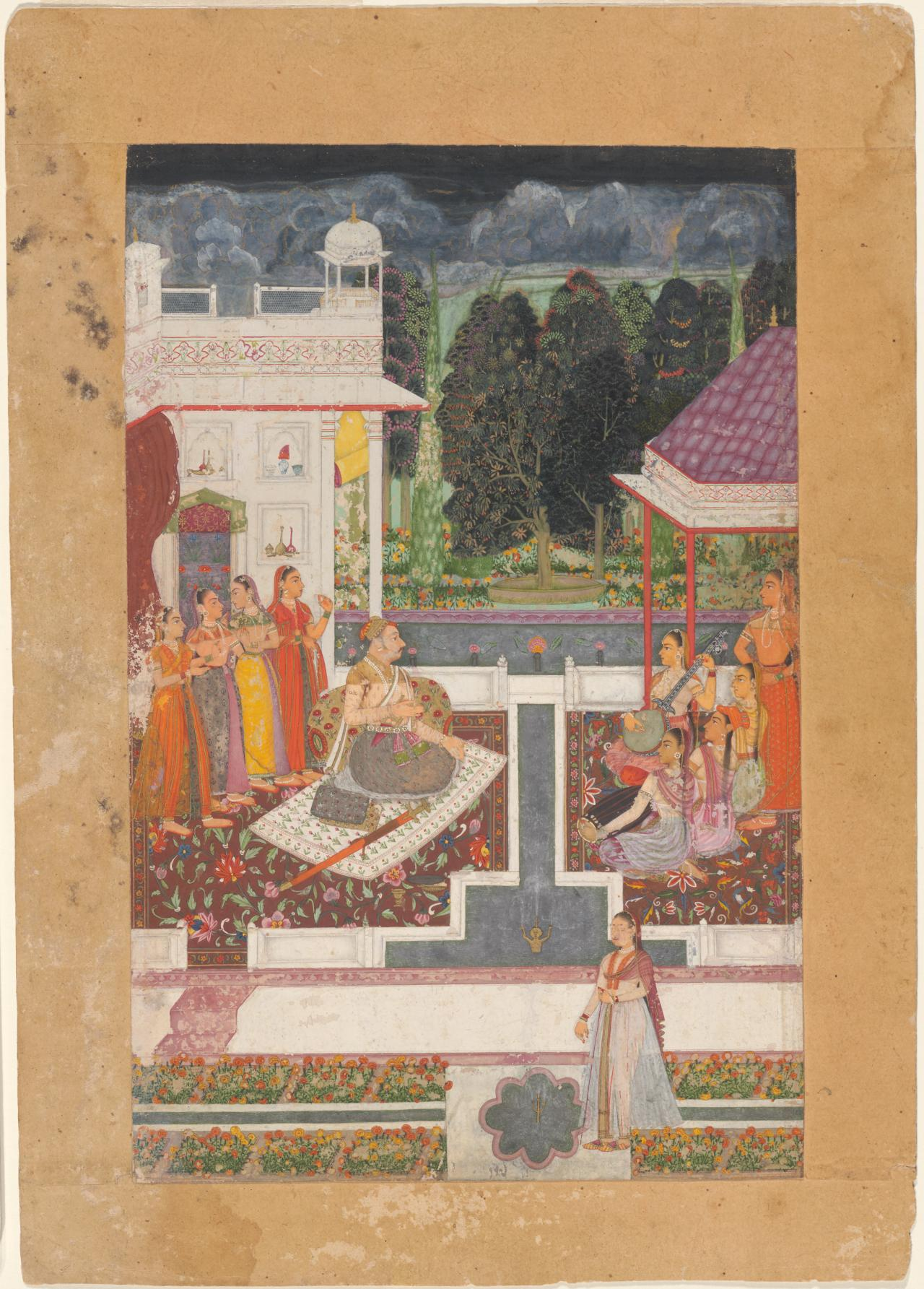
Maharaja Jaswant Singh of Jodhpur listening to music. Jodhpur, c. 1660. National Gallery of Victoria

== See also ==
- Rulers of Marwar
- List of Rajputs

== Notes ==
Preceded by Gaj Singh	Maharaja of the Marwar; 6 May 1638 – 28 December 1678	Succeeded by Ajit Singh
