= Bakht Singh of Marwar =

Maharaja of Marwar from 1751 to 1752

Bakht Singh Rathore
- Maharaja of Marwar
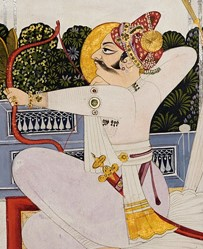
- Jodhpur style painting depicting Bhakt Singh practicing archery, circa 1750

Ruler of Marwar
- Tenure: July 1751 – 21 September 1752
- Coronation: 8 July 1751
- Predecessor: Ram Singh
- Successor: Vijay Singh
- Born: 16 August 1706; Meherangarh, Jodhpur
- Died: 21 September 1752 (aged 46); Sindholi
- House: Rathore
- Father: Ajit Singh Rathore
- Religion: Hinduism

Bakht Singh (16 August 1706 – 21 September 1752), also known as Bakhat Singh, was an 18th-century Indian Raja of the Rathore Clan. Born in 1706, he ruled over various domains in the Jodhpur and Marwar states and was a major political force during his life.

== Early life and political ascension ==
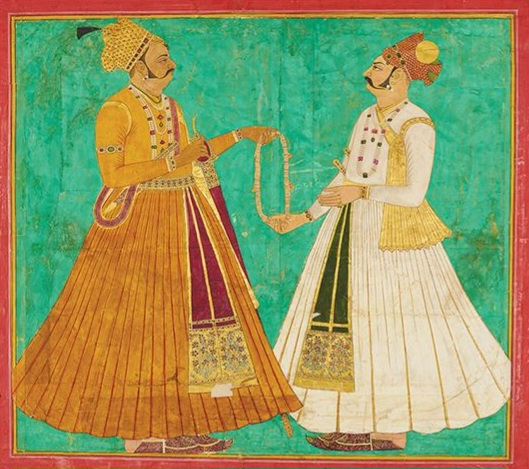
Maharaja Ajit Singh presenting a garland to his son Bakht Singh. c.1751-1752.

Bakht Singh was born on 16 August 1706 as the second son of Ajit Singh, ruler of Marwar. At the time of Bakht's birth, his family was in open revolt against the Mughal Empire due to an ongoing territorial dispute over Gujarat. His father was pardoned by Muhammad Azam Shah in 1708, granting the Rathore clan control over the Kingdom of Marwar and the city of Jodhpur.

Bakht Singh had a tall and strong built and was popular amongst the ladies of the Empire. Amongst his admirers was the Empress of the Mughal Empire, who according to the chronicles wanted her husband (Ahmad Shah Bahadur) to follow Bakht's diet. In 1724, Bakht Singh and his elder brother Abhai Singh plotted to kill their father and usurp his position as Raja. They succeeded, and Abhai Singh became the Maharaja of the Kingdom of Marwar and Jodhpur. This abrupt change of leadership sparked a brief civil war among the Rathore in Marwar, during which the brothers employed Maratha soldiers to fight their enemies. At this time Marwar was a vassal of the Mughal Empire, which was in constant conflict with the Maratha Empire. The allowing of Maratha soldiers onto Mughal territory to solve a domestic dispute effectively estranged the Rathores from the Mughal government.

=== Siege of Ahmedabad ===
In 1730 a taxation depute against Sarbuland Khan (Nawab of Gujarat) resulted in Abhai Singh laying siege to the city of Ahmedabad. Bakht Singh personally led the storming of the city, the Marwar army lost 120 soldiers and 700 were injured while Sarbuland Khan lost his son in the cannonade and most of his men were slaughtered along with high ranking Mughal Mansabdars (nobles), some ranking as high as 3,000. Sarbuland Khan surrendered after three days of fighting, after which the Mughal emperor was forced to make Abhai Singh the lord of Ahmedabad and the governor of Gujarat. Bakht Singh was commended for his bravery during the battle.

== Lordship ==
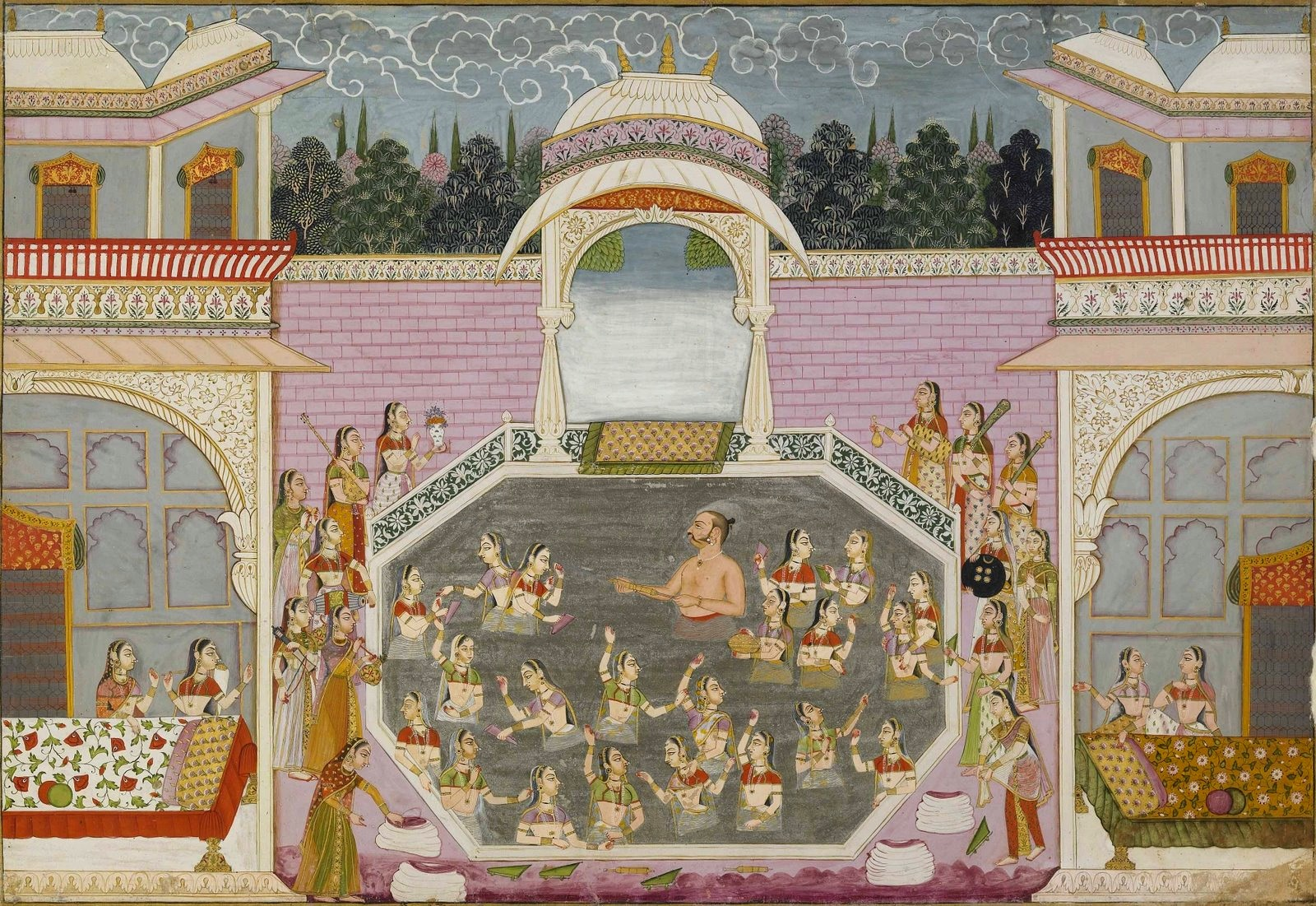
Bakhat Singh rejoices during Holi, Nagaur c. 1748–50; 44.1 x 65.1 cm. Mehrangarh Museum Trust

By 1739, Bakht Singh had been appointed lord of Nagaur. Seeking to expand his influence, he attempted to force concessions from the Bikaner State, calling on his brother for support. The Raja of Bikaner sent a letter to Jai Singh II, the powerful Maharaja of the Kingdom of Jaipur, requesting assistance. Jai Singh sent a letter to Abhai Singh asking for leniency to be shown to Bikaner, a request Abhai sharply refuted. Seeking to end the conflict, Jai Singh dispatched his minister Vidyadhar to Bakht Singh. Bakht agreed to withdraw his men from the conflict if he were paid by Jaipur and given the town of Merta. This was done, and with Bakht Singh now removed as a threat, Jai Singh was able to force Abhai to make peace. Unable to face Jaipur alone, Abhai Singh was forced to sign a treaty with Jai Singh. The Kingdom of Marwar was forced to pay 1 lakh (100000) rupees to the Mughals, 20 lakh (2000000) to Jaipur, give up hostages, and was prohibited from sending emissaries to the Mughal court without the express approval of Jai Singh. The latter condition effectively made Marwar a vassal of Jaipur, as Abhai could no longer request aid from the Mughal government. The treaty enraged many members of the Rathore clan, most of whom felt that Bakht Singh was responsible for the disaster.

=== Battle of Gangwana ===
In 1741, Abhai Singh began to gather his forces in Jodhpur in preparation for a war of revenge against Jaipur. Jai Singh detected these movements and gathered his army (of 40000-100000 men) to invade Marwar. As the Jaipur army advanced, Bakht Singh arrived at Merta, the forward camp for the Rathore and Marwar army. He entered the Raja's durbar, where he was chastised by his fellow Rathors for his betrayal. Bhakt accepted his wrongdoing, and promised to lead his personal cavalry contingent (of 1000 men) against the oncoming Jaipur.

In the ensuing Battle of Gangwana Bakht Singh and his cavalry of 1000 soldiers succeeded in inflicting heavy casualties on the Jaipur army. Over 12,000 Rajputs and Mughals were killed, losses so high that Jai Singh ended the campaign and was forced to accept a mediated peace with Abhai Singh. Bakht Singh, wounded by both a bullet and an arrow during the fighting, was once again praised for his valor. Jai Singh never recovered from shock suffered from losses of this battle and died 2 years later.

== Later life ==
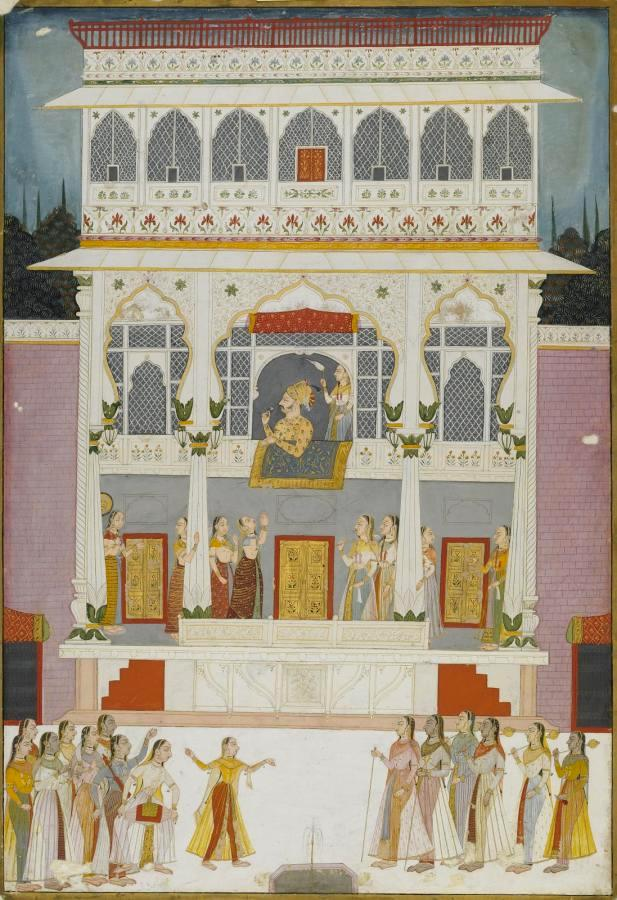
Maharaja Bakht Singh at the Jharokha window of the Bakhat Singh Mahal, Nagaur

On 29 June 1741, Bakht Singh was offered Gujarat by the Mughal Emperor. The Mughals hoped that Bakht Singh could become its governor and counter the rising power of the Marathas. Before accepting, Singh sent his spies to Gujarat and upon learning of the hopeless situation, declined the offer.

On 17 June 1749, Abhai Singh died, with his eldest son Ram Singh succeeding him. Bakht Singh (his uncle) disagreed with this primogeniture and rose up in revolt. Bakht Singh emerged triumphant in the battle of Luniawas, becoming the Maharaja of Marwar and Jodhpur in July 1751. Bakht Singh's first step as a ruler was to raise an army in Ajmer and to start fortifying his holdings to protect Marwar from external threats like the Mughals, Marathas and Afghans. In May 1752 Jayapa Sindhia and Ram Singh attacked Ajmer, sacked it and massacred the populace. Upon learning of the invasion, Bakht Singh marched with his army and camped 8 miles away from Ajmer. He waited till July and then attacked Jayapa. Bakht Singh blocked the surrounding paths and placed his guns on a hill, he then bombarded the Marathas, upon receiving heavy casualties, the Marathas fled along with the army of Ram Singh. Bakht Singh died a sudden death on 21 September 1752. According to Persian historians, he died by cholera while Vir Vinod claims that he was poisoned by Madho Singh I. His son Vijay Singh inherited his titles. The Rathore civil war between Vijay Singh and Ram Singh that would follow after Bakht Singh's death ultimately led to the downfall of the Rathore clan.

== See also ==
- Rulers of Marwar

== Bibliography ==
- R.K Gupta, S.R Bakshi (2008). Rajasthan Through the Ages, Vol 4, Jaipur Rulers and Administration. Sarup & Sons. ISBN 9788176258418.
- Jodhpur and the Later Mughals, AD 1707–1752, by R. S. Sangwan. Published by Pragati Publications, 2006.
- Sir Jadunath Sarkar (1994). A History of Jaipur 1503–1938. Orient Longman. ISBN 81-250-0333-9.
- Faruqui, Munis D. (2012). The Princes of the Mughal Empire, 1504–1719. Cambridge University Press. p. 316. ISBN 978-1-107-02217-1.
- Gazetteer of the Bombay Presidency: Ahmedabad. Google Books 2015 (Public Domain text). 7 January 2015. pp. 248–262. Retrieved 1 February 2015.
- Richards, John F. (1995). The Mughal Empire (Reprinted ed.). Cambridge University Press. pp. 180–181. ISBN 978-0-52156-603-2.
