= Kaviraja Muraridan =

Indian politician, writer and poet (1830–1914)

Mahamahopadhyaya Kaviraja Muraridan

Dewan of Marwar
- Monarch: Maharaja Jaswant Singh II; (1873–1895)

Hakim of Jodhpur; Hakim of Pachpadra
- Monarch: Maharaja Takht Singh; (1843–1873)

Judge of the Appellate Court; Officer of the Civil Court
- Monarch: Maharaja Sardar Singh; (1895–1911)
- Notable works: Yaśavaṃta-Yaśo-Bhūṣaṇa; Tawarikh Marwar; Saradāraprakāśikā

Personal details
- Born: 1830 Bhandiyawas, Kingdom of Marwar
- Died: 1914 (aged 83–84) , Kingdom of Marwar
- Relations: Kaviraja Bankidas (grandfather)
- Children: Kaviraja Ganesh Dan
- Parent: Kaviraja Bharatdan
- Occupation: Politician; Historian; Poet

Mahamahopadhyaya Kaviraja Muraridan Ashiya (1830 — 1914) served as the Dewan (Prime Minister) of Marwar during the reign of Jaswant Singh II (1873–1895). Kaviraja is remembered as an astute politician and a farsighted administrator, who made significant contributions to the history of Marwar. He was a Tazimi sardar (noble) and a renowned scholar, known for his prominent works including Yaśavaṃta-Yaśo-Bhūṣaṇa and Tawarikh Marwar.

== Early life and family ==
Kaviraja Muraridan was born in 1830 into the prominent family of Bhandiyawas. His father, Kaviraja Bharatdan, and grandfather, Kaviraja Bankidas, were renowned scholars-historians and administrators of the kingdom of Marwar.

During his childhood, Muraridan learned bhasha-sahitya and Dingal from his father Bharatdan, Yati Jnanchandra taught him Sanskrit.

== Career ==
At the age of sixteen, Muraridan joined the court of Maharaja Takhat Singh and held various administrative positions under him and later rulers, including Jaswant Singh II and Sardar Singh. By 1870, he had been appointed as the hakim of Jodhpur pargana. He also served as the musahib and hakim of Pachpadra pargana.

Kaviraja Muraridan was well known for his role in the administration of Marwar. He served as a member of the Executive Council and was Head of the Diwani (Civil) and the Faujdari (Criminal) Court. Subsequently, he was appointed as the Judge of the Appellate Court established in April 1882. Additionally, he served as the Magistrate and General Superintendent of the princely state of Marwar.

He also played a leading part in passing a set of laws Morishala (named after him), a type of the doctrine of lapse. According to these laws, the Jagir could not pass, by adoption or otherwise, to a person other than the progeny of the original grantee. Although he faced criticism for this act, it was viewed as a progressive move in terms of maintaining the stability of the jagir system.

In addition to his political career, Kaviraja Muraridan also had an interest in education. He was one of the pioneers of the first school at Jodhpur, Gyananandi Pathshah, which was opened on 1 April 1897, with fifteen pupils. The pioneers of the school also started a Hindi weekly named Marudharmint, which was printed in the lithographic press attached to it.

In 1899, due to a lack of rain, Marwar was ravaged by a severe famine. Sir Pratap left India to participate in the China campaign, leaving the administration in the hands of a special committee consisting of Kaviraja Muraridan and Pandit Sukhdeo Prasad. The committee's most important achievement was the execution of famine relief operations based on modern principles, and the introduction of Imperial currency (1900) in the State.

Kaviraja Muraridan was one of the founding members of Rajputra Hitkarini Sabha and signatory of the meeting held in Ajmer on 10 March 1888, as representative of the Charanas of the Jodhpur State. He also acted as the caste-head for the Charanas of Jodhpur.

== Estate ==
Aside from his ancestral sasan of Bhandiyawas, Kaviraja Muraridan also held the jagir of Luni. In 1894, Kaviraj Muraridan built an exquisite fortified haveli which is now famously known as Fort Chanwa.

During the reign of Jaswant Singh II, besides the revenue from his jagir, he was assigned an annual salary of Rs. 8,400. He continued in service even after the accession of Sardar Singh and was paid a yearly salary of Rs. 7,500.

However, in 1941, his jagir of Luni lapsed back to the state as due to the absence of a direct heir, a result of the Morishala laws that he passed.

=== Honours ===
Kaviraja Muraridan was presented with lākh-pasāva by Maharaja Jaswant Singh II upon his accession to the throne. His position in the court was regarded as equivalent to the highest rank of jagirdars. He was renowned throughout Rajputana for his erudition, benevolence, and farsightedness. The government wished to bestow several titles and honors related to state administration on him at various times, but he declined most of them and accepted only the title of Mahamahopadhyaya in recognition of his literary accomplishments.

== Works ==
Kaviraja Muraridan was not only a skilled administrator but also a prolific writer and a renowned scholar of multiple languages, including Dingal, Sanskrit, Prakrit, and Braj. His works include:

1. Yaśavaṃta-Yaśo-Bhūṣaṇa (यशवंतयशोभूषण)
2. Jasavaṃtabhūṣaṇa, a summary of Yaśavaṃta-Yaśo-Bhūṣaṇa (जसवंतभूषण)
3. Tawarikh Marwar (तवारीख़ मारवाड़)
4. Saṃkṣipta Cāraṇa Khyāti (संक्षिप्त चारण ख्याति)
5. Bar̥ī Cāraṇa Khyāti (बड़ी चारण ख्याति)
6. Saradāraprakāśikā (सरदारप्रकाशिका)
7. Ātmanirṇaya (Vedant) (आत्मनिर्णय (वेदांत))
8. A Commentary on Bihari Satsai (Bihārī Satasaī Tīkā)
9. A Treatise on Nāyikā Bheda

=== Yaśavaṃta-Yaśo-Bhūṣaṇa ===
This is a voluminous text, an exceptional modern treatise on alankāras, the essence of which is 'Jasavaṃtabhūṣaṇa' and has also been printed in Sanskrit translation. Kaviraja has considered the names of the alankāras as their characteristics (lakṣaṇa). Imagining the characteristic just from the name is the specialty of this text. Just as in the Chitramimamsa, where Appayya Dikshita has established all the alankāras as types of similes, similarly Kaviraja has defined the alankāras based on the meaning of their names without creating separate characteristics for them. By examining on the opinions of the ancients, he has counted the alankāras that come under the meaning of the word in that alankāra's category.

=== Muraridan ri Khyat ===
Aside from the above listed texts, one 'Muraridan ri Khyat' of unknown authorship is named after him which was discovered in the inner compartment of the walls in Jodhpur city, hidden before the occupation of Jodhpur by Mughals after the death of Jaswant Singh I in 1678. Kaviraja recognized its importance and had it copied out in bahis and stored in his collection.
