= Umaid Singh =

Maharaja of Jodhpur (1903–1947)

Maharaja Sir Umaid Singh
- Maharaja of Jodhpur
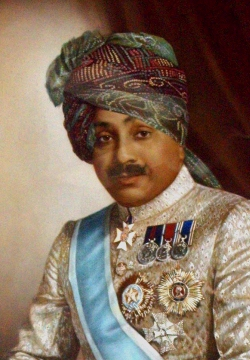
- Umaid Singh during his reign

Maharaja of Jodhpur
- Tenure: 3 October 1918 – 9 June 1947
- Predecessor: Sumer Singh
- Successor: Hanwant Singh
- Born: 8 July 1903; Mehrangarh Fort Jodhpur, Jodhpur State, Rajputana
- Died: 9 June 1947 (aged 43); Lake House, Mount Abu, Sirohi State, Rajputana
- Spouse: HH Maharaniji Sa Bhatiyaniji Shri Badan Kanwarji Saheba of Osiyan in Jodhpur State
- Issue: Hanwant Singh Maharajkumarji Shri Himmat Singh Maharajkumarji Shri Hari Singh Maharajkumarji Shri Devi Singh Maharajkumarji Shri Dileep Singh Maharajkumariji Baiji Lal Shri Rajendra Kanwarji m.to Lieutenant Colonel HH Farzand-e-Khas-e-Daulat-e-Inglishia, Maharaja Shrimant Fatehsinhrao Gaekwad, Sena Khas Khel Shumshair Bahadur of Baroda State
- House: Rathore
- Father: Sardar Singh I of Jodhpur
- Mother: HH Maharaniji Sa Hadiji Shri Lakshman Kanwarji Maji Saheba d.of HH Maharao Raja Sir Ram Singh of Bundi State
- Religion: Hinduism

Lieutenant-General HH Shri Raj Rajeshwar Saramad-e-Raja-e-Hindustan Maharajadhiraja Maharaja Sir Umaid Singh Bahadur, GCSI GCIE KCVO Assoc KStJ (8 July 1903 – 9 June 1947), also spelled Umed Singh, was the Maharaja of Jodhpur State of the historic Rathore dynasty of Marwar from the year 1918 to 1947 until his death.

The second son of HH Maharaja Sir Sardar Singh of Jodhpur, he succeeded his elder brother Maharaja Sir Sumer Singh upon his untimely death to a disease in 1918; in 1922 he served as the aide-de-camp to the Prince of Wales (later King Edward VIII). Ruling under the regency of his granduncle HH Maharaja Sir Pratap Singh of Idar State until 1923, he was then formally invested as Maharaja by Governor-General of India Lord Reading. During his reign, Sir Umaid Singh reformed and reorganised the Jodhpur State Forces and the judicial department, introduced a scheme for extending primary education, revised the land revenue settlement and established state pensions and a Provident Fund for state employees. Enjoying a distinguished military career, he died at his estate the Lake House on Mount Abu on 9 June 1947 after a progressive reign of 29 years, aged but 43. He died from an acute attack of appendicitis while on a tiger hunt.

== Honours ==
- Delhi Durbar silver medal-1911
- Prince of Wales Visit Medal-1922
- Knight Commander of the Royal Victorian Order (KCVO)-1922
- Knight Grand Commander of the Order of the Indian Empire (GCIE)-1930
- King George V Silver Jubilee Medal-1935
- Knight Grand Commander of the Order of the Star of India (GCSI)-1936 (KCSI-1925 Birthday Honours)
- King George VI Coronation Medal-1937
- Grand Cross of the Order of the Dragon of Annam-1940
- 1939-1945 Star-1945
- Africa Star-1945
- War Medal 1939-1945-1945
- India Service Medal-1945
- Knight of the Order of St John (KStJ)-1946
- Halvad-Dhrangadhra State Rajyabhisek Medal, 1st class-1948 (post-humous)

== See also ==
- Rulers of Marwar
