= Daulat Singh =

King Daulat Singh I

King of Idar
- Successor: King Himmat Singh I
- Born: Prince Daulat Singh of Marwar; 12 May 1875; Jodhpur, Kingdom of Marwar
- Died: 14 April 1931 (aged 55); Taj Mahal Hotel, Mumbai
- Father: Prince Bhupal Singh of Marwar
- Military career
- Conflicts: Tirah campaign Boxer Rebellion; First World War

Daulat Singh I, KCSI (12 May 1875 – 14 April 1931), was a Maharaja of the Kingdom of Idar from 1911 to 1931.

He served as a squadron commander with the Jodhpur Risala in the Tirah Campaign 1897–1898, and Boxer Rebellion in China 1900. Later, he served also in First World War as a Major in British Army from 1914 in the Great War in Egypt and the Middle East 1914-1918 and was promoted to Hon. Lieut-Col in 1918.

Daulat Singh was the son of Prince Bhupal Singh of Marwar, himself a son of King Takht Singh I and was adopted by his paternal half-uncle, King Pratap Singh I of Idar, who abdicated in his favour in 1911. He was appointed as a Knight Commander of the Order of the Star of India (KCSI) in the 1920 New Year Honours.

Daulat Singh I was succeeded by his eldest son, Himmat Singh.

== Titles ==
- 1875-1899: Rajkumar Sri Daulat Singh
- 1899-1902: Maharaj Sri Daulat Singh
- 1902-1911: Yuvaraja Sri Maharajkumar Daulat Singh Sahib
- 1911-1914: His Highness Maharajadhiraja Maharaja Sri Daulat Singh Sahib Bahadur, Maharaja of Idar
- 1914-1918: Major His Highness Maharajadhiraja Maharaja Sri Daulat Singh Sahib Bahadur, Maharaja of Idar
- 1918-1920: Lieutenant-Colonel His Highness Maharajadhiraja Maharaja Sri Daulat Singh Sahib Bahadur, Maharaja of Idar
- 1920-1926: Lieutenant-Colonel His Highness Maharajadhiraja Maharaja Sri Sir Daulat Singh Sahib Bahadur, Maharaja of Idar, KCSI
- 1926-1931: Colonel His Highness Maharajadhiraja Maharaja Sri Sir Daulat Singh Sahib Bahadur, Maharaja of Idar, KCSI

== Honours ==
(ribbon bar, as it would look today)

- India Medal w/ Tirah Clasp-1898
- China War Medal-1900
- King Edward VII Coronation Medal-1902 (w/ Delhi Durbar Bar-1903)
- King George V Coronation Medal w/Delhi Durbar Bar-1911
- 1914-15 Star-1918
- British War Medal-1918
- Allied Victory Medal-1918
- Knight Commander of the Order of the Star of India (KCSI)-1920
