= Jaswant Thada =

Cenotaph in Jodhpur, Rajasthan, India

Coordinates: 26°18′14″N 73°01′31″E

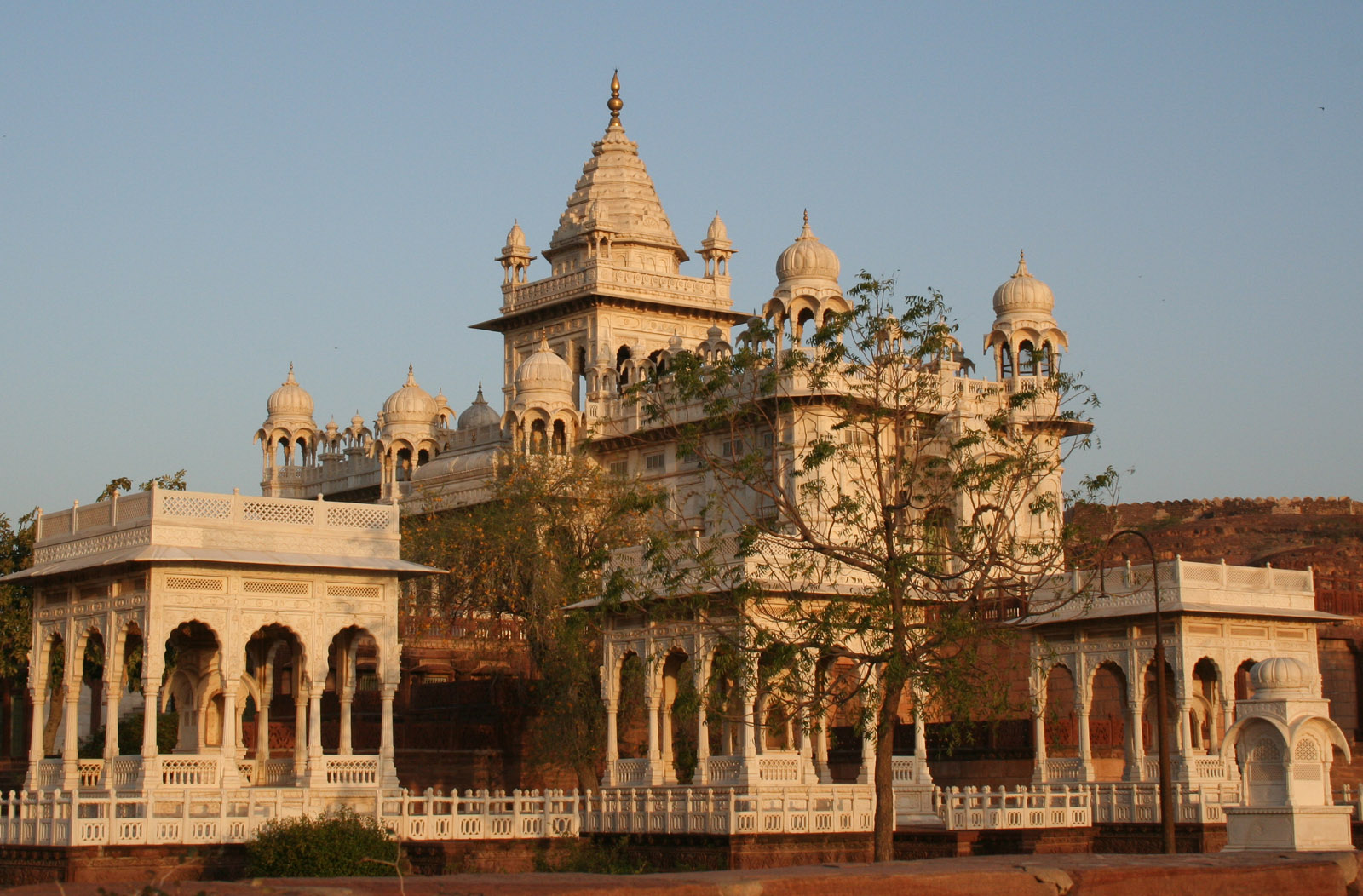
- The Jaswant Thada cenotaph in Jodhpur, India
- Interactive map of Jaswant Thada
- Location: Jodhpur, Rajasthan, India
- Builder: Maharaja Sardar Singh
- Type: Cenotaph
- Beginning date: 1899 AD
- Completion date: 1906; 120 years ago
- Dedicated to: Maharaja Jaswant Singh II

The Jaswant Thada is a cenotaph located in Jodhpur, in the Indian state of Rajasthan. It was built by Maharaja Sardar Singh of Jodhpur State in 1899 in memory of his father, Maharaja Jaswant Singh II, and serves as the cremation ground for the royal Rajput family of Marwar. The cenotaph is built out of intricately carved sheets of Makrana marble. These sheets are extremely thin and polished so that they emit a warm glow when illuminated by the Sun.

The cenotaph's grounds feature carved gazebos, a tiered garden, and a small lake. There are three other cenotaphs in the grounds. The cenotaph of Maharaja Jaswant Singh displays portraits of the rulers and Maharajas of Jodhpur.

== History ==
Jaswant Thada was commissioned in 1899 by Maharaja Sardar Singh of Jodhpur as a royal cenotaph in memory of his father, Maharaja Jaswant Singh II, and was completed in 1906 AD under the patronage of the Rathore dynasty. It is situated a short distance from Mehrangarh Fort, it was intended both as the Jodhpur royal family's cremation ground and as an enduring symbol of their legacy. Over the 20th century, the site became managed by the Mehrangarh Museum Trust, which has conserved its grounds and established an on‑site museum displaying portraits of Marwar rulers and didactic panels on regional history.

== Architecture ==
The Jaswant Thada was erected entirely of Makrana marble, Jaswant Thada's principal memorial is a pavilion‑style cenotaph composed of intricately carved, paper‑thin marble sheets that glow warmly under sunlight. The central dome resembling a miniature temple crown is supported by twelve slender marble pillars arranged in a square, each connected by finely detailed jali screens featuring floral and geometric motifs. These screens filter breeze and daylight to create shifting patterns across the interior. The structure is surrounded by the Tranquil lake, and the light reflections from the lake make the cenotaph looks like floating.

== Gallery ==
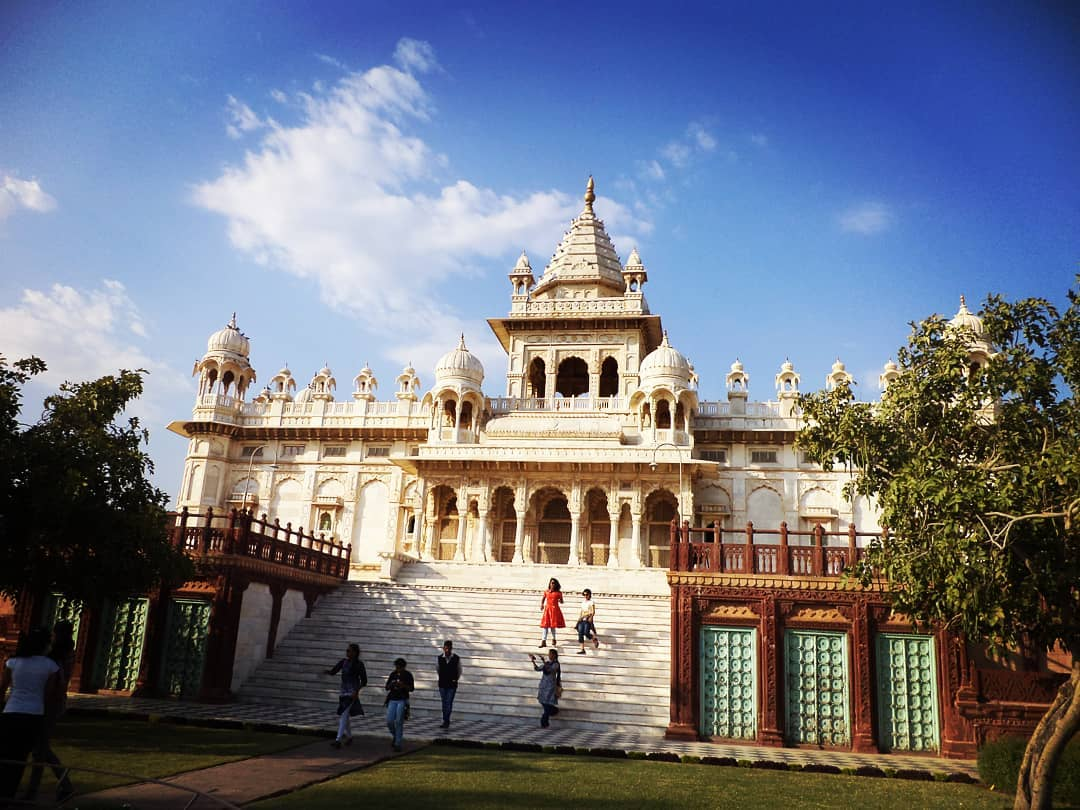
Jaswant thada front

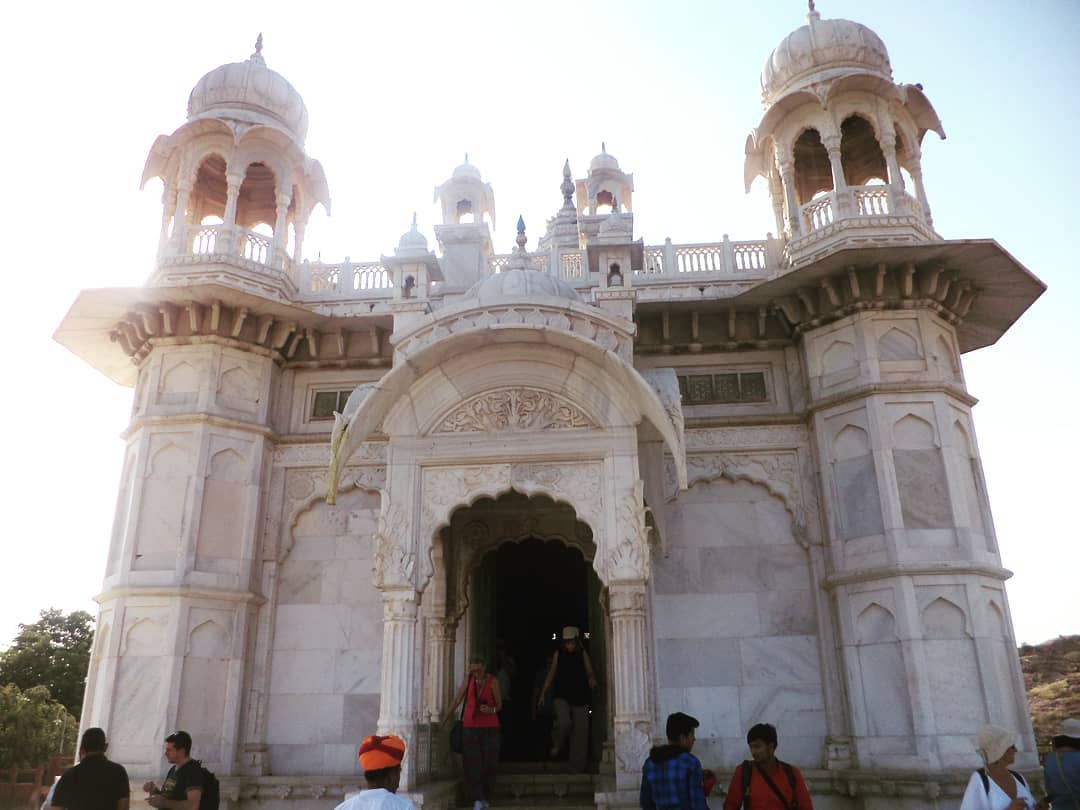
Side

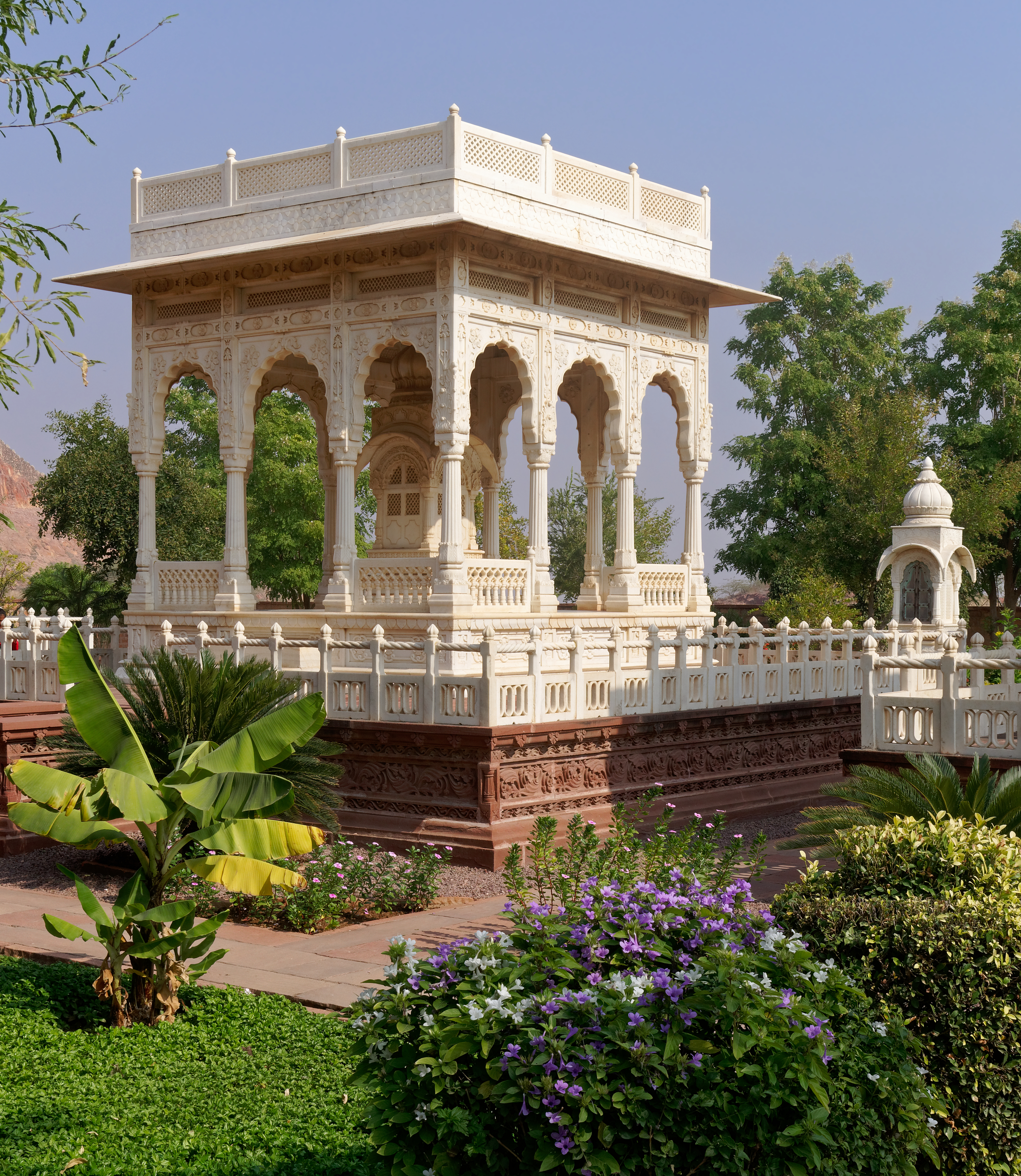
Inside view
