= Sumer Singh of Jodhpur =

Maharaja of Jodhpur (1898–1918)

Maharaja Sumer Singh
- Maharaja of Jodhpur
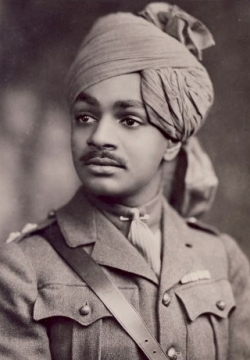
- Sumer Singh in the 1910s

Maharaja of Jodhpur
- Tenure: 20 March 1911 – 3 October 1918
- Predecessor: Sardar Singh
- Successor: Umaid Singh
- Born: 14 January 1898; Mehrangarh Fort Jodhpur Jodhpur State, Rajasthan, India
- Died: 3 October 1918 (aged 20); Ratanada Palace Jodhpur Jodhpur State
- Spouse: HH Maharaniji Sa Jadejiji Shri Pratap Kanwarji/Kunwarba of Jamnagar State HH Maharaniji Sa Chauhanji Shri Amar Kanwarji of Sointra in Jodhpur State
- Issue: Maharajkumariji Baiji Lal Shri Kishor Kanwarji m.to HH Maharajadhiraj Maharaja Sir Sawai Man Singh II of Jaipur State
- House: Rathore
- Father: Maharaja Sardar Singh of Jodhpur
- Mother: HH Maharaniji Sa Hadiji Shri Lakshman Kanwarji Maji Saheba d.of HH Maharao Raja Sir Ram Singh of Bundi State
- Religion: Hinduism

Colonel HH Shri Raj Rajeshwar Saramad-e-Raja-e-Hindustan Maharajadhiraja Maharaja Sir Sumair Singh Bahadur,KBE (14 January 1898 – 3 October 1918) was the Maharaja of Jodhpur State of the Rathore dynasty of Marwar from 20 March 1911 to 3 October 1918 the shortest of reign any Jodhpur ruler had.

== Early life ==
Sumer Singh was born on 14 January 1898 at Mehrangarh, Jodhpur, the eldest son of Maharaja Sir Sardar Singh, GCSI by his first wife, the Maharani Shri Lakhsman Kanwarji Maji Sahiba. In March 1911 at the age of 13, he succeeded to the Jodhpur gadi upon the death of his father, and served as a page of honour to George V at the Delhi Durbar that year.

He was educated at Mayo College, Ajmer and Wellington College in Berkshire, he reigned for five years under the regency of his great-uncle General Maharaja Sir Pratap Singh of Idar, who had abdicated his throne at Idar in order to oversee the Jodhpur regency.

== Wartime service ==
Upon the outbreak of the First World War, the young Maharaja volunteered to serve in combat and was commissioned as an honorary Lieutenant in the British Army in October 1914. On 26 February 1916, a month after he had come of age, Sumer Singh was granted full ruling powers by the Viceroy, Lord Hardinge, in person. Shortly after, he left India for the battlefields of the Western Front, leading the Jodhpur Imperial Service Lancers in combat in France and Flanders. He was promoted to the rank of an honorary Major in the British Army in 1917. For his services, Sumer Singh was decorated and subsequently knighted as a Knight Commander of the Order of the British Empire (KBE) in 1918.

== Personal life ==
On 9 December 1915, Sumer Singh married Pratapha Kanwarji Maji Sahiba, the daughter of Kumar Jivansinhji Jhalamsinhji Sahib of Sarodar, a branch of the Nawanagar royal family, and the sister of cricketer Ranjitsinhji. He married secondly, on 23 May 1918, Umrao Kanwarji Sahiba (d. 30 November 1949), the daughter of Thakur Shri Suraj Malji, of Sointra, under Jodhpur Marwar.

By his first wife, Sumer Singh had one daughter: Maharajkumari Shri Kishor Kumariji Baijilal Sahiba [H.H. Maharani Shri Kishor Kumari Sahiba, of Jaipur] ["Jo Didi"] (Mehrangarh, Jodhpur, 20 September 1916 – Rambagh Palace, Jaipur, 30 April 1958) who m. at Mehrangarh, Jodhpur, 24 April 1932, as his second wife, Maharaja Sawai Man Singh II of Jaipur, Maharaja of Jaipur.

Sumer Singh's sister, Marudhar Kanwar, was the first wife of Maharaja Sawai Man Singh II of Jaipur.

== Death ==
The Maharaja returned to Jodhpur in early 1918, but died on 3 October from pneumonia at the Ratanada Palace. He was cremated at Mehrangarh. As he had only left a daughter at his death, he was succeeded by his younger brother Umaid Singh.

== Honours ==
=== British ===
- 1911 Delhi Durbar medal in gold
- 1914 Star (with August - November 1914 clasp)
- British War Medal
- Victory Medal
- Knight Commander of the Order of the British Empire, (KBE) - awarded 1918

=== Foreign ===
- Grand Cordon of the Order of the Nile of Egypt-1918
