= Himmatsinhji =

Himmatsinhji (or Himatsinhji) is a Gujarati personal name often used by the Rajputs, which includes the suffixes -sinh and -ji. Another variant is Himmat Singh. People with the name include:

- Himmat Singh (1899–1960), last ruler of the princely state of Idar State
- Himmatsinhji (general) (1897–1973), Indian general, politician, and sportsman, first Lieutenant-Governor of Himachal Pradesh
- Himmatsinhji M. K. (1928–2008), Indian politician and ornithologist, son of the Maharao Saheb of Kutch
- Himmat Singh (Sikhism) (1661–1705), one of the Five Beloved in Sikhism
- Himmat Singh (cricketer) (born 1996), Indian cricketer
