= Pratap Singh of Idar =

Maharaja of Idar (1845–1922)

Pratap Singh I
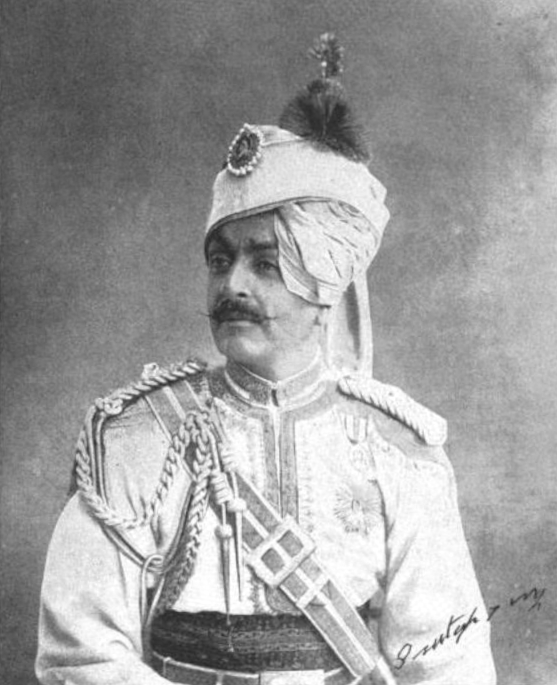
- Pratap Singh in 1899

King of Idar
- Reign: 12 February 1902 – May 1911
- Coronation: 9 June 1926
- Predecessor: King Krishnasinh I
- Successor: King Daulat Singh I

Regent of Marwar
- Regencies: 1st 11 October 1895 – 18 February 1898; 2nd 6 April 1911 – 26 February 1916; 3rd 3 October 1918 – September 1922
- Monarchs: King Sardar Singh I (1895 - 1898); King Sumer Singh I (1911 - 1916); King Umaid Singh I (1918 - 1922)
- Born: Prince Pratap Singh of Marwar; 22 October 1845
- Died: 4 September 1922 (aged 76); Jodhpur, Kingdom of Marwar
- Father: Takht Singh I of Marwar
- Mother: Princess Gulab Kunwar of Dhamotar
- Military career
- Conflicts: Second Anglo-Afghan War; Tirah campaign Boxer Rebellion; First World War

Lieutenant General His Highness Maharajadhiraja Sir Pratap Singh I, KCB, GCSI, GCVO (22 October 1845 – 4 September 1922), was a Maharaja of the Kingdom of Idar, administrator and Regent of the Kingdom of Marwar and heir to Ahmednagar later renamed as Himmatnagar from 1902 to 1911.

== Early life ==
Pratap was born on 22 October 1845 in Jodhpur, as the third son of Takht Singh I of Marwar and his first wife Queen Gulab Kunwar. He was educated privately, and little is known of his early life. He received administrative training under Ram Singh II of Jaipur.

== Administrator and Regent ==
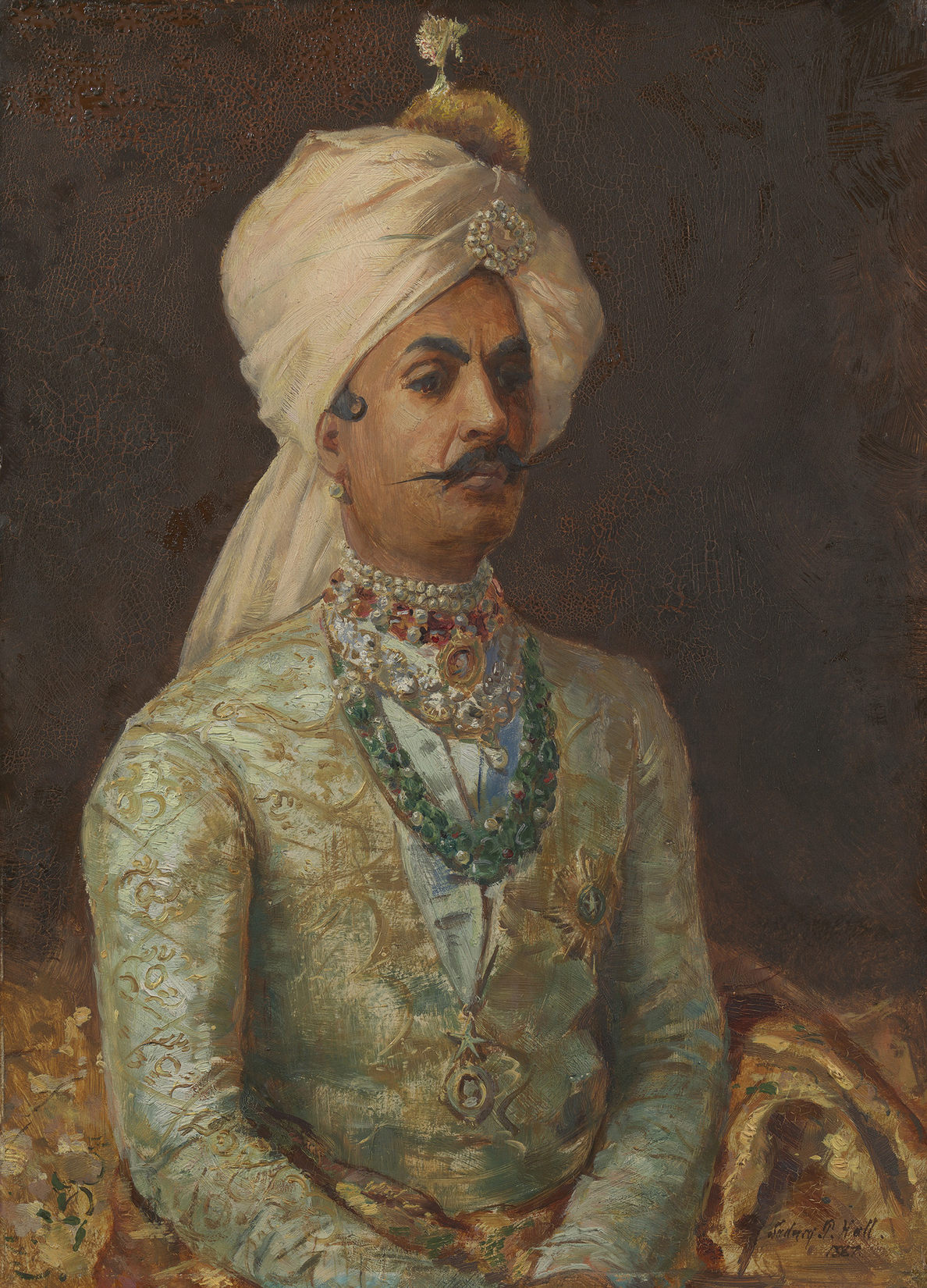
Portrait of Pratap Singh by Sydney Prior Hall, 1887

After their father's death in 1873, his eldest brother Maharaja Jaswant Singh succeeded to the throne of Marwar. Maharaja Jaswant Singh invited by Pratap Singh to lead Jodhpur state administration. From 1878 to 1895, Singh served as Chief Minister for Jodhpur. After his brother's death in 1895, he served as regent for his fifteen-year-old nephew and heir to the Jodhpur throne Sardar Singh of Jodhpur until 1898, then again for his grandnephew Sumer Singh of Jodhpur from 1911 to 1918 and finally for his second grandnephew Umaid Singh from 1918 until his own death in 1922. In total, Pratap Singh had served four rulers of Jodhpur for over four decades. Following the death of the ruler of Idar in 1901, Pratap Singh was Maharajah of that state from 1902 until he resigned in favor of his adopted son in 1911 to return to Jodhpur to be regent. He travelled to Europe often and was close to Queen Victoria and her family, serving as aide-de-camp to Edward VII from 1887 to 1910. He was especially close towards his son, the future George V of the United Kingdom.

== Soldier of the Empire ==
Commissioned in the Jodhpur Risala in 1878, Singh served during the Second Afghan War and was mentioned in dispatches. He was promoted to lieutenant-colonel in 1887, served under General Ellis in 1897 and served in the Tirah Campaign in 1898 under General William Lockhart, during which he was wounded. Promoted to an Honorary Colonel the same year, he commanded the Jodhpur contingent during the Boxer Rebellion and was promoted to an Honorary Knight Commander of the Order of the Bath (KCB). In late 1901 he accepted the post of honorary commandant of the Imperial Cadet Corps under Lord Curzon, and was promoted to the honorary rank of major-general on 9 August 1902. He attended the 1903 Delhi Durbar as an Aide-de-Camp to the Emperor, riding as part of the Viceroy's main entourage.

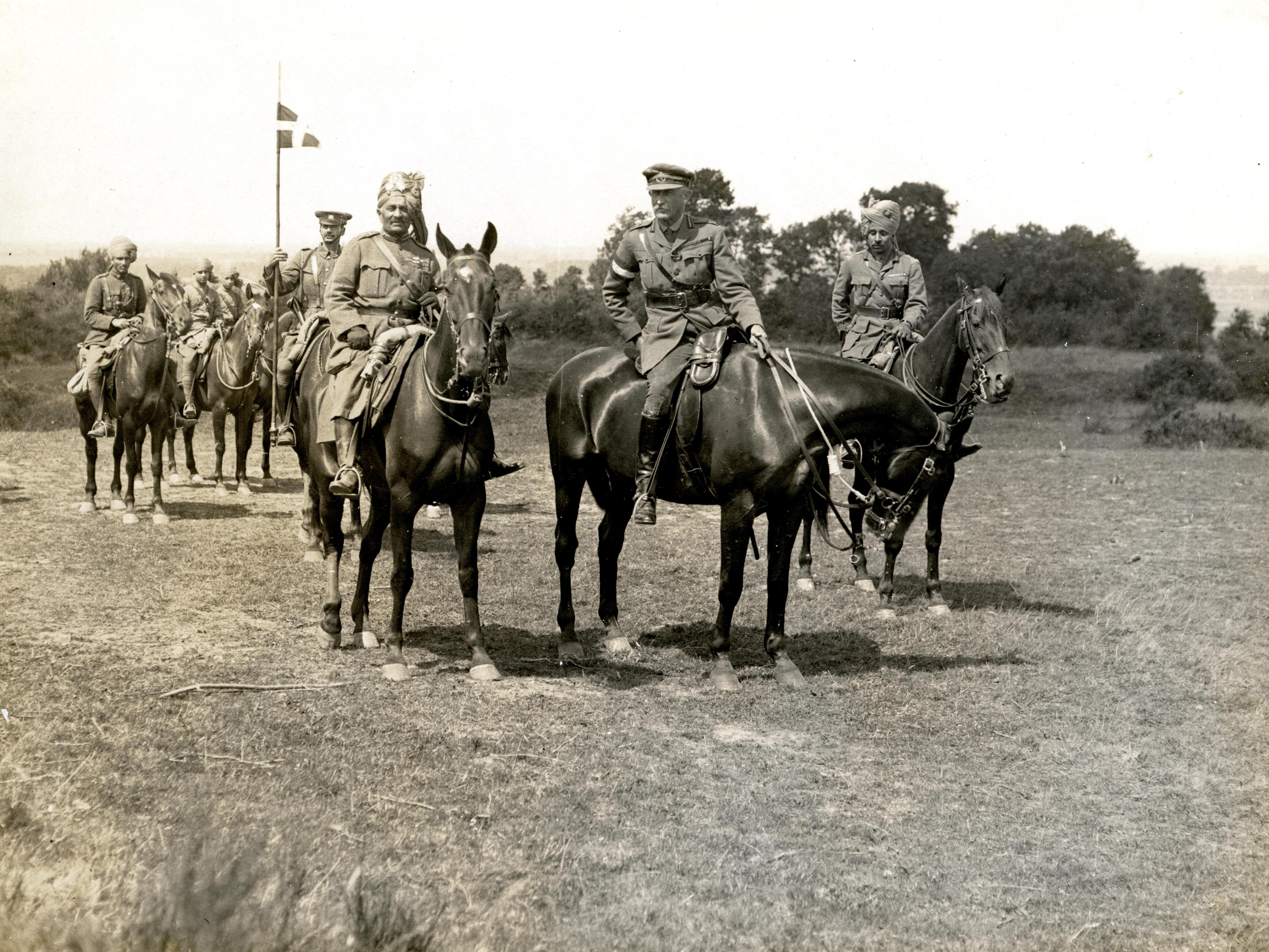
Singh (third from right) riding alongside Michael Rimington and Sajjan Singh in Linghem, 28 July 1915

Even as an elderly man of 70, Sir Pratap commanded his regiments during the First World War in France and Flanders from 1914 to 1915 and in the Palestine Mandate at Haifa and Aleppo. He led the Jodhpur Lancers, a cavalry unit, in France. He was promoted to the honorary rank of lieutenant-general in 1916.

== Later years ==
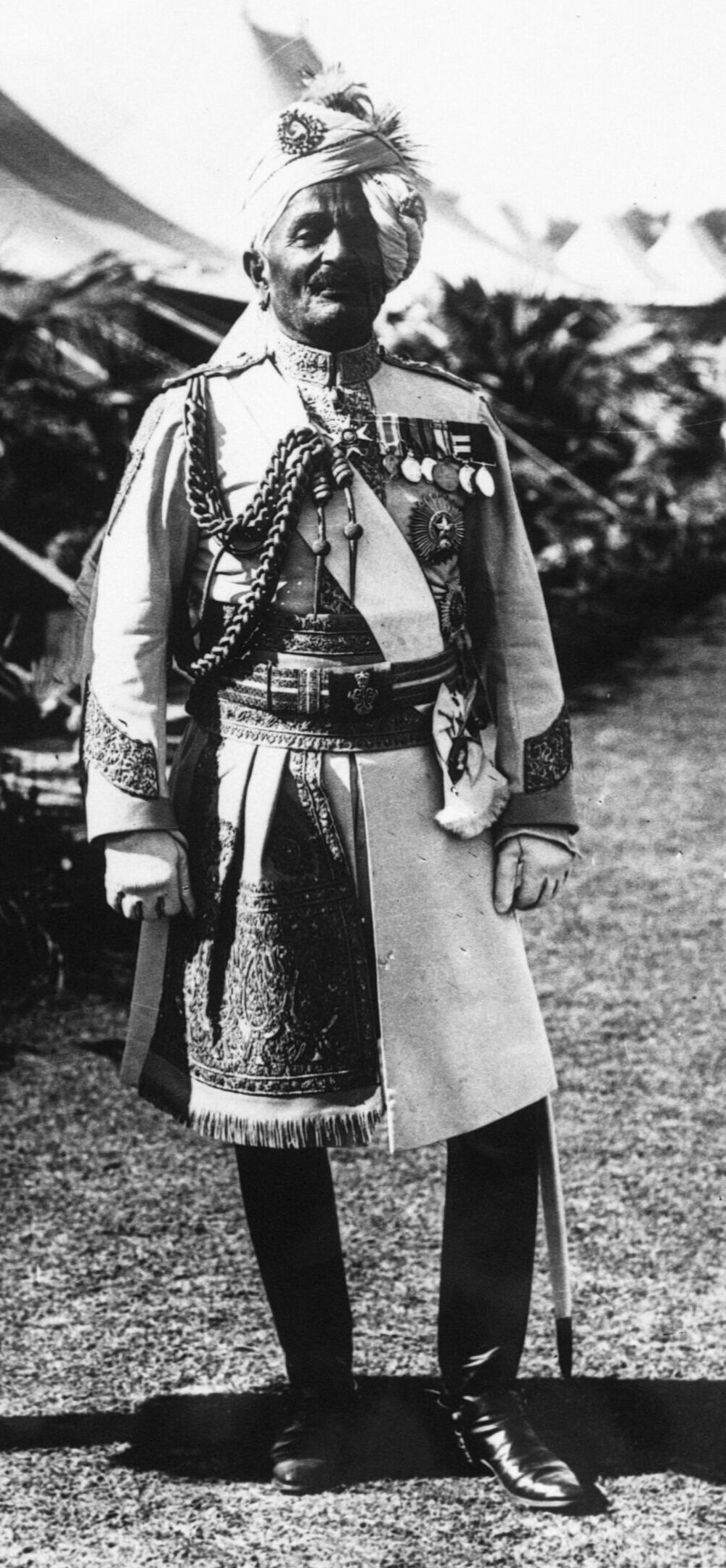
Singh in 1914

In 1911, Pratap abdicated the gadi (throne) of Idar. Following his wartime service and a final stint as Regent of Jodhpur, Singh died at Jodhpur on 4 September 1922. Sir Pratap had a son Rao Raja Sagat Singh Ji who had a Son Devi Singh Ji of Jodhpur married to Padma Deiji (Rao Rani Shri Padma Devi Sahiba) is the daughter of Lieutenant-Colonel Maharaja Sir Narendra Shah of the Tehri Garhwal princely state and Maharani Indu Matt Devi. She was born on 2 August 1933. She married Captain Rao Raja Devi Singh of the royal family of Idar on 8 December 1948. Her husband was the son of Rao Raja Sagat Singh. Additional members of her immediate family include: Sibling: Her brother was Maharaja Manabendra Shah, a prominent Indian diplomat and politician who served multiple terms as a Member of Parliament for the Tehri Garhwal constituency. Nephew: The current head of the royal house of Tehri Garhwal is her nephew, Maharaja Manujendra Shah.

== Honours ==
(ribbon bar, as it would look today)

Singh's honours included:

- Empress of India Gold Medal, 1877
- Mentioned in dispatches (MID), 1878
- Afghanistan Medal, 1878
- Queen Victoria Golden Jubilee Medal 1887, with Diamond Jubilee bar, 1897
- Mentioned in dispatches (MID) 1897
- Knight Grand Commander of the Order of the Star of India (GCSI), 1897; KCSI, 1886; CSI, 1878
- India Medal w/Clasp, 1898
- Kaisar-i-Hind Medal 1st Class, 1900
- China War Medal, 1901 (He received the medal in person by King Edward VII during an audience in June 1902, when he visited London to attend the King's coronation)
- King Edward VII Coronation Medal, 1902, with Delhi Durbar Clasp, 1903
- Honorary commandant - Imperial Cadet Corps - 1904
- King George V Coronation Medal, 1911, with Delhi Durbar Clasp
- Knight Grand Cross of the Royal Victorian Order (GCVO), 1911
- 1914 Star, 1919
- British War Medal, 1919
- Allied Victory Medal, 1919
- GCB: Honorary Knight Grand Cross of the Order of the Bath, 1918 (KCB, 1900) (CB, 1898)
  - KCB(m): Honorary Knight Commander of the Order of the Bath (Military Division) – 29 November 1900 – in recognition of services during the recent operations in China (Boxer Rebellion). He was invested personally by King Edward VII during an audience in June 1902, when he visited London to attend the King's coronation.
- Grand Cordon of the Order of the Nile of Egypt, 1918
- Grand Officer of the Legion d'Honneur, 1918
- Jodhpur Great War Medal, 1919
- Grand Cross of the Order of the Star of Romania, 1921

== Titles ==
- 1845-1873: Maharajkumar Shri Pratap Singh Sahib
- 1873-1878: Maharaj Shri Pratap Singh Sahib
- 1878-1886: Second Lieutenant Maharaj Shri Pratap Singh Sahib, CSI
- 1886-1887: Second Lieutenant Maharaj Shri Sir Pratap Singh Sahib, KCSI
- 1887-1897: Lieutenant-Colonel Maharaj Shri Sir Pratap Singh Sahib, KCSI
- 1897-1898: Lieutenant-Colonel Maharaj Shri Sir Pratap Singh Sahib, GCSI
- 1898-1901: Colonel Maharaj Shri Sir Pratap Singh Sahib, GCSI, CB
- 1901-1902: Colonel Maharaj Shri Sir Pratap Singh Sahib, GCSI, KCB
- 1902-1911: Major-General His Highness Maharajadhiraja Maharaja Shri Sir Pratap Singh Sahib Bahadur, Maharaja of Idar, GCSI, KCB
- 1911-1916: Major-General His Highness Maharajadhiraja Maharaja Shri Sir Pratap Singh Sahib Bahadur, GCSI, GCVO, KCB
- 1916-1918: Lieutenant-General His Highness Maharajadhiraja Maharaja Shri Sir Pratap Singh Sahib Bahadur, GCSI, GCVO, KCB
- 1918-1922: Lieutenant-General His Highness Maharajadhiraja Maharaja Shri Sir Pratap Singh Sahib Bahadur, GCB, GCSI, GCVO

== Legacy ==
The poem A Ballad of Sir Pertab Singh was written by Henry Newbolt, which tells about the friendships the Maharaja had with an Englishman.
