= Imperial Cadet Corps =

Military school and cadet corps in British India

The Imperial Cadet Corps (1901–1917) was a cadet corps or military school founded exclusively to give officer training to the princes and gentlemen of British India. It was founded in November 1901 under the direct surveillance of Lord Curzon at Meerut and Dehradun. Major D. H. Cameron was made its first commandant and Maharaja Pratap Singh of Idar was made its Honorary Commandant. The youths between 17 and 20 years were selected and admitted as Imperial Cadets; their education was to be at any one of the Chief's college at Rajkot, Indore, Lahore, Ajmer or Raipur. The selected cadets had to join the corps at Meerut or Dehradun. Though the ICC failed in course of time and was closed in 1917, it nevertheless established the precedent for the officer training of Indians in India, which resulted in the founding of the Indian Military Academy at Dehradun in 1932.

== Notable alumni ==
- Maharaja Hari Singh of Princely State of Jammu and Kashmir
- Maharaja Pratap Singh of Idar
- Maharajah Shrimant Sir Sajjan Singh of Ratlam
- Major General Thakur Amar Singh of Kanota
- Maharana Shri Sir Vijayasinhji Chhatrasinhji, Maharaja of Rajpipla
- Maharawal Sir Shri Ranjitsimhji Mansimhji of Baria
- Raja Samander Singh Of Weir, Bharatpur
