= Marwar =

Region in Rajasthan, India

Marwar मारवाड़
- Historical and cultural region
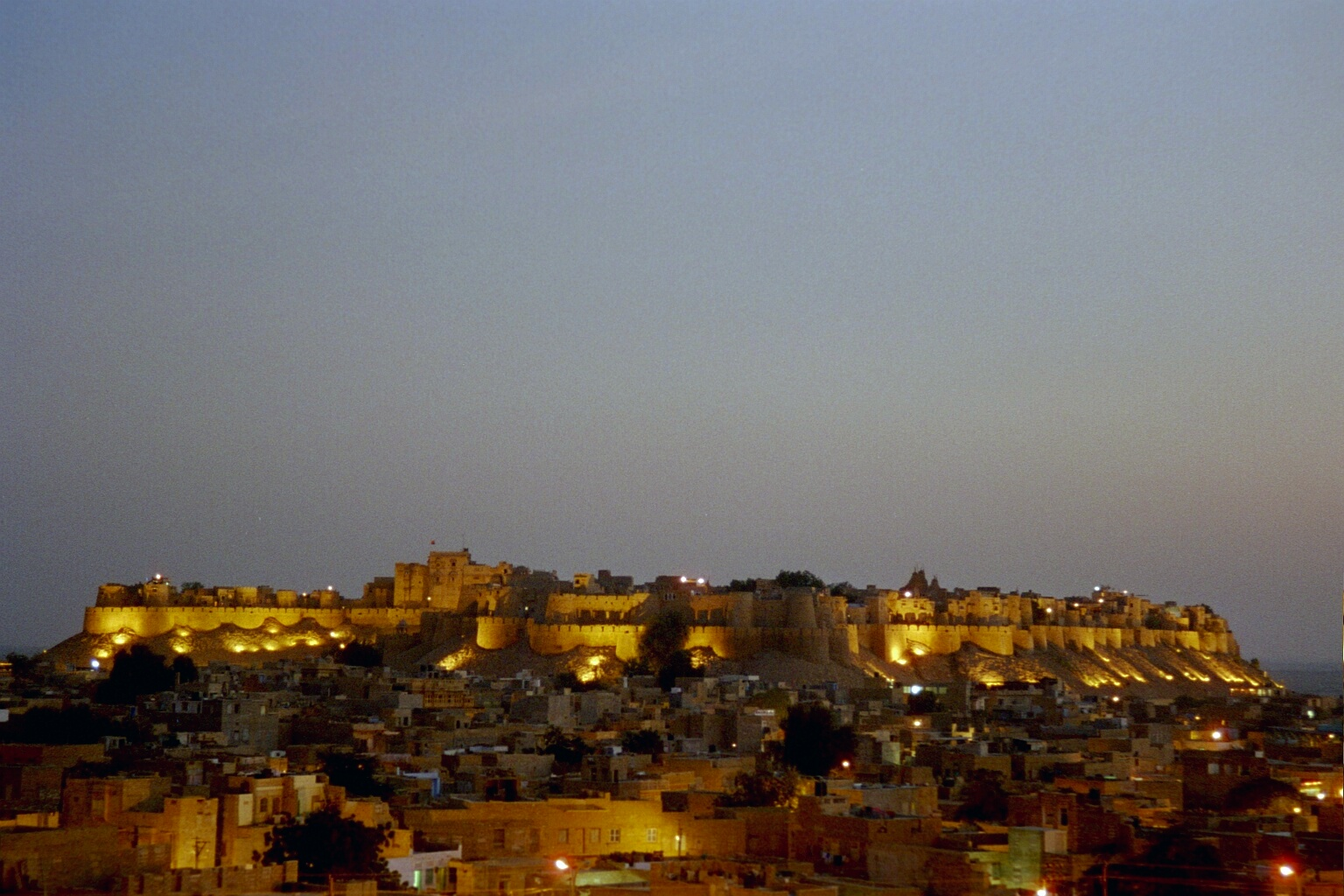
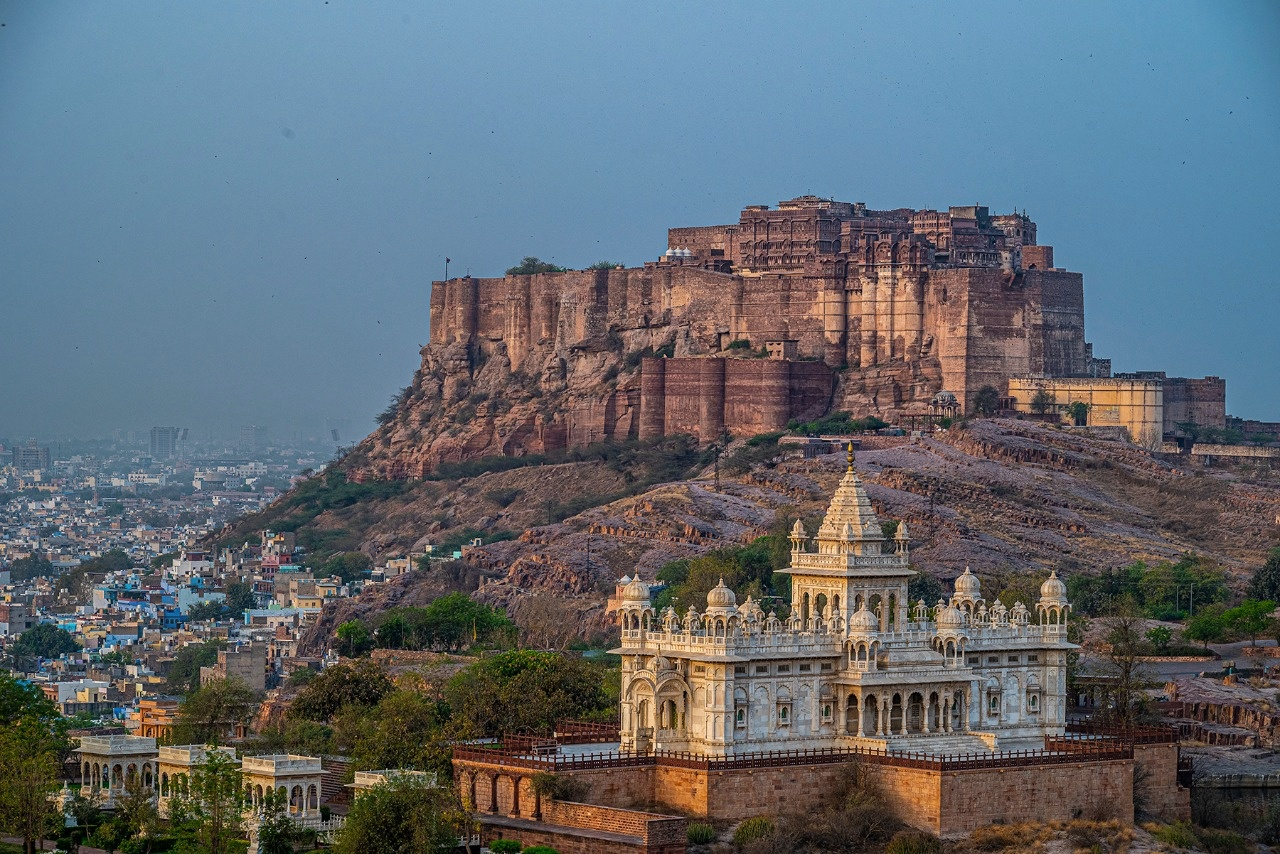
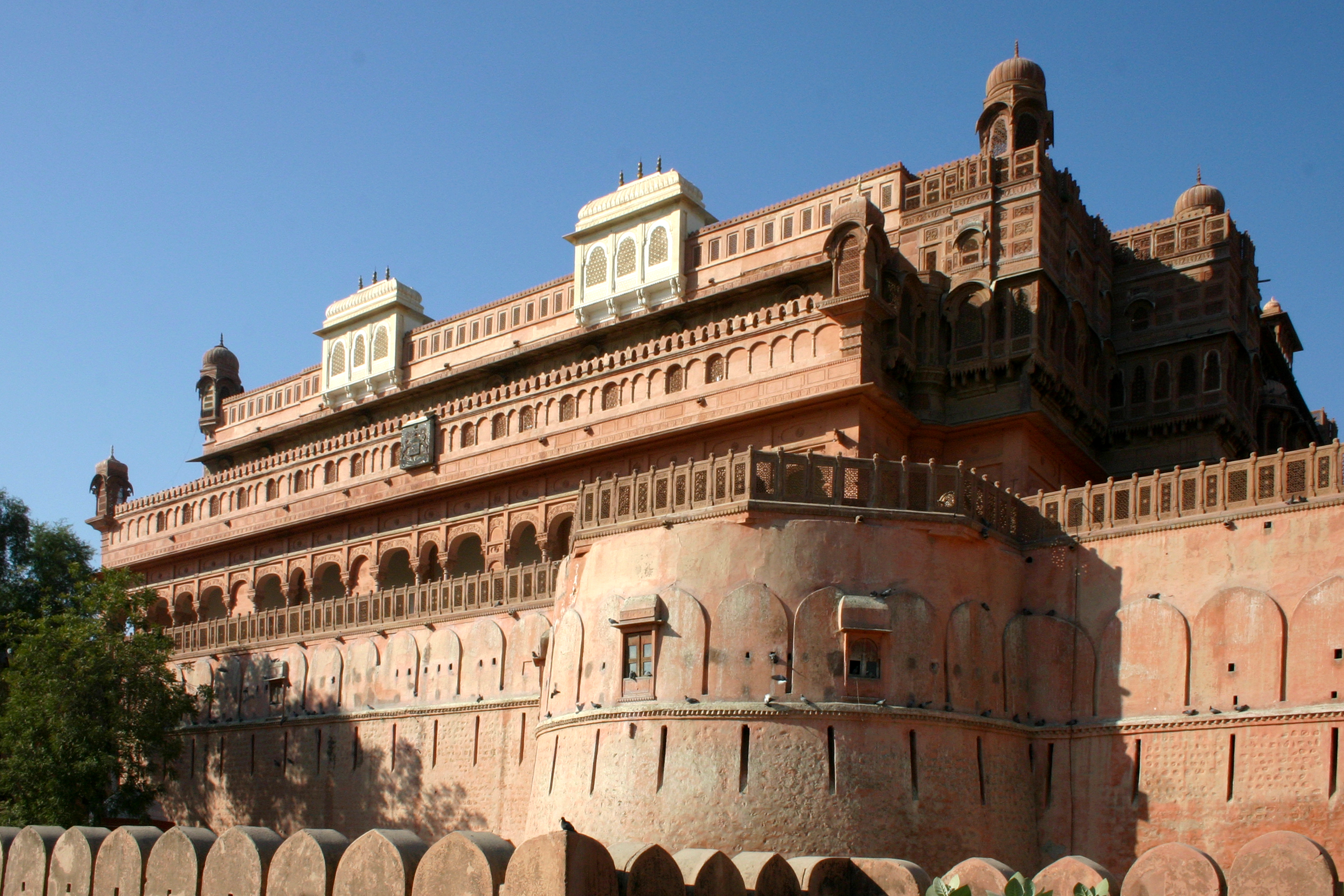
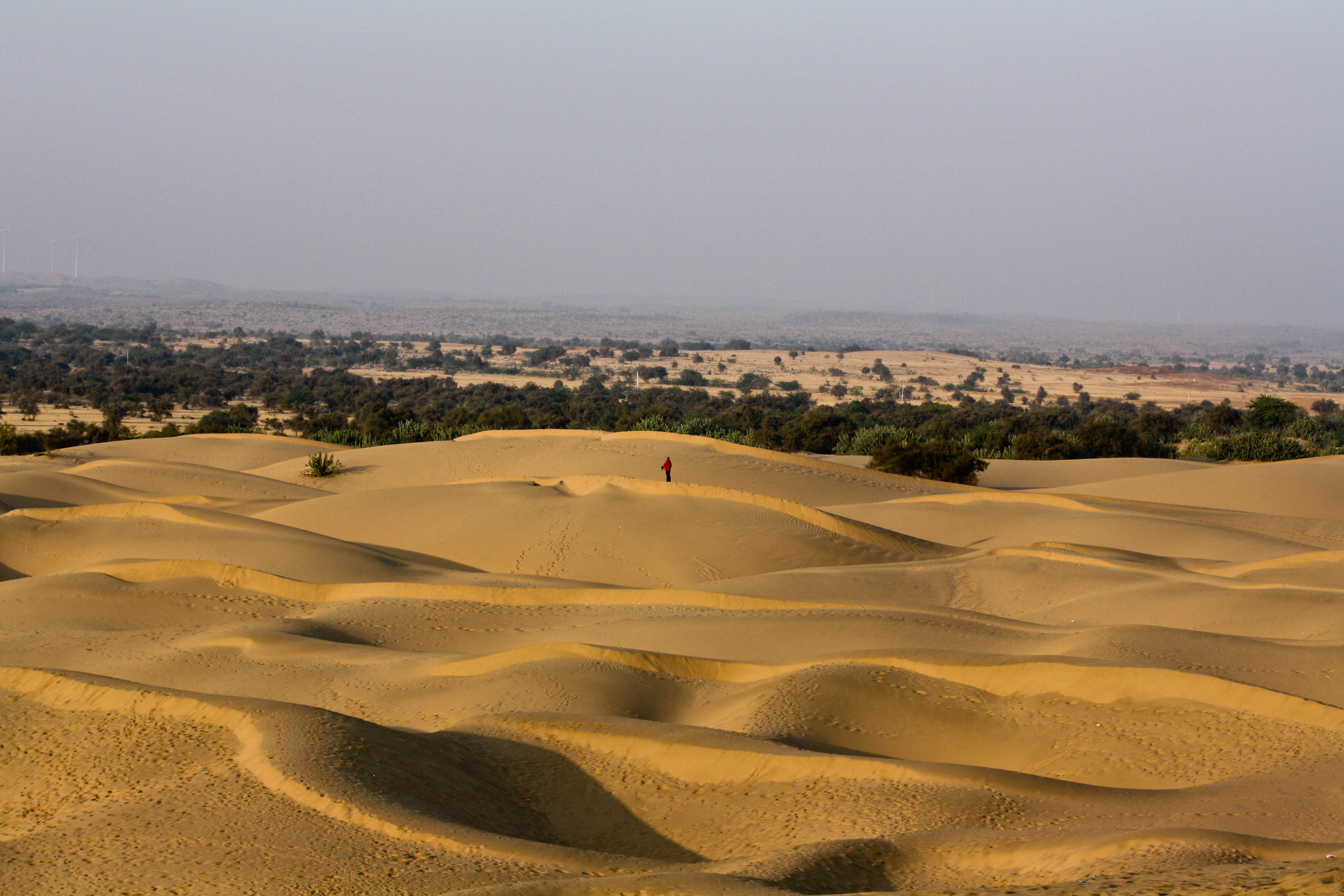
- Jaisalmer Fort, Jaisalmer Mehrangarh Fort, Jodhpur Junagarh Fort, Bikaner Thar Desert

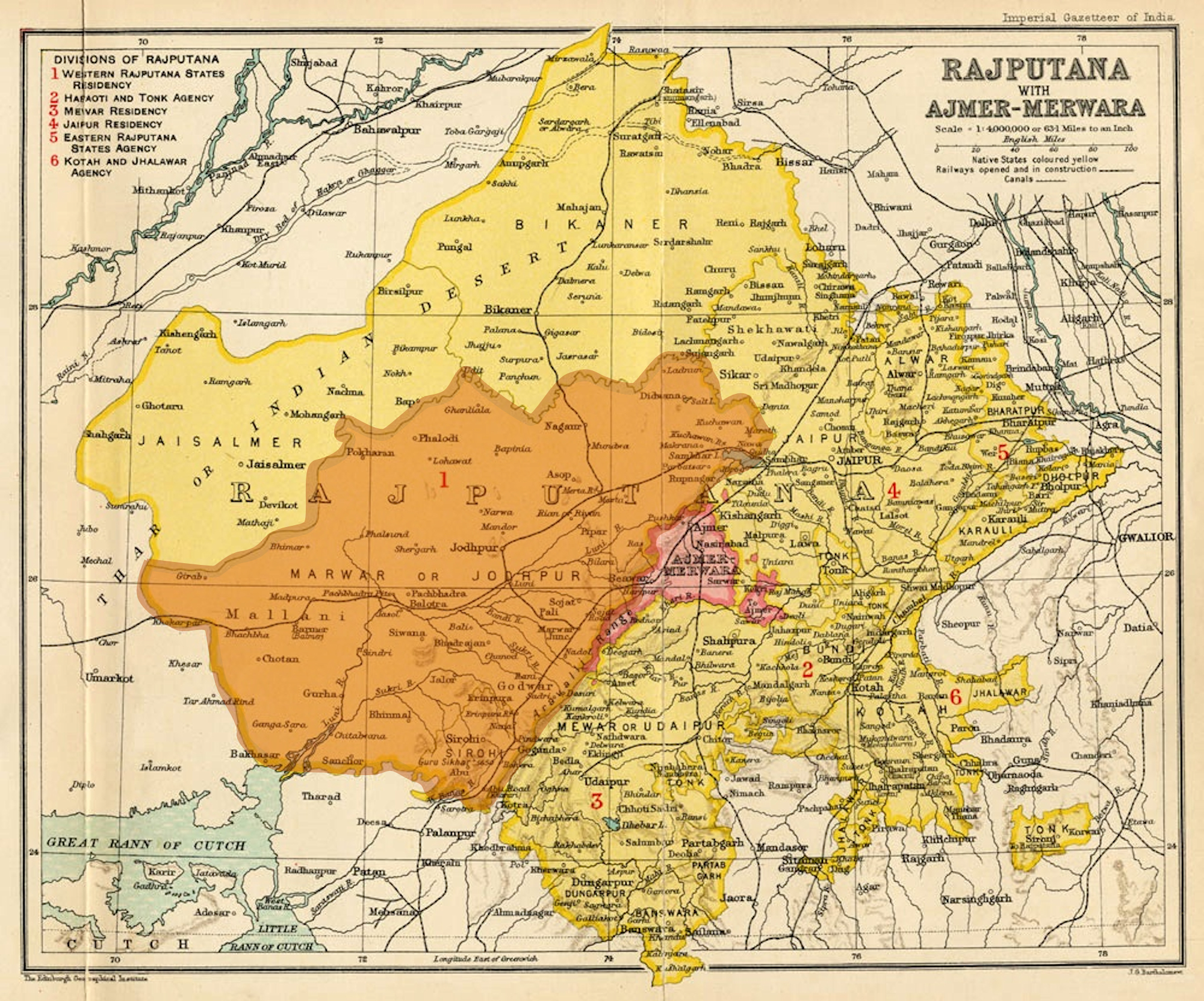
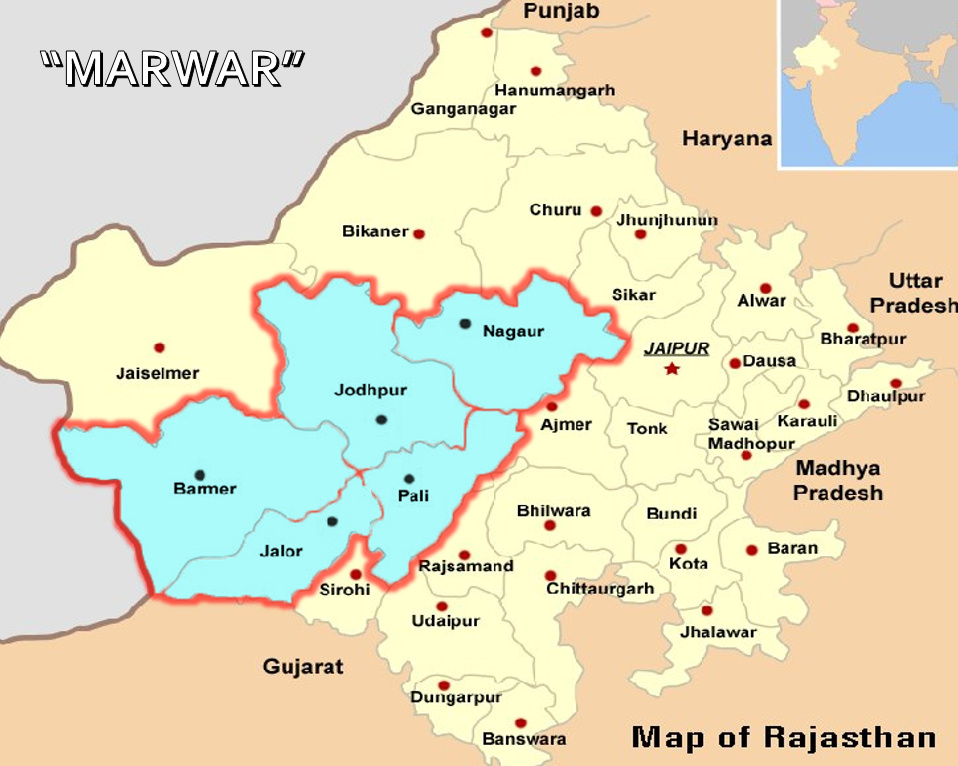
- Top: Kingdom of Marwar within Rajputana c.1907-1909 Bottom: Marwar region in Rajasthan, India
- Continent: Asia
- Country: India
- State: Rajasthan
- Districts: Jodhpur, Nagaur, Barmer, Pali & Jalore: Greater Marwar; Bikaner & Jaisalmer
- Demonym: Marwari
- Largest city: Jodhpur
- Regional Language or dialect: Marwari (Rajasthani)

Marwar (Marwari: [maːɾwaːɽ], also called Jodhpur region, Marwari: [d͡ʒoːd̪ʱpʊɾ]) is a cultural and historical region in the western part of the Indian state of Rajasthan. The Thar Desert is located in this region of Rajasthan and stretches westward into Pakistan's Sindh province. The language of this region is known as Marwari, which is the most widely spoken language of the Rajasthani family of languages.

In its most contracted definition, Marwar refers to the area governed by the erstwhile princely state of Jodhpur, comprising present-day districts of Jodhpur, Barmer, Jalore, Nagaur, and Pali. Although the former kingdoms of Bikaner and Jaisalmer were independent of the Marwar state, they are often included in the broader Marwar region due to geographical and cultural affinities.

The region has lent its name to the Marwaris, also known as Marwari Banias—a historically enterprising trading community that migrated across India, and came to play a significant role in the country's commercial and financial spheres.

Historically, the term 'Marwar' referred to a geographical entity spanning a cultural area across nearly all of Rajasthan.

== Etymology ==
The name Marwar is commonly believed to derive from the Sanskrit word "Maru" (मरु), meaning desert, and a regional suffix "wār" or "vāra", meaning region or land. Thus, Marwar can be interpreted as “the region of the desert”. Historically, the area was also referred to as "Maru-bhumi" (मरुभूमि) and "Marusthali" (मरुस्थली) meaning desert land, and also has been interpreted as ‘land of death and thirst’ in folklore.

The use of the term Marwar became more prominent during the medieval period, particularly under Rajput rule, as the Rathore dynasty consolidated their control over the region. The Persian-influenced form “Marwar” likely evolved from the earlier Sanskritized names through linguistic adaptations common during the Delhi Sultanate and Mughal periods.

== Geography ==
In 1901, the region (Jodhpur state) had an area of 93,424 square kilometres (36,071 mi^{2}).

Marwar is a sandy plain lying northwest of the Aravalli Range, which runs southwest-northeast through Rajasthan state. The Aravallis wring much of the moisture from the southwest monsoon, which provides most of India's rainfall. Annual rainfall is low, ranging from 10 cm to 40 cm. Temperatures range from 48 to 50 degrees Celsius in the summer, to below freezing point in winter. The northwestern thorn scrub forests lie next to the Aravalli Range, while the rest of the region lies in the Thar Desert.

The Luni River is the principal feature of the Marwar plains. It originates from the Pushkar valley of Ajmer district, and the main river flows through Marwar in a south-westerly direction until it finally disappears into the seasonal wetland of the Rann of Kutch in Gujarat. It is fed by tributaries that flow from the Aravallis. Irrigation from the river, and from wells near the river, support crops of wheat and barley.

The sandy tracts of Thar Desert in western Marwar (Maru Pradesh) are characterised by a harsh physical geography and a fragile ecology. High wind velocity, shifting sand dunes and very deep and saline water sources pose a challenge to sustained human habitation in the Thar.

The area is prone to devastating droughts. The Thar Desert is one of the most inhospitable landscapes on earth. Apart from the huge distances between hamlets and settlements here, the landscape is constantly shifting with the sand, as wind and sandstorms re-arrange the landscape. This, added to the lack of water in such an arid region, means that the villagers often find themselves migrating on foot across hundreds of miles towards neighbouring states in search of water.

== History ==
Hieun Tsang described a kingdom in Rajasthan, which he calls Ku-cha-lo (or Gurjara), largely because the whole of the Marwar area of Rajasthan was more or less identified with the Gurjara, as early as the 6th or 7th century. The Gurjara Pratihara, established a kingdom in the Marwar region in the 6th century, with a capital at Mandore, 9 km from present-day Jodhpur. The ruined city of Osian, or Ossian, 65 km from Jodhpur, was an important religious centre of the Pratihara period.

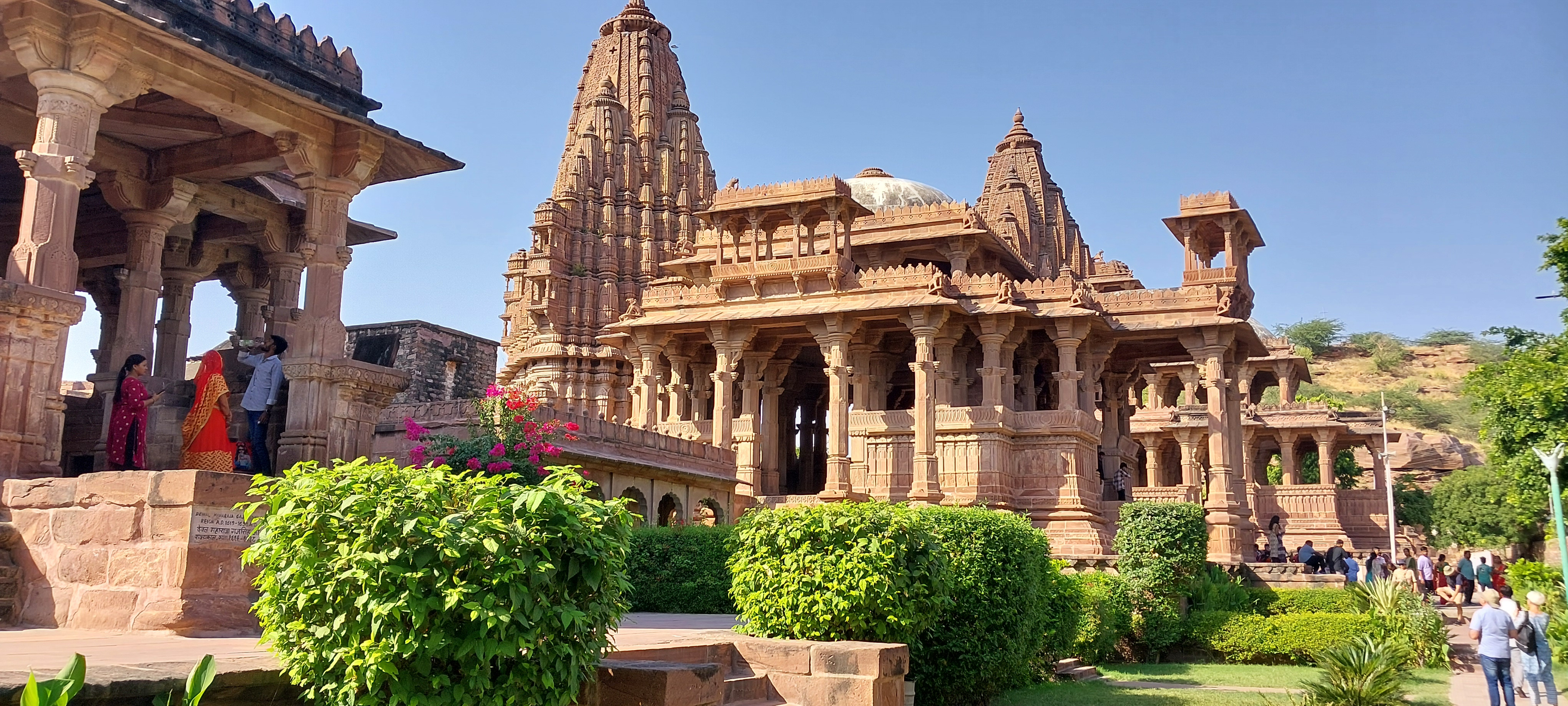
Cenotaphs at Mandore Gardens.

The royal Rathore family of Jodhpur are the descent from the famous Rashtrakuta dynasty. On the fall of the Rashtrakuta dynasty they migrated north to Kannauj. After the sacking of Kannauj by Muhammad of Ghor in 1194, and its capture by the Delhi Sultanate in the early 13th century, the Rathores fled west. The Rathore family chronicles relate that Rao Siha, grandson of Jai Chandra, the last Gahadvala king of Kannauj, came to Marwar on a pilgrimage to Dwarka in Gujarat. On halting at the town of Pali he and his followers settled there to protect the Brahmin community from the raids of marauding bands. The brahmans of Pali requested Siha to settle in Pali and become their King. Rao (king) Chunda, tenth in succession from Siha, finally wrested control of Mandore and much of Marwar from the Turks with help of the Partiharas. The Jodhpur state was founded in the 13th century by the Rathore clan of Rajputs. The city of Jodhpur, capital of the Rathore state and now a district administrative centre, was founded in 1459 by Rao Chanda's successor Rao Jodha.

In 1561 the kingdom was invaded by the Mughal Emperor Akbar. Parganas of Jaitaran and Merta were captured by Mughals. After a war for almost two decades and the death of Rao Chandrasen Rathore in 1581, Marwar was brought under direct Mughal administration and remained so till its administration was handed over to Raja Udai Singh in 1583.

In 1679 CE, when Maharaja Jaswant Singh whom Emperor Aurangzeb had posted at Jamrud at the mouth of the Khyber Pass, died at that place, leaving no son to succeed him; his widowed Ranis (Queens) at Lahore gave birth to two sons. One died and the other survived to secure the throne of Marwar and to stir up the sentiments of his co-religionists against the Muslim Monarch. The family of the late Raja had left Jamrud without the permission of the emperor and killed an officer at Attock when the officer had asked them about their identity. This was a sufficient ground for incorporating Marwar in the Mughal Empire, or reducing it to a state of dependency under a capable ruler. So the Mughal Emperor Aurangzeb invaded Marwar in 1679. Durgadas Rathore led a rebellion against the Mughals which lasted for 31 years. After the death of Aurangzeb, Durgadas captured Jodhpur and evicted the Mughal garrison from Marwar.

All the Rajput clans united due to the aggressive behaviour of the Mughal emperor. A triple alliance was formed by the states of Jodhpur kingdom, Udaipur (Mewar) and Jaipur Kingdom to become independent from the Mughal Empire.

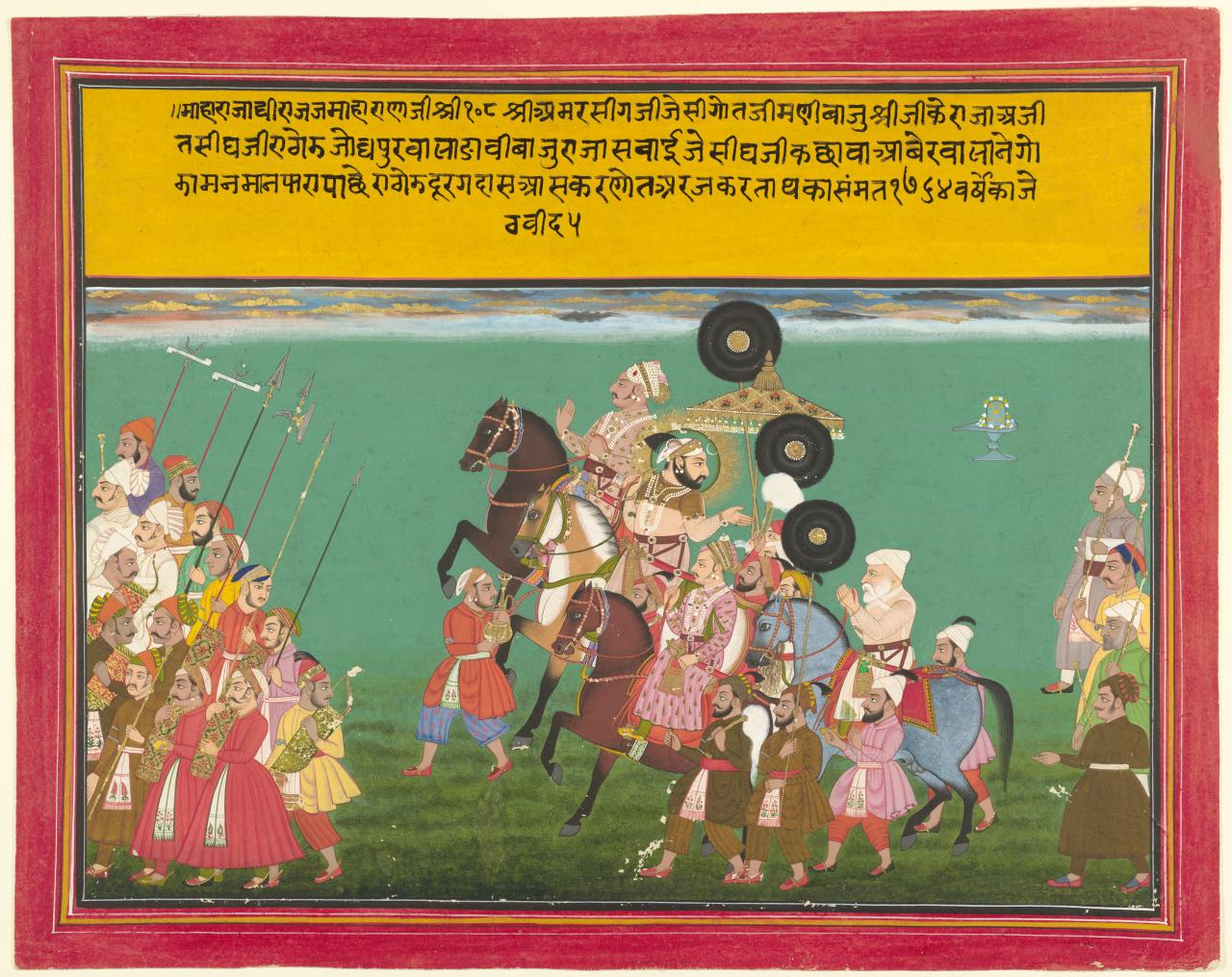
A Mewari painting showing the alliance between Maharaja Ajit Singh of Marwar, Maharana Amar Singh II of Mewar, Maharaja Jai Singh II of Amer and Durgadas Rathore

Internecine disputes and succession wars disturbed the peace of the early years of the century, until in January 1818 Jodhpur was brought under British control. Jodhpur became a princely state of Rathore Clan of Rajputs in the Rajputana Agency of British India.

The state was bounded on the north by Bikaner state, on the northeast by Jaipur state, on the west by the British province of Ajmer, on the southeast by Mewar (Udaipur) state, on the south by Sirohi state and the Banas Kantha Agency of Bombay Presidency, on the southwest by Sind Province, and on the west by Jaisalmer State. The Rathore Maharaja was the head of state, with an aristocracy of Jagirdars, Zamindars and Thakurs. There were 22 parganas and 4500 villages in the state.

In 1843, when Maharaja Man Singh (ruled 1803–1843) died without a son and without having adopted an heir. The nobles and state officials were left to select a successor from the nearest of kin. Their choice fell upon Raja Takht Singh of Ahmednagar. Maharaja Takht Singh, who supported the British during the Revolt of 1857, died in 1873. His successor, Maharaja Jaswant Singh II, who died in 1896, was a very enlightened ruler. His brother, Sir Pratap Singh, conducted the administration until his nephew, Sardar Singh, came of age in 1898. Maharaja Sardar Singh ruled until 1911. The imperial service cavalry formed part of the reserve brigade during the Tirah campaign.

Marwar suffered more severely than any other part of Rajputana from the famine of 1899–1900. In February 1900 more than 110,000 people were in receipt of famine relief. The kingdom had a population of 1,935,565 in 1901, a 23% decline from the 1891, largely due to the results of the famine.

Its ruler, the Maharaja of Jodhpur, expressed a wish to join the Dominion of Pakistan but Lord Mountbatten warned him that his subjects were mostly Hindus and his accession to Pakistan would create problems. As a result, Jodhpur, too, acceded to India.

In 1949 Maharaja Hanwant Singh acceded to the Government of India; in 1950 Rajputana became the state of Rajasthan.

== Marwari horses ==
Marwar is well known across India for its Marwari horse.

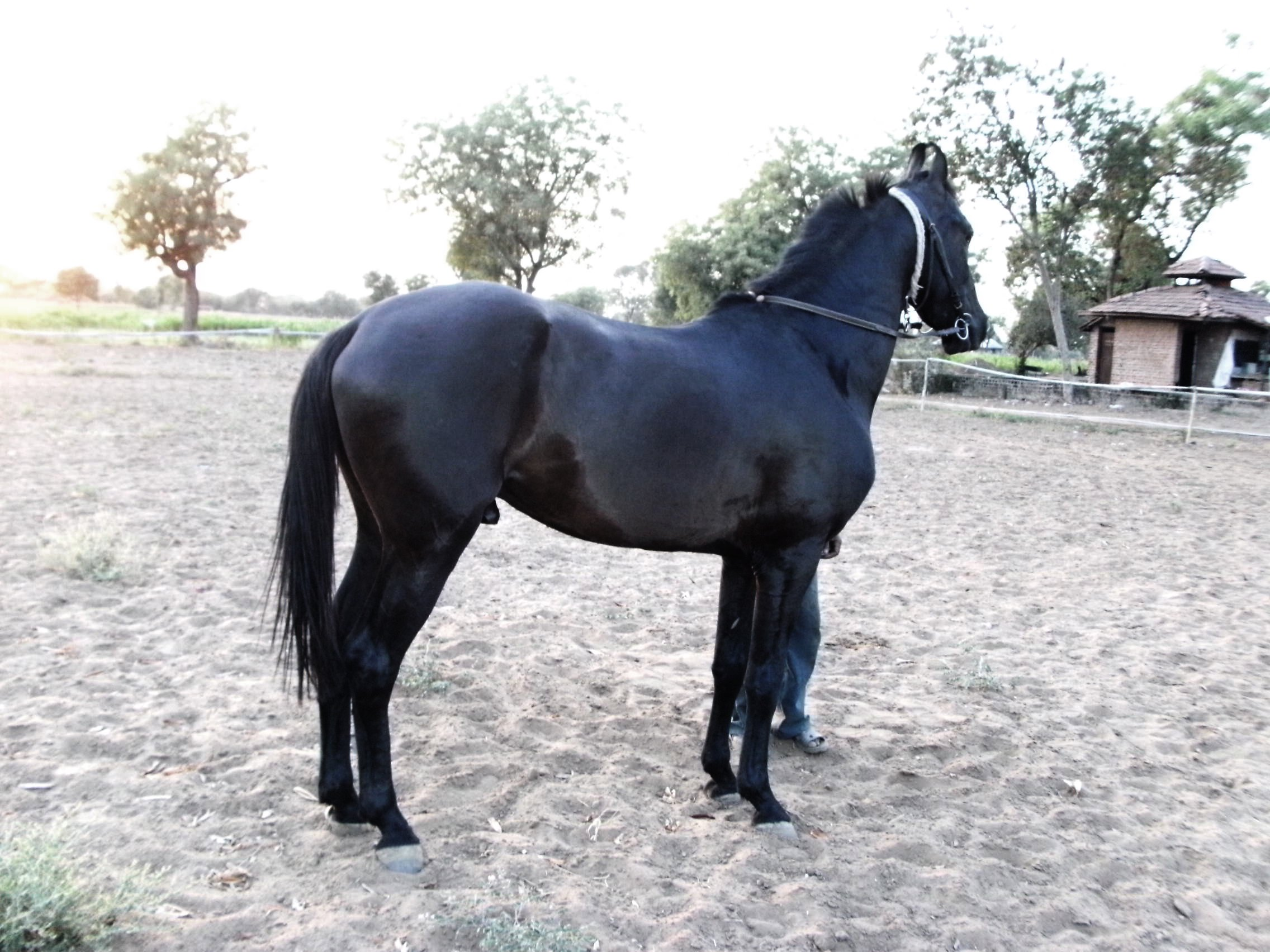
A Marwari Stallion

== See also ==
- Mewar
- Shekhawati
- Bagar
- Dhundhar
- Hadoti
- Vagad
