= Himmat Singh =

Last Maharaja of Idar (1899–1960)

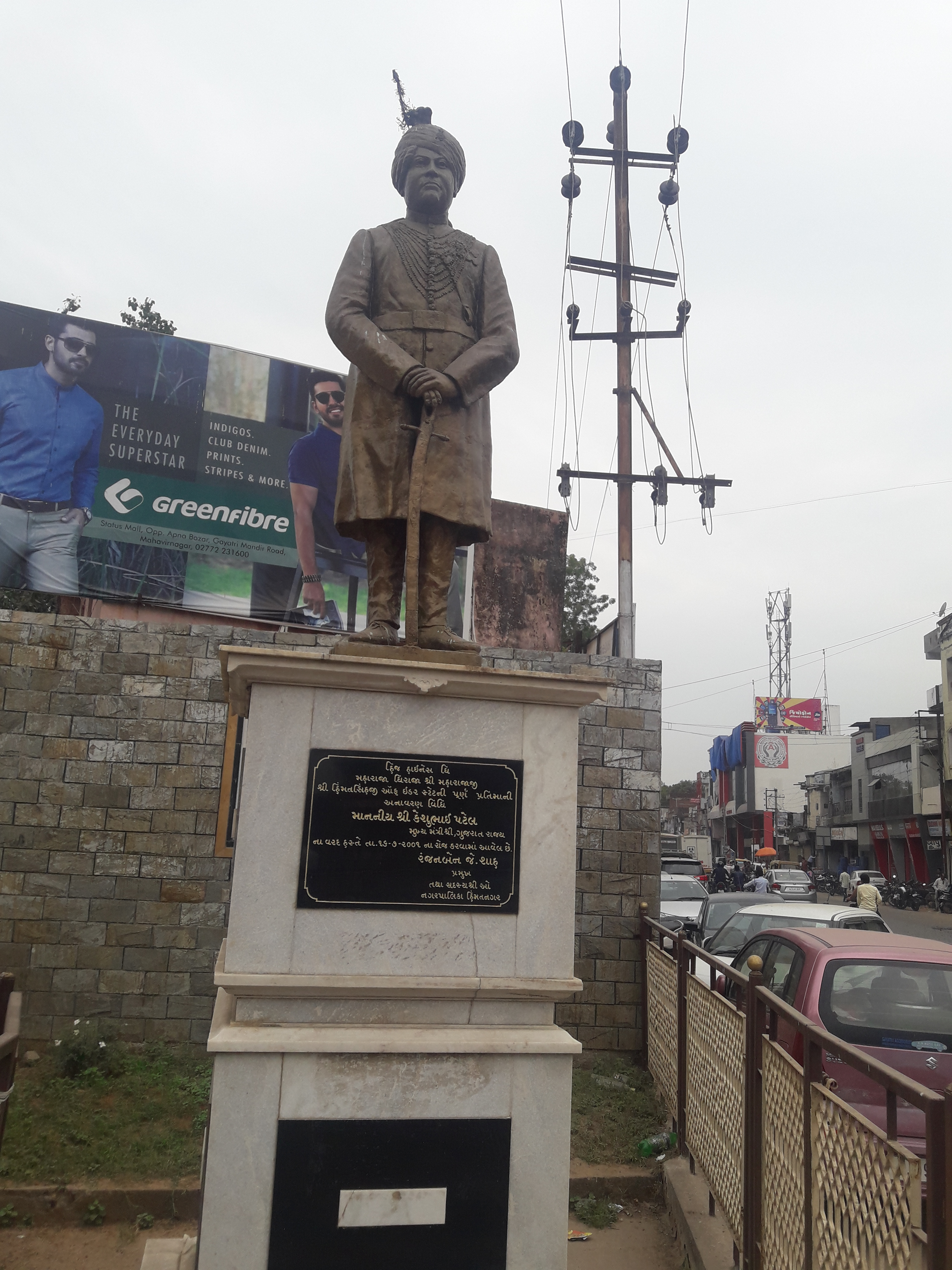
Statue of Himmat Singhji erected in Himatnagar

Maharaja Himmat Singh (2 September 1899 – 24 November 1960) was the last ruler of the princely state of Idar State. He was Maharaja of Idar from 1931 to 1948.

== Birth ==
Himmat Singh was the eldest son of Maharaja Daulat Singh was born on 2 September 1899 at Jodhpur. He was educated at Mayo College at Ajmer.

He attended the Coronation of the King George V and Queen Mary, at Westminster Abbey, in London and served as Page-of-Honour to the King-Emperor at the Delhi Coronation Durbar in 1911.

== Ascension ==
Singh succeeded on the death of his father on 14 April 1931 as Maharaja of Idar State and was installed on the gadi (throne) at Himmatnagar on 11 July 1931. Upon the independence of India, he merged his state in to the Union of India on 10 June 1948.

Singh also held the title of Colonel-in-Chief of Idar Sir Pratap Infantry from 1931 to 1954.

He participated in several sports, including hunting, horse racing, polo, tent-pegging, pig-sticking, cricket, and football.

== Personal life ==
He died on 24 November 1960. Singh had two sons Maharaja Daljit Singh (who succeeded him as Maharaja of Idar) and Maharaj Shri Amar Singhji.

== Memorials ==
The town of Himmatnagar, which served as the capital of Idar State, was renamed after him from Ahmadnagar by his father Daulat Singh in year 1912, who was then the heir-apparent to the throne of Idar.

== Honours ==
- Delhi Durbar Medal - silver (1911)
- King George V Silver Jubilee Medal - 1935
- King George VI Coronation Medal - 1937
- Indian Independence Medal - 1948
- Halvad-Dhrangadhra State Rajyabhisek Medal 1st class - 1942
- Halvad-Dhrangadhra Accession to India Medal - 25 March 1948
