= Takht Singh =

Maharaja of Jodhpur (1819–1873)

- Maharaja of Jodhpur
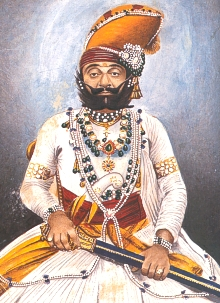
- Portrait of Takht Singh

Ruler of Jodhpur
- Tenure: 4 September 1843 – 13 February 1873
- Predecessor: Man Singh of Marwar
- Successor: Jaswant Singh II
- Born: 6 June 1819
- Died: 13 February 1873 (aged 53)
- Issue: Jaswant Singh II Zorawar Singh Sir Pratap Singh Ranjit Singh Kishore Singh Bahadur Singh Bhupal Singh Madho Singh Muhabbat Singh Zalim Singh Chand Kanwarji m.to HH Maharaja Sawai Ram Singh II of Jaipur Indra Kanwarji m.to HH Maharaja Sawai Ram Singh II of Jaipur Lal Kanwarji m.to HH Maharaja Sawai Ram Singh II of Jaipur Saubhag Kanwarji m.to HH Maharaja Maharao Sir Raghubir Singh of Bundi Samarth Kanwarji m.to HH Maharaja Maharao Sir Raghubir Singh of Bundi
- House: Rathore
- Father: Maharaja Karan Singh of Ahmednagar Himmatnagar in Gujarat
- Mother: Devadiji Saras Kanwarji d.of Maharao Udaibhan Singh II of Sirohi

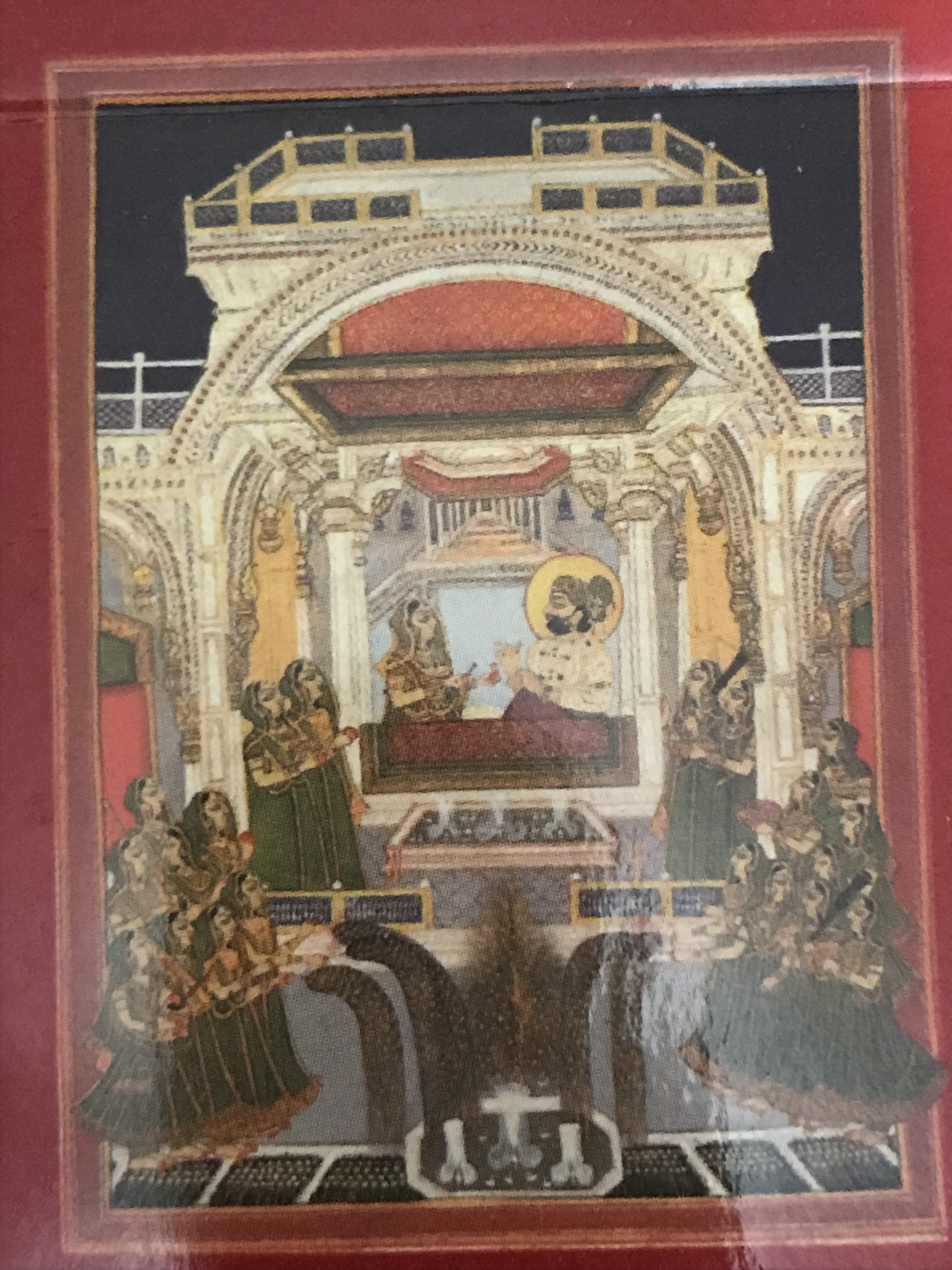
Maharaja Takht Singh celebrating Diwali

Maharaja Takht Singh GCSI (6 June 1819 – 13 February 1873) was first the regent (1839–1841) and the final Maharaja of Ahmednagar (Himmatnagar) 1841–1843 as a result of an agreement with the British. Once he ceded Ahmednagar (Himmatnagar) to Idar, he was recognized as Maharaja of Jodhpur (1843–1873).

He was born in Ahmednagar (Himmatnagar), the second son of Maharaja Karan Singh and grandson of Sangram Singh, the Maharaja of Ahmednagar (Himmatnagar) from 1798 to 1835. He had little prospect of ascending the throne, yet after the death of his elder brother, Maharaja Prithvi Singh in 1839, he became the regent over the whole state and served as such until the birth of his brother's son, Yuvraj Balwant Singh, who was proclaimed ruler at his birth. Takht Singh then became the new ruler's regent and served as such until the untimely death of his nephew on 23 September 1841, when he became the Maharaja of Ahmednagar (Himmatnagar).

However, two years into his reign in 1843, Maharaja Man Singh, the then ruler of the head seat of Rathores i.e Marwar (Jodhpur )died. He was persuaded by his widows to take the succession as he was a member of the Rathore Dynasty through his grandfather, Maharaja Sangram Singh, the Maharaja of Idar, who himself was the son of Maharaja Anand Singh, the first ruler of Idar and a younger son of Maharaja Ajit Singh, Maharaja of Jodhpur, however, he had to cede Ahmednagar (Himmatnagar) back to the state of Idar to be recognized in Jodhpur by the British authorities.

So, on 29 October 1843, he ascended the gadi at the Shringar Chowki in the majestic Mehrangarh Fort. Later in his life, he served the English East India Company at the time of the Indian Rebellion of 1857 and in the year 1862 he received a sanad of adoption.

He married 30 wives. He died in the city of Jodhpur on 13 February 1873 and was cremated at Mandore. He was succeeded by his eldest son Maharaja Jaswant Singh II on the Marwar throne, while his third son, Pratap Singh would go on to become the Maharaja of Idar. His first-born daughter, Baiji Lal Chand Kanwarji, would be married in 1843 to Maharaja Sawai Ram Singh II, the Maharaja of Jaipur(1835-1880) making her the Patrani (chief consort) of the Kachwaha ruler.

Preceded by Maharaja Balwant Singh	Maharaja of Ahmednagar (Himmatnagar); 1841–1843	none, state ceded to Idar
Preceded by Maharaja Man Singh	The Rathore Dynasty; 4 September 1843 – 13 February 1873	Succeeded by Maharaja Jaswant Singh II
