= Idar State =

Former princely state in India

Coordinates: 23°49′48″N 73°00′00″E

Idar State Idar Rajya
- c. 1257–1948
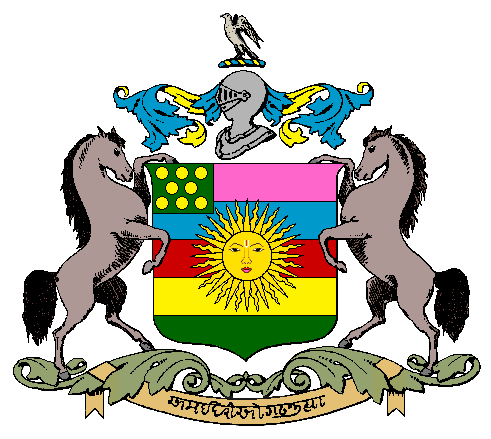
- Coat of arms

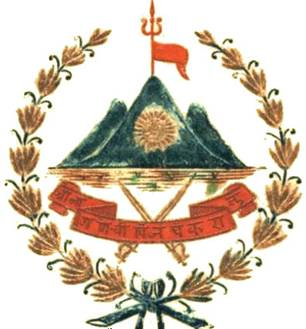
- Emblem
- Status: princely state
- Capital: Idar
- Government: Absolute monarchy
- History
  - Established: c. 1257
  - Rao rule of Idar: 1257–1656
  - Marwar rule of Idar: 1729–1948
  - Accession to the Dominion of India: 10 June 1948
Succeeded by
Dominion of India

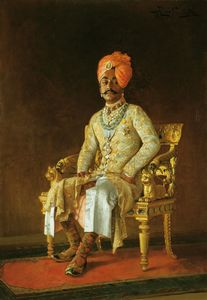
Maharaja Sir Pratap Singh.

Idar State, also known as Edar, was a princely state located in present-day Gujarat state of India. During the British era, it was a part of the Mahi Kantha Agency, within the Gujarat Division of Bombay Presidency.

== History ==
=== Rao Dynasty rule ===
Idar State was a princely state that was founded in 1257 by Rao Sonag. Its rulers of all time were Rathore Rajputs. On the question of the succession of the state of Idar, the Sultan of Gujarat, Muzaffar Shah, and Rana Sanga of Mewar supported rival claimants. In 1520, Sanga established Raimal on the Idar throne, with Muzaffar Shah sending an army to install his ally Bharmal. Sanga himself arrived in Idar and the Sultan's army was beaten back. Rana pursued the Gujarati army and plundered the towns of Ahmadnagar and Visnagar of Gujarat, chasing the Sultan's army as far as Ahmedabad. the Rathore's ruled Idar for 12 generations until they were defeated by the Mughals under Murad Baksh in 1656. Idar then became a part of the Mughal Province of Gujarat.

=== Marwar Dynasty takeover ===
In 1729, Anand Singh and Rai Singh, brothers of the Maharaja of Jodhpur, captured Idar by force. They captured the districts of Idar, Ahmednagar, Morasa, Baad, Harsol, Parantij and Vizapur. Five other districts were made tributaries of their new state. The state was soon annexed by the Marathas under Damaji Gaekwad in 1753 and Anand Singh was killed in battle. When Rai Singh got to know about his brother's death he gathered a force and once again captured Idar; he placed Anand Singh's son on the throne and became his guardian. After Rai Singh's death in 1766, the Marathas once again threatened Idar upon which Rao Seo Sinh, son of Anand Singh, agreed to hand over the districts of Parantij and Vizapur to the Peshwa and Morasa, Baad and Harsol to the Gaekwads.

In 1875, Idar state had a revenue of £60,000 and paid a tribute of £3,034 to the Gaekwads of Baroda State. The population of the state in 1875 was 217,382. The rulers were Rathore Rajputs of the Joda family and were entitled to a gun salute of 15 guns.

In 1924, Idar was made part of the Western India States Agency. It was transferred to the Rajputana Agency in the early 1940s. On 10 June 1948, Idar became part of the Indian Union. In 1949, it was dissolved and split between Sabar Kantha district and Mehsana district, which were at that point in Bombay State. Both districts were included in Gujarat when it was formed in 1960.

=== Rulers of Idar ===
The rulers of Idar were a branch of the Rathore dynasty and thus of the same lineage as the Ruler of Jodhpur. The first Maharaja was the son of Ajit Singh of Jodhpur.

==== Rajas ====
- 1731-1751 Anand Singh ( -1753)
- 1751-1791 Shiv Singh (1736–1791), His second son founded a separate branch of the dynasty, which ruled as Maharajas of Ahmednagar from 1792 until 1843, when Takht Singh, the last Maharaja, became Maharaja of Jodhpur and continued the Ahmednagar line from there.
- 1791-1792 Bhawan Singh (1755–1792)
- 1792-1833 Gambhir Singh (1781-12 August 1833)
- 12 August 1833-26 December 1868 Jawan Singh, KCSI (1830-26 December 1868)
- 26 December 1868-February 1901 Keshri Singh, KCSI (1864-February 1901)
- Interregnum from February–October 1901
- October-30 November 1901 Krishna Singh (October 1901-30 November 1901). A posthumous son of Sir Keshrisinhji, who "ruled" from his birth, eight months after his father's death, to his own death a month later.
- January 1902 - 1902 Pratap Singh, GCB, GCSI, GCVO, LLD (22 October 1845 – 4 September 1922)

==== Maharajas ====
- 1902 - May 1911 Pratap Singh, GCB, GCSI, GCVO, LLD (22 October 1845 – 4 September 1922)
- May 1911-14 April 1931 Daulat Singh, KCSI (12 May 1875 – 14 April 1931)
- 14 April 1931 - 15 August 1947 Himmat Singh, (2 September 1899 – 24 November 1960)

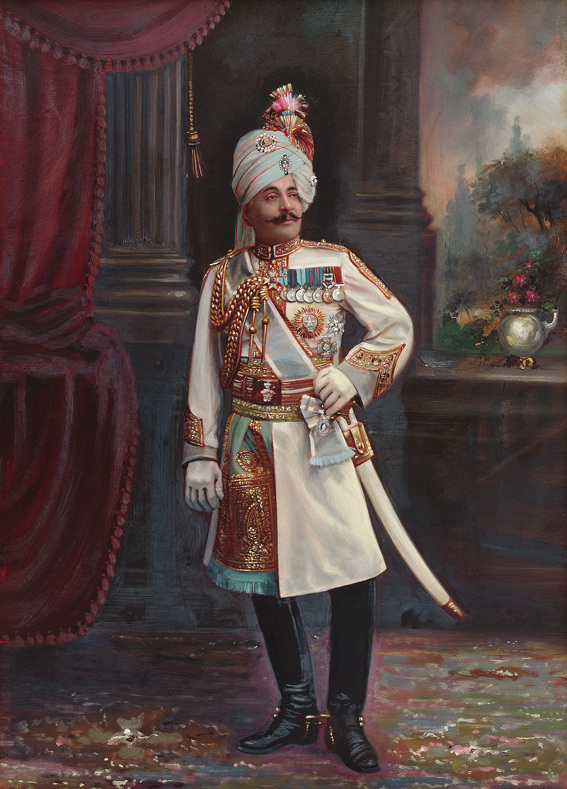
Maharaja Sir Pratap Singh.

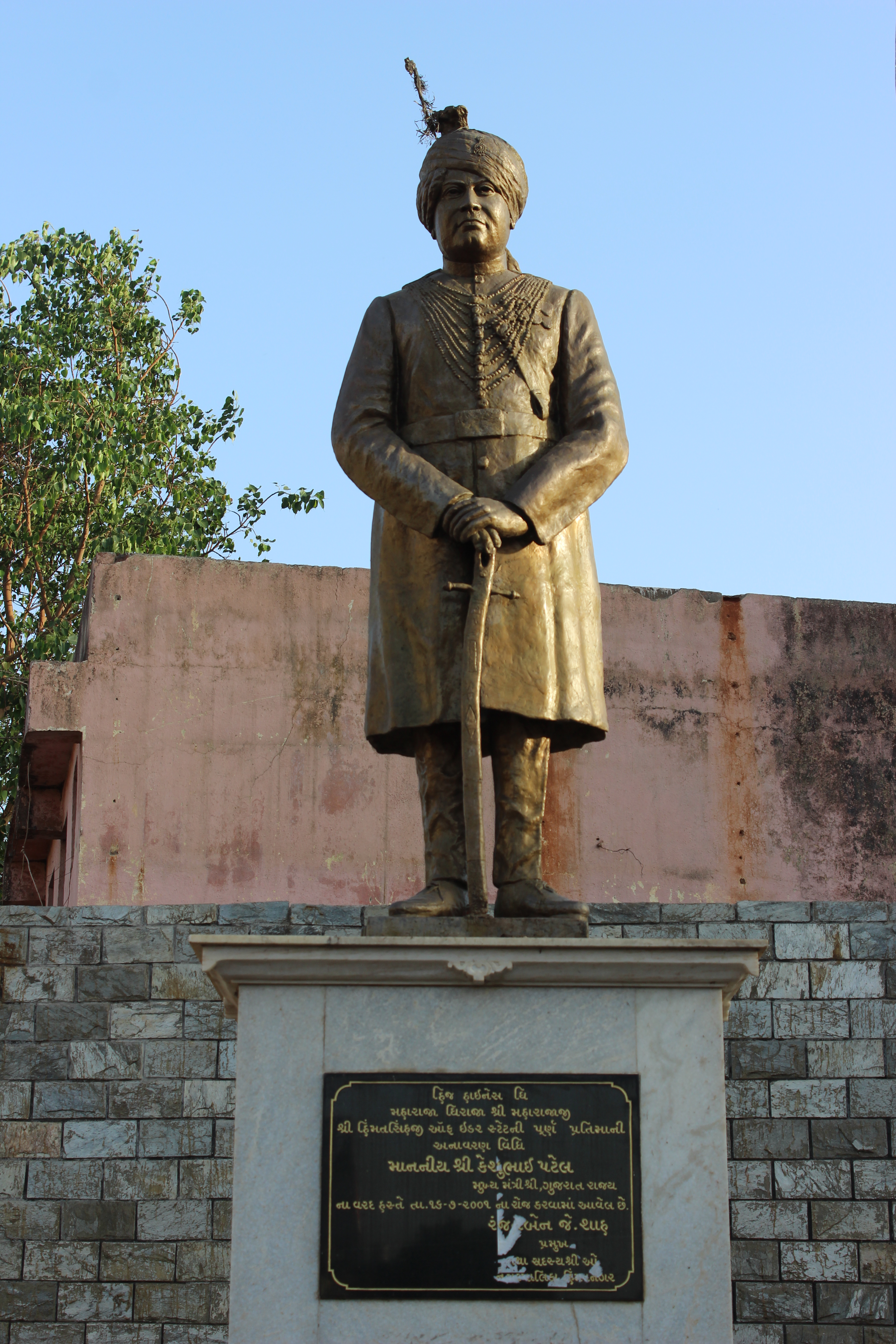
Maharaja Himmat Singh.

==== Post-Independence Maharajas ====
- Daljit Singh (10 July 1917 – 17 May 1992)
- Rajendra Singh (25 September 1938-)

==== Rajas of Ahmadnagar ====
- 1791 - 1798 Sangram Singh
- 1798 - 1835 Karan Singh
- 1835 - 1839 Pratap Singh
- 1839 - 1841 ....
- 1841 - 1843 Takht Singh

==== Rajas of Morasa ====
- 1791 - 1806 Zalim Singh
- 1806 - 1821 Pratap Sing

==== Rajas of Baad ====
- 1791 - 1826 Amir Singh

==== Rajas of Soor ====
- 1791 - Indra Singh

=== Genealogy ===
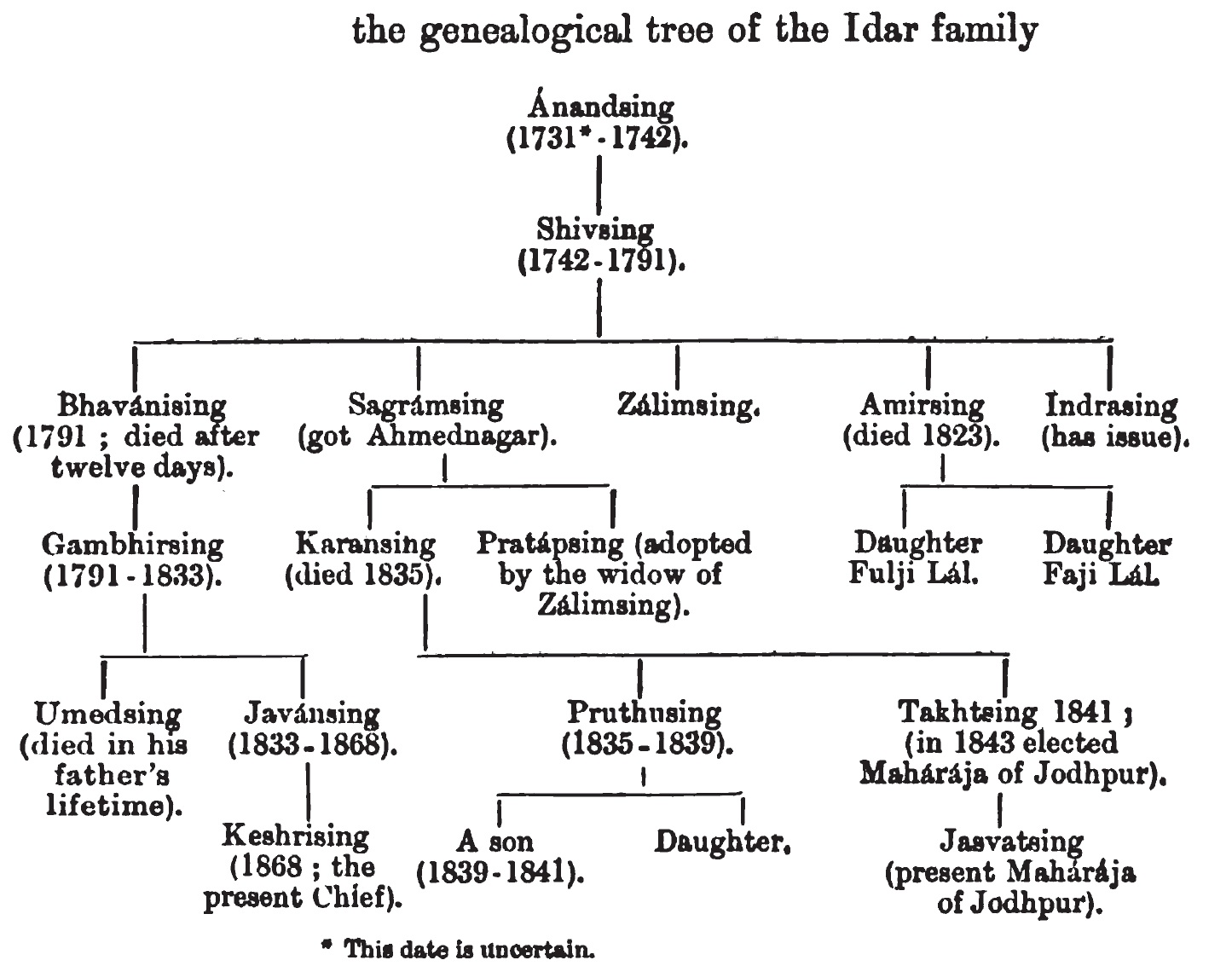
