= Sardar Singh of Jodhpur =

Maharaja of Jodhpur (1880–1911)

Sardar Singh
- Maharaja of Jodhpur
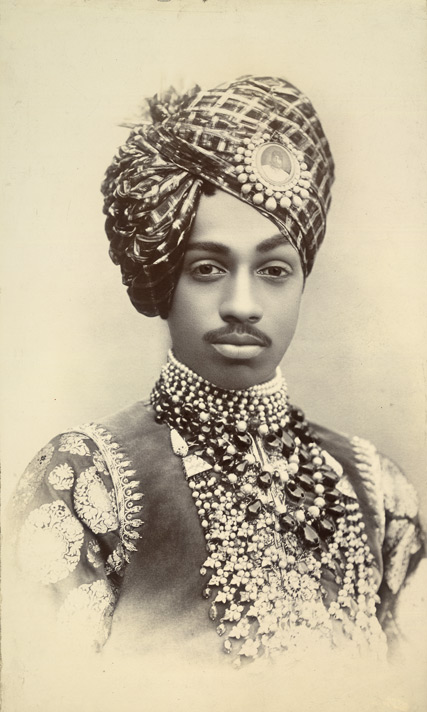
- Sardar Singh c. 1900

Maharaja of Jodhpur
- Tenure: 11 October 1895 – 21 March 1911
- Predecessor: Jaswant Singh II
- Successor: Sumer Singh
- Born: 11 February 1880; Jodhpur, Jodhpur district, Rajasthan, India
- Died: 21 March 1911 (aged 31)
- Spouse: Lakhsman Kanwar of Bundi; Kishor Kanwar of Mewar
- Issue: Sumer Singh (b.1898); Marudhar Kanwar, Maharani of Jaipur (b.1899); Suraj Kanwar, Maharani of Rewa (b.1901); Umaid Singh (b.1903); Ajit Singh (b.1907)
- House: Rathore-Jodhpur
- Father: Maharaja Sir Jaswant Singh II of Jodhpur
- Mother: Maharani Puariji Bijay Kanwar
- Religion: Hinduism

Maharaja Sir Sardar Singh Bahadur GCSI (11 February 1880 – 21 March 1911) was the Maharaja of Jodhpur State from 11 October 1895 till his death on 20 March 1911.

He succeeded his father Maharaja Sir Jaswant Singh II in 1895. He reigned under the Regency of his uncle until he came of age and was invested with full ruling powers, at Mehrangarh, Jodhpur, 18 February 1898. But within a short period of attaining his ruling powers, he began to spend state funds on an extraordinary rate and neglected his duties in favor of pleasure, thereby depleting the state revenues and gradually causing the administration to grind to a near halt. The British Indian officials, eventually intervened in 1903 and deprived him of his ruling powers and ordered him to refrain from interfering in the active work of his ministers and requested that he reside outside the state at Panchmarhi. He had certain restricted powers restored to him and was permitted to return to Jodhpur 8 November 1905. Further powers were restored to him in 1906, with full ruling powers being finally restored in 1908. He was created KCSI in 1908 and GCSI in 1910. He was a noted polo player.

He died on 21 March 1911, and was succeeded by his son Sumer Singh.

Preceded by Maharaja Jaswant Singh II	Rulers of Marwar (Jodhpur); The Rathore Dynasty; 11 October 1895– 20 March 1911	Succeeded by Maharaja Sumer Singh
