= Jaswant Singh II =

Maharaja of Jodhpur (1838–1895)

Jaswant Singh
- Maharaja of Jodhpur
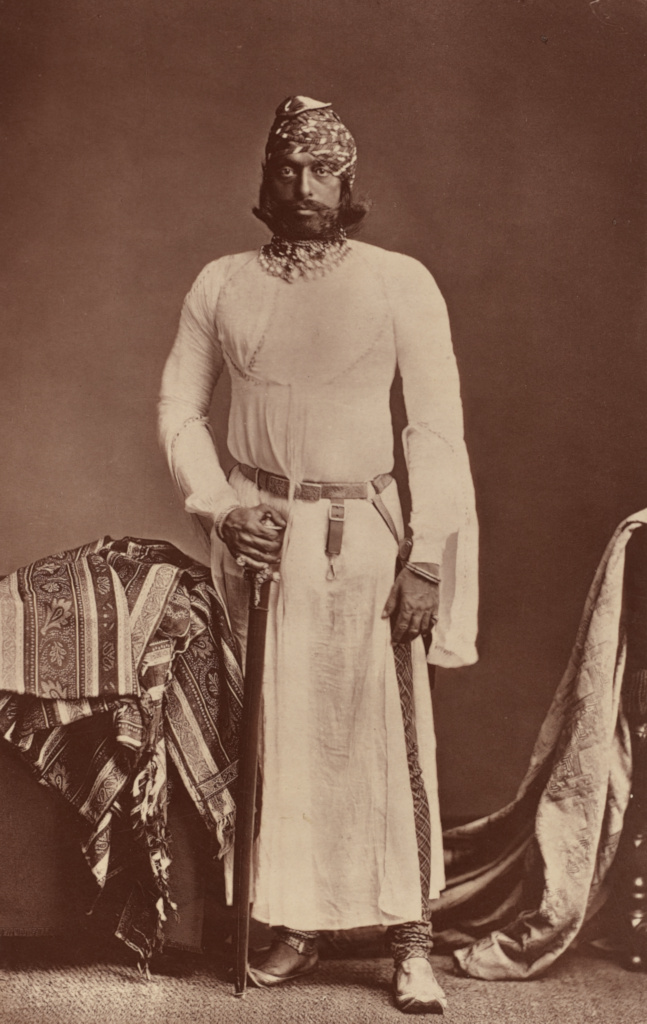
- Portrait by Bourne & Shepherd, 1877

Maharaja of Jodhpur
- Tenure: 4 February 1873 – 11 October 1895
- Predecessor: Takht Singh
- Successor: Sardar Singh
- Born: 6 June 1838; Ahmadnagar(now Himmatnagar), Gujarat, India
- Died: 11 October 1895 (aged 56–57)
- Spouse: Rajba Kanwar; Puariji Bijay Kanwar; Nain Raiji; Guman Kanwar; Roop Kanwar; Anand Kanwar; 8 others
- Issue: Raja Tej Singh; Raja Sawai Singh; Suraj Kanwar; Sardar Singh; Keshari Singh; 5 others
- House: Rathore-Jodhpur
- Father: Maharaja Takht of Jodhpur
- Mother: Maharani Gulab Kanwar, Princess of Sirohi
- Religion: Hinduism

Jaswant Singh II, GCSI, (6 June 1838 – 11 October 1895) was Maharaja of Jodhpur from 4 February 1873 – 11 October 1895.

== Birth ==
He was born in 1838 at Ahmadnagar in Gujarat and was eldest son of Takht Singh and his consort, Maharani Gulab Kanwar, daughter of Maharaja Sheo Singh of Sirohi.

== Marriage ==
He had eight wives, of which the first was the daughter of the Jam Sahib of Nawanagar, Rajba Kanwar. Puariji Bijay Kanwar was his chief consort and mother of Maharaja Sardar Singh.

He also kept concubines, including his favorite Nanhi Jaan, a Muslim court dancer.

== Accession ==
He acceded to the throne of Jodhpur in 1873 upon death of his father, Takht Singh,

== Reign ==
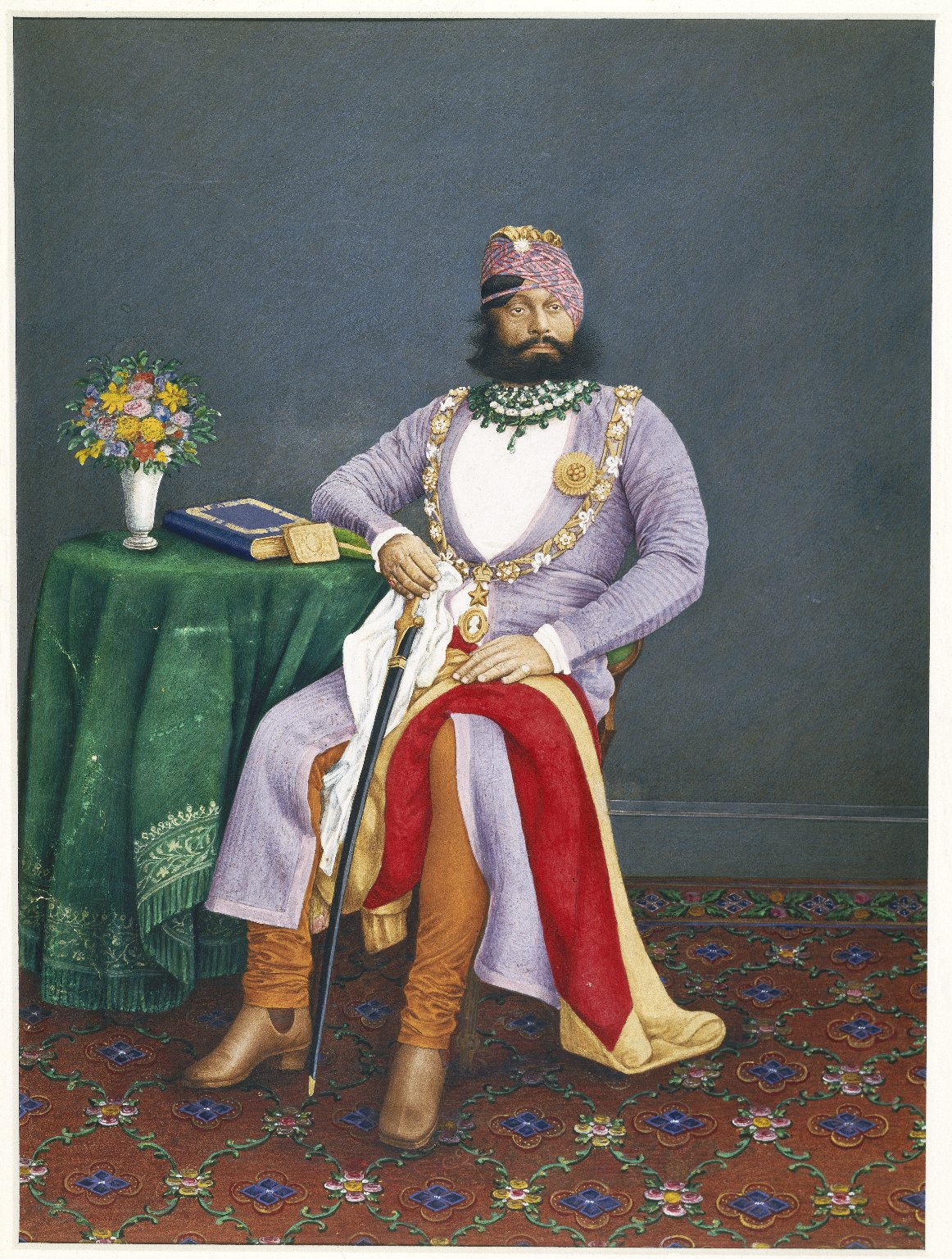
Portrait of Jaswant Singh II c. 1880

The reign of Jaswant Singh II was marked with remarkable prosperity and reforms and development works. He established Courts of Justice, introduced system of revenue settlement and reorganizing all the state departments. Further, he developed infrastructure of the state by introducing telegraphs, railways (Jodhpur State Railway), and developing roads. He formed Imperial Service Cavalry Corps, which later rendered active service in European War. He was honoured and created the Knight Grand Commander of the Most Exalted Order of the Star of India in 1875.

== Swami Dayananda incident ==
Jaswant Singh had invited Swami Dayananda as he was influenced by his ideas. But the tragedy occurred when Dayananda was poisoned on 29 September 1883, when he was the royal guest of Jaswant Singh II, by Dayananda's own cook, who had conspired with a court dancer Nanhi Jaan. The Maharaja was quick to arrange the services of Dr. Surjamal of Jodhpur jail. His treatment relived some symptoms but could not reduce the pain. Maharaja then called Sub Assistant Surgeon Ali Mardan Khan who prescribed high dosage of medicine but Dayananda's condition continued to deteriorate. Ali Mardan Khan subsequently suggested sending Dayananda Saraswati to Mount Abu as the colder climate might help recovery. This advice was reiterated by the Residency Surgeon.

== Death ==
He died 11 October 1895 and was succeeded by his middle son Sardar Singh.

== Jaswant Thada ==
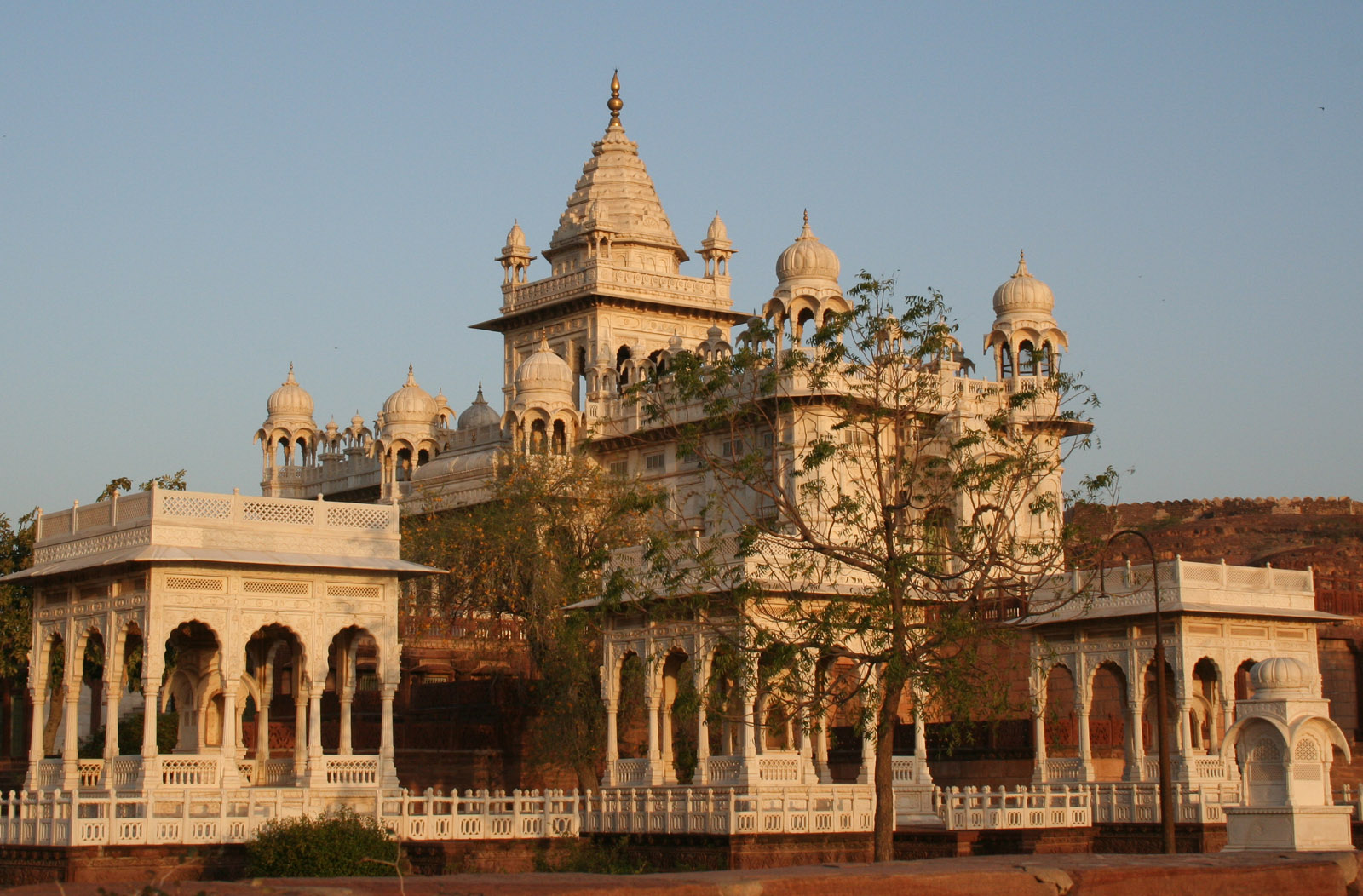
The Jaswant Thada mausoleum in Jodhpur, India

The Jaswant Thada is an architectural landmark located in Jodhpur. It is a white marble memorial built by Sardar Singh in 1899 in memory of Maharaja Jaswant Singh II.

Preceded by Maharaja Takht Singh	Kunwar of Ahmednagar; 1841–1843	none, state ceded to Idar
Preceded by Maharaja Takht Singh	Rulers of Marwar (Jodhpur); The Rathore Dynasty; 4 February 1873– 11 October 1895	Succeeded by Maharaja Sardar Singh
