= Bhurakui =

- town
- Country: India
- State: Gujarat
- District: Anand

Languages
  - Official: Gujarati, Hindi
- Time zone: UTC+5:30 (IST)
- Vehicle registration: GJ
- Website: gujaratindia.com

Bhurakui is a village in Anand district in the Indian State of Gujarat. The town is off the main road connecting Borsad to Tarapur. Nearby towns are Tarapur, Dharmaj, Bochasan, Vadadala. The nearest railway is at Bochasan and the nearest airport is Vadodara Airport.

As of the 2011 Census of India, the population is 2,917, with 1,529 males and 1,388 females.
