= Gana, Anand =

Gana
- Village
- Location in Gujarat, India Gana (India)
- Coordinates: 22°30′23.7″N 72°54′55.8″E
- Country: India
- State: Gujarat
- District: Anand District
- Elevation: 44 m (144 ft)

Population
  - Total: 3,569

Languages
  - Official: Gujarati
- Time zone: UTC+5:30 (IST)
- PIN: 388345
- Telephone code: 02692
- Vehicle registration: GJ
- Nearest cities: Vans Khiliya, Meghva, Napa Talpad, Khandhali, Boriya and Napa Vanto, Karamsad, New Vallabh Vidyanagar
- Climate: Dry almost (Köppen)

Gana is a village in the Anand district of the state of Gujarat in India. It is surrounded by the Anand, Sojitra, Borsad and Nadiad Tehsil.
