= Sahota =

Caste in Punjab region of the Indian subcontinent

Sahota (also known as Sihota or Sahotey) is a Jat clan native to the Punjab and hilly regions of India and Pakistan. as well as Jalandhar district of Punjab. During the early 16th century, in the southern region of Doaba, five brothers from the Sahota clan founded and established the village Kuleta (presently known as Bara Pind) alongside villages such as Dhuleta, Rurka Khurd, and Atta.

== See also ==
- Sahotas
- Sutradhar (caste)
