= Lal Sinh Vadodia =

Indian politician

MP of Rajya Sabha for Gujarat
- In office 10 April 2014 – 9 April 2020
- Succeeded by: Narhari Amin
- Constituency: Gujarat

Member of Gujarat Legislative Assembly
- In office 2007–2012
- Preceded by: Vishnubhai Patel
- Succeeded by: Jayant Patel
- Constituency: Umreth

Personal details
- Party: Bhartiya Janata Party

Lal Sinh Vadodia is politician of Bharatiya Janata Party and member of Rajya Sabha from Gujarat state for the term 2014–2020. He resides at Umreth, Anand district, Gujarat.
