= Dedarda =

Dedarda may refer to the following places in Gujarat, western India :

- a village of Borsad Taluka, in Anand district
- a village of Kheda Taluka, in Kheda District
- Dedarda State, a former princely state, comprising apparently a third town, in Kathiawar's prant Gohelwar
