= Vipulkumar Patel =

Indian politician

Vipulkumar Vinubhai Patel (born 1969) is an Indian politician from Gujarat. He is a former member of the Gujarat Legislative Assembly from Sojitra Assembly Constituency in Anand District. He was elected in the 2022 Gujarat Legislative Assembly election representing the Bharatiya Janata Party.

== Early life and education ==
Patel is from Sojitra, Anand district, Gujarat. He is the son of Vinubhai Shivbhai Patel. He studied Class 12 at BB Patel High School, Dabhoi and passed the examinations in 1988. He later, discontinued his studies.

== Career ==
Patel was first elected as an MLA from Sojitra Assembly constituency representing the Bharatiya Janata Party in the 2022 Gujarat Legislative Assembly election. He polled 87,300 votes and defeated his nearest rival and two time sitting MLA, Poonambhai Madhabhai Parmar of the Indian National Congress, by a margin of 29,519 votes. Earlier in the 2017 Gujarat Legislative Assembly election, he lost to the same candidate, Poonambhai Madhabhai Parmar of the Congress Party, by a margin of 2,246 votes. In 2017, Patel polled votes 69,639 votes against 71,885 votes to Parmar. He first contested the Sojitra seat in the 2012 Gujarat Legislative Assembly election and lost to the same Congress candidate Parmar.
