= Kasor =

- village
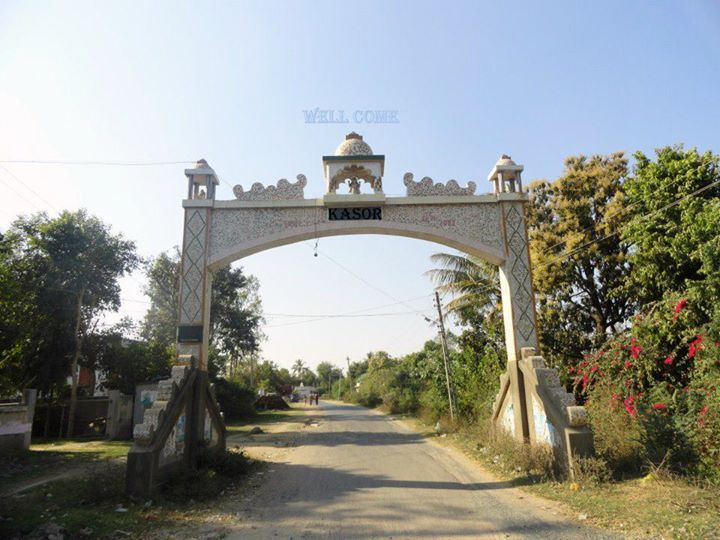
- Kasor Gate

- Location in Gujarat, India Kasor (India)
- Coordinates: 22.550240°N 72.774434°E
- Country: India
- State: Gujarat
- Region: Charotar
- District: Anand
- Talukas: Sojitra

Population (2015)
  - Total: Approx. 22,000

Languages
  - Official: Gujarati,
- Time zone: UTC+5:30 (IST)
- PIN: 388461
- Telephone code: 02697
- Vehicle registration: GJ 23

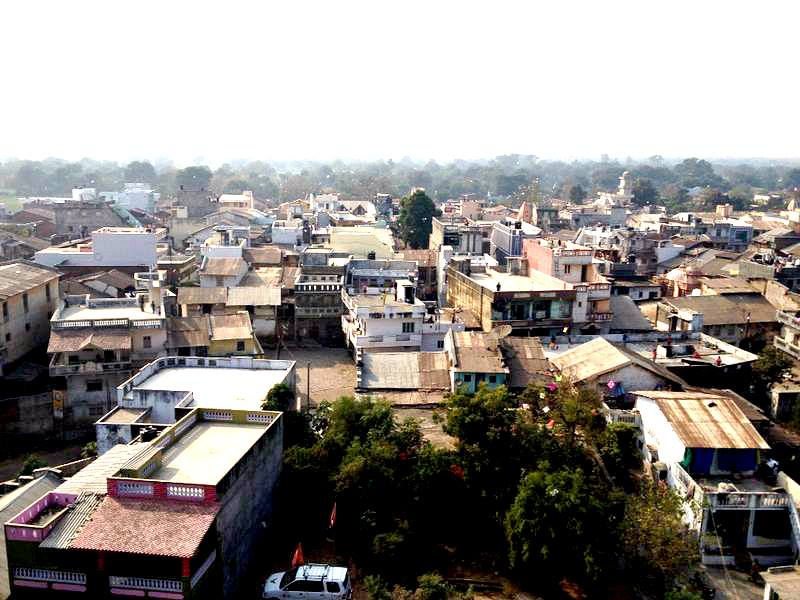
Water Tank View of Kasor 2

Kasor is a village in Sojitra Taluka and Anand District, in Gujarat, India. The village has an entrance from the State Highway 83 (Anand – Sojitra) in Gujarat. Entrance Gate of Kasor came off the highway just after 2.5 km drive. The 400 K.V.SS Power Station is considered as being in this village.

The village population is around 22,000.

== Education ==
Government Granted Schools

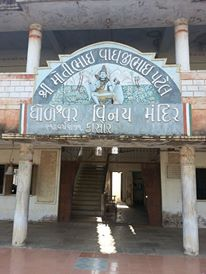
Kasor High School (MVPDVMK)

- Bal Mandir (kindergarten)
- Kumar Shala (Boys Primary School)
- Kanya Shala (Girls Primary School)
- Shri Motibhai Vaghjibhai Patel Dholeshwar Vinay Mandir Kasor (High School)

== Communities ==
Kasor has highest population of (Kshatriya) community while Patel considered as second highest population. Kasor is the only village that has two sub-Leva Patel community (21 Gam Patidar and 22 Gam Patidar) living together. Brahmons, Jain, Tailor, Muslim, Prajapati (Kumbhar), RABARI. /Vaghela, Valmiki community can be also found in the village.

== Economy ==
Agriculture is the main activity in this village. Tobacco, rice, bajra, (millet) corn, wheat, and vegetable farming are also done here. Kasor is also famous for Dairy Farming, almost 75% families have cows and buffaloes, and they earn daily income from dairy farming. In one survey of AMUL, Kasor was highest milk collection village from Anand District.

== Temples (Mandir) ==
=== Dholeswar Mahadev ===
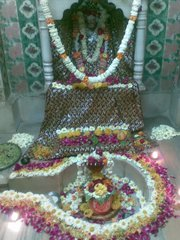
Dholeshwar Mahadev Temple

The village has a famous temple of Lord Shiva “Dholeswar Mahadev” located in center of the village. The temple is very big and well known among many people. During the “Shraavana” (Holy Month in Hindu religion) and Mahashivratri festivals are celebrated widely in this temple. During the whole Shravana month and other festivals, many people come to the temple and take blessings from the lord. On the last Monday of Shravana month, a village fair is organised near the temple area called “Mota Bajar”. And at the end of that day Lord Shiva starts to visit the whole village in “Palaki” with priests.

=== Meladi Maa Mandir ===
The temple of Goddess "Meladi Maa" is located in Rabari Vas. On every Sunday huge crowds came to visit this temple. Some people also came from big cities like Ahmedabad, Baroda and Nadiad.

=== Ramji Mandir ===
The Temple of Lord Ram with Sita and Lakshman, Jalaram, Ambe Maa & Gayatri Maa, located at the entrance of Darvawaja Street. Festivals like Navaratri, Janmashtami, Jalaram Jayanti and Swaminarayan Jayanti celebrate with joy and happiness here.

=== Fulbai Mataji Mandir ===
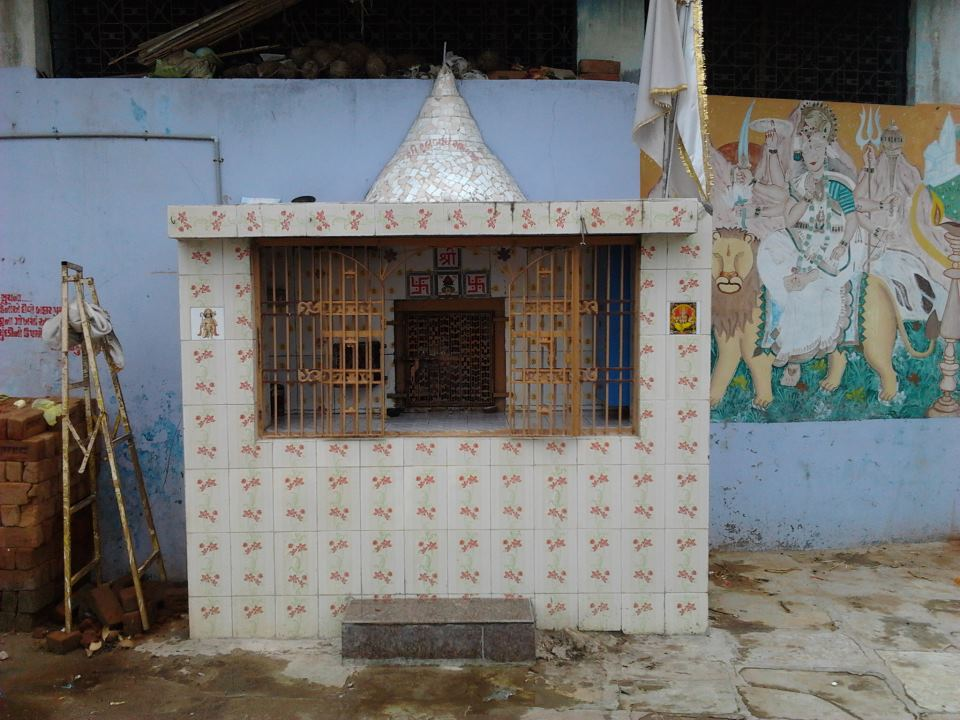
Fulbai Mataji Temple

The temple of the Goddess "Fulbai Mataji" located at the triangle of three streets Undu Faliyu, Lambu Fadiyu and Hathi-Mukhi ni Khadki, local people called this area as “Otlo”. Temple is small but most resident people believe in this Goddess and considered in Clan Goddess. Navaratri and Ganesh Chaturthy are most enjoyable festivals here. It organizes in front of the temple.

=== Bahuchar Maa Mandir ===
The temple of Goddess “Bahuchar Maa” located on the outskirts of Kasor. “Bahuchar Maa” is the “Clan Goddess” of Sardar Patel Street people. They visit the temple once in a day even though temple far away from village & every Amas they will organize a "Bahuchar Maa No Anand Garbo".

Other famous temples in Kasor

Swaminarayan Temple, Kalka Maa Temple, Hadakbai Mata Temple, Harsad Bhavani Maa Temple, Ramdev Pir Maharaj Temple, Shikotar Mata Temple, Zopada Maharaj temple, Bhathiji Mandir, Baliyadev Temple

=== Gayatri Mandir ===
The temple of Goddess "Gayatri Maa" located near Vankar Vaas. There is a "Baal Mandir" for small Kids and "Baba Saheb Ambedkar Library" Near Gayatri Temple. Peoples are came here and get bless from Maa Gayatri. Near this place there is a small Garden who known as "Visaamo". Statue of Mahatma Gandhi and Dr. Baba Saheb Ambedkar is located in this Garden.

== Transport ==
- By Road: Kasor is 9 km from Sojitra and 23 km from Anand.
- By Rail: Nearest railway station is in Petlad, Nadiad and Anand which is 10 km 21 km & 23 km respectively from Kasor.
- By Air: Nearest airport is in Ahmedabad which is 105 km from Kasor.
