= Hargovinddas Kantawala =

Gujarati-language writer from India

Rao Bahadur Hargovinddas Kantawala
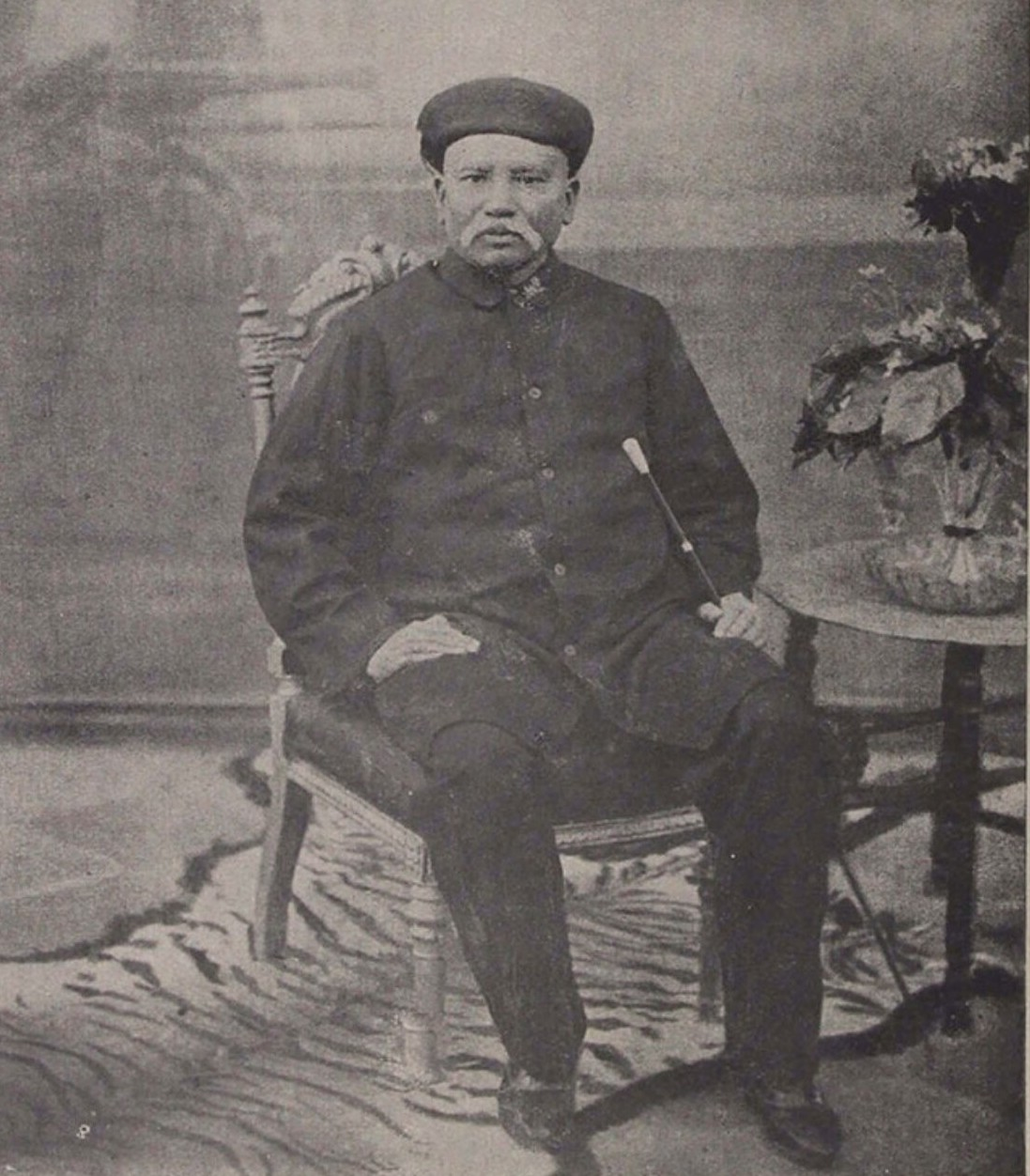
- Hargovinddas Dwarkadas Kantawala
- Born: 16 July 1844; Umreth, Kaira district, Gujarat, British India
- Died: 31 March 1930 (aged 85)
- Occupations: Writer, editor and researcher
- Writing career
- Language: Gujarati

Rao Bahadur Hargovinddas Dwarkadas Kantawala (16 July 1844 – 31 March 1930) was an Indian Gujarati language writer, editor and researcher from British India. He is known for his research and editing works on medieval Gujarati literature. He was the president of the sixth session of the Gujarati Sahitya Parishad.

== Biography ==
Hargovinddas Kantawala was born on 16 July 1844 in Umreth, a town in Anand district (now Anand) of Gujarat, British India. He started his career as a teacher, and then became headmaster. He later became clerk in a collector's office. He was appointed assistant deputy educational inspector, and then principal of the Teacher's Training College, Rajkot. He worked as the dewan (minister) of the principality of Lunavada State in 1905. In 1912, he started a textile mill.

Kantawala was awarded the title of Rao Bahadur by the government in 1903. He was awarded Sahityamartand by Sayajirao Gaekwad III, Maharaja of Baroda State. He defeated Mahatma Gandhi in the 1919 Gujarati Sahitya Parishad election for the position of president, and presided over the sixth session of the Parishad.

He died on 31 March 1930. His son Matubhai Kantawala (1880–1933) was also a writer.

== Works ==
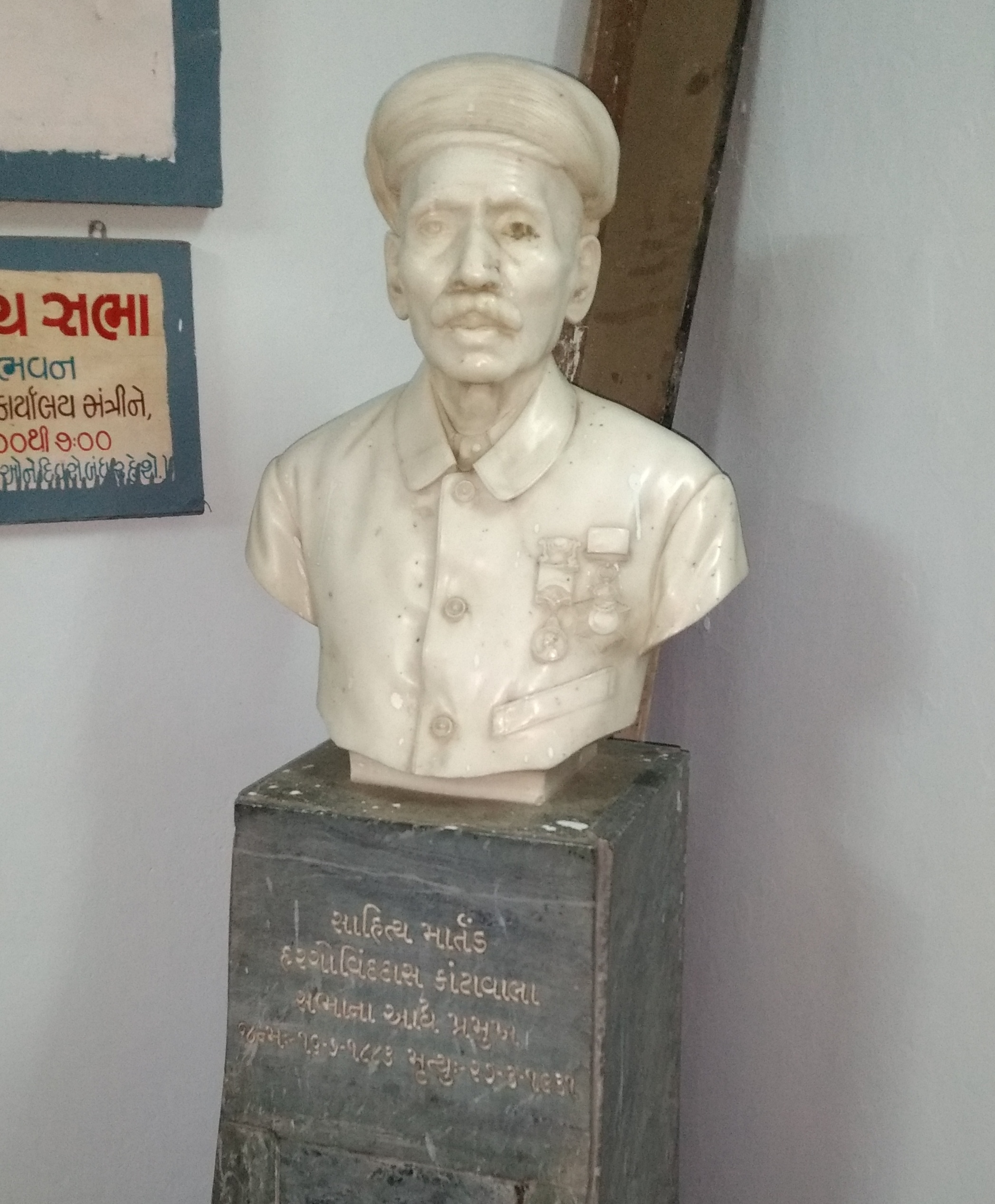
Bust of Kantawala at Premanand Sahitya Sabha, Vadodara

Kantawala is known for his research and editing works on medieval Gujarati literature. Between 1849 and 1894, he, along with Nathashankar Shastri and Chhotalal Narbheram Bhatt, collected and edited poems of medieval Gujarati poets, and published them in 75 collections.

He wrote two novels: Andheri Nagarino Gardhavasen (1881) and Be Baheno athava Ek Gharsansari Varta (Two Sisters or A Tale of a Family Life; 1898).

He wrote a poem titled "Panipat" or "Kurukshetra" (1867), which gives an account of the six battles fought on the battlefield of Panipat and forecasts the seventh battle between Superstition and Reform that is to be fought there. Critic Mansukhlal Jhaveri noted that the poem's language is 'unpolished' and 'vulgar' at places, and the style is 'crude', yet 'forceful'. His other poetical work is Vishwa Ni Vichitrata (Strange Things of Universe; 1913).

In addition, he extensively wrote about social problems, social reforms, moral issues, worldly duties, and promotion of indigenous crafts.

== See also ==
- List of Gujarati-language writers
