= Vadeli =

- Village
- Location in Gujarat, India Vadeli (India)
- Coordinates: 22.21°N 72.51°E
- Country: India
- State: Gujarat
- District: Anand
- Taluka: Borsad

Government
  - Type: Gram Panchayat

Population (2008)
  - Total: 5,000

Languages
  - Official: Gujarati, Hindi, English
- Time zone: UTC+5:30 (IST)
- PIN: 388590
- Telephone code: 02696-285
- Vehicle registration: GJ 23
- Lok Sabha constituency: Anand
- Vidhan Sabha constituency: Borsad
- Sarpanch Name: Harshadbhai Solanki
- Sarpanch Period: 2016-17
- Religion: Hinduism
- Add or Edtting By: Vijay Patel/Sanjay Patel
- Website: gujaratindia.com

Vadeli is a small village in Borsad taluka, Anand district, Gujarat, India. It is located around 8 km from Borsad. It is surrounded by the fertile Charotar region which largely produces tobacco, rice, cotton, lady finger, Tomato, Potato and other agricultural crops. PATEL owns the majority of business, majority of Patels are from 60 house community that dominates Amul Sahkari Madali Milk Dairy and Patel bazar. Other major communities are Darbar, Thakor, Brahmins and Christians. Gandhiji passed through Vadeli Patiya in Dandi March satyagrah, Borsad satyagraha.

== Geography and climate ==
Vadeli is located at 22° 21′ 33.48″ N, 72° 54′ 1.8″ E. The total area of Vadeli is around 0 square kilometres (0 sq mi). The village is located on the fertile plains of Mahi river, 10 km (6 mi) north of mouth of Mahi river where it meets Gulf of Khambhat.

There are three main seasons: Summer, Monsoon and Winter. Aside from the monsoon season, the climate is dry. The weather is hot through the months of March to July — the average summer maximum is 36 °C (97 °F), and the average minimum is 23 °C (73 °F). From November to February, the average maximum temperature is 30 °C (85 °F), the average minimum is 15 °C (59 °F), and the climate is extremely dry. Cold northerly winds are responsible for a mild chill in January. The southwest monsoon brings a humid climate from mid-June to mid-September. The average rainfall is 93 cm (36.7 inches), but infrequent heavy torrential rains cause the river to flood.

Month	Daily Minimum (C)	Daily Maximum (C)	Ave. total Rainfall (mm)	Ave. # of Rainy days
Jan	11.7	28.4	2.6	0.3
Feb	13.8	31.3	1.1	0.2
Mar	18.8	36.0	1.0	0.1
Apr				
May				
Jun				
Jul				
Aug				
Sept				
Oct				
Nov				
Dec				

== Economy ==
The main economy of this village is agriculture. The main cash crop is tobacco, and tobacco processing is an important industry. The other crops with considerable area are bananas, rice, bajra and cotton to some extent.

== Education ==
Vadeli have small Primary School up to 7 standard but nearest village of Bhadran has educational institutions for the development of children at every level. There are both free and paid schools, with all types of facilities for education from kindergarten to graduation. These include boys' and girls' separate schools at the primary level, Tulsibhai Bakorbhai Amin High School, Science and Commerce College, Computer Centre, English Medium School from Nursery to H.S.C. classes, Gymnasium Centre and Jethabhai Narayanbhai Patels, and the Shambhuprasad Boarding House for students from out of town.
