= Govindbhai Parmar =

Indian politician

Member of Gujarat Legislative Assembly
- In office 2017–2026
- Preceded by: Jayantbhai Patel Boskey
- Succeeded by: Harshad Parmar
- Constituency: Umreth

Personal details
- Born: Govindbhai Raijinhai Parmar; 1 January 1943
- Died: March 6, 2026 (aged 83) Anand, Gujarat
- Party: Bharatiya Janata Party

Govindbhai Parmar (1943 – 6 March 2026) was an Indian politician from Gujarat. He was a member of the Gujarat Legislative Assembly from Umreth Assembly constituency in Anand district. He won the 2022 Gujarat Legislative Assembly election representing the Bharatiya Janata Party.

== Early life and education ==
Parmar was from Umreth, Anand district, Gujarat. He is the son of Raijibhai Jalabhai Parmar. He studied Class 7 at Chikhodra Kumar School in 1969 and later discontinued his studies.

== Career ==
Parmar won from Umreth Assembly constituency representing the Bharatiya Janata Party in the 2022 Gujarat Legislative Assembly election. He polled 95,639 votes and defeated his nearest rival and two time sitting MLA, Jayant Patel of Nationalist Congress Party, by a margin of 26,717 votes. He first became an MLA winning the 2017 Gujarat Legislative Assembly election defeating Kapilaben Gopalsinh Chavda of the Indian National Congress by a margin of 1,883 votes.

== Death ==
Parmar died at a private hospital in Anand after a prolonged illness on 6 March 2026. He was succeeded by his son Harshad who won bypoll from the Umreth constituency in April 2026.
