= Lunej =

- Village
- Interactive map of Lunej
- Coordinates: 22°21′07″N 72°34′12″E
- Country: India
- State: Gujarat
- District: Anand
- Taluka: Khambhat

Government

Lunej is a village in Khambhat taluka of Anand district, Gujarat, India. The main occupation of the people of Lunej village is agriculture, farming and animal husbandry. The first oil well in Gujarat was founded in Lunej.
