= Isnav =

- village
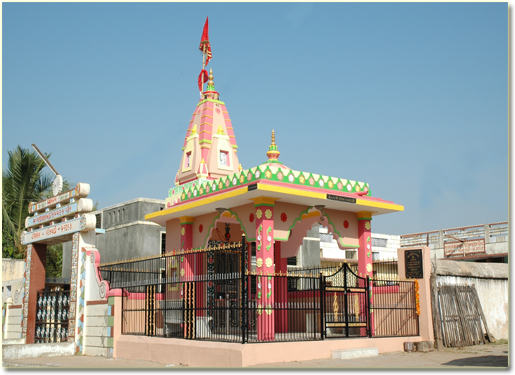
- Vehrai Maa Temple, Isnav

- Location in Gujarat, India
- Coordinates: 22.5334°N 72.7647°E
- Country: India
- State: Gujarat
- Region: Charotar
- District: Anand
- Talukas: Sojitra

Area
  - Total: 8 km^{2} (3.1 sq mi)

Population (2011)
  - Total: Approx. 6,000
  - Density: 500/km^{2} (1,300/sq mi)

Languages
  - Official: Gujarati, Hindi
- Time zone: UTC+5:30 (IST)
- PIN: 388460
- Telephone code: 02697
- Vehicle registration: GJ 23

Isnav is a small village in Anand district, Gujarat, India, near the town of Sojitra.

The village has a well-known temple of the goddess Shree Fulbai Maa at the side of a lake in the entrance to the village. There is also a temple of the ancient Goddess Shree Vehrai Maa, who is the Country Mother for the residents of the village.

Isnav is one of the 26 villages/ghaams that have formed the 22 Gam Patidar Samaj also known as nani Satyavis (27).

== Temples (Mandir) ==
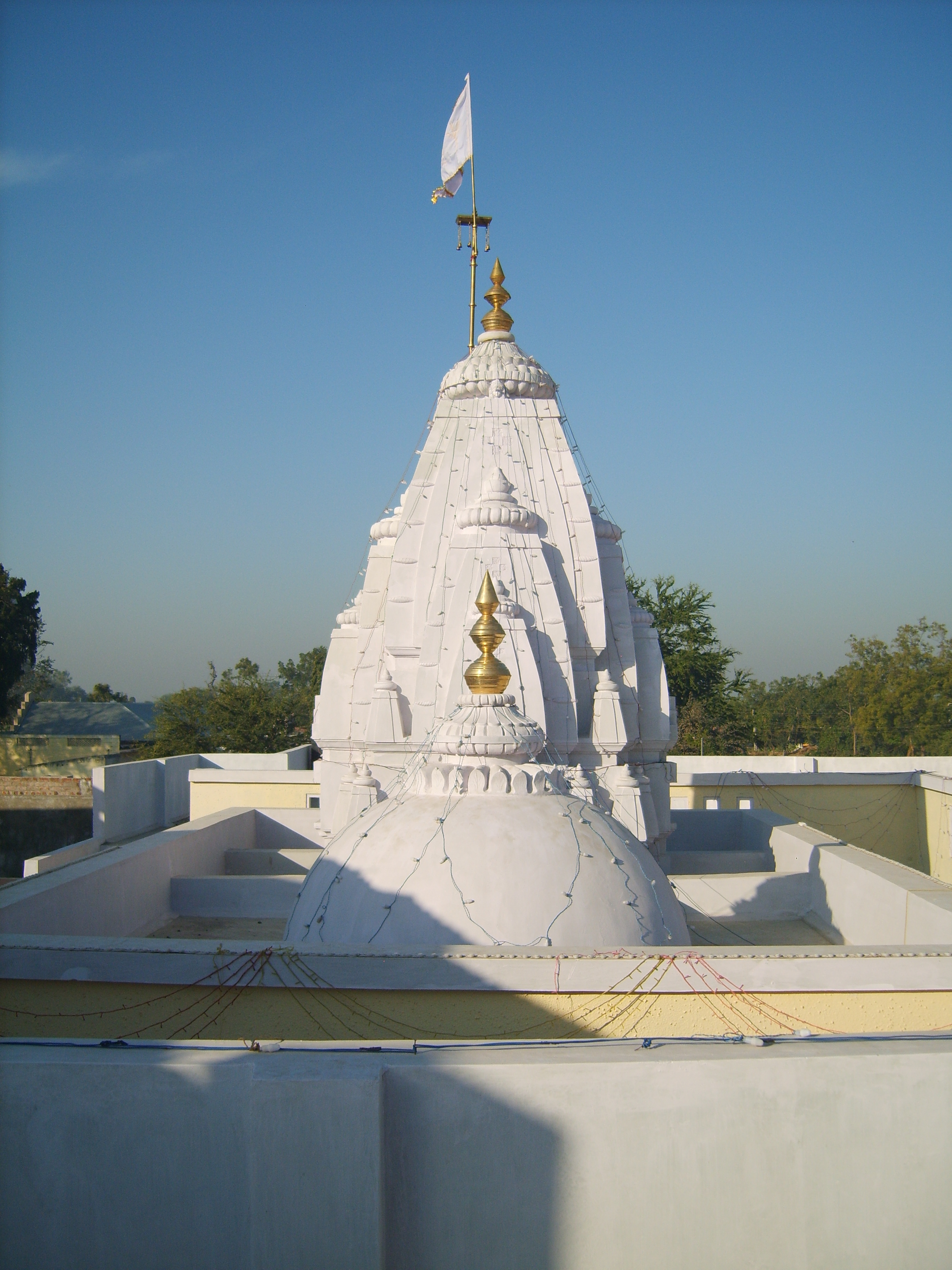
Nilkant Mahaev

- Shri Fulbai Mata Temple (temple of the Goddess "Fulbai Mataji")
- Shri Vehrai Mata Temple
- Shri Bhidbhanjan Hanuman Temple, Harmanpura
- Shri BAPS Swaminarayan Temple (built in 1992)
- Neelkanth Mahadev
- Shri Swaminarayan Mandir (Vadtal Vasi) (under renovation since April 2017)
- Shri Swaminarayan Mandir (Women only)
- Shree Mahakali Mataji Mandir
- Shri Bhatiji Maharaj Mandir
- Shri Badiyadev Maharaj Mandir
- Shree Vehrai Maa Mandir (Vasanda)(N/r Mahadev Street)
- Shri Hanuman Mandir (N/r Bordi Street)
- Shree Hadakdevi Maa Mandir (Vagri Vas)
