= Vatadra =

Vatadra Vatadara
- Village
- Location in Gujarat, India Vatadra (India)
- Coordinates: 22°20′26″N 72°45′05″E
- Country: India
- State: Gujarat
- District: Anand
- Time zone: UTC+05:30 (IST)
- Pincode: 388580
- Vehicle registration: GJ

Vatadra (Vatadara) is one of the larger villages of Cambay county (Khambhat Taluka or subdistrict) of Anand district in Gujarat state (India). It is a gram panchayat village. Because of its size, it is the only village in its gram panchayat. Prior to 1997, it was located in Kaira District (Kheda District).

Close to 10,000 people live in Vatadara. It is revered by Hindus because of its many temples, such as Ramji Temple, BAPS Swaminarayan temple, Vishnu mandir and Nityanand ashram. It is a full facility village, including an office of the Bank of Baroda. It is the home of people of many castes.
