= Ghunteli =

- village
- Location in Gujarat, India Ghunteli (India)
- Coordinates: 22.5671°N 72.7864°E
- Country: India
- State: Gujarat
- District: Anand
- Taluka: Petlad
- Time zone: UTC+5:30 (IST)
- PIN: 388440

Ghunteli is a village in Anand Taluka (District is also Anand), Gujarat State, India. It is 12 kilometres (7.5 mi) from the district headquarters at Anand.

Nearby villages includes Ravli (1.6 kilometer.), Ravipura (2.5 kilometer), Bandhni (2.6 kilometer), Padgol (3.1 kilometer), and Sanjaya (3.2 kilometer). There are also the towns of Petlad (13.9 kilometer), Sojitra (13.9 kilometer), Tarapur (21.4 kilometer), and Borsad (21.6 kilometer)

There is one school in Ghunteli, called Prathmik Kheti Shala. Most of the students used to go in other cities for further study.
