= Umreth taluka =

Umreth ઉમરેઠ Umapuri, Umrastra, Udumar, Umavati
- city
- Location in Gujarat, India Umreth (India)
- Coordinates: 22.7°N 73.12°E
- Country: India
- State: Gujarat
- District: Anand
- Elevation: 47 m (154 ft)

Population
  - Total: 33,762

Languages
  - Official: Gujarati, Hindi
- Time zone: UTC+5:30 (IST)
- Postal code: 388220
- Vehicle registration: GJ23
- Website: gujaratindia.com

Umreth (Gujarati: ઉમરેઠ) is a taluka and the administrative center of Anand District in the state of Gujarat, India. It is administered by Umreth Nagarpalika. It is part of the region known as Charotar, located in Anand and Kheda districts.

Umreth is also known as the Silk City of Charotar. It became famous for silk sarees and its Pol culture. It commonly looks like Harappa architecture. Umreth lines between Dwarka, Nadiad and Dakor on the State Highway known as “PragatiPath”. It is connected with Baroda, Anand, Nadiad, Ahmedabad, Godhra, Kapadvanj, and Balasinor via roadway. The railway line is broad gauge connecting it to Godhra, covering the Dakor route from Anand. You may Visit Blog Regarding Umreth By Vivek Doshi of Umreth.

Umreth has seen rapid economic growth along the Umreth-Dakor and Nadiad-Dakor road belt. Umreth has an own GIDC Estate, Mainly timber industries and Mamra (Puffed Rice) industries are well developed in Umreth. But still puffed rice industries need support from the government to stay viable.

== About Umreth Taluka ==
Umreth is a Taluka in Anand District of Gujarat, India. It is located 22 km to the north of District headquarters Anand. 78 km from State capital Gandhinagar to the north.

Umreth Taluka is bounded by Mahudha Taluka to the north, Nadiad Taluka to the west, Kathlal Taluka to the north, Thasra Taluka to the east. Umreth City, Nadiad City, Anand City are the nearby cities to Umreth.

Umreth consists of 91 villages and 38 panchayats. It is at 44 m elevation. This place is in the border of the Anand District and Kheda District. Kheda District Mahudha is north towards this place.

Dakor is considered the most important pilgrimage nearby having grand temple of Lord Krishna and receives visitors in millions every year.

Anand, Kheda (Kaira), Baroda (Vadodara), Pavagadh, Ahmedabad, Dakor are the nearby important tourist destinations.

=== List of villages in Umreth ===
- Ahima
- Ardi
- Ashipura
- Badapura
- Bajipura
- Bechari
- Bhalej
- Bharoda
- Bhatpura
- Dagjipura
- Dhuleta
- Fatepura
- Gangapura
- Ghora
- Hamidpura
- Jakhala
- Jitpura
- Khankhanpur
- Khankuva
- Khorwad
- Lingda
- Meghva-badapura
- Navapura
- Pansora
- Parvata
- Pratappura
- Ratanpura
- Saiyadpura
- Sadarpura
- Sundalpura
- Sureli
- Tajpura
- Thamna
- Untkhari
- VansolZala Bordi

== Geography ==
Umreth is located at 22.7°N 73.12°E. It has an average elevation of 47 metres (154 feet).

== Demographics ==
As of 2001 India census, Umreth had a population of 32,191. Males constitute 52% of the population and females 48%. Umreth has an average literacy rate of 71%, higher than the national average of 59.5%: male literacy is 78%, and female literacy is 63%. In Umreth, 12% of the population is under 6 years of age.

Gujarati is the local language here. Also People Speaks Hindi. Total population of Umreth Taluka is 162,428 living in 30,250 Houses, Spread across total 91 villages and 38 panchayats. Males are 84,714 and females are 77,714; Total 32,191 persons live in town and 130,237 live rurally.

== Weather and climate ==
It is too Hot in summer. Umreth summer temperature lies between 32 °C to 45 °C . Average temperatures of January is 20 °C, February is 23 °C, March is 28 °C, April is 32 °C, May is 36 °C .
