= Ashokpuri Goswami =

Gujarati poet and writer

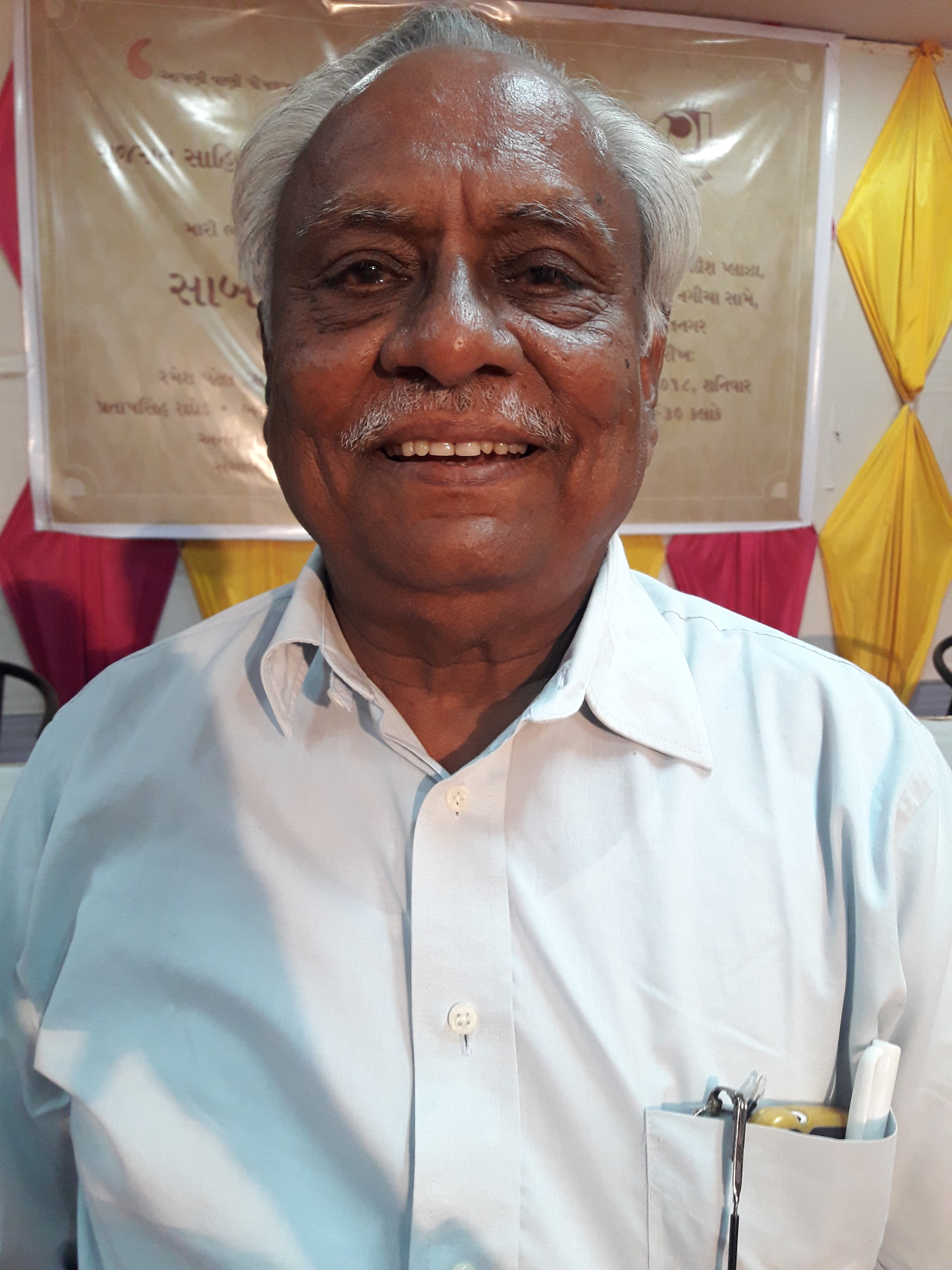
- Goswami at Himatnagar, March 2018
- Born: Ashokpuri Kailasbharati Goswami; 17 August 1947 (age 79); Borsad, Gujarat, India
- Occupations: poet, novelist
- Spouse: Ansooya (m. 1965)
- Writing career
- Language: Gujarati
- Notable work: Koovo (1994)
- Notable awards: Sahitya Akademi Award (1997)

Ashokpuri Goswami (born 17 August 1947) is a Gujarati poet and writer from Gujarat, India. He won the Sahitya Akademi Award for the Gujarati language in 1997 for his novel Koovo (1994).

== Life ==
He was born on 17 August 1947 in Borsad, Anand district, Gujarat, to Kailasbharati and Kamlabahen. His family belonged to Ashi village near Petlad. He completed his primary and secondary education in Navli Anand. He completed old S.S.C. from B. M. Patel High School, Navli. He completed a B.Sc. from V. P. College, Sardar Patel University but dropped out due to poor financial condition. He started working as a farmer in his village. He married Ansooyaji on 21 April 1965. Their son Aayushman was born on 16 July 1998.

== Works ==
He wrote his first poem while studying S.S.C. His ghazals were first published in Kavilok, and later he published in other Gujarati literary magazines, including Kumar, Shabdasrishti, Vi and Navneet Samarpan.

Arthat (1990) and Kaling (2005) are his collections of ghazals. Mool, his first novel, was published in 1990, followed by Koovo (1994), Nibhado (1995), Vedh (1999), Ame (2015), and Gajra. Ravarvaat (1994) is an autobiographical work. He has edited the story collection Vinela Moti (1995). He has edited Setu (2003), a literary magazine published for non-resident Indians, and Rooplabdhi (2005), published by Charotar Vidya Mandal on the occasion of a session held by the Gujarati Sahitya Parishad. He has also translated Dilip Ramesh's Hindi play, Khand Khand Agni.

== Awards ==
He won the Sahitya Akademi Award for the Gujarati language in 1997 for his novel Koovo (1994). He also won the Govardhanram Tripathi Award in 1995 and the Best Book Prize of Gujarat Sahitya Akademi in 1996 for his novel Nibhado (1995).
