= Lingda =

Lingda Lingpur
- Village - town
- Location in Gujarat, India Lingda (India)
- Coordinates: 22°41′19″N 73°04′24″E
- Country: India
- State: Gujarat
- District: Anand
- Taluka: Umreth
- Named for: Paddy fields & Peanut fields

Population
  - Total: 6,000

Languages
  - Official: Gujarati, Hindi
- Time zone: UTC+5:30 (IST)
- PIN: 388220
- Vehicle registration: GJ 23
- Website: gujaratindia.com

Lingda is a village in Anand district in the Indian state of Gujarat. It is located in Umreth Taluka on the Nadiad-Dakor road. The name was derived from the temple of Lord Shiva, named લીંગડા (Shree Siddhanath Mahadev).

== History ==
The Siddhnath Mahadev temple is in Lingda, Umreth Taluka, Anand district. It contains a Rudraksha-shaped Shiva lingam. Devotees regard the lingam as swayambhu, or self-manifested. According to local tradition, it bears a mark resembling a cow’s hoof. Its depth is also said to be immeasurable. Local tradition refers to Lingda as Lingapuram. The village is on Nadiad Road, approximately 11 km from Dakor.

The local tradition ascribes the place to be from the Pandavas’ sojourn through the Hedamba forest. The narrative tells how water emerged when Arjuna shot an arrow into the earth. Some time later, villagers recognized a place where a cow was reported to be shedding milk on to the earth. Local cowherds started to lay down flowers, kanku and rice as offerings at the site and reportedly it was believed that a Shiva lingam was buried there. The tradition also links several Shiva shrines located nearby with the other Pandava brothers.

The narrative also recounts a path linking the main shrine with Siddha Kund, at a distance of about 101 feet, and also leading to the inner sanctum of the shrine. Most of the other shrines were later ruined, though two are reported to still exist. An image of Hanuman was later placed in one of them by Bhupendrabhai Patel, a past headman of the village.

Because of the five Shivalayas, the village was named Lingpur, after which the name was corrupted over time and it is said that it was named Ling-gada ling-gada hai m Lingda Kalantare. Vanzara, about a 5-minute drive from here, has also built a grand Vav, known today as Vavadi. It is said that its water is never missing. It is known that the shooting of the Sri Krishna Leela film in the year 1970 was also filmed here as the location of Vrindavan-Gokula, many of Lord Krishna's children's leelas, Gopi's face painting and Kansaraja's demon killing scenes were filmed here. An arrangement was also made that the water offered in the Shivlinga was directly poured into the Vav. At a distance of about one hundred and one km from the village to the east is the village of Tuwatimba where the remains of Hedambavan's Bhima footprints still survive. About eighty km in the direction of the west south corner of the village. Viratnagari was the place where the Pandavas lived in various forms of hideout (now called Dholaka). Where Bhima's kitchen, Arjuna's dance hall, Sahadeva's stables still survive today which reminds of the Pandava era. The ancient Siddhkund is now like a small pond, when whenever there was a famine, ie dry drought and the animals, birds, and people used to seek water, the sisters-children-mothers of the village used to fill buckets, pitchers, boats from the tank and fill it in the sanctum sanctorum of Shivalaya and water was filled up to the feet of Parvati. After that, the villagers have also seen torrential rain. Therefore, Mahadevji is truly seated. Its truth does not exist without compassion.

After many years, the name of King Siddharaja, who saw the greatness and sanctity of this Shivalaya and renovated it, is also associated with this Shivalaya. Rajmata Meenaldevi of Prabhat Patan in Saurashtra was pregnant after many years and still did not give birth despite having a full period. Mother Minaldevi and some horsemen-armed sepoys went out walking with magazines. After walking for a few days on the way, I felt very peaceful when I reached the place of this Shivalaya to spend the night. I stayed there for the night. Next to the Shivalaya there was a madhuli of a Siddhayogi saint Siddhanath Baba. Baba chanted the Shiva Mantra to everyone, everyone got tired and fell asleep, Mother Minaldevi showed her agony, Baba was a Siddhpurush, meditated and saw that some wise man from the royal family had called a tantric and built Mataji's hut. After telling everything, Meenal Devi requested to show the remedy and Baba showed the remedy. Do one thing Send some horsemen back to Patan Spread the news that a son has been born to the royal mother Distribute sweets in the town Immediately Mataji did it. On hearing this news, Drishta and Tantrika suspected that the work we had done was incomplete, in the deep darkness of the night they dug a hole under the mango tree at the back of the palace and took out the frog that was buried in the box. A failed mother's secret lands the man in jail. Here, Meenaldevi was resting at a place near the Shivalaya, and immediately she gave birth and the prince was born. As Kunwar was born by the grace and success of Siddhanath Baba, he was named Siddharaj. The Shivalaya was commemorated when he was enthroned in the 21st year. Meenaldevi told Kunwar the whole thing and ordered you to go and visit that Shivalayam. Siddharaj visited the temples on his way and was shocked to see this Shivalaya. Outside the Shivalaya there are some inscriptions which are still illegible today, dating from around AD. Believed to be around 900 BC. When King Siddharaj Jai Singh built the temple, he buried all the gold and silver ornaments and diamond jewels that came with the state treasure in the basement, and even today after he returned to Patan, there are crores of treasures lying in the sanctum sanctorum of the Shivalaya but no one can remove it. Whenever there is an attempt to extract the wealth, a large black serpent is seen sitting. Big big eyebrows tend to bite in large numbers. Even though there is no guardrail, veranda or door, the treasure is believed to be safe.

On the days of Janmashtria and Shivratri, a fair is held near the Shivalayam in which numerous devotees from the surrounding villages come to see Shiva. Laghrudra happens on the night of Shivratri. On the day of Shivratri, it is believed that if one sees the Rudraksh Shivlinga, then one becomes the official of Kailasadham, so many people from the surrounding villages come to see it on foot and their unfulfilled desires are fulfilled by doing darshan. And every intended task is accomplished. Due to which this Shivalaya is called Siddhanath Mahadev. The place of Shivalaya premises is so sacred that one feels awe as soon as he steps on it. Apart from that, idols of Sri Jalarambapa, Narasimha Mehta, Mirabai, Ganapati, Shivaji, Parvati and Kartikeya have also been installed. A temple of Shri Saibaba has also taken shape some time ago. In the month of Shravan, there is a huge crowd of people throughout the day. The peaceful atmosphere reflects Satyam Shivam Sudaram. Ghataghor is a temple covered with tamarind trees, ancient but also miraculous and supernatural as well as awe-inspiring. In the dome of this temple, scenes from the Mahabharata of the Pandavas and sacred texts like Ramayana Bhagwat have been created by mixing natural colors. During the Chhappaniya period around 1856 A.D., a terrible epidemic of plague broke out in the village, killing several people. Earlier there was a village around the temple. Without any solution, the entire villagers moved half a km. Started living far away and built a new village. Even now, brick walls of old houses, household earthenware are found in the area around the Shivalaya. The legend of Shivalaya's rich history is told by the elderly elders of the village like former Sarpanchshree Sr. Heard from Dahyakaka as well as late Babubhai Mukhi, late Ambalal Rawal (Topadhan), late Jagdishchandra Gore and late Waghjidada, as well as late Shri Gopaldasji Maharaj, who had served the Shivalaya for many years and left his home at the age of 20, from Pratapgarh, Uttar Pradesh. The resident lifelong celibate Maharaj stayed in this Shivalaya room after traveling across the country and died at the age of 93. Shri Vinubhai Patel (writer) and Girishbhai Rawal have researched and remembered this rich history based on the legends heard from them. Around 1990, once again the entire villagers as well as devout youths, elders have put their heart, mind and wealth to cover the dilapidated Shivalaya with marble. At present, the residence of the priest, the water tank, and the block in the entire square are marked in the courtyard of the temple. Besides that there is a well in Chogan which has been supplying drinking water to the entire village for years. A kitchen has also been constructed with Lokphala, so that meals can be well organized for small and big events of the villagers. At present, Ankhad Brahmachari Shri Balaramji Maharaj from Shri Surat Ashram is doing daily Seva Puja selflessly. He has explained the glory of service work to the youth of the village. Siddhanath Sunderakand Mandal has been functioning for some time. Who have done 1011 Patha villages of Sundarkand around 2011 and still continuing. You too are most welcome to have a darshan of this amazing chatkarik, voluptuous fruit-bearing holy self-manifesting Rudraksharupi Jyoortingling.

== Geography ==
It is 4 km from the town of Umreth (The Silk Nagari), 11 kilometers from Dakor (Temple of Lord Krisna), 19 km from NH-8 and from Anand (The Milk City) and 22 km from Nadiad.

Fifteen ponds surround the village and are used for agriculture. The main canal is Mahi Sichai and many sub canals divert water to cover more than 75% of agricultural land. The water in the land is 10 to 20 feet.

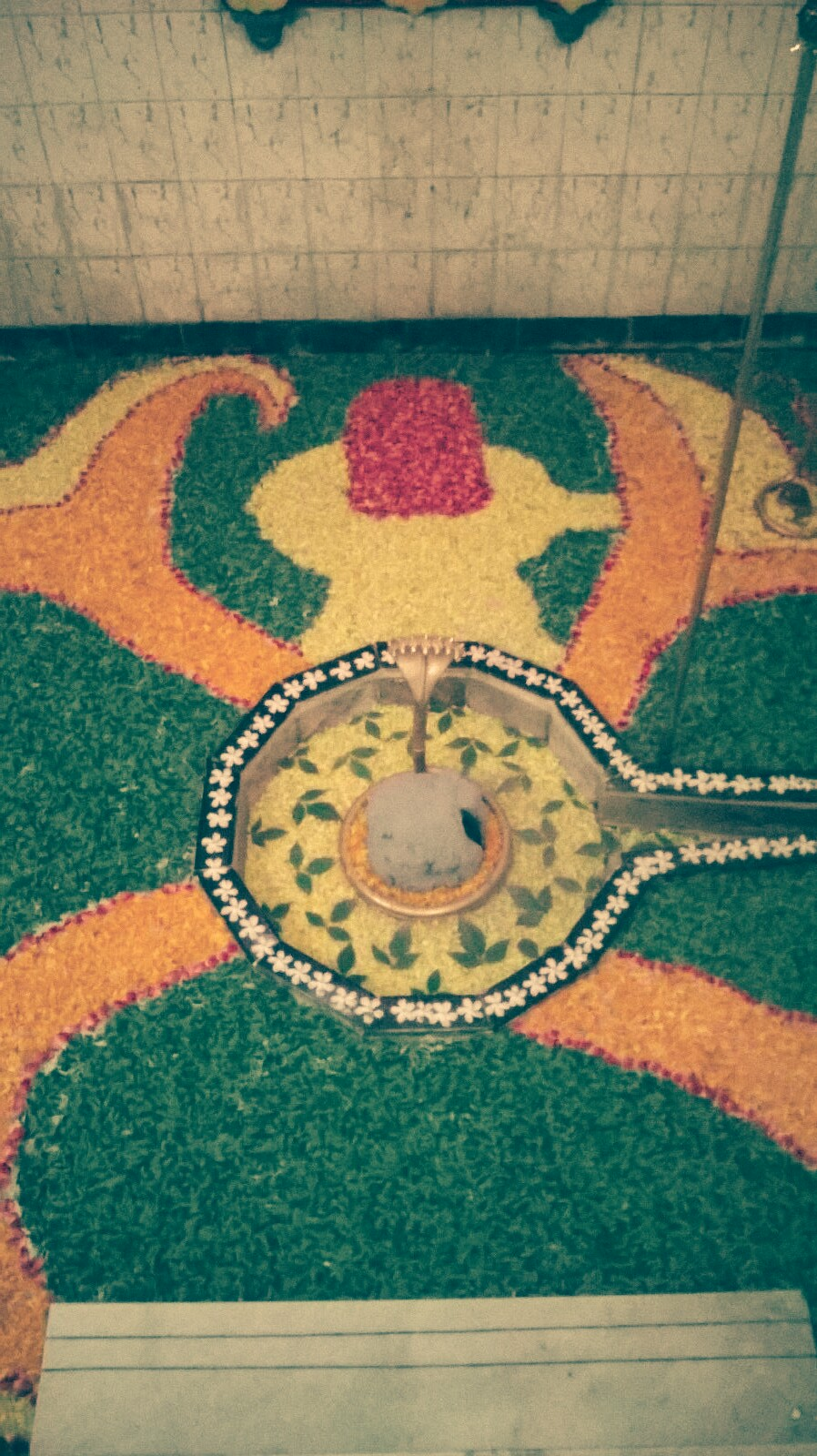
Shree Sidhhnath Mahadev

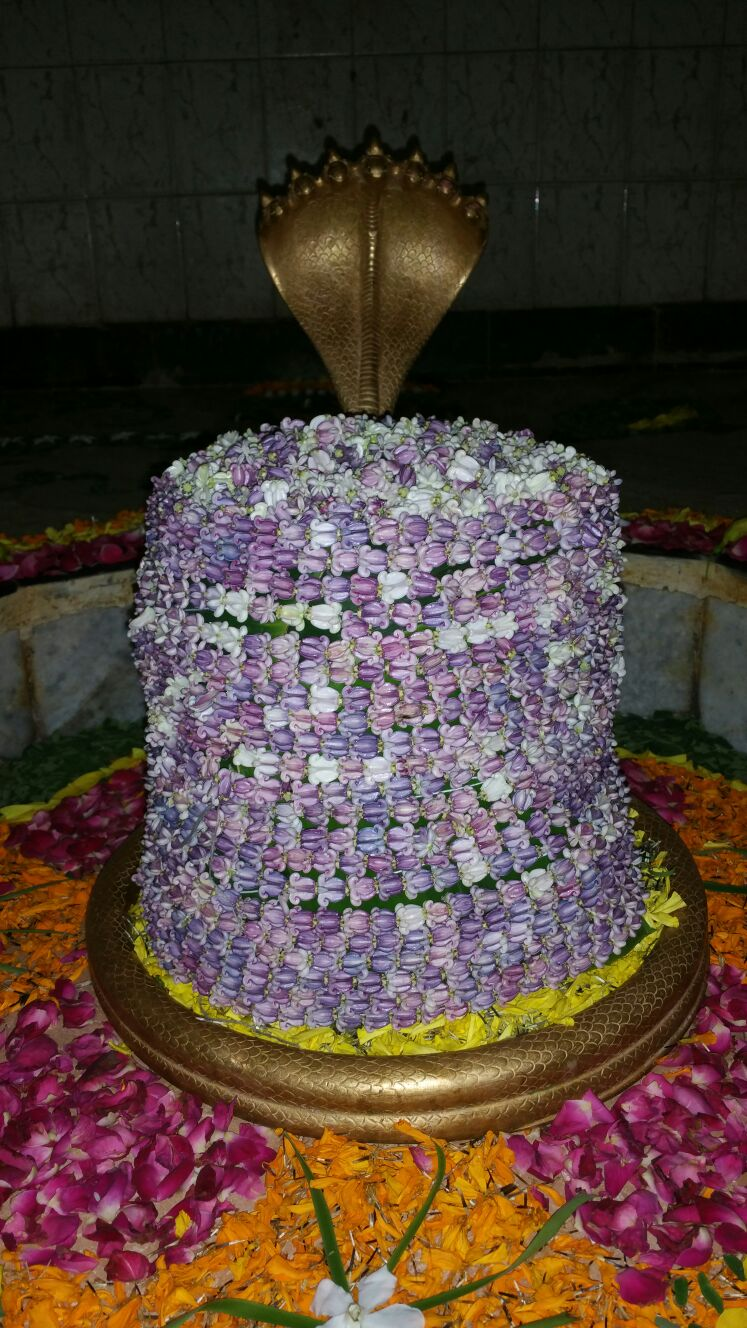
Sidhhnath Mahadev
