= Vitthal Udyognagar INA =

Vitthal Udyognagar Vithaludyognagar, Vithal Udyog Nagar
- town
- Location in Gujarat, India Vitthal Udyognagar (India)
- Coordinates: 22.54716°N 72.91414°E
- Country: India
- State: Gujarat
- District: Anand
- Established: 1963
- Founder: H. M. Patel

Population (2001)
  - Total: 4,103

Languages
  - Official: Gujarati, Hindi
- Time zone: UTC+5:30 (IST)
- Vehicle registration: GJ
- Website: gujaratindia.com

Vitthal Udyognagar is a town and Vitthal Udyognagar INA is a co-extensive industrial notified area in Anand district in the Indian state of Gujarat.

== Demographics ==
As of 2001 India census, Vitthal Udyognagar had a population of 4,103. Males constitute 53% of the population and females 47%. Vitthal Udyognagar had an average literacy rate of 70%, higher than the national average of 59.5%: male literacy was 78%, and female literacy was 60%. In Vitthal Udyognagar, 14% of the population was under 6 years of age.
