= Thamna =

Village in Anand district, Gujarat, India

Thamna is a village in Anand district in the Indian state of Gujarat. It is located in Umreth Taluka. The name is derived from name of 'Thamnai' or 'Thamni' mata. Thamna is mostly famous for its self sustainability and also for its education infrastructure. The small village houses three schools namely Thamna Education institute and K.C. Patel high school. Thamna Education Institute (T.E.I) ranks in one of the best schools in Anand District. Thamna received role model village award in 2004 by President of India Dr A. P. J Abdul Kalam. Thamna had 24*7 water and electricity at that time and now also it has the same facility available. It has high production of banana. Several NCC camps are also conducted every year in Thamna village. The sarpanch of thamna is an NRI. He did his education from the same village. He came back to his roots and gave everything for his village. He is working until now for the development and prosperity of this village.

== Geography ==
Thamnais 4 km away from 'Umreth'. It is surrounded by the villages Lingda, Parwata, Umreth, Vinzol, Khijalpur and Ghora. All the villages are in 4 km vicinity.
