= Alarsa =

Alarsa is a village with a population around 10,000 located in Gujarat, India. It is situated 5 km away from sub-district headquarter Borsad and 14 km away from district headquarter Anand. Geographical area of Alarsa is around 9 km^{2}. It is located in the Borsad taluka.

== History ==
It is said that it was established in the thirteenth century by a fellow named Ramji Vanzara. The original name of the village was Ram rasa. It was given in honor of Ramji Vanzar. Later on during the Muslim Rule of Alauddin, one of his subordinate called Lalkhan changed the name to Alla rasa (After Muslim god "Allah") which later became Alarsa. There is an old belief that Lord Rama spent one night at Alarsa and at that place Ramji Temple was established.

Alarsa is well known for patel samaj patel. Alarsa is famous for great saints like Sitaram Maharaj and Revapuri Maharaj.
