= Harshad Parmar =

Indian politician

Harshadbhai Parmar

Member of the Gujarat Legislative Assembly
- Incumbent
- Assumed office 4 May 2026
- Preceded by: Govindbhai Parmar
- Constituency: Umreth

Personal details
- Party: Bharatiya Janata Party
- Parent: Govindbhai Parmar (father)
- Occupation: Politician

Harshadbhai Govindbhai Parmar is an Indian politician representing the Umreth constituency in the Gujarat Legislative Assembly. He is a member of the Bharatiya Janata Party.

Following the death of his father, Govindbhai Parmar, Parmar was fielded by the Bharatiya Janata Party for the by-election in the Umreth constituency held in April 2026. He won the election, defeating the Indian National Congress candidate by a margin of 30,743 votes.
