= Sojitra Assembly constituency =

Legislative Assembly constituency in Gujarat State, India

Coordinates: 22.54°N 72.72°E

Sojitra
- Constituency No. 114 for the Gujarat Legislative Assembly

Constituency details
- Country: India
- Region: Western India
- State: Gujarat
- District: Anand
- Lok Sabha constituency: Anand
- Established: 2007
- Total electors: 220,898
- Reservation: None

Member of Legislative Assembly
- 15th Gujarat Legislative Assembly
- Incumbent Vipulkumar Vinubhai Patel
- Party: Bharatiya Janata Party
- Elected year: 2022

Sojitra is one of the 182 Legislative Assembly constituencies of Gujarat state in India. It is part of Anand district.

== List of segments ==
This assembly seat represents the following segments

1. Sojitra Taluka - Balinta, Dali, Devataj, Kasor, Limbali, Palol, Piplav, Virol, Runjal, Kothavi, Isnav, Bantwa, Dabhou, Deva Talpad, Gada
2. Tarapur Taluka - Dugari, Fatepura, Chikhaliya, Gorad, Jalla, Khada, Malpur, Mota, Tol, Varsada, Adruj, Changada
3. Petlad Taluka (Part) Villages – Silvai, Amod, Shekhadi, Pandoli, Nar, Sansej, Ramodadi, Manpura, Manej, Khadana, Kaniya, Danteli, Bhurakui, Sundara, Dhairyapura, Vadadala, Dharmaj

== Members of Legislative Assembly ==
| Year | Member | Picture | Party |
|---|---|---|---|
| 2007 | Rohit Ambalal Ashabhai | | Bharatiya Janata Party |
| 2012 | Punambhai Madhabhai Parmar | | Indian National Congress |
| 2017 | Punam Parmar | | Indian National Congress |
| 2022 | Vipulkumar Vinubhai Patel | | Bharatiya Janata Party |

== Election results ==
=== 2022 ===
Gujarat Assembly election, 2022: Sojitra Assembly constituency
| Party | Candidate | Votes | % | ±% |
|---|---|---|---|---|
| BJP | Vipulkumar Patel | 87300 | 56.47 | |
| INC | Poonambhai Madhabhai Parmar | 57781 | 37.37 | |
| AAP | Manubhai Ranchhodbhai Thakor | 3460 | 2.24 | |
| NOTA | None of the above | 2766 | 1.79 | |
| Majority | | | 19.1 | |
| Turnout | | | | |
| Registered electors | | 217,225 | | |
| BJP gain from INC | | Swing | | |

=== 2017 ===
Gujarat Legislative Assembly Election, 2017: Sojitra
| Party | Candidate | Votes | % | ±% |
|---|---|---|---|---|
| INC | Punam Parmar | 65,000 | | |
| BJP | Vipulkumar Patel | 63000 | | |
| Majority | | | | |
| Turnout | | | | |

=== 2012 ===
Gujarat Assembly Election, 2012
| Party | Candidate | Votes | % | ±% |
|---|---|---|---|---|
| INC | Punambhai Madhabhai Parmar | 65,210 | 47.13 | |
| BJP | Vipulkumar Vinubhai Patel | 65,048 | 47.01 | |
| Majority | | 162 | 0.12 | |
| Turnout | | 138,376 | 78.12 | |
| INC hold | | Swing | | |

== See also ==
- List of constituencies of Gujarat Legislative Assembly
- Gujarat Legislative Assembly
