= Umreth Assembly constituency =

Legislative Assembly constituency in Gujarat State, India

Coordinates: 22.7°N 73.11°E

Umreth
- Constituency No. 111 for the Gujarat Legislative Assembly

Constituency details
- Country: India
- Region: Western India
- State: Gujarat
- District: Anand
- Lok Sabha constituency: Anand
- Established: 1972
- Total electors: 271,249
- Reservation: None

Member of Legislative Assembly
- 15th Gujarat Legislative Assembly
- Incumbent Harshad Parmar
- Party: BJP
- Elected year: 2026

Umreth is one of the 182 Legislative Assembly constituencies of Gujarat state in India. It is part of Anand district.

== List of segments ==
This assembly seat represents the following segments,

1. Umreth Taluka
2. Anand Taluka (Part) Villages – Ajarpura, Kasor, Rahtalav, Kunjrao, Tarnol, Samarkha, Chikhodra, Rasnol, Khambholaj, Vaghasi, Boriavi (M), Ode (M)

== Members of Legislative Assembly ==
Election Year	MLA	Party
1972	Udesinh Vadodia	Indian National Congress
1975	Harihar Khambholja	Indian National Congress
1980	Harihar Khambholja	Indian National Congress
1985	Kusumben Khambholja	Indian National Congress
1990	Shubhas Shelat	Janata Party
1995	Shubhas Shelat	Indian National Congress
1998	Shubhas Shelat	Indian National Congress
2002	Vishnubhai Patel	Bharatiya Janata Party
2007	Lal Sinh Vadodia	Indian National Congress
2012	Jayantbhai Patel Boskey	Nationalist Congress Party
2017	Govindbhai Parmar	Bharatiya Janata Party
2022	Govindbhai Parmar	Bharatiya Janata Party
2026^	Harshad Parmar	Bharatiya Janata Party

== Election results ==
=== 2026 by-election ===
Gujarat Legislative Assembly by-election 2026: Umreth
Party	Candidate	Votes	%	±%
BJP	Harshad Parmar	85,500	58.88	
INC	Bhrugurajsinh Chauhan	54,757	37.71	
NOTA	None of the above	2,335	1.81	
Majority		30,743	21.17	
Turnout		145,212		
BJP hold		Swing		

=== 2022 ===
Gujarat Assembly election, 2022: Umreth
Party	Candidate	Votes	%	±%
BJP	Govind Parmar	95,639	51.32	
NCP	Jayant Patel Boskey	68,922	36.99	
Independent	Jagdish Ravji Thakor	5,415	2.91	
AAP	Amrish Hemendra Patel	3,948	2.12	
NOTA	None of the Above	3,857	2.07	
Majority		26,717	14.33	
Turnout				
Registered electors		266,540		
BJP hold		Swing		

=== 2017 ===
Gujarat Legislative Assembly Election, 2017: Umreth
Party	Candidate	Votes	%	±%
BJP	Govindbhai Parmar	68,326	38.60	−2.26
INC	Kapila Chavda	66,443	37.54	N/A
NCP	Jayant Patel Boskey	35,051	19.80	−21.93
Independent	Yakubmiya Malek	1,286	0.72	N/A
Independent	Jayantibhai Parmar	830	0.46	N/A
Apna Desh Party	Ramesh Parmar	662	0.37	N/A
Independent	Bharat Patel	342	0.19	N/A
Independent	Sunil Patel	329	0.18	N/A
NOTA	None of the above	3,710	2.09	N/A
Majority		1,883	1.06	N/A
Turnout		1,76,979		
BJP gain from NCP		Swing	+9.84	

=== 2012 ===
Gujarat Assembly Election, 2012
Party	Candidate	Votes	%	±%
NCP	Jayantbhai Patel Boskey	67,363	41.73	
BJP	Govindbhai Parmar	65,969	40.86	
Majority		1,394	0.86	
Turnout		161,434	74.39	
NCP gain from INC		Swing		

== See also ==
- List of constituencies of Gujarat Legislative Assembly
- Gujarat Legislative Assembly
