= Bochasan =

- Town
- Location in Gujarat, India Bochasan (India)
- Coordinates: 22°24′35″N 72°50′34″E
- Country: India
- State: Gujarat
- District: Anand

Population
  - Total: 8,128

Languages
  - Official: Gujarati, Hindi
- Time zone: UTC+5:30 (IST)
- PIN: 388140
- Telephone code: +91 2696
- Vehicle registration: GJ
- Nearest city: Anand, Vadodara, Nadiad
- Lok Sabha constituency: Anand
- Vidhan Sabha constituency: Borsad
- Website: gujaratindia.com

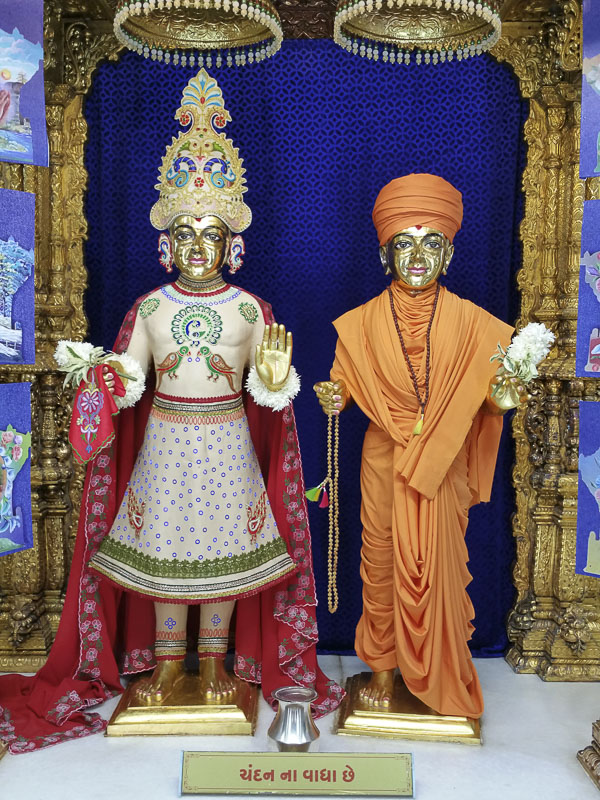
Akshar Purshottam - BAPS Mandir Bochasan

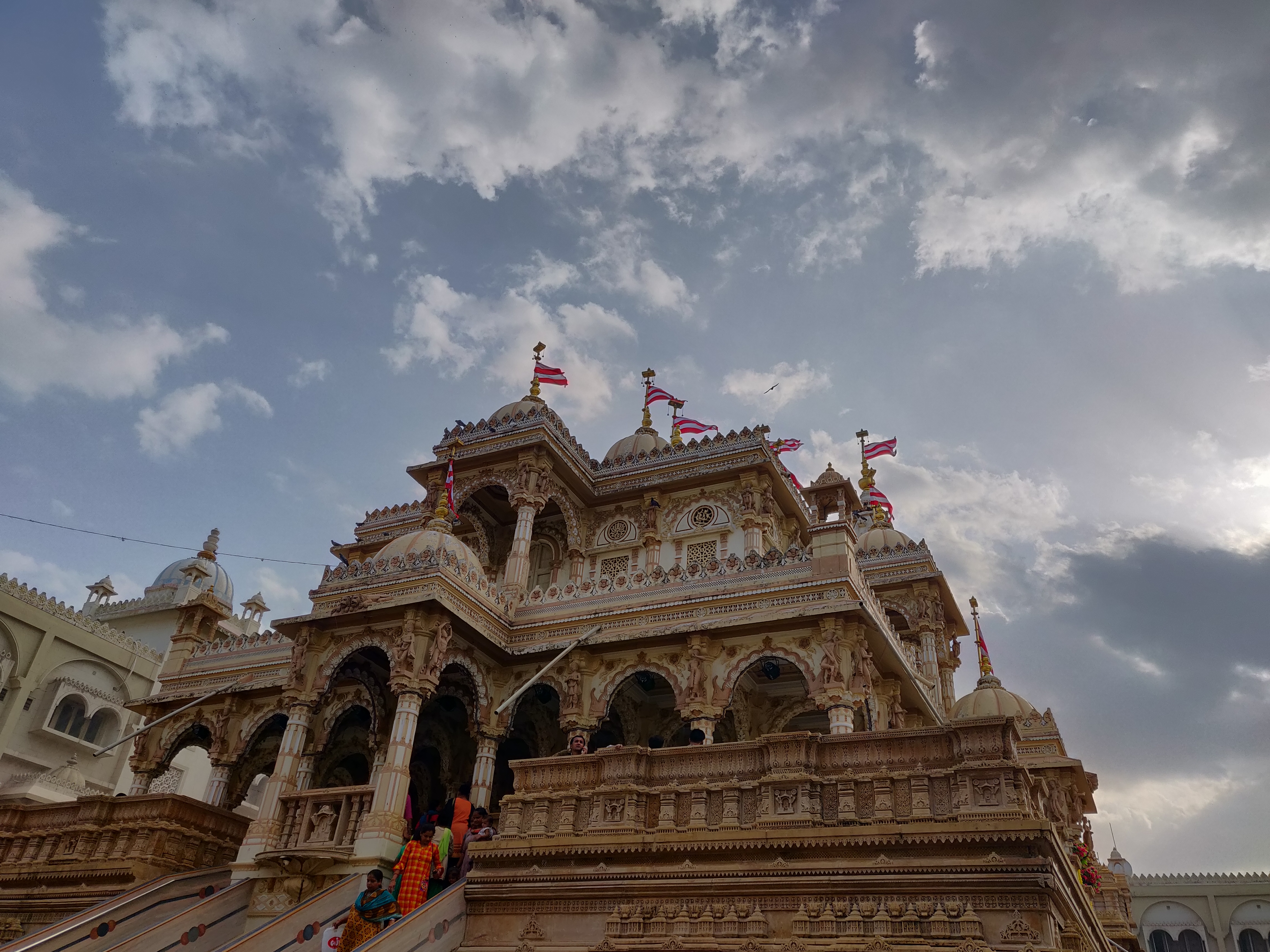
Baps temple Bochasan

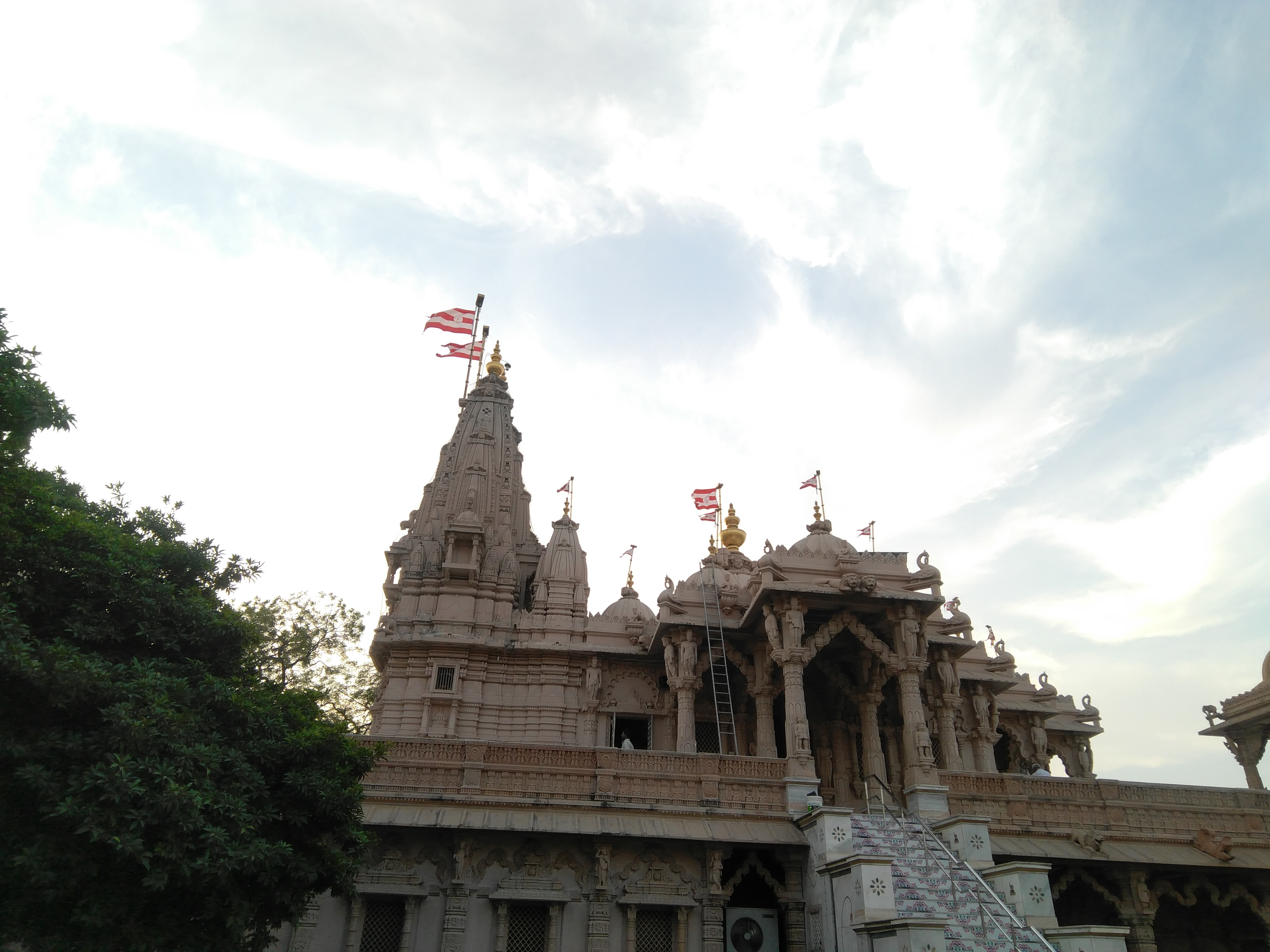
Baps Bochasan temple

Bochasan (Gujarati : બોચાસણ) is a village in Anand district, Gujarat, western India. It is known primarily as the origin of Bochasanwasi Shri Akshar Purushottam Swaminarayan Sanstha (BAPS), so named because its first formal center was established in Bochasan in 1907 by its guru Shastriji Maharaj.

== Demographics ==
As per the Census of 2011, The village of Bochasan has a population of 8,128 of which 4290 are Males and 3838 are Females. Bochasan has a literacy rate of 85.12%, which is higher compared to Gujarat which is 78.03%. Male literacy stood at 93.14 % while female literacy rate was 76.24 %. The population of age group 0-6 is 11.95% the total population. Child Sex Ratio for Bochasan as per the census is 832, lower than the Gujarat average of 890.

== Transport ==
Bochasan is well connected to the roads of Gujarat. The nearest Highway is the Tarapur Vasad Highway. There is a bus station and bus services are available from Borsad. There are, however, no Railway services. The nearest Domestic airport is the Vadodara airport in Vadodara, around 35 km away from the Anand District. The nearest International Airport is the Sardar Vallabhbhai Patel International Airport in Ahmedabad, which is 65 km away from the Anand District.

== History ==
=== In the Times of Bhagwan Swaminarayan ===
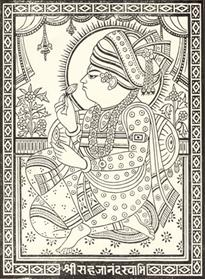
Printed Portrait of Swaminarayan in His time

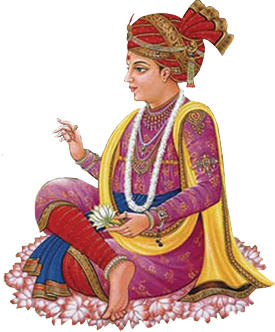
Parabrahm Purushottam Bhagwan Shri Swaminarayan

Bhagwan Swaminarayan in his teenage years as Nilkanth Varni first came to Bochasan in 1799. There, in a local Ramji Mandir, a temple of God Rama, He offered Aarti to the Murtis of Bhagwan Shri Ram, Shri Lakshman and Shri Sitaji. There, he was received by a villager named Kashidas Mota who requested Him to stay in the village, to which Nilkanth Varni replied: "In the future, I will stay here forever with my choicest devotee". He repeated the promise of building a Mandir to Kashidas in Kariyani in 1809 and in Vadtal in 1816.

At the installation of the murtis of Nara Narayan in Kalupur, Ahmedabad in 1822, Bhagwan Swaminarayan showed Kashidas the Murtis and told him : "These murtis will be installed in your village, but albeit a different name". Also, prior to the installation ceremony of the Vadtal temple, the murtis of Lakshmi Narayan were kept in Kashidas' house for safekeeping. Kashidas had requested Bhagwan Swaminarayan to install them in his village instead, to which He replied : "These Murtis are for Vadtal, in your village a grand Mandir will be built where I will reside alongside my Eternal Abode."

=== Shastriji Maharaj in Bochasan ===
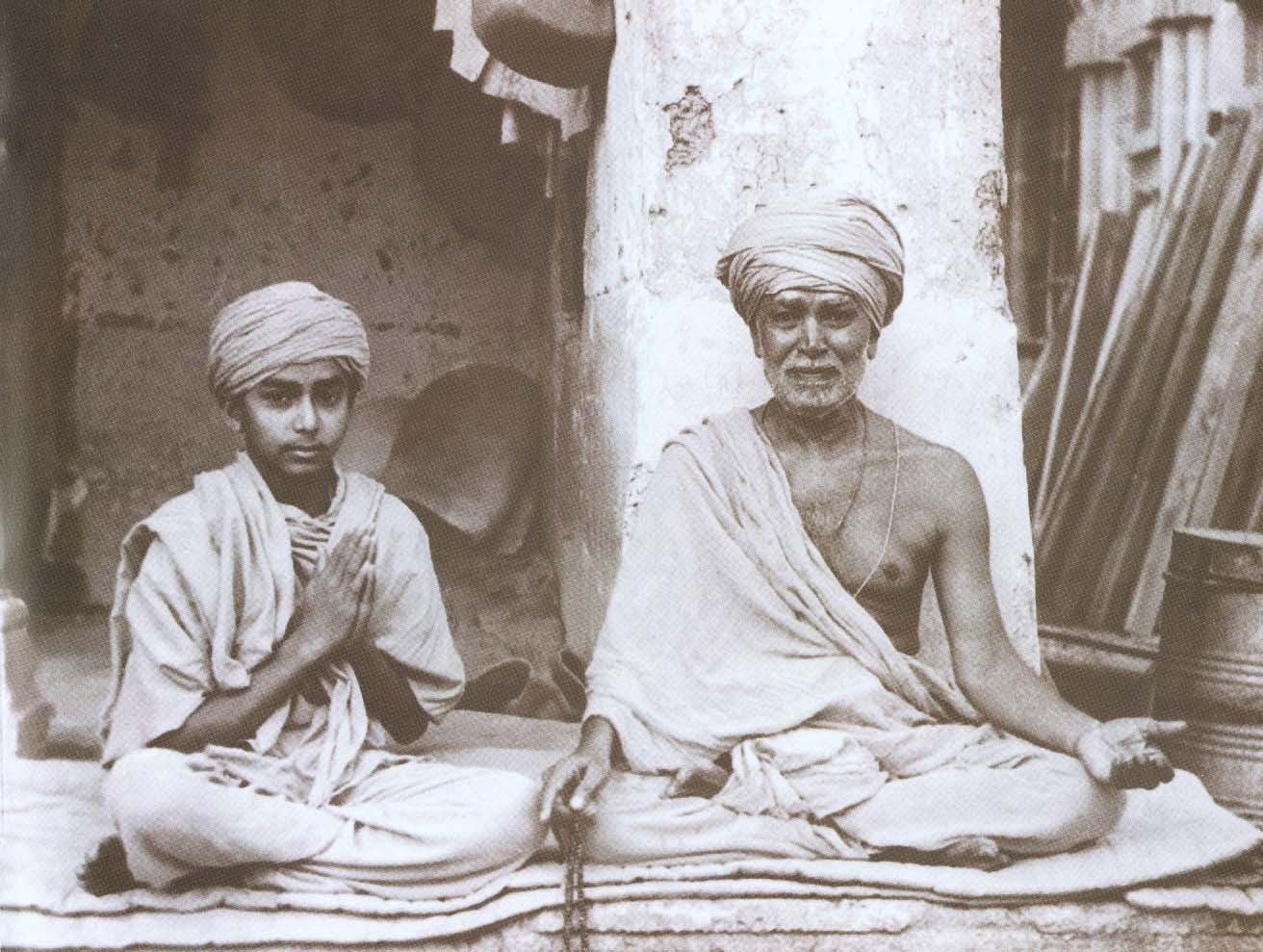
Narayanswarupdas and Shastriji Maharaj

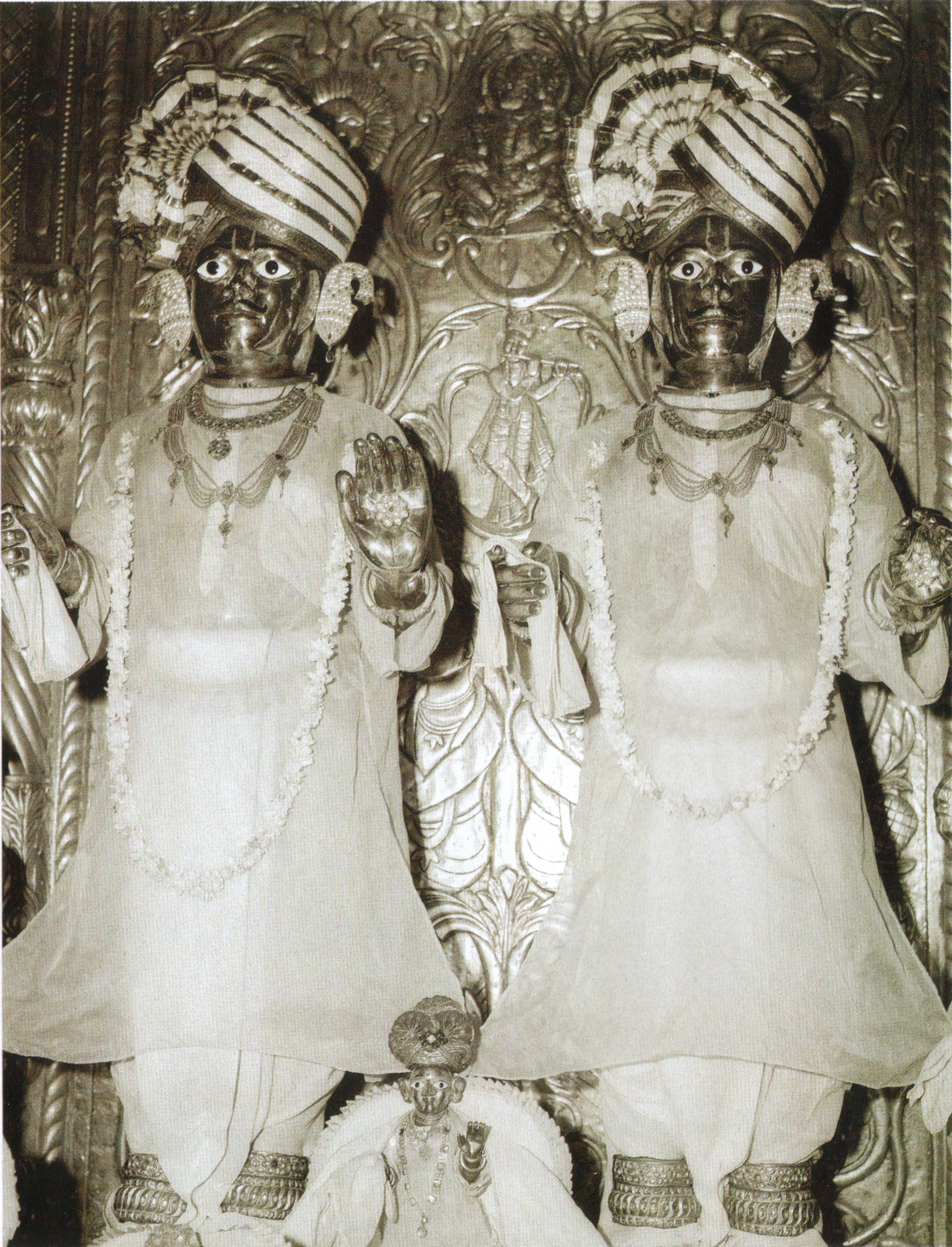
Old Murtis of Akshar Purshottam in the Old Mandir of Bochasan, BAPS

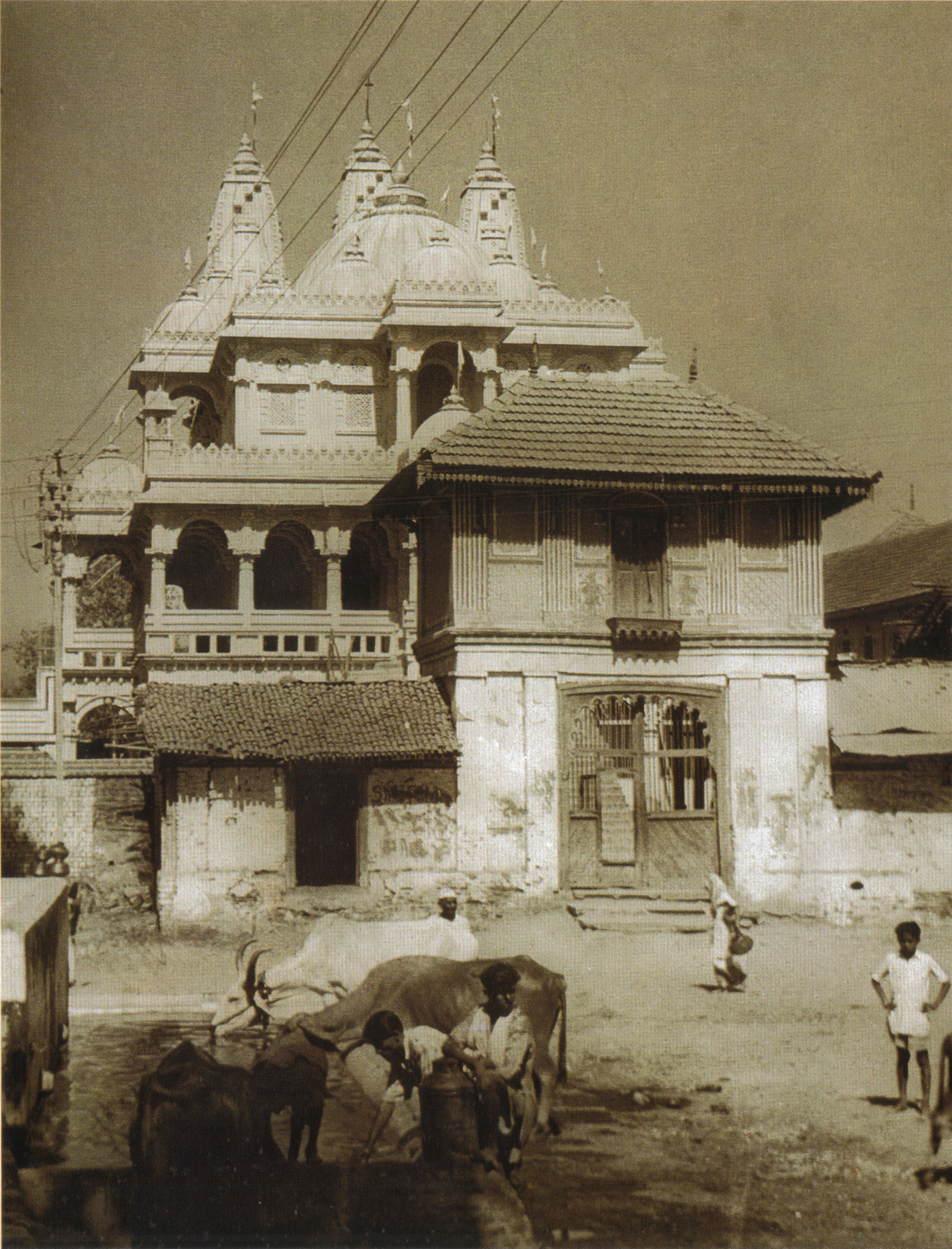
Old Mandir of Bochasan, BAPS

The founding of BAPS was laid by Shastriji Maharaj in 1905 in Bochasan, hence the name Bochasanwasi Akshar Purushottam Swaminarayan Sanstha (abbreviated as 'BAPS'). Shastriji Maharaj had left the Vadtal diocese due to a combination of several reasons like hostility from a section of Vadtal swamis to some reasons. The main reason was in the doctrinal difference of Akshar Purshottam Philosophy between Shastriji Maharaj and the diocese, regarding Gunatitanand Swami as the " true successor of Bhagwan Swaminarayan". Although he told everyone that he was not splitting with Vadtal, but just going to preach in the villages, his departure gave his detractors the excuse they were looking for, and Shastri Yagnapurushdas was, as Prof. Raymond Williams observes, "expelled from the fellowship by a hastily called meeting of swamis"

As the debate raged, Shastriji Maharaj continued to preach in the villages and propagate the Akshar-Purushottam doctrine. Soon, he began to plan and construct a temple in which Akshar-Purushottam Maharaj would be installed in the central shrine of a shikharbaddha mandir in Bochasan, as Bhagwan Swaminarayan had prophesied. Saints and Devotees now had served to their best in the construction of the new mandir in Bochasan which would house the Murtis of Bhagwan Swaminarayan and Gunatitanand Swami. During the Installation ceremony, devotees were unable to lift the murti of Gunatitanand Swami despite it being lighter than that of Bhagwan Swaminarayan. Shastriji Maharaj hence prayed before the murti of Gunatitanand Swami, saying : "It is only for you, Swami, that we countered countless hardships before leaving Vadtal. Therefore, please take your seat in the central shrine." Saying this, Shastriji Maharaj slid a wedge under the Murti of Gunatitanand Swami which was then lifted with ease by the devotees. On 5 June 1907, Shastri Yagnapurushdas consecrated the murtis of Bhagwan Swaminarayan and Gunatitanand Swami in the newly constructed mandir Bochasan. This marked the beginning of BAPS as an organization since it was the first mandir to have both murtis of Akshar and Purushottam in the central shrine.
