= Ode, Gujarat =

Ode
- town
- Location in Gujarat, India Ode (India)
- Coordinates: 22°37′19″N 73°06′58″E
- Country: India
- State: Gujarat
- District: Anand
- Elevation: 39 m (128 ft)

Population (2001)
  - Total: 18,454

Languages
  - Official: Gujarati, Hindi
- Time zone: UTC+5:30 (IST)
- PIN: 388210
- Telephone code: 2692
- Vehicle registration: GJ-23

Ode is a small town and a municipality in Anand district in the Indian state of Gujarat.

== Location and transport ==
Ode is located at 22.37°N 73.06°E in western India at an elevation of 39 metres (128 ft), approximately 10 mi (16 km) north-east of the centre of Anand. Ode railway station, which is about 4 mi (6 km) north of Ode village on the Western Railway's Anand–Godhra railway line. Ode is about 8 mi (13 km) north-east of the Ahmedabad–Vadodara Expressway, and about 25 mi (40 km) from Vadodara Airport. Ode is served by the Gujarat state transport system providing bus services to major cities and surrounding villages.

Ode has many temples including Ranchhodji's Mandir, Swaminarayan Mandirs (Old, New), Ram Mandir, Lord Shiva Mandir, Vaishnav Mandir, Jain Derasar Pranami Mandir and many others.

== Temples ==
Ode has many temples including Ranchhodji's Mandir, Swaminarayan Mandirs (Old, New), Ram Mandir, Shiv Mandirs, Vaishnav Mandir, Jain Derasar Pranami Mandir and many others.

== History ==
Ode was known in ancient times as Pranavpur. In former prosperous times, the Banzara (Gypsy) community built a vav (a well with steps) and an inn for large numbers of visitors. Part of this inn was used as a middle school until 1945. During the struggle for Indian independence, Ode was the centre for the area's Satyagraha movement. In 1930, Narshibhai Jivabhai Patel of Nar sacrificed his life for the movement. The Narshi-Bhavan monument was built in his memory. This building was used as a dharmashala (guest house) as well as a girls' school.

== Population ==
The town has a population of about 40,000 within a 9.9-square-mile (26 km^{2}) area. The local population consists of, Patidars, Harijans, Brahmins, Banias, Kshatriyas, Muslims and Christians. Once, it had a sizeable population of learned Brahmins who attracted many young pupils to learn Sanskrit and astrology. The majority of the population is Patidar, who are involved in various types of business. Many have settled abroad in the United States, United Kingdom, Middle East, New Zealand, Australia and African countries.

== Education ==
The local education board operates a primary school for boys and another for girls. Both these schools were built with a generous donation from Marghabhai Kishabhai Patel. The Sardar Patel Vinay Mandir high school is managed by the Ode Kelavani Mandal under the guidance of the Charutar Education Society. This board also manages a kindergarten. Under the umbrella of various educational bodies, several educational programs cater to youths and adults. These programs include typing classes, painting, music and home science. Two colleges, Devjibhai Muljibhai Patel Arts College and Shanabhai Shankerbhai Patel Commerce, affiliated with Gujarat University, R.P.Patel Bsc. Nursing College, Ode are located on the Dakor Road. Pramukhswami English Medium School is located near the water works on the Ode Kelavni Mandal Campus at Bijahar Talav.

Also in this college they run the B Ed course as well and trustees also built the hostel for the B Ed students.

The Mangaldas Laxmidas Patel Public Library near the hospital is equipped with a large quantity of books on a broad spectrum of subjects.

== Medical ==
Ode has a Jivabhai Patel Charitable Dispensary that has provided a valuable service since its establishment. Bhikhabhai Jivabhai Patel has donated generously to the Kasturba Maternity Home near the hospital. Rambhai B. Patel also contributed to build and equip the operating theatre for the hospital. This hospital has been a boon to Ode and surrounding villages.

== Business and industries ==
Agriculture is the main source of income for Ode. Tobacco, chili peppers, peanuts and bananas are the main income sources for farmers. Ode has a co-operative dairy that operates in association with Amul Dairy to serve the farmers. There are several small scale industries like poultry farms, printing presses, screen printing presses, machine shops, Devi Vijay Saw Mills, Jay Ambe Ply & Hardware, auto garages, Ready-made garment shops including Dilip Store. In order to support the cash crop industry and small businesses, Ode is home to several transport companies. It has a co-operative bank and branch offices for the Central Bank of India, Dena Bank and The Ode Urban Bank and central government postal services here Seva Samiti provides financial assistance to various organizations aimed at the town's multi-purpose development and more than tobacco marchant and petroleum Diesel, Petrol, Oil & Gas dealers are also sellers here.

== Religious and social institutions ==
Ode boasts many temples catering to its mostly Hindu population. It also has two mosques for Muslims and a church for Christians.

Its Hindu temples include Jankidas Mandir, Ramji Mandir, Narandev Temple, Goverdhan Mandir, Swaminarayana Mandir, Kabirsahib's Mandir, Pranamy Mandir, Jain Derasar, Ambamata Mandir, Khodiarmata Mandir, Bhadrakalimata Mandir, Bahucharajimata Mandir, Veraimata Mandir, Kaleshrimata Mandir, Totramata Mandir, Dudheshawer Mahadev, and Nilkanth Mahadev.

There is also Muslim and Christian community and Jummah masjid and Darga also here, three Churches are there, named The Eben Ezer Methodist Church, The Salvation Army Church & The St. Joseph Catholic Church.

Ode enjoys the presence of four community halls. Nathabhai Jethabhai Prathna Hall located near the ST Bus stand, Diwaliba Vadi at Ranchodji Mandir, Sardar Patel Vadi and the two-storey Ashirvad Vadi. These facilities are large enough to hold large dinners and weddings.

== Prominent buildings ==
=== Tower House ===
Tower house was one of the first large buildings built in Ode and is in the centre of the town. It was built by Babarbhai Ghelarbhai Patel who was a wealthy rice merchant who traded between Calcutta and Rangoon in Burma/Myanmar. Work began in 1932 on Rambhai's return from Calcutta and was completed in 1934. The complex originally comprised three separate dwellings; one built for each of Patel's sons, Ambalalbhai, Thakorbhai, and Appabhai. Their descendants are still residents of the properties. Annexes to the original building were later built and today the complex comprises around seven dwellings.

Tower House is a focal point in the town, as the tower part of the building contains an original wind-up town clock. It was recently repaired to full working order and now strikes bells at each hour and half-hour.

Today the descendants of the five brothers Ambalalbhai, Thakorbhai, and Appabhai are still residents of the properties. Today most of the sons and daughters of these three brothers live abroad and have spread the business all over the world.

=== Narshih Bhuvan ===
Narshih Bhuvan was built to commemorate life of 11 year old Narshih, who was killed during freedom fight movement. It is located in ode central market place called "bazar".

== Communal Riots- 'A bad chapter - 2002 violence' ==
Ode was a location of the Hindu-Muslim 2002 Gujarat violence. Twenty-six Indian Muslims were burnt alive in Ode, which falls under the jurisdiction of Khambolaj Police Station area on 1 March 2002. Violent incidents from the town, however, were reported from 28 February and continued until 2 March. In May 2008 the remains of victims of the violence were recovered from a well in the centre of the village. In April 2012, 23 people were convicted by an Indian court for the massacre.
