= Dedarda State =

Village in India

Dedarda is a village and former non-salute Rajput princely state on Saurashtra peninsula in Gujarat, Western India.

== History ==
The petty princely state, in Gohelwar prant, was ruled by Sarvaiya Rajput Chieftains.

In 1901, it comprised a single village, with a population of 783, yielding 4,500 Rupees state revenue (1903–4, mostly from land), paying 103 tribute to the Gaikwar Baroda State.

== External links and sources ==
- Imperial Gazetteer, on DSAL.UChicago.edu - Kathiawar
