= Tarapur, Gujarat =

Tarapur
- village
- Location in Gujarat, India Tarapur (India)
- Coordinates: 22.49°N 72.66°E
- Country: India
- State: Gujarat
- District: Anand
- Taluka: Tarapur

Languages
  - Official: Gujarati
- Time zone: UTC+5:30 (IST)
- Vehicle registration: GJ-
- Nearest city: Anand
- Lok Sabha constituency: Anand
- Website: gujaratindia.com

Tarapur is a town in Tarapur Taluka in Anand district in the State of Gujarat, India. It is located on the Baroda – Rajkot Highway. It is the administrative seat for the taluka, a major trading centre of the Bhal region and gateway to the Charotar region.

== Demographics ==
Tarapur is a multi-religious town with a population of roughly 35,000. The economy is based on farming, trade, and services. Major crops are wheat, rice, chickpeas, and millet. Some of the neighbourhoods are almost empty because people have migrated to Indian cities or abroad for work in businesses and professional fields.

== History ==
Tarapur was established in 1215 by Dharmadas from Adalaj. King Jayarajsing defeated Mahamad Khalji of Delhi. A warrior and farmer named Dharmadas and his five brothers and other relatives were a great help in defeating Khalji, so the king rewarded him with 40 square kilometres (10,000 acres) of land at the border of his kingdom. They were to protect the border and farm the land. They build seven homes and started living in the centre, and divided the land equally. At present his descendants live in Tarapur village and also in the country and abroad.
