= Harihar Khambholja =

Indian politician

Harihar Khambholja was an Indian politician from Gujarat, India. He had participated in the Indian independence movement and Mahagujarat movement. He was a member of Indian National Congress.

Born in Brahmin family, later he became Minister of state for finance and planning in Gujarat when Madhav Singh Solanki became chief minister first time. During Mahagujarat movement, he was secretary of the Mahagujarat Janta Parishad, the apex organisation formed to demand the separate Gujarat state from Bombay State.

He was elected to Gujarat Legislative Assembly in 1975 and 1980 from Umreth constituency.
