= Umreth =

- town
- Location in Gujarat, India Umreth (India)
- Coordinates: 22°41′55″N 73°06′56″E
- Country: India
- State: Gujarat
- District: Anand
- Taluka: Umreth

Government
  - Type: Umreth Municipal Corporation
  - Municipal Chief – Pramukh: Kanubhai Shah (BJP)

Population (2020)
  - Total: 185,320

Languages
  - Official: Gujarati
- Time zone: UTC+5:30 (IST)
- Vehicle registration: GJ
- Nearest city: Anand
- Lok Sabha constituency: Anand

Umreth is a municipality (nagar palika) and administrative seat for Umreth Taluka in Anand district, Gujarat, India. As of 2001 it had a population of 32,191.

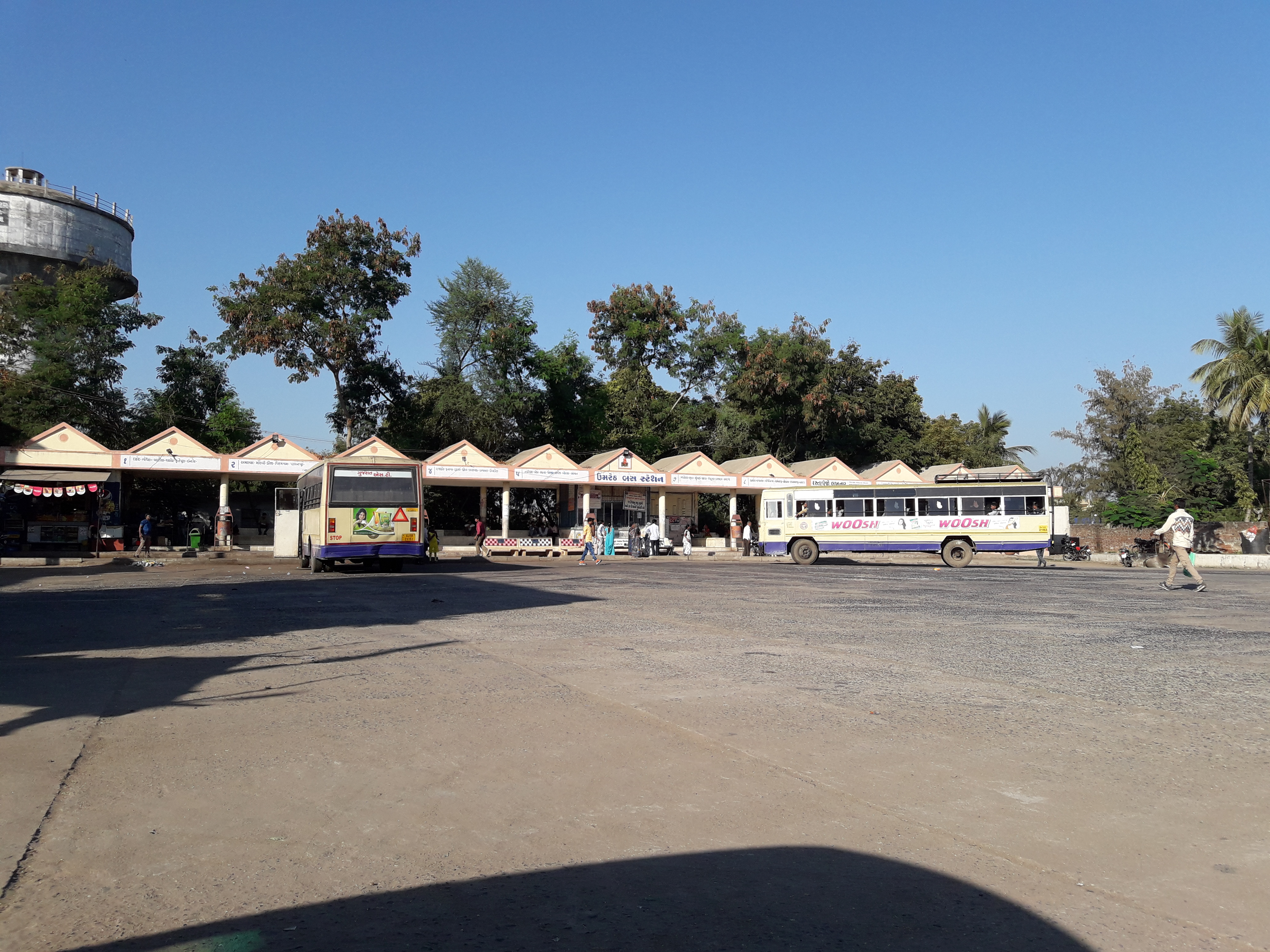
Umreth Bus Station

== Eminent persons people ==
- Dewang Mehta, former President of NASSCOM
- Ashok Bhatt, former Speaker of Gujarat Legislative Assembly
- Harihar Khambholja, former Finance Minister of Gujarat
- Meenesh Shah, Chairman, NDDB
