= Rurka Khurd =

Rurka Khurd ਰੂੜਕਾ ਖੁਰਦ
- =
- Interactive map of Rurka Khurd
- Coordinates: 31.1199928°N 75.7885408°E
- Country: India
- State: Punjab
- District: Jalandhar
- Tehsil: Phillaur

Government
  - Type: Panchayat raj
  - Body: Gram panchayat
- Elevation: 246 m (807 ft)

Population (2011)
  - Total: 3,194
- Sex ratio 1640/1554 ♂/♀

Languages
  - Official: Punjabi
- Time zone: UTC+5:30 (IST)
- PIN: 144409
- Telephone code: 01826
- ISO 3166 code: IN-PB
- Vehicle registration: PB 37
- Post Office: Rurka Khurd
- Website: jalandhar.nic.in

Rurka Khurd (Punjabi: ਰੂੜਕਾ ਖੁਰਦ) is a large size village in Phillaur tehsil of Jalandhar District of Punjab State, India. Kalan is Persian language word which means Big and Khurd is Persian word which means small when two villages have same name then it is distinguished with Kalan means Big and Khurd means Small used with Village Name. It is located 1.6 km away from postal head office Goraya, 16.7 km from Phillaur, 35 km from district headquarter Jalandhar and 129 km from state capital Chandigarh. The village is administrated by a sarpanch who is an elected representative of village as per Panchayati raj (India). The man in the photograph is native to this village. It was his first time getting his picture taken as well. He is a cattle herder. His name is Jattmandeep Singh and has a rich knowledge of the village

== Education ==
The village has a co-ed upper primary school (Gms Rurka Khurd School) which was founded in July 1972. The schools provide a mid-day meal as per the Indian Midday Meal Scheme. The village also has some privet co-ed primary with upper primary and secondary schools. gurdwara school.

== Demography ==
As of 2017, Rurka Khurd has approximately 762 houses and population of 3,356 of which 1,840 include are males while 1,654 are females according to the report published by Census India in 2017. The literacy rate of Rurka Khurd is 81.63%, higher than state average of 75.84%. The population of children under the age of 6 years is 336 which is 10.52% of total population of Rurka Khurd, and child sex ratio is approximately 998, higher than state average of 856.

=== Caste ===
Most of the people are from Schedule Caste which constitutes 41.36% of total population in Rurka Khurd. The town does not have any Schedule Tribe population so far. there are so many cast living in the village.

=== Work profile ===
As per Census 2017, 1071 people are engaged in work activities out of the total population of Rurka Khurd which includes 929 males and 132 females. According to census survey report 2011, 89.32% of workers describe their work as main work and 12.68% workers are involved in marginal activity providing livelihood for less than 6 months. Of the 1041 in the working population, 79.64% workers are occupied in main work, 7.9% are cultivators while 1.7% are Agricultural labourer. numbers of houses being built are growing yearly. farming jobs are growing every day.

== Transport ==
=== Rail ===
Goraya is the nearest train station; however, Phagwara Jn Railway Station is 13.5 km away from the village.

=== Air ===
The nearest domestic airport is located 47.6 km away in Ludhiana and the nearest international airport is located in Chandigarh also Sri Guru Ram Dass Jee International Airport is the second nearest airport which is 129 km away in Amritsar.
