= Dhuleta =

- Village
- Location in Punjab, India Dhuleta (India)
- Coordinates: 31.1154502°N 75.8228862°E
- Country: India
- State: Punjab
- District: Jalandhar
- Tehsil: Phillaur
- Elevation: 246 m (807 ft)

Languages
  - Official: Punjabi
- Time zone: UTC+5:30 (IST)
- PIN: 144418
- Telephone code: 01826
- ISO 3166 code: IN-PB
- Vehicle registration: PB 37
- Post office: Bara Pind
- Website: jalandhar.nic.in

Dhuleta is a village in Phillaur tehsil of Jalandhar district, of Punjab State, India. It is located 1 kilometre (0.62 mi) away from postal head office Bara Pind. The village is 6.4 kilometres (4.0 mi) away from Apra, 38.5 kilometres (23.9 mi) from Jalandhar, and 125 kilometres (78 mi) from state capital Chandigarh. The village is administrated by a sarpanch who is an elected representative of village as per Panchayati raj.

== Education ==
The village has a Punjabi Medium, co-ed upper primary school (Gps Dhuleta School). The school provides mid-day meal and it was founded in 1952.

== Transport ==
=== Rail ===
The nearest train station is situated 6.9 kilometres (4.3 mi) away in Goraya and Phagwara Jn Railway Station is 16.7 kilometres (10.4 mi) away from the village.

=== Air ===
The nearest domestic airport is 45.4 kilometres (28.2 mi) away in Ludhiana and the nearest international airport is 133 kilometres (83 mi) away in Amritsar. The next nearest international airport is located in Chandigarh.
