= Tajpura =

Tajpura is a village in Mohali district in the state of Punjab, India.
