= Jayantbhai Patel Boskey =

Indian politician

Jayantbhai Ramanbhai Patel, popularly known as Boskey is an Indian politician.

== Early life and education ==
Boskey was born in Aden (a city in South Yemen) on 16 May 1960. He acquired his primary schooling in the Bhagalpur district of Bihar at Mt. Carmel Convent School and at C.M.S. High School. He completed his graduation in Commerce from Vallabh Vidyanagar (B.J.V.M.).

Later in the year 1988, Boskey was married to Rita Patel, a Commerce Graduate from Mumbai College, Mumbai. They had their first child, Unnati Patel, in the year 1989 and their second child, Krishna Patel, in 1991.

=== Inclination towards Sports ===
Boskey had an innate inclination towards cricket and football during his school and college days. In the year 1976-77, he played for Bihar School Boys in The Cooch Behar Trophy. In the following year, he played as a goalkeeper in the football team of Bihar School Boys. In the year 1979-80, he played cricket along with Rubin Mukherji's Tata team at the Junior County, Q.K. London. He has also played for the Bhagalpur Senior District team against the cricket teams of Patna, Bihar, etc. He is keenly interested in cricket.

== Political career ==
Boskey was elected as the MLA from 134 Sarsa Constituency in the year 1990. In the year 1992, he was selected as the Parliamentary Secretary to the honorable Chief Minister (સંસદીય સચિવ) and contributed to the fields of Youth Service, Sports Affairs, and Public Grievance.

The elections contested by Boskey can be summarized as:
| Year | Constituency | Party | Outcome |
|---|---|---|---|
| 1990 | 134 Sarsa Constituency | Congress | Won |
| 1995 | 134 Sarsa Constituency | Congress | Lost |
| 1998 | 134 Sarsa Constituency | Independent Candidate | Lost |
| 2002 | 134 Sarsa Constituency | NCP | Lost |
| 2007 | 134 Sarsa Constituency | NCP | Won |
| 2012 | Umreth | NCP | Won |
| 2017 | Umreth | NCP | Lost |

== Offices held ==
1990-1995: MLA, 134 Sarsa Constituency

2007-2012: MLA, 134 Sarsa Constituency

2012-2017: MLA, 111 Umreth Constituency

2005: President, Gujarat NCP

2017: General Secretary, Gujarat NCP

2020–present: President, Gujarat NCP
