= Bara Pind, Jalandhar =

Bara Pind
- Village
- Interactive map of Bara Pind
- Coordinates: 31°06′59.66″N 75°48′25.87″E
- Country: India
- State: Punjab
- District: Jalandhar

Languages
  - Official: Punjabi
- Time zone: UTC+05:30 (IST)

Bara Pind is a village in Phillaur Tehsil of the Jalandhar district of Punjab, India. It is on the Goraya to Apra road, close to dhulta village. Bara Pind is well linked by road with Phagwara, Phillaur, Goraya and other neighboring villages and towns. It has historical gurudwaras, mandirs and mosques.

Goraya Railway Station (5 km) serves this area. The nearest airport is at Ludhiana. Bara Pind's population is around 4500 people. There are 9 gurudwaras, 4 mandirs, 2 mosques, 4 schools and 2 stadiums. Bara Pind is one of the biggest towns in the area. Bhai Kulveer Singh Khalsa is also from Bara Pind.
