= Sojitra =

- Villages in Gujarat
- Interactive map of Sojitra
- Coordinates: 22°33′0″N 72°43′11″E
- Country: India
- State: Gujarat
- District: Anand

Population
  - Total: Approx. 25,000
- Time zone: UTC+5.30
- Postal code: 387240
- Area code: telephone code 02697 Pin code 387240 Plate registration GJ 23

Sojitra is a village in the Indian state of Gujarat. It is in the Anand district, situated at 22°33′N 72°43′E. Its nearest villages are Isnav (4 km away), Dabhou (6 km away), Gada (4 km), Devataj (2 km), and Limbali (3 km). The village is home to several schools, including Smt. H.J. Patel Primary School for Girls, inaugurated by the Governor of Gujarat in 2006 and The M.M. High School and Library. Sojitra also has a number of temples dedicated to different deities of Hindu and Jain faiths.
