= Borsad =

- Town
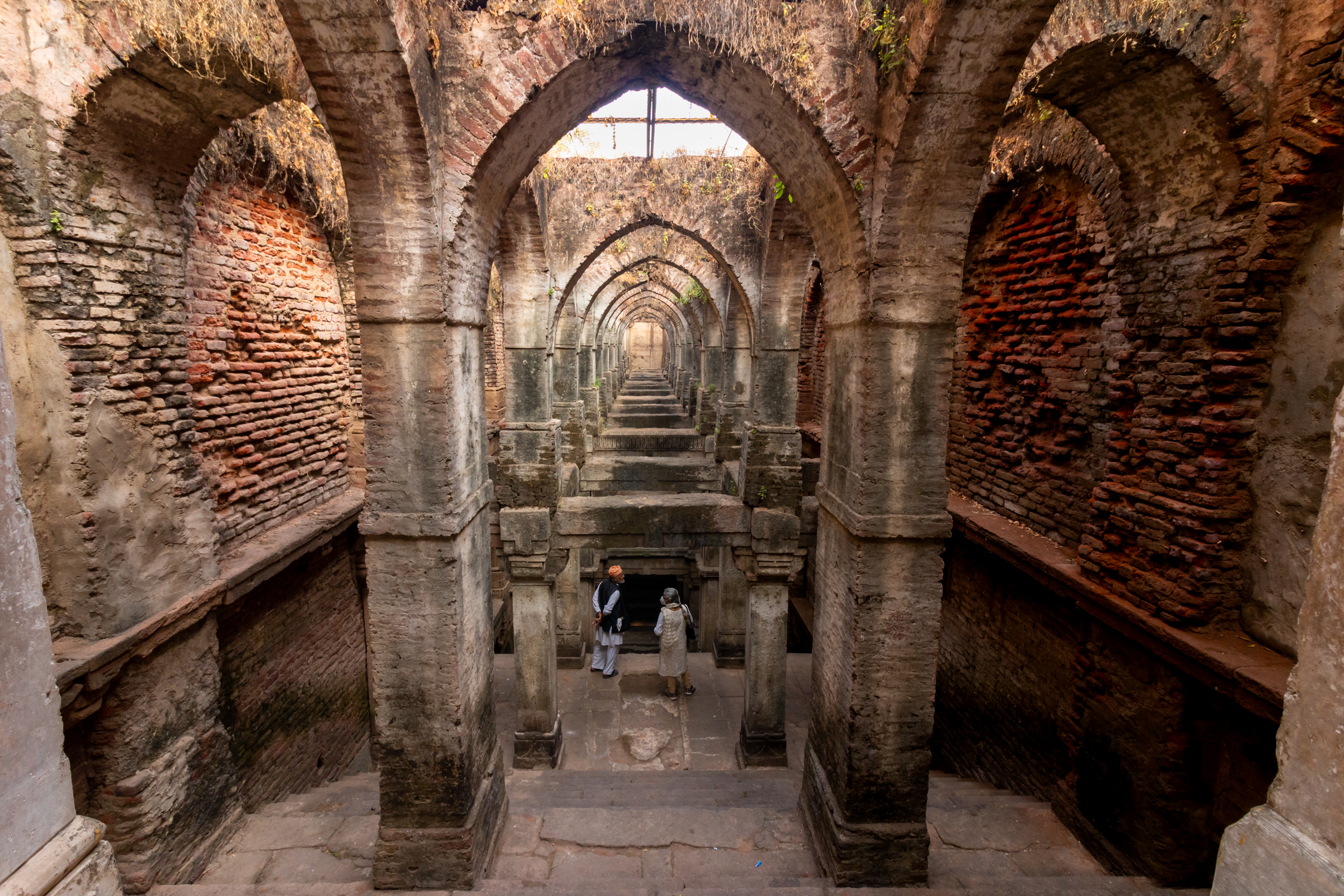
- Borsad Stepwell

- Location in Gujarat, India, Asia.
- Coordinates: 22.42°N 72.9°E
- Country: India
- State: Gujarat
- District: Anand

Government
  - Type: Nagarpalika
- Elevation: 30 m (98 ft)

Population (2011)
  - Total: 63,377

Languages
  - Official: Gujarati, Hindi, English
- Time zone: UTC+5:30 (IST)
- Vehicle registration: GJ-23

Borsad is a town and a municipality in Anand district in the state of Gujarat, India. It is located around 17 km from Anand. It is surrounded by the fertile Charotar region which largely produces tobacco, bananas, cotton, barley and other agricultural crops. Borsad was the seat of the Borsad satyagraha in 1922–23.

== History ==
According to a legend Borsad was established as a hamlet by the efforts of a monk in 2nd Century A.D. and remained an important place ever since. It was declared a municipality in 1888 and in 1925, Indian political leader Sardar Vallabhbhai Patel and his allies uncovered evidence suggesting that the police were in league with local dacoits in the Borsad taluka even as the government prepared to levy a major tax for fighting dacoity in the area. More than 6,000 villagers assembled to hear Patel speak and supported the proposed agitation against the tax, which was deemed immoral and unnecessary. Patel organized hundreds of Congressmen, sent instructions and received information from across the district. Every village in the taluka resisted payment of the tax, and through cohesion, also prevented the seizure of property and lands. After a protracted struggle, the government withdrew the tax. Historians believe that one of Patel's key achievements was the building of cohesion and trust amongst the different castes and communities which were divided on socio-economic lines.

== Geography ==
Borsad is located at 22.42°N 72.9°E. It has an average elevation of 30 metres (98 feet).

== Places of interest ==
The Borsad Stepwell was built in 1497 by Vasu Soma and his family. It is seven story stepwell and has 13 arches. The water is reached by flight of steps.

Napa Wanto tank was built by Mahmud Begada which has a house in the middle of it. Mahakaleshwar Mahadev temple has enormous Shiva linga.

=== List of Villages in Borsad Taluka ===
There are 64 villages in Borsad Taluka.

- Alarsa
- Amiyad
- Badalpur
- Banejda
- Bhadran
- Bhadraniya
- Bochasan
- Bodal
- Chuva
- Dabhasi
- Dahemi
- Dahewan
- Dali
- Davol
- Dedarda
- Dhanavasi
- Dhobihui
- Dhundakuva
- Divel
- Gajana
- Gorel
- Gorva
- Harkhapura
- Jantral
- Kalu
- Kanbha
- Kandhroti
- Kankapura
- Kasari
- Kasumbad
- Kathana
- Kathol
- Kavitha
- Khanpur
- Khedasa
- Kinkhlod
- Kothiya Khad
- Moti Sherdi
- Naman
- Nani Sherdi
- Napa Talpad
- Napa Vanto
- Nisaraya
- Pamol
- Pipli
- Ranoli
- Ras
- Rudel
- Saijpur
- Salol
- Santokpara
- Singlav
- Sisva
- Sur Kuva
- Umlav
- Uneli
- Vachhiyel
- Vadeli
- Vahera
- Valvod
- Vansa
- Vansa (These are different)
- Visad
- Zarola

== Demographics ==
As of 2011 India census, Borsad had a population of 63,377. Males constitute 52% of the population and females 48%. Borsad has an average literacy rate of 68%, higher than the national average of 59.5%; with male literacy of 75% and female literacy of 60%. 13% of the population is under 6 years of age.

== People ==
- Ashokpuri Goswami, a Gujarati writer is born here.
- Babar Deva, Gujarati dacoit
