= Anand district =

- District
- Charotar Region Of Gujarat
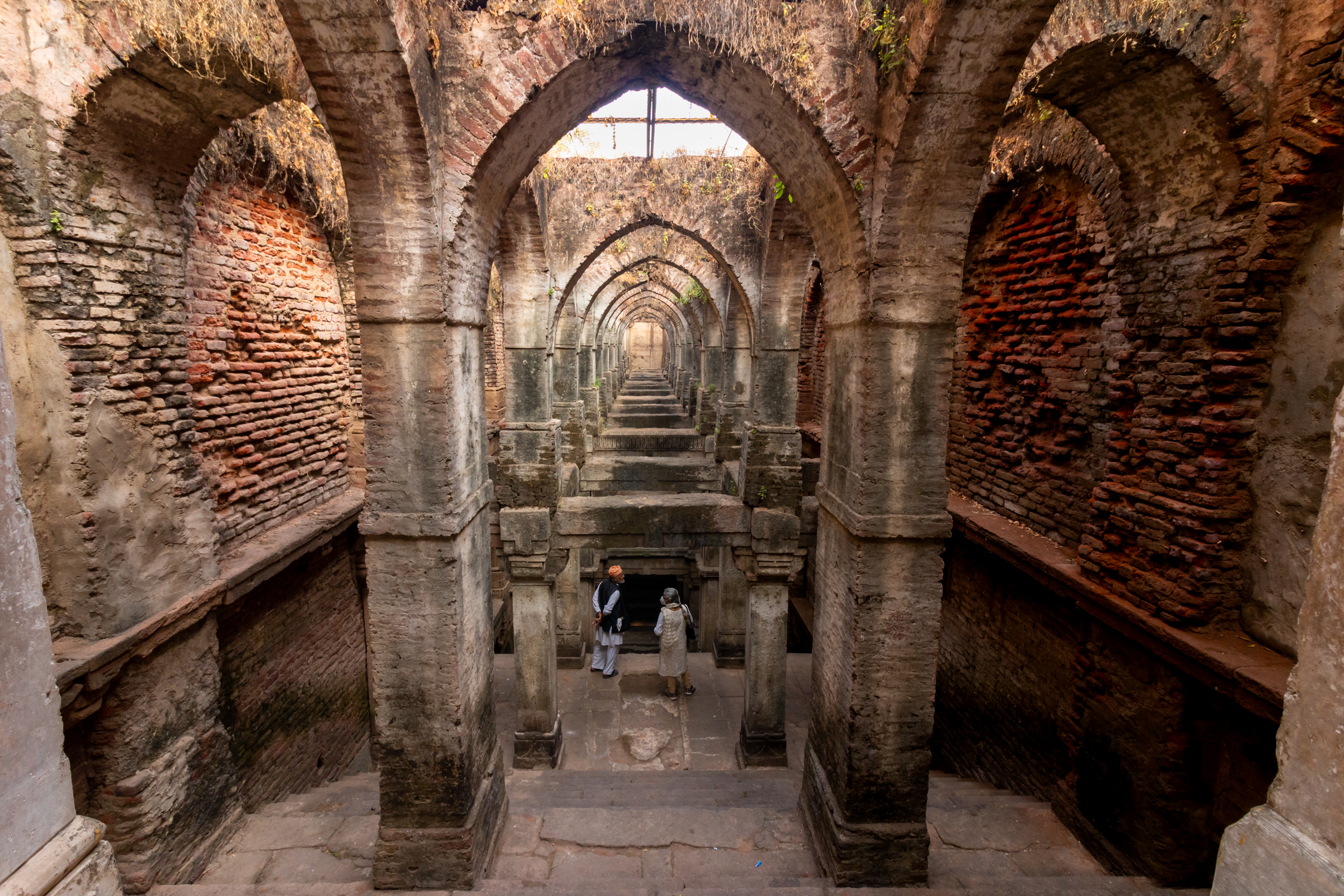
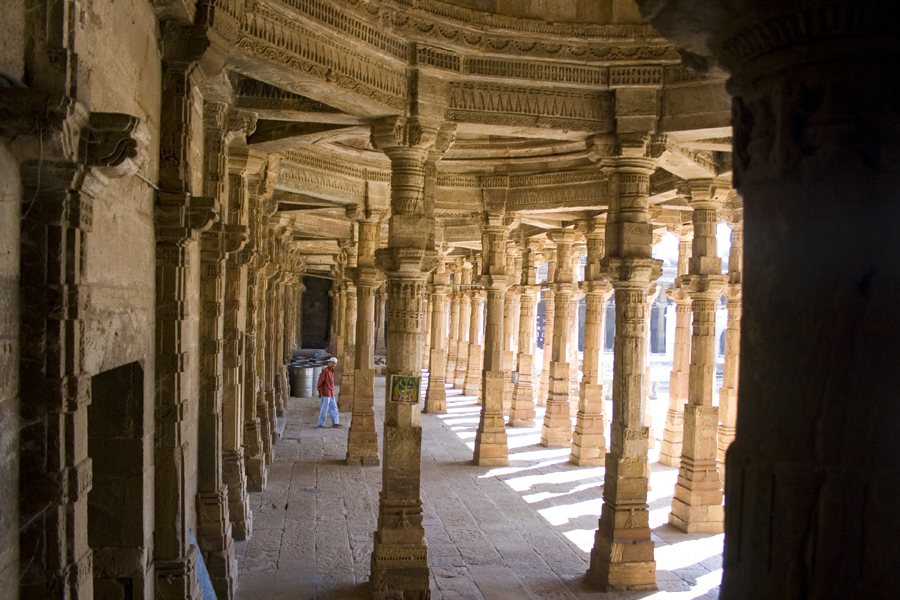
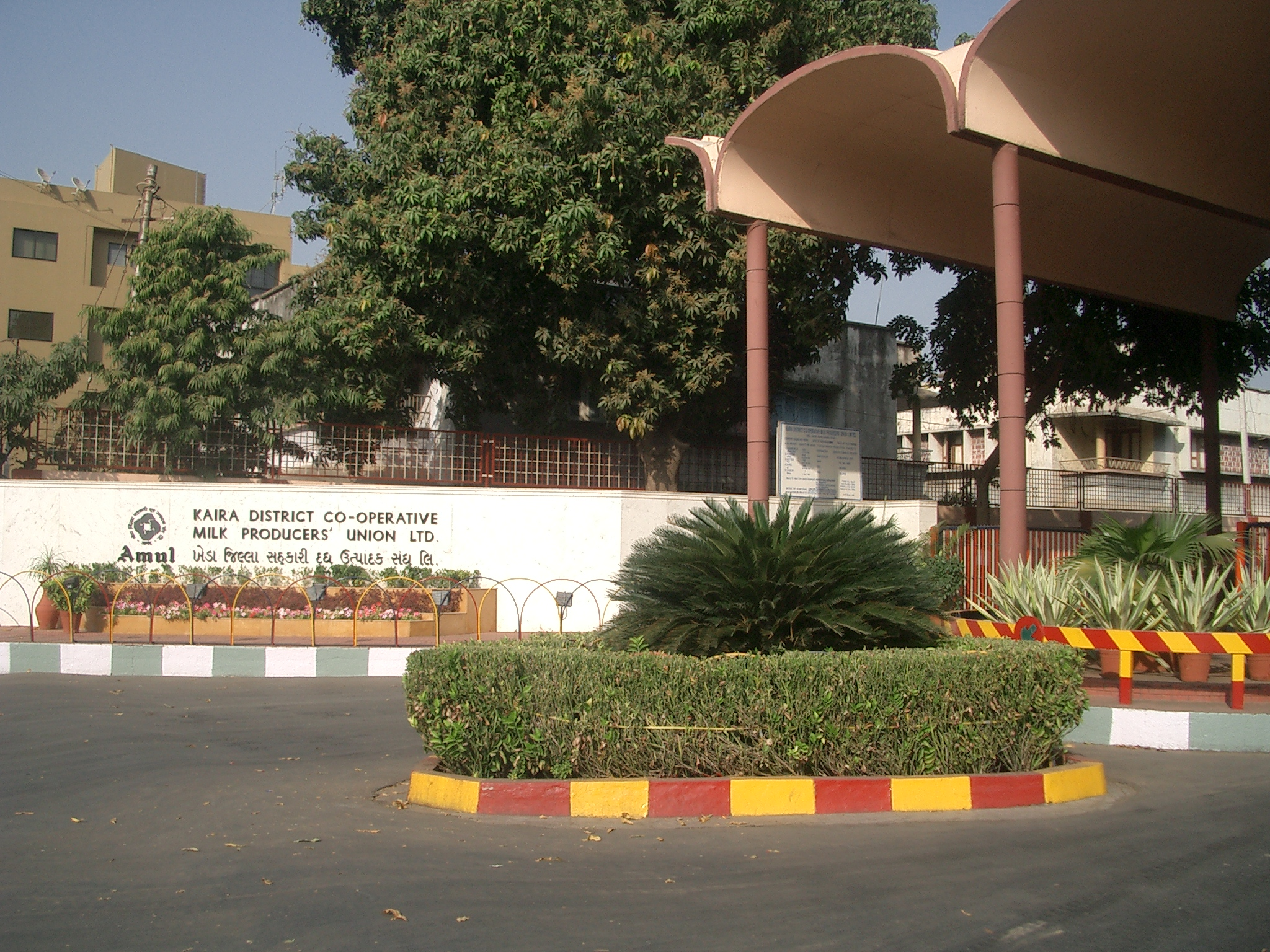
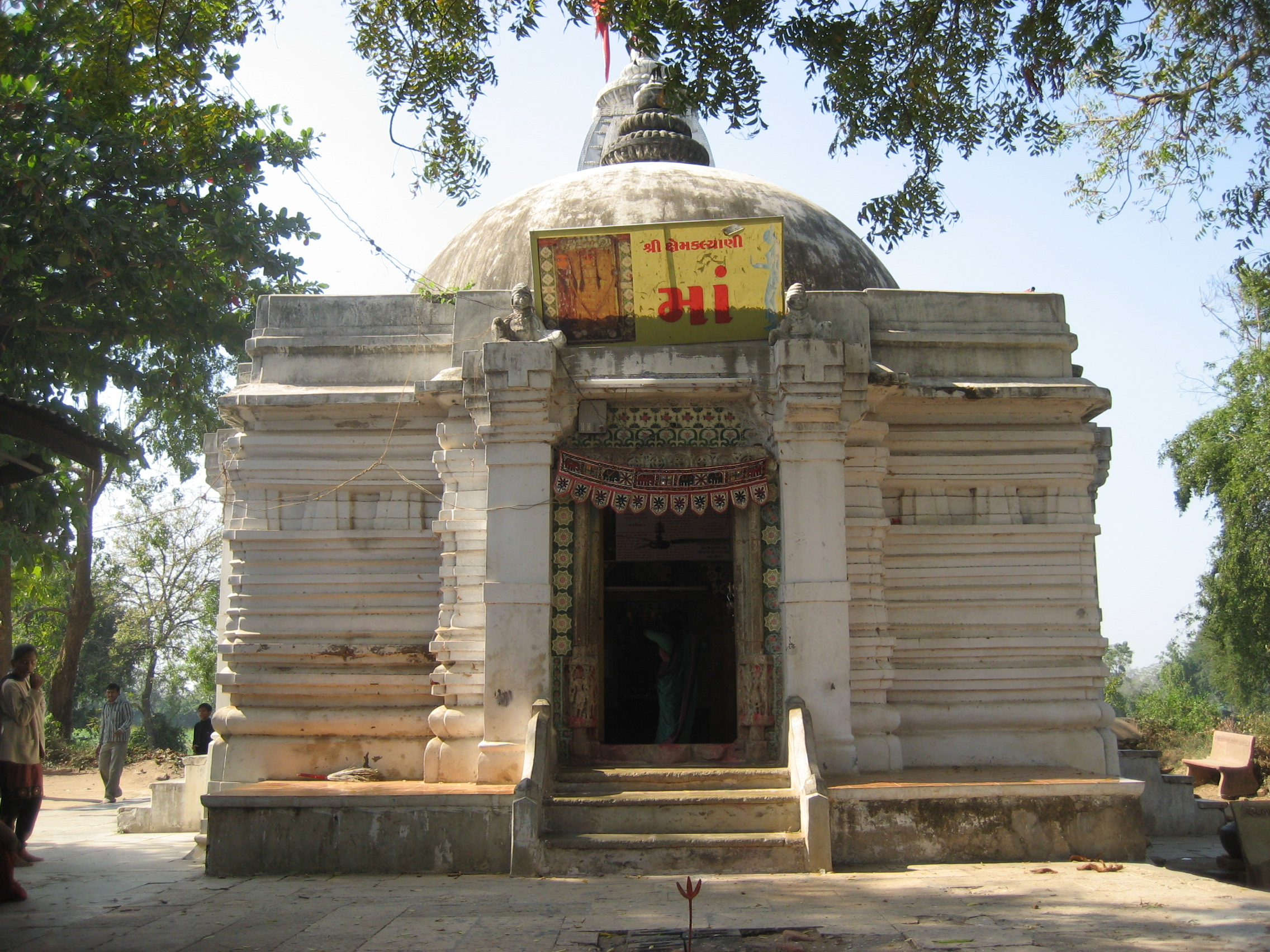
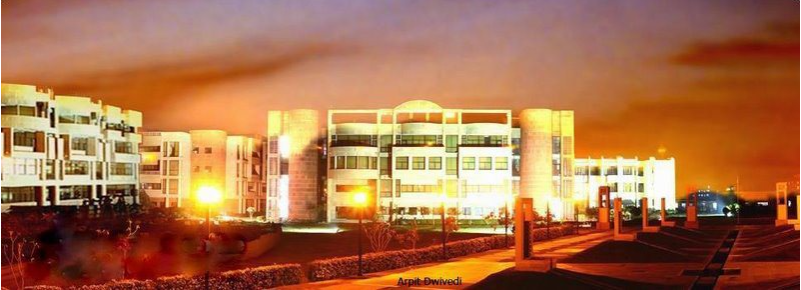
- Clockwise from top-left: Borsad Stepwell, Jamia Masjid in Khambhat, Kshemkalyani Mata Temple in Sojitra, GCET college, Amul factory in Anand

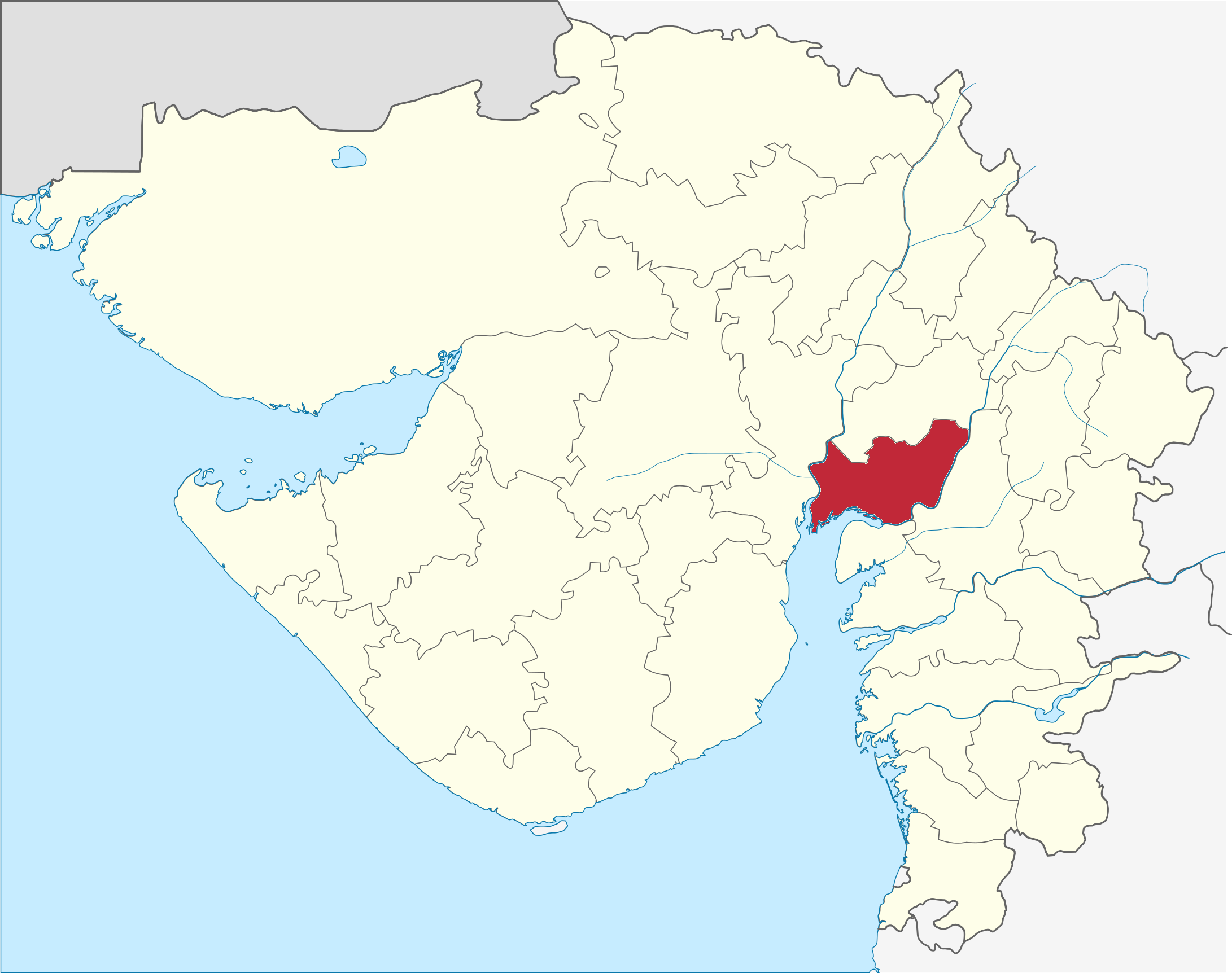
- Location in Gujarat
- Interactive map of Anand district
- Coordinates: 22°36′N 72°54′E
- Country: India
- State: Gujarat
- Established: 2 October 1997
- Headquarters: Anand

Area
  - Total: 3,204 km^{2} (1,237 sq mi)

Population (2023)
  - Total: 2,358,745
  - Rank: 14th in state
  - Density: 736.2/km^{2} (1,907/sq mi)

Languages
  - Official: Gujarati, Hindi
- Time zone: UTC+5:30 (IST)
- Postal code: 388001
- Vehicle registration: GJ-23
- Website: https://ananddp.gujarat.gov.in/Anand

Anand district is an administrative district of Gujarat state in western India and whose popular nickname is Charotar. It was carved out of the Kheda district in 1997. Anand is the administrative headquarters of the district. It is bounded by Kheda District to the north, Vadodara District to the east, Ahmedabad District to the west, and the Gulf of Khambhat to the south. Major towns are Umreth, Khambhat, Tarapur, Petlad, Borsad and Sojitra.

== Demographics ==
Historical population
| Year | Pop. | ±% p.a. |
|---|---|---|
| 1901 | 512,296 | — |
| 1911 | 502,049 | −0.20% |
| 1921 | 509,946 | +0.16% |
| 1931 | 554,746 | +0.85% |
| 1941 | 659,996 | +1.75% |
| 1951 | 796,376 | +1.90% |
| 1961 | 958,629 | +1.87% |
| 1971 | 1,173,757 | +2.05% |
| 1981 | 1,448,666 | +2.13% |
| 1991 | 1,642,615 | +1.26% |
| 2001 | 1,856,872 | +1.23% |
| 2011 | 2,092,745 | +1.20% |

According to the 2011 census, Anand district has a population of 2,092,745 (With total Males 1,088,253 and total Females 1,002,023), roughly equal to the nation of North Macedonia or the US state of New Mexico. This gives it a ranking of 219th in India (out of a total of 640). The district has a population density of 711 inhabitants per square kilometre (1,840/sq mi). Its population growth rate over the decade 2001-2011 was 12.57%. Anand has a sex ratio of 921 females for every 1000 males, and a literacy rate of 85.79% (Males 93.23% and females 77.76%). 30.34% of the population lived in urban areas. Scheduled Castes and Scheduled Tribes made up 4.99% and 1.19% of the population respectively.

Religions in Anand district (2011)
| Religion | Percent |
| Hinduism | 85.95% |
| Islam | 11.99% |
| Christianity | 1.42% |
| Jainism | 0.41% |
| Other or not stated | 0.23% |

Languages of Anand district (2011)
1. Gujarati (96.7%)
2. Hindi (2.10%)
3. Urdu (0.58%)
4. Others (0.66%)

At the time of the 2011 Census of India, 96.66% of the population in the district spoke Gujarati, 2.10% Hindi and 0.58% Urdu as their first language.

== Talukas ==
Anand District is administratively divided into eight talukas or subdistricts: Anand, Anklav, Borsad, Khambhat, Petlad, Sojitra, Tarapur, and Umreth.

== Politics ==
| District | No. | Constituency | Name | Party | Remarks |
|---|---|---|---|---|---|
| Anand | 108 | Khambhat | Chirag Patel | Indian National Congress | Resigned on 19 December 2023 |
| Anand | 108 | Khambhat | Chirag Patel | Bharatiya Janata Party | Elected on 4 June 2024 |
| Anand | 109 | Borsad | Ramanbhai Solanki | Bharatiya Janata Party | |
| Anand | 110 | Anklav | Amit Chavda | Indian National Congress | CLP Leader |
| Anand | 111 | Umreth | Govindbhai Parmar | Bharatiya Janata Party | |
| Anand | 112 | Anand | Yogesh Patel | Bharatiya Janata Party | |
| Anand | 113 | Petlad | Kamlesh Patel | Bharatiya Janata Party | |
| Anand | 114 | Sojitra | Vipul Patel | Bharatiya Janata Party | |

== Points of interest ==
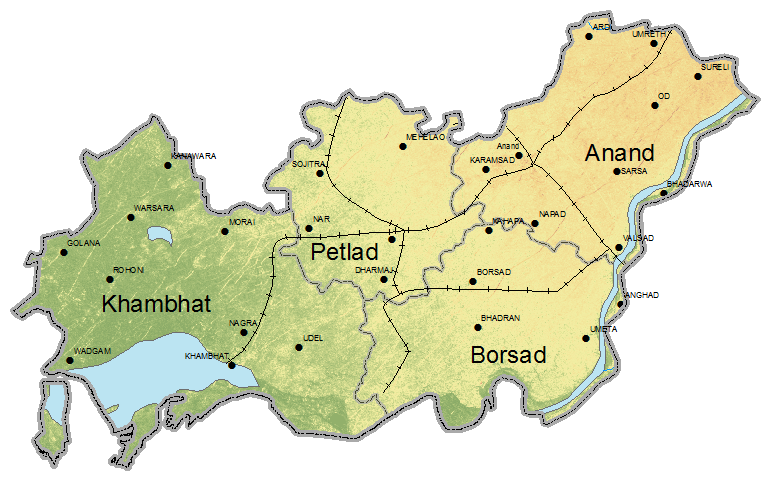
Topographical map of Anand district

- Anand City – birthplace of Tribhuvandas Patel, Founder of Anand Milk Union Limited and Cooperative movement, Milk City.
- Amul – origin of Operation Flood, the White Revolution of India
- National Dairy Development Board – headquarters
- Institute of Rural Management Anand
- Anand Agricultural University
- Sardar Patel University located in Vallabh Vidyanagar in Anand District
- Karamsad – native place of Sardar Patel
- Khambhat – a historic and ancient port in the bay of Khambhat, known for its trade with foreign countries
- Bhadran was given nickname "Paris of Gaekwad state" due to its prosperity and civil works carried by Maharaja Sayajirao Gaekwad III about one century ago
- Umreth – Heritage City for Jainism
- Vadtal

== See also ==
- Bhurakoi
- Finav
- Ode, Gujarat
- Kaniya, Gujarat
- Jol Gujarat
