= List of state highways in Gujarat =

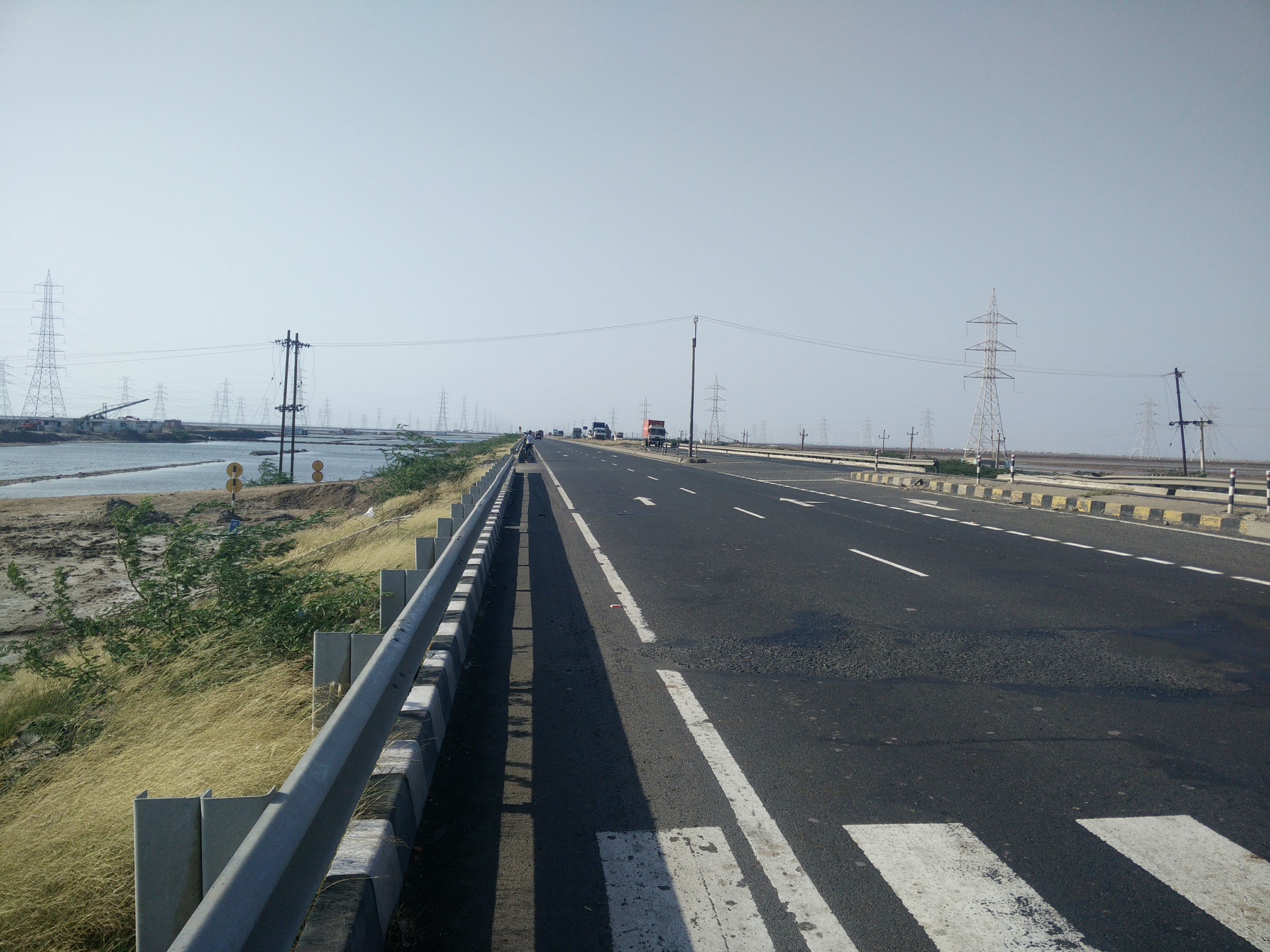
Gujarat State Highway 6

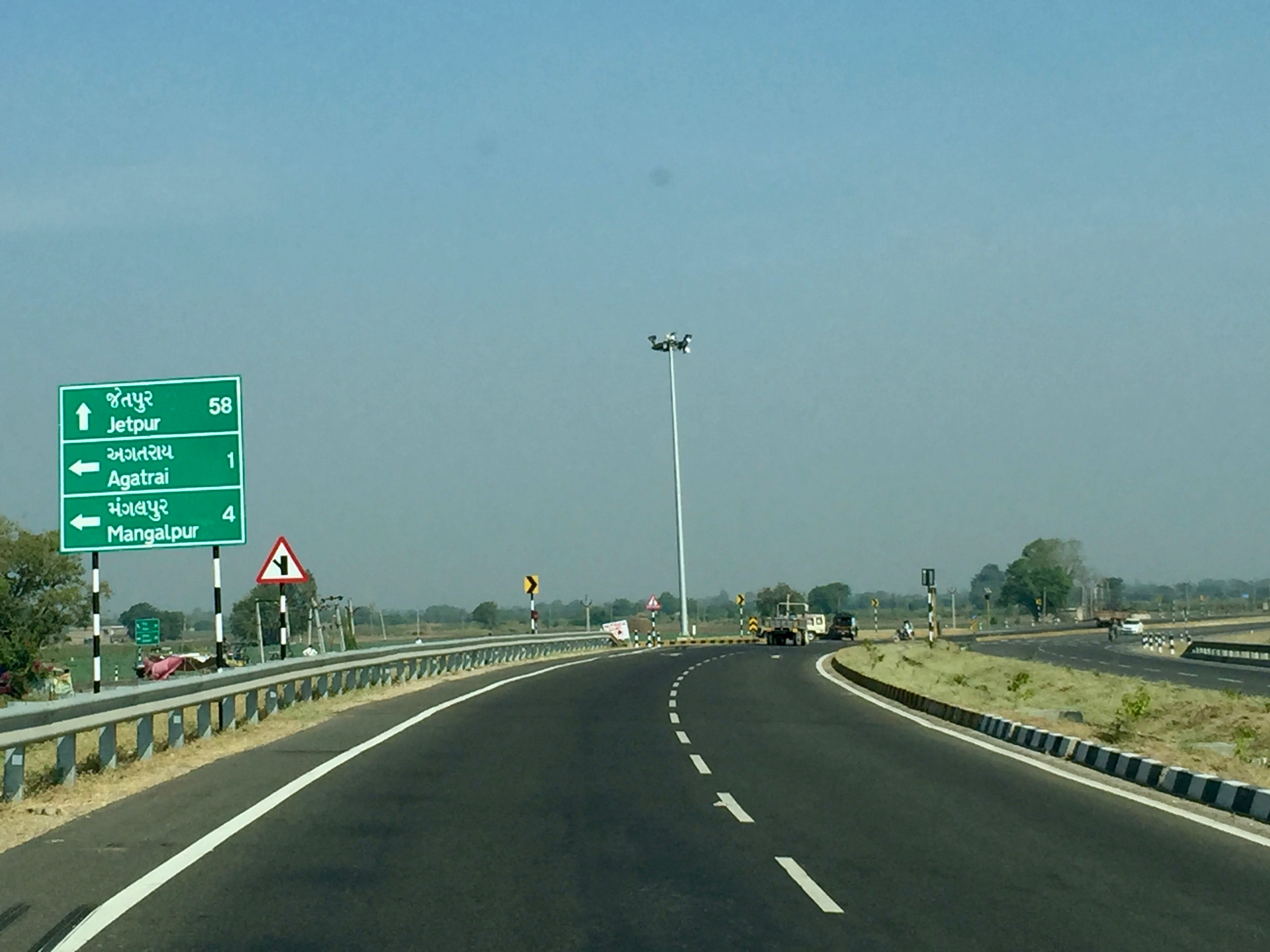
Gujarat state highway 41

Gujarat state is one of the most prosperous state in Western India. It has a good transportation infrastructure with an extensive road network. The Road & Buildings Department (RBD) of Gujarat government is primarily responsible for construction and maintenance of roads including state highways and panchayat roads in Gujarat. This department is operating through 6 wings geographical spread across the state in 34 districts. There are 17 national highways with total length of 4,032 km and more than 300 state highways with total length of 19,761 km in Gujarat.

The state highways are arterial routes of a state, linking district headquarters and important cities/towns within the state and connecting them with national highways or highways of the neighboring states.

== Type of road and its length ==
Type of Road	Length (km)
National highways	4,032
State highways	19,761
Panchayat roads	30,019
Sugarcane roads	1,746

== List of state highways ==
GJ SH No.	Route	District	Total length
GJ SH 1	Bagodara-Dhandhuka–Ranpur–Jasdan–Gondal–Jamkandorna–Bhayavadar–Upleta	Ahmedabad, Botad, Rajkot	0186.67 km
GJ SH 2	Ahmedabad-Kathalal-Lasundra-Balasinor–Lunawada–Santrampur–Zalod	Ahmedabad, Kheda, Mahisagar, Dahod	0116.52 km
GJ SH 2A	Santrampur-Kadana-Dungarpur Road	Mahisagar	0035.17 km
GJ SH 3	Ahmedabad-Mehmdavad-Nadiad	Ahmedabad, Kheda	0032.40 km
GJ SH 4	Ahmedabad–Sarkhej–Dholka-Simaj-Vataman	Ahmedabad	0045.80 km
GJ SH 5	Umargam-Vapi-Dharampur-Vansda-Dolvan-Valod-Mandvi-Netrang-Rajpipla-Garudeshwar-Nasvadi-Bodeli-Jambughoda-Halol–Kalol-Godhra–Shehera-Lunawada–Malpur–Modasa–Shamlaji	Valsad, Navsari, Tapi, Surat, Bharuch, Narmada, Chhota Udepur, Panchmahal, Mahisagar, Aravalli	0332.20 km
GJ SH 5A	Pavagadh Hill Road	Panchmahal	0005.20 km
GJ SH 5B	Godhra Link Road	Panchmahal	0007.31 km
GJ SH 6	Lakhpat-Koteshwar-Narayan Sarovar-Naliya-Mandvi–Mundra-Anjar-Gandhidham-Maliya Miyana-Jodia-Jamnagar–Khambhalia–Dwarka–Porbandar-Mangrol-Somnath-Kodinar-Una–Rajula-Mahuva-Talaja-Bhavnagar–(NH51)Khambhat-Borsad-Jambusar-Amod-Dahej–Bharuch–Ankleshwar-Hansot-Olpad-Surat–Navsari-Jalalpore-Bilimora-Valsad-Tithal	Kutch, Morbi, Jamnagar, Devbhoomi Dwarka, Porbandar, Junagadh, Gir Somnath, Amreli, Bhavnagar, Ahmedabad, Anand, Vadodara, Bharuch, Surat, Navsari, Valsad	1214.32 km
GJ SH 7	Maliya-Halvad–Dhrangadhra–Viramgam-Sitapur-Becharaji–Chanasma–Patan	Kutch, Morbi, Surendranagar, Ahmedabad, Mehsana, Patan	0043.60 km
GJ SH 8	Bagodra-Vataman–Tarapur–Dharmaj–Borsad–Vasad	Ahmedabad, Anand	0101.76 km
GJ SH 9	Waghai–Saputara	Dang	0052.00 km
GJ SH 10	Harij–Patan-Siddhpur-Kheralu-Sipor-Valasana-Idar-Dholvani-Bhiloda-Vijaynagar to Rajasthan Border	Patan, Mahesana, Sabarkantha, Aravalli	0112.32 km
GJ SH 11	Borsad-Umeta-Singhrot-Gotri-Vadodara–Dabhoi–Bodeli– Jetpur-Pavi-Chhota Udaipur up to State Border to Alirajpur in MP	Anand, Vadodara, Chhota Udaipur	0148.20 km
GJ SH 12	Nadiad-Lingada-Umreth–Dakor-Thasara-Godhra-Kathwada up to State Border to Jhabua in MP	Kheda, Anand, Vadodara, Panchmahal, Dahod	0058.75 km
GJ SH 13	Ankleshwar-Valia-Netrang-Dediapada-Sagbara up to State Border to Akkalkuva in Maharashtra	Bharuch, Narmada	0108.40 km
GJ SH 14	Waghai–Ahwa-Chinchali-Babulghat	Dang	0070.40 km
GJ SH 15	Bilimora–Chikhli–Vansda–Waghai	Navsari, Dang	0055.00 km
GJ SH 16	Bagodara-Dholka-Rasikpura-Kheda-Khambhat	Ahmedabad, Kheda, Anand	0108.20 km
GJ SH 17	Ahmedabad–Sarkhej–Sanand–TATA Nano Factory at Charodi–Viramgam–Wadhwan-Muli-Chotila	Ahmedabad, Surendranagar, Rajkot	0058.60 km
GJ SH 18	Viramgam-Mandal-Dasada-Panchasar-Sami-Harij–Radhanpur	Ahmedabad, Patan	0079.40 km
GJ SH 19	Surendranagar–Patdi-Dasada-Becharaji–Mehsana	Surendranagar, Mehsana	0106.00 km
GJ SH 20	Dhrangadhra–Dudhrej–Surendranagar–Limbdi–Dhandhuka	Surendranagar, Ahmedabad	0099.60 km
GJ SH 21	Halvad-Sara-Muli-Sayala-Sudamada-Paliyad-Botad–Gadhada–Dhasa–Damnagar-Paravadi-Gariadhar-Jesar-Asarana-Dungar-Victor-Port Chanch	Surendranagar, Bhavnagar, Amreli	0169.70 km
GJ SH 22	Halvad–Morvi-Tankara-Latipur-Dhrol-Jambuda	Surendranagar, Rajkot, Jamnagar	0105.10 km
GJ SH 23	Rajkot-Kalawad-Khatiya-Lalpur-Khambhalia	Rajkot, Jamnagar	0073.10 km
GJ SH 24	Rajkot–Morvi–Navalakhi	Rajkot, Jamnagar	0125.32 km
GJ SH 25	Bhavnagar-Shihor-Dhasa-Babra-Atkot-Rajkot	132 km	
GJ SH 26	Bedeshwar-Jamnagar-Kalawad-Jamkandorana-Dhoraji–Junagadh-Mendarada-Sasan-Talala-Veraval	Rajkot, Jamnagar, Junagadh	0121.40 km
GJ SH 27	Jamnagar-Lalpur-Ranavav–NH8B–Bhanvad	Jamnagar, Porbandar	0108.90 km
GJ SH 28	Khambhalia-Advana-Porbandar	Jamnagar, Porbandar	0062.70 km
GJ SH 29	Limbdi-Vankvaya-Bhatiya-Kuranga	Surendranagar, Jamnagar	0022.00 km
GJ SH 30	Junagadh-Khadia-Bilkha-Bagasara–Amreli	Junagadh, Amreli	0076.30 km
GJ SH 31	Chorvad-Holiday Camp-Gadu-Keshod–Vanthali–Junagadh-Jetpur-Devda-Vasavad-Babra-Bhadeli-Gadhada-Umrali-Songadh-Palitana–Talaja	Rajkot, Junagadh, Amreli, Bhavnagar	0298.35 km
GJ SH 31A	Porbandar–Rajkot–Bamanbore Road Passing Through Jetpur City Limit	Rajkot, Porbandar	0008.05 km
GJ SH 32	Vanthali-Marmat-Galvav-Manavadar-Bantwa-Kutiyana		
GJ SH 33	Chalala-Dhari-Jamawala-Kodinar		
GJ SH 34	Jafarabad-Rajula-Kundla		
GJ SH 35	Mahuva-Ghadhakda-Badhada		
GJ SH 36	Vartej-Vallabhipur-Barwala-Dhandhuka		
GJ SH 37	Manar-Khadshaliya-Kuda-Bhavnagar		
GJ SH 38	Vallbhipur-Botad-becomes new Trunk road NH-51 to Ranpur and Limbdi-then becomes SH-38 to Lakhtar		
GJ SH 39	Vallabhipur-Umrala-Bhojavadar		
GJ SH 40	Pipli-Kamiyala-Dhanala-Fedta		0012.02 km
GJ SH 41	Ahmedabad–Mahesana–Sidhpur–Palanpur	Ahmedabad, Gandhinagar, Mahesana, Patan, Banaskantha	131.33 km
GJ SH 42	Bachau-Dhamadka-Duhai-Dhaneti-Ajarakpur-Bhujodi-Madhapar-Bhuj-Mirzapur-Sukhapur-Samatra-Desalpar-Manjal-Nakhatrana-Navgiri-Dayapur-Gaduli-Lakhpat turns into new NH754		0194.13 km
GJ SH 43	Dahinsara-Rampar-Ludava-Rajpar-Ghadsisa-Devpar-Kotda(Roha)-BhojrajVandh-NandraMota-Mothala		
GJ SH 44	Mangvana-Jiyapar-Vadva-Dujapar-Ghadsisa-Sherdi-Mandvi	Mandvi, Bhuj	0043.13 km
GJ SH 45	KunvarBet-Khavda-Bhirandiara-Lotia-Sarspar-Bhuj	Bhuj, RannofKaacchha	0092.90 km
GJ SH 46	Kukma-Anjar-Shinay		0040.70 km
GJ SH 47	Mirzapur-Meghpar-Godpar-Dahinsara-Dhunai-Punadi-Asambiya-Goniyasar-Jakhaniya-Talvana-Kodai-Mandvi via NH41	Mandvi, Bhuj	0043.20 km
GJ SH 48	Mundra-Baraya-Babiya-Kera-Baladiya-Surajpar-Bhuj	Mundra, Bhuj	0050.85 km
GJ SH 49			
GJ SH 50			
GJ SH 51			
GJ SH 52			
GJ SH 53			
GJ SH 54	Deesa - Tharad - Mitha		
GJ SH 55			
GJ SH 56	Mehsana-Visnagar-Ambaji	Mehsana, Banaskantha	0113.00 km
GJ SH 57			
GJ SH 58			
GJ SH 59	Nadiad–Mahudha-Kathalal-Kapadwanj-Bayad-Dhansura–Modasa-Raighad	Kheda, Sabarkantha	0127.20 km
GJ SH 60	Kheda-Mahmdavad-Mahudha-Alina-Dakor–Umreth-Bhalej-Anand–Vadtal	Kheda, Anand	0090.59 km
GJ SH 61			
GJ SH 62			
GJ SH 63			
GJ SH 64			
GJ SH 65			
GJ SH 66			
GJ SH 67			
GJ SH 68			
GJ SH 69			
GJ SH 70			
GJ SH 71			
GJ SH 72			
GJ SH 73			
GJ SH 74			
GJ SH 75			
GJ SH 76			
GJ SH 77			
GJ SH 78			
GJ SH 79			
GJ SH 80	Ahwa–Navapur up to State Border in Maharashtra	Dang	0062.40 km
GJ SH 81			
GJ SH 82			
GJ SH 83	Umreth-Ode-Sarsa-Anand–Karamsad–Sojitra–Tarapur-Kanawada	Anand, Ahmedabad	0070.60 km
GJ SH 84			
GJ SH 85			
GJ SH 86			
GJ SH 87			
GJ SH 88	Varjakhan-Bardoli-Navsari-Gandevi-Bilimora	Surat, Navsari	0080.50 km
GJ SH 89			
GJ SH 90			
GJ SH 91	Bhedi (Pay)-Kanakpar-Mothala		0021.06 km
GJ SH 92			
GJ SH 93			
GJ SH 94			
GJ SH 95			
GJ SH 96			
GJ SH 97			
GJ SH 98			
GJ SH 99			
GJ SH 100			
GJ SH 101			
GJ SH 102			
GJ SH 103			
GJ SH 104			
GJ SH 105			
GJ SH			
GJ SH			
GJ SH			
GJ SH			
GJ SH 110	Amreli-Kunkavav-Vadiya Liliya Mota -Lathi		52.5 km
GJ SH			
GJ SH			
GJ SH			
GJ SH			
GJ SH 140	Bareja-Navagam-Vasna-Bujarg-Kheda-Matar-Limbdi-Sojitra-Piplav-Petlad–Borsad	Ahmedabad, Kheda, Anand	0075.03 km
GJ SH 141			
GJ SH 142			
GJ SH 143	Majara-Talod-Harsol-Ranasan-Gambhaoi-Bamna-Vankaner	Sabarkantha	0084.30 km
GJ SH 144			
GJ SH 145	Himatnagar-Dhansura-Malpur-Meghraj-Titoi-Shamlaji-Bhiloda-Idar	Sabarkantha	0152.77 km
GJ SH			
GJ SH 160	Padra-Sadhli-Karjan-Vemar-Sinor-Poicha-Rajpipla-Dediapada Road Bridge & Approaches	Vadodara, Narmada	0084.85 km
GJ SH 173	Songadh-Hindla-Chimer-Otta	Tapi	0053.10 km
	Total		19814 km

== Expressways ==
The Expressways in Gujarat are:

- Amritsar–Jamnagar Expressway (NH-754A), 1,257 km long 6-lane expressway passes Punjab, Haryana, Rajasthan and Gujarat.
- Ahmedabad–Dholera Expressway, 103 km long.
- Ahmedabad–Vadodara Expressway, 93 km long expressway connects to Delhi–Mumbai Expressway at Vadodara.
- Delhi–Mumbai Expressway, 1,350 km long 8-lane wide (expandable to 12-lane) expressway.
  - Mumbai–Vadodara Expressway, 1,350 km long 8-lane (expandable to 12-lane) expressway
    - Bamroli–Althan Expressway in Surat, 7 km long spur to Surat from Mumbai–Vadodara Expressway.
    - Gaurav Path in Surat, over 2 km long spur as extension of Bamroli–Althan Expressway.
- Surat–Chennai Expressway 1,271 km (790 mi) long 6-lane access-controlled expressway expressway pass through 6 states: Gujarat, Maharashtra, Karnataka, Telangana, Andhra Pradesh and Tamil Nadu.
- Namo Shakti Expressway (Deesa–Pipavav Expressway): From North Gujarat to Saurashtra coast.
- Dwarka–Somnath Expressway

== High-speed corridors ==
Garvi Gujarat High-Speed Corridors in Gujarat are 12 high-speed corridors of total 1,367 km length being developed across all 5 major regions of Gujarat which are designated stretches of existing highways with upgraded infrastructure to enable faster travel times, typically featuring multiple lanes, controlled access, and minimal traffic disruptions, effectively creating a network of efficient transportation routes across the state. Regions are listed from north clockwise:

- North Gujarat
  - Mehsana-Palanpur High-speed Corridor: 70 km corridor in North Gujarat.
  - Tharad-Deesa-Mehsana High-speed Corridor:
- Central Gujarat (central-east side of Gujarat)
  - Ahamdabad-Dakor High-speed Corridor: nearly 75 km long corridor east of Ahamdabad as shortest route to NH-47.
  - Vadodara-Ektanagar High-speed Corridor (Vadodara-Kevadia High-speed Corridor): over 90 km long corridor from Delhi-Mumbai Expressway near Vadodara direct to Statue of Unity in southeast.
  - Surat-Sachin-Navsari High-speed Corridor: 33 km upgrade of State Highway south of Surat.
- South Gujarat (southeastern part of Gujarat)
  - Ankleshwar-Rajpipla High-speed Corridor: Bharuch district to Narmada district.
- Saurashtra (southwestern part of Gujarat)
  - Rajkot-Bhavnagar High-speed Corridor: nearly 75 km long corridor in Saurashtra (southwest Gujarat).

- Kutch (western part of Gujarat)
  - Expand?

== See also ==
- Expressways of India
- List of megaprojects in India
