= Bhavnath Temple, Mau =

Coordinates: 23.73719°N 73.19892°E

Bhavnath Temple

Religion
- Affiliation: Hinduism
- District: Aravalli district
- Deity: Lord Shiva

Location
- Location: Mau village of Bhiloda Taluka
- State: Gujarat
- Country: India
- Interactive map of Bhavnath Temple

Architecture
- Completed: 1300 years old

Bhavnath Temple is an ancient temple dedicated to Shiva in Mau village of Bhiloda Taluka of Aravalli district, Gujarat, India.

It is situated 6 km away from Bhiloda and is about 1300 years old acknowledged from an inscription. There is a reservoir, kund, named Bhrigukund which believed to cure leprosy if bathed in its water. There is a temple dedicated to Shiva and temple dedicated to the son of Bhrigu, Avan Rishi. The place is situated on the banks of Hathmati River dam. The fair is organised on the last Monday of Shraavana month of Hindu calendar and on Mahashivratri which is visited by large number of people.

The temple is now located amid reservoir of dam on Indrasi River.
