= Meghraj =

Meghraj (Arvalli)
- Town
- Location in Gujarat, India Meghraj (Arvalli) (India)
- Coordinates: 23.5°N 73.5°E
- Country: India
- State: Gujarat
- District: Aravalli district
- Founder: Raja Meghar Bhil
- Elevation: 178 m (584 ft)

Population (2011)
  - Total: 11,363

Languages
  - Official language: Gujarati
  - Spoken languages (Organised alphabetically): English; Hindustani; Marwari
- Time zone: UTC+5:30 (IST)
- PIN: 383350
- Vehicle registration: GJ-31
- Literacy: 86.05%
- Website: gujaratindia.com

Meghraj is a town in the Indian state of Gujarat.

== Geography ==
Meghraj is a Taluka in Aravalli District. It is located 22 km west of District headquarters Modasa and 108 km from state capital Gandhinagar towards west.

Meghraj Taluka is bounded by Malpur Taluka on the South, Modasa Taluka on the west, Simalwara Taluka on the East. Nearby towns are Modasa City, Lunawada City, Sagwara City.

Meghraj consists of 279 Villages and 43 Panchayats.

Dungarpur, Sabarkantha, Gandhinagar, Banswara, Dahod, Shamlaji, Majum Dam, Kaleshwari, and Kadana Dam are nearby tourist destinations.

== Demographics ==
As of 2011 India census, Meghraj had a population of 11,363 including 5,834 males and 5,529 females. Children age 0-6 numbered 1,343, or 11.82%. The female sex ratio is 948 against the state average of 919. The child-sex ratio is around 784 compared to Gujarat state average of 890. Literacy is 86.05%, higher than the state average of 78.03%. Male literacy is around 92.68% while the female rate is 79.23%.

The town hosts 2,401 houses that it supplies with water and sewerage.

== Governance ==
It is authorized to build roads and impose taxes on properties under its jurisdiction.

== History ==
In 1526 Sultan Bahadur visited Meghraj (Mahmud Nagar), en route to Ahmedabad after the death of his brother Sultan Sikandar Shah.

In 1528 Sultan Bahadur Shah again visited., That time the King of Dungarpur came to welcome Sultan Bahadur Shah.

== Etymology ==
The name of the city comes from the name of Thakur Sahab Shri Meghrajsinhji s/o Hamrajsinhji in the Samvant 1410. They established a state of 42 villages under Meghraj and then shifted to Moti Mori in Samvant 1601 and established a state of 62 villages.

== Temples ==
Temples include Gayatri Temple, Hanuman Temple, Gheli Mata Temple, Ambe Mata Temple Mahadev Temple, Shree Nathji Temple, Roleshwar Mahadev Temple, Nana-Nani Garden, and Newly made Jala-Sai Temple.

== Masjid ==
Masjids include Jumma Masjid, Masjide Raza, Ashrafi Masjid, Tanvir Masjid, Madina Masjid, Ashrafiya Darool Qir'aat, Chishtiya Darbar and Babe Noorul Ain Gate. Nureilahi masjid (kasba). Nureilahi Madrsa, Kasba.

== Sufi Saints ==
- Syed Jahangir baba, Khalifa of Dariyai Dulha (virpur)
- Ali ji Wali ji, (Modasa road)
- Saat Syed baba, (at hills)
- Shah baba also known as a Moriwale pir baba, (behind bus station)
- Bakshu Shahid ( opp. library)
- Ogan Syed (Kasba)
