= P. C. Baranda =

Indian politician

Punamchand Chanabhai Baranda (born 1959) is an Indian politician from Gujarat. He is a member of the Gujarat Legislative Assembly from Bhiloda Assembly constituency, which is reserved for Scheduled Tribe community, in Aravalli district. He won the 2022 Gujarat Legislative Assembly election representing the Bharatiya Janata Party.

== Early life and education ==
Baranda is from Bhiloda, Aravalli district, Gujarat. He is the son of Chanabhai Baranda. He completed his BA in 1984 at a college affiliated with Gujarat University and later did LLB at North Gujarat University Patan in 1988. He retired as Superintendent of Police and his wife is a former district collector.

== Career ==
Baranda won from Bhiloda Assembly constituency representing the Bharatiya Janata Party in the 2022 Gujarat Legislative Assembly election. He polled 90,396 votes and defeated his nearest rival, Rupsinh Bhagoda of the Aam Aadmi Party, by a margin of 28,768 votes. He contested the 2017 Gujarat Legislative Assembly election, also on the BJP ticket, but lost to Anil Joshiyara of the Indian National Congress by a margin of 12,417 votes.
