= List of districts of Gujarat =

Districts of Gujarat
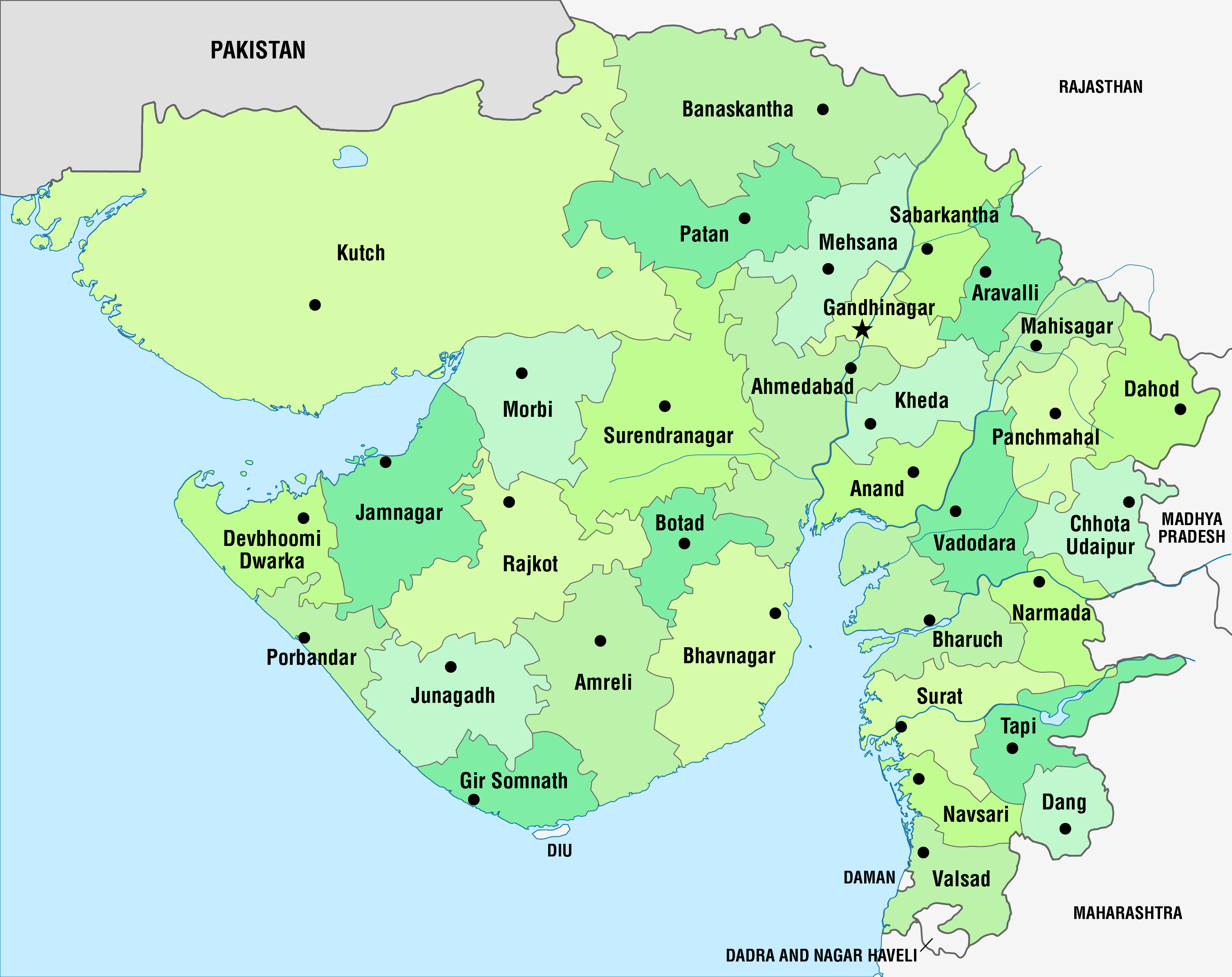
- Districts of Gujarat
- Category: Districts
- Location: Gujarat
- Number: 34 districts
- Populations: Dang – 228,291 (lowest); Ahmedabad – 7,214,225 (highest)
- Areas: Dang – 1,764 km^{2} (681 sq mi) (smallest); Kutch – 45,674 km^{2} (17,635 sq mi) (largest)
- Government: Government of Gujarat
- Subdivisions: Talukas of Gujarat; Cities of Gujarat; Metropolitan areas of Gujarat

The western Indian state of Gujarat has 34 districts after several splits of the original 17 districts at the formation of the state in 1960. Kutch is the largest district of Gujarat while Dang is the smallest. Ahmedabad is the most populated district while Dang is the least. There are 251 Talukas (subdivisions of districts) in Gujarat.

The district administration is headed by the District Collector, an Indian Administrative Service (IAS) officer appointed by the government. The Collector is assisted by Additional Collectors and Deputy Collectors at the district (collectorate) level, Prant Officers (Sub-Divisional Magistrates) at the subdivision (prant) level, and Mamlatdars at the taluka level.

== History ==
=== 1960 ===
Gujarat state was created on 1 May 1960, out of the 17 northern districts of Bombay State when that was split on a linguistic basis (also creating Marathi speaking Maharashtra).

They are as follow : Ahmedabad, Amreli, Banaskantha, Bharuch, Bhavnagar, Dang, Jamnagar, Junagadh, Kheda, Kachchh, Mehsana, Panchmahal, Rajkot, Sabarkantha, Surat, Surendranagar and Vadodara.

=== 1964 ===
In 1964, Gandhinagar was formed from parts of Ahmedabad and Mehsana.

=== 1966 ===
In 1966, Valsad was split from Surat.

=== 1997 ===
On 2 October 1997, five new districts were created:

- Anand was split from Kheda.
- Dahod was split from Panchmahal.
- Narmada was split from Bharuch.
- Navsari was split from Valsad.
- Porbandar was split from Junagadh.

=== 2000 ===
In 2000, Patan District was formed from parts of Banaskantha and Mehsana.

=== 2007 ===
On 2 October 2007, Tapi was split from Surat, as the state's 26th district.

=== 2013 ===
On 15 August 2013, seven new districts were created:

- Aravalli was split from Sabarkantha.
- Botad was created from parts of Ahmedabad and Bhavanagar districts.
- Chhota Udaipur was split from Vadodara District.
- Devbhoomi Dwarka was split from Jamnagar.
- Mahisagar was created from parts of Kheda and Panchmahal.
- Morbi was created from parts of Rajkot and Surendranagar districts.
- Gir Somnath was split from Junagadh.

=== 2025 ===
On 2nd October 2025, Vav-Tharad was formed from parts of Banaskantha

== List of districts ==
Sl No	District	Code	Headquarters	Established	Area (km^{2})	Population (2011)	Population Density (/km^{2})	Location Map
1	Banaskantha	BK	Palanpur	1 May 1960	6,176	2,141,666	290	
2	Aravalli	AR	Modasa	15 August 2013	3,217	1,051,746	327	
3	Patan	PA	Patan	2 October 2000	5,738	1,342,746	234	
4	Gandhinagar	GA	Gandhinagar	1 May 1964	2,163	1,387,478	660	
5	Mehsana	MA	Mehsana	1 May 1960	4,386	2,027,727	462	
6	Sabarkantha	SK	Himmatnagar	1 May 1960	7,390	2,458,589	328	
7	Vav-Tharad		Tharad	2 October 2025	6,527	978,840	220	
8	Ahmedabad	AH	Ahmedabad	1 May 1960	7,170	7,208,200	890	
9	Anand	AN	Anand	2 October 1997	2,942	2,090,276	711	
10	Chhota Udaipur	CU	Chhota Udaipur	15 August 2013	3,237	1,071,831	331	
11	Dahod	DA	Dahod	2 October 1997	3,642	2,126,558	582	
12	Kheda	KH	Nadiad	1 May 1960	3,667	2,298,934	541	
13	Mahisagar	MH	Lunawada	15 August 2013	2,500	994,624	440	
14	Panchmahal	PM	Godhra	1 May 1960	5,219	2,388,267	458	
15	Vadodara	VD	Vadodara	1 May 1960	4,312	3,639,775	467	
16	Surat	ST	Surat	1 May 1960	4,418	6,081,322	953	
17	Bharuch	BR	Bharuch	1 May 1960	6,524	1,550,822	238	
18	Dang	DG	Ahwa	1 May 1960	1,764	226,769	129	
19	Narmada	NR	Rajpipla	2 October 1997	2,749	590,379	214	
20	Navsari	NV	Navsari	2 October 1997	2,211	1,330,711	602	
21	Tapi	TA	Vyara	2 October 2007	3,435	806,489	249	
22	Valsad	VL	Valsad	1 June 1966	3,034	1,703,068	561	
23	Rajkot	RA	Rajkot	1 May 1960	11,203	3,157,676	282	
24	Amreli	AM	Amreli	1 May 1960	6,760	1,513,614	205	
25	Bhavnagar	BV	Bhavnagar	1 May 1960	11,155	2,877,961	288	
26	Botad	BT	Botad	15 August 2013	2,564	656,005	256	
27	Devbhoomi Dwarka	DD	Khambhaliya	15 August 2013	5,684	752,484	132	
28	Gir Somnath	GS	Veraval	15 August 2013	3,754	1,217,477	324	
29	Jamnagar	JA	Jamnagar	1 May 1960	14,125	2,159,130	153	
30	Junagadh	JU	Junagadh	1 May 1960	8,839	2,742,291	310	
31	Kutch	KA	Bhuj	1 May 1960	45,652	2,090,313	46	
32	Morbi	MB	Morbi	15 August 2013	4,871	960,329	197	
33	Porbandar	PO	Porbandar	2 October 1997	2,294	586,062	255	
34	Surendranagar	SN	Surendranagar	1 May 1960	10,489	1,755,873	167	

== Demands for new districts ==
The government of Gujarat has periodically evaluated proposals to carve out new administrative districts to decentralize governance, manage urban expansion, and improve administrative efficiency in geographically large regions.

List of Proposed Districts in Gujarat Grouped by Current District
Proposed District	Proposed HQ	Expected Area of Jurisdiction and Rationale
Proposed from Kutch
East Kutch	Gandhidham	Eastern part of the current Kutch district (approx. 55 km southeast of Bhuj). Kutch is the largest district in the state and has already operated with two separate police districts (East and West) since 2009. This proposal aims to formalize the administrative split for better governance.
West Kutch	Nakhatrana or Mandvi	Western part of the current Kutch district. Proposed alongside East Kutch to decentralize the administration from Bhuj (which would remain the headquarters of a smaller, central Bhuj district).
Proposed from Patan
Radhanpur	Radhanpur	Northwestern Gujarat, located approximately 60 km west of Patan city.
Proposed from Mehsana
Vadnagar	Vadnagar	Northwestern Gujarat, located approximately 40 km northeast of Mehsana city and 60 km east of Patan.
Proposed from Ahmedabad
Ahmedabad City	Ahmedabad	Central Gujarat region. Proposed to separate the dense urban administration of the municipal corporation area from the surrounding rural and industrial tracts.
Viramgam	Viramgam	Central Gujarat region, located approximately 60 km west of Ahmedabad city.
Dholera	Dholera	Central Gujarat region, located approximately 100 km south of Ahmedabad city. Proposed to establish a dedicated administrative presence for the region's industrial and infrastructure development.
Proposed from Bhavnagar
Mahuva	Mahuva	Eastern Saurashtra region, located approximately 95 km south of Bhavnagar city.

== Regions ==
The five regions of Gujarat are as follows (clockwise from north):

- North Gujarat (Northern part of Gujarat):comprises districts of Banaskantha, Mehsana, Sabarkantha, Gandhinagar, Patan, Aravalli and Vav-Tharad
- Central Gujarat (central-east side of Gujarat): comprises districts of Ahmedabad, Kheda, Panchmahal, Vadodara, Anand, Dahod, Chhota Udaipur and Mahisagar
- South Gujarat (southeastern part of Gujarat): comprises districts of Bharuch, Dang, Surat, Valsad, Narmada, Navsari and Tapi
- Saurashtra (southwestern part of Gujarat): comprises districts of Amreli, Bhavnagar, Jamnagar, Junagadh, Rajkot, Surendranagar, Porbandar, Botad, Devbhoomi Dwarka, Gir Somnath and Morbi
- Kutch (western part of Gujarat): comprises district of Kutch.

== See also ==
- India
- Gujarat
- Government of Gujarat
- List of cities in Gujarat by population
- List of metropolitan areas in Gujarat
- List of million-plus urban agglomerations in India
- List of states and union territories of India by population
