= Prantvel =

Village in Gujarat state, India

Prantvel is a village in Bayad Taluka in Aravalli district of Gujarat state, India.

== Places of interest ==
On a raised platform near village, three memorial stones, and round the platform thirty or forty graves. The people say that the stones were raised, and are now worshipped, by the wandering tribe of Chamthas.
