= Malpur State =

Princely state of the British Raj

Coordinates: 23°21′20″N 73°28′30″E

Malpur State માલપુર
- Princely State of British India
- 1466–1943
- Flag
- Capital: Malpur
- Area
  - 1931: 251.23 km^{2} (97.00 sq mi)
- Population
  - 1931: 13,552
- History
  - Established: 1466
  - Attachment Scheme and merger with Baroda State: 1943
Succeeded by
Baroda State

Malpur State (Gujarati: માલપુર; Hindi: मालपुर) was a small princely state belonging to the Mahi Kantha Agency of the Bombay Presidency during the era of the British Raj. It was centered on Malpur town, in present-day Aravalli district of Gujarat State.

== History ==
Malpur State was founded in 1466, but little is known about its early history.According to local belief, the village of Malpur is said to have been named after Mala Khant, who was an early local ruler of the area. Rawal Virajmal, son of Rao Kiratsinghji of Idar State, was succeeded on 12 April 1882 by his son Rawal Dipsinhji Sheosinhji, born in 1863.

Malpur State was merged with Baroda State under the Attachment Scheme in December 1943. The last ruler was Rawal Shri Gambhirsinhji Himatsinhji, born 27 October 1914 and who acceded to the throne on 23 June 1923. He was educated at Scott College, Sadra and Mayo College, Ajmer and nominally ruled till 1947 while the process for joining India was active. Finally Baroda State acceded to the Indian Union on 1 May 1949.

=== Rulers ===
The rulers of Malpur State bore the title Raol.

- ???? –1780 ....
- 1780–1796 Indrasinhji
- 1796 Jamalsinhji (d. 1796)
- 1796–1816 Takhtsinhji Jamalsinhji
- 1816 –1822 Shivsinhji I
- 1822–1843 .... -Manager
- 1843–18.. Dipsinhji I (b. 1822 – d. 18..)
- 1875–1882 Shivsinhji II Khumansinhji (1841–1882)
- 12 Apr 1882 – 1914 Dipsinhji II (1863–1914)
- 1914–1923 Jaswatsinhji Dipsinhji (1886–1923)
- 23 Jun 1923 – 1947 Gambhirsinhji Himmatsinhji (1914–1969)
- 23 Jun 1923 – 1935 .... -Manager
- 11 May 1969 Gambhirsinhji Himmatsinhji (died)
- Present Chief of the Ruling Family and Maha Raolji – Saheb Shri Krishnasinhji (b. 1954)

== See also ==
- List of Rajput dynasties and states
- Baroda and Gujarat States Agency
- Political integration of India
