= Limbhoi =

- Village
- Location in Gujarat, India Limbhoi (India)
- Coordinates: 23.29°N 73.13°E
- Country: India
- State: Gujarat
- District: Aravalli

Area
  - Total: .5 km^{2} (0.19 sq mi)
- Elevation: 207 m (679 ft)

Population (2011)
  - Total: 3,000
- Time zone: UTC+5:30 (IST)
- PIN: 383316
- Vehicle registration: GJ-31

Limbhoi is a village in Modasa Taluka in Aravalli district of Gujarat state, India, north of Aravalli Range.

The temple of Kalnath Mahadev is located behind the hill fort. It measures thirty-seven feet long by fifteen feet broad by thirty feet high, and includes a partially ruined rest-house built of white sandstone and plastered brick.

The population numbers around 3000.
