= Red Rickshaw Revolution =

The Red rickshaw Revolution (RRR) is an initiative launched by the Vodafone Foundation in India to empower women for social development in India. The revolution was started on 9 March 2013, when three women riding a red autorickshaw departed from Delhi to reach Mumbai on 18 March 2013. The rickshaws will pass through Delhi, Haryana, Rajasthan, Gujarat and Maharashtra to raise money for NGOs working to empower Indian women.

== Participants ==
The Red rickshaw Revolution was launched by Laura Turkington, Director of the Vodafone Foundation in India, Carina Deegan, who supports the Foundation's activities and Sunita Chaudhary, first female auto rickshaw driver in Delhi NCR.

== Events ==
The Red rickshaw, which departed with three women on 9 March, will pass through cities like Alwar, Jaipur, Ajmer, Rajsamand, Shamlaji, Ahmedabad, Vadodara, Surat, Daman and Mumbai. The Revolution will raise funds for three NGOs, Apne Aap Women’s Collective (AAWC), Breakthrough and Corp India. The initiative also aims to educate women about their rights, and share the stories of successful women.
