= Mazum reservoir =

Mazum Dam
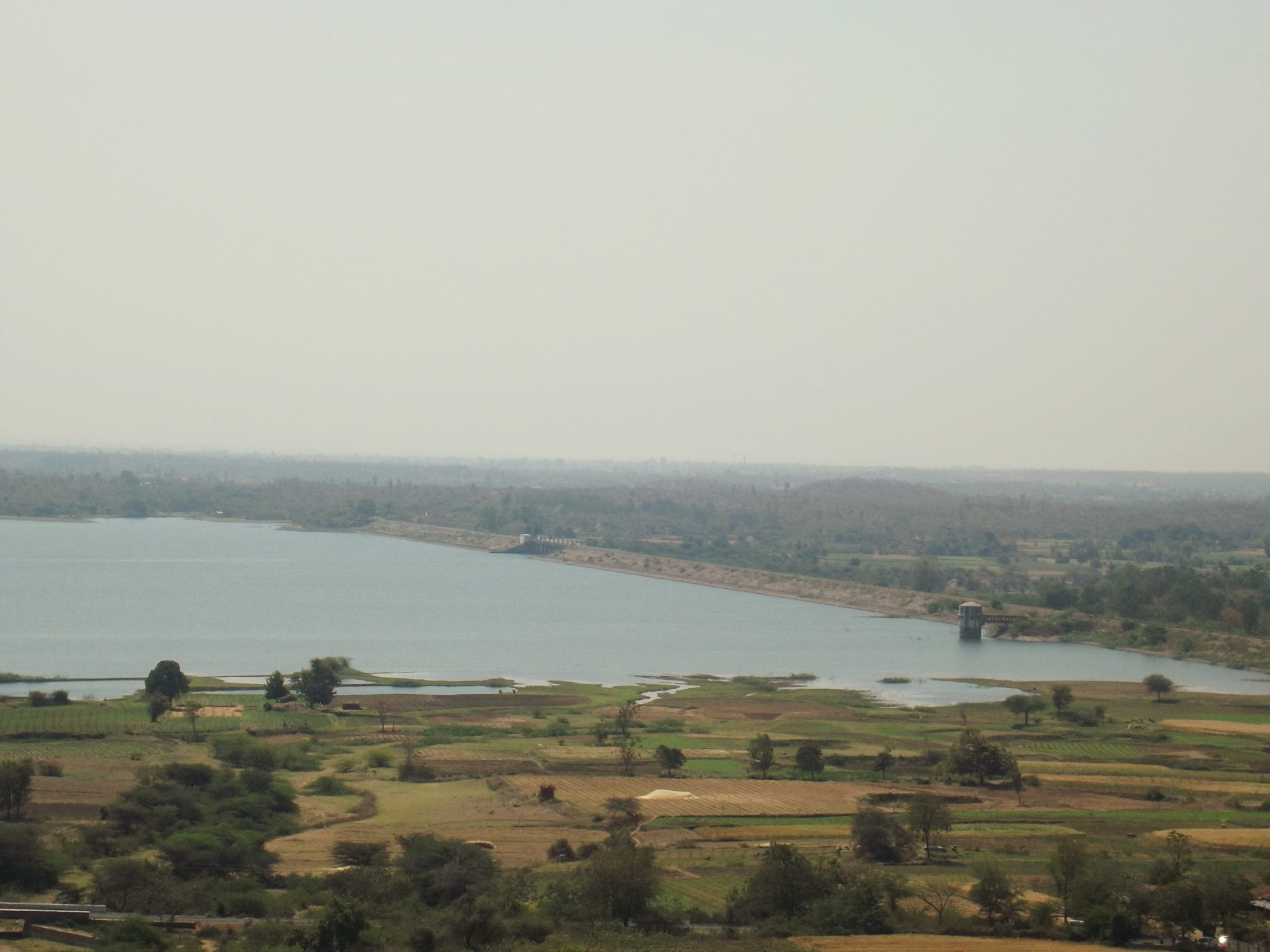

- Location within Gujarat
- Interactive map of Mazum Dam
- Official name: Mazam Dam
- Coordinates: 23.487701°N 73.3515453°E
- Purpose: Flood Control, Irrigation
- Construction began: 1979
- Opening date: 1984

Dam and spillways
- Type of dam: Earthen
- Impounds: Mazum River
- Length: 2402 m

Reservoir
- Creates: Mazam Reservoir
- Total capacity: 1916 TMC

The Mazum Dam (alternatively Mazam) is built on the small river Mazum in the Aravalli District about 9 km from Modasa, Gujarat, India. The dam supplies water, allowing farmers to harvest their crops, and is also used when nearby towns are running out of water.
