= Anil Joshiyara =

Indian politician (1952–2022)

Dr. Anilbhai Joshiyara

Member of Gujarat Legislative Assembly
- In office 2 May 1995 – 14 March 2022
- Constituency: Bhiloda

Personal details
- Born: 24 April 1952 Gujarat, India
- Died: 14 March 2022 (aged 69) Chennai, Tamil Nadu, India
- Party: Indian National Congress
- Other political affiliations: Bharatiya Janata Party (1995–1996); Rashtriya Janata Party (1996–1998) Indian National Congress (―2022)
- Occupation: Doctor, Politician

Anil Joshiyara (24 April 1952 – 14 March 2022) was an Indian politician and surgeon from Gujarat.

== Biography ==
He was elected to the Gujarat Legislative Assembly from Bhiloda in the 1995 Gujarat Legislative Assembly election as a member of Bharatiya Janata Party. He was sworn as Cabinet Minister for Health & Family Welfare of Gujarat in 1996.

He served as the Member of Legislative Assembly from Bhiloda constituency in the Aravalli district, Gujarat for its 14th Legislative assembly representing Indian National Congress.

Joshiyara died from post-COVID-19 complications in Chennai on 14 March 2022, at the age of 69.

== Political highlights ==
1995–1997	MLA, Bhiloda (ST) constituency
2002–2007	MLA, Bhiloda (ST) constituency
2007–2012	MLA, Bhiloda (ST) constituency
2012–2017	MLA, Bhiloda (ST) constituency
2017–2022	MLA, Bhiloda (ST) constituency
