= Bayad, Gujarat =

Bayad બાયડ
- Location in Gujarat
- Coordinates: 23.220°N 73.216°E
- Country: India
- State: Gujarat
- District: Aravalli district

Population (2011)
  - Total: 17,886

Languages
  - Official: Gujarati
- Time zone: UTC+5:30 (IST)
- Postal Index Number: 383325

Bayad is a city in Aravalli district of Gujarat, India. It is the headquarters of a taluka of the same name. Prior to the formation of Aravalli district in 2013, Bayad was a part of Sabarkantha district.

== See also ==
- Aravalli district
