= Amodara =

Village in Gujarat

Amodara is large village of Bayad taluka in Aravalli district. Amodara's population is around or more than 10000 people. In Amodara village, the predominant population is of the Solanki Rajputs who came here from Kalari and some other villages/towns. Most of the population of the village are farmers. This village has basic facilities like a Primary School, Higher Secondary School, Gram Panchayat, dairy and also 4G internet services.

== Places ==
Most Visited Places

- Gopnath Mahadev
- Khodiyar Temple
- Bahuchar Temple (Amodara)

== Places ==
Gopnath Mahadev is a Shiva Temple. This Temple is more than 1000 years old. In the auspicious Shravan month, there is much crowding at this temple to offer prayers.

Ma Khodiyar Temple, dedicated to the goddess Shakti, is located in Juna Shedha. Many devotees come here during Khodiyar Jayanti and Khodiyar Maa's Rath journey which travels all around Amodara.
