= Akrund =

- Village
- Location in Gujarat, India Akrund (India)
- Country: India
- State: Gujarat
- District: Aravalli

Government
  - Type: Indian

Languages
  - Official: Gujarati, Hindi
- Time zone: UTC+5:30 (IST)
- Vehicle registration: GJ-9
- Website: gujaratindia.com

Akrund is a small village in Dhansura Taluka of Aravalli district of northern Gujarat in western India.
