= Bhiloda Assembly constituency =

Legislative Assembly constituency in Gujarat State, India

Coordinates: 23.77°N 73.25°E

Bhiloda
- Constituency No. 30 for the Gujarat Legislative Assembly

Constituency details
- Country: India
- Region: Western India
- State: Gujarat
- District: Aravalli
- Lok Sabha constituency: Sabarkantha
- Established: 1972
- Total electors: 316,274
- Reservation: ST

Member of Legislative Assembly
- 15th Gujarat Legislative Assembly
- Incumbent P. C. Baranda
- Party: Bharatiya Janata Party
- Elected year: 2022

Bhiloda is one of the 182 Legislative Assembly constituencies of Gujarat state in India.

It is part of Aravalli district and is reserved for candidates belonging to the Scheduled Tribes. This constituency is one of seven that together make up the Sabarkantha constituency of the Lok Sabha. Due to Tribal native called Bhil this Nagar has been named as Bhiloda as per revenue records available.

== Segments ==
This assembly seat represents the following segments

1. Meghraj Taluka
2. Bhiloda Taluka (Part) Villages - agheshvari, Virpur, Chorimala, Raisingpur, Kundol (Pal), Bavaliya (Pal), Dhansor, Jhejhudi, Torda, Jayala, Andhariya, Kalyanpur, Bavaliya (Takapur), Indrapura, Kishangadh, Bedasan, Malasa, Malekpur, Ubsal, Bolundra, Vajapur, Siladri, Bhanmer, Rampuri, Ambabar, Pahada, Takatuka, Math Bolundra, Vansli, Vejpur, Ghanti, Jumsar (Chhapra), Jumsar, Munai, Khalvad, Lilchha, Bhiloda, Mankroda, Dholvani, Silasan, Budheli, Dharasan, Patiyakuva, Vasaya, Jambudi, Panch Mahudi, Ode, Bornala, Budharasan, Ajitpura, Abhapur, Meru (Bhetali), Bhutavad, Naranpur, Mau (Navalpur), Sunsar, Desan, Narsoli, Khumapur, Vankaner, Rintoda, Nava Bhetali, Jasvantpura, Hathiya, Dodisara Nana, Dodisara Mota, Chitariya, Sonasan, Kadvath, Ansol, Pahadiya, Odha Pada, Rangpur, Nava Venpur, Dhandhasan, Raypur, Jesingpur, Bhetali, Vasai, Bhatera, Chiboda, Thuravas, Akodiya, Lokhan, Rampur, kheroj, Kaleka, Mandhari, Nandoj, Karanpur, Hardaspur, Dhamboliya, Palla, Dhuleta (Palla), Venpur, Vaktapur, Karchha, Mota Samera, Dahgamda, Ravtavada, Mota Kanthariya, Ramera, Lusadiya, Nana Kanthariya, Nana Samera, Padardi, Shamalaji, Rudardi, Meravada, Gadhiya, Rudral, Kheradi, Vanzar, Chibhadiyata, Janali, Moti Bebar, Napda (Khalsa), Vajapur (Kherancha), Khari, Shamalpur, Bahecharpura, Dolatpur, Rampur (Moti), Sabran, Sarkilimdi, Lakshmanpura, Gali Semro, Vanka Timba, Kagda Mahuda, Vaghpur, Devni Mori, Bhavanpur, Kherancha, Sodpur, Napda (Jagiri), Khiloda, Shobhayada (Jagiri), Vansera, Gadadar, Asal, Khodamba, Kuski, Himatpur, Kundol (Dahgamda), Godh (Kuski), Adhera, Lalpur, Brahmpuri, Vandiyol, Sunokh, Vagodar, Chhapara Kuski, Jaliya

== Members of the Legislative Assembly ==
| Year | Member | Picture | Party |
|---|---|---|---|
| 1985 | Upendra Trivedi | | Indian National Congress |
| 1990 | Upendra Trivedi | | Indian National Congress |
| 1995 | Anil Joshiyara | | Bharatiya Janata Party |
| 1998 | Upendra Trivedi | | Independent politician |
| 2002 | Anil Joshiyara | | Indian National Congress |
| 2007 | Anil Joshiyara | | Indian National Congress |
| 2012 | Anil Joshiyara | | Indian National Congress |
| 2017 | Anil Joshiyara | | Indian National Congress |
| 2022 | P. C. Baranda | | Bharatiya Janata Party |

== Election results ==
=== 2022 ===
Gujarat Assembly Election, 2022
| Party | Candidate | Votes | % | ±% |
|---|---|---|---|---|
| BJP | P. C. Baranda | 90,396 | 43.62 | |
| INC | Rajendrakumar Parghi | 42,831 | 20.67 | |
| AAP | Rupsibhai Bhagora | 61,628 | 29.74 | New |
| Majority | | | 13.88 | |
| Turnout | | 207,223 | | |
| BJP gain from INC | | Swing | | |

=== 2017 ===
Gujarat Assembly Election, 2017: Bhiloda
| Party | Candidate | Votes | % | ±% |
|---|---|---|---|---|
| INC | Anil Joshiyara | 95,719 | 49.26 | −5.22 |
| BJP | P. C. Baranda | 83,302 | 42.87 | +6.33 |
| Majority | | 12,417 | 6.39 | −11.55 |
| Turnout | | 194,311 | 69.26 | −4.19 |
| Registered electors | | 280,546 | | |
| INC hold | | Swing | | |

=== 2012 ===
Gujarat Assembly Election, 2012
| Party | Candidate | Votes | % | ±% |
|---|---|---|---|---|
| INC | Anil Joshiyara | 95,799 | 54.48 | |
| BJP | Nilaben Modiya | 64,256 | 36.54 | |
| Majority | | 31,543 | 17.94 | |
| Turnout | | 175,848 | 73.45 | |
| INC hold | | Swing | | |

== See also ==
- List of constituencies of the Gujarat Legislative Assembly
- Aravalli district
