= Dhansura =

- Town
- Location in Gujarat, India Dhansura (India)
- Coordinates: 23°20′57″N 73°12′43″E
- Country: India
- State: Gujarat
- District: Aravalli district

Government
  - Body: Dhansura Gram Panchayat

Population (2011)
  - Total: 12,424
  - Density: 328/km^{2} (850/sq mi)

Languages
  - Official: Gujarati, Hindi
- Time zone: UTC+5:30 (IST)
- PIN: 383310
- Telephone code: 2774
- Vehicle registration: GJ - 31
- Nearest city: Modasa
- Sex ratio: 926 ♂/♀
- Literacy: 80.98%%
- Lok Sabha constituency: Aravalli
- Vidhan Sabha constituency: Modasa
- Civic agency: Dhansura Gram Panchayat
- Website: gujaratindia.com

Dhansura is a small town in the Aravalli district of Gujarat, India. The town is located about 85 km northeast of Ahmedabad. Previously it was a part of Sabarkantha district and now it is part of Aravalli district.

Dhansura is 16 km from Modasa on the Gujarat state highway 59 and is connected with Modasa by state transport services. It is an important trading center with market yard, two oil-mills and five ginning and pressing factories. It is famous for its jaw crusher manufacturing industries, plastic stretch film manufacture, vibrating screen manufacture. There is a Panchayat ghar. There are hostels for students of Khadayata Banias, Kutchi Patels and Chaudhari Patels. There is a separate hostel for girls.

== History ==
Around in 1982, B. J. Makwana of the Department of Archaeology of the Government of Gujarat and Suman H. Pandya of the DPCBL Mahila Arts and Commerce College, Dhansura undertook excavation at the mound known as Gormati-ni-Khan situated to the north of the village. During excavation, two human skeletons probably belonging to Mesolithic period were unearthed from a depth of 105 cms which were oriented north-east to south-west. One of these was of an adult while the other was that of a child. Broken teeth of large animals, back-bones and other burnt bones, microlithic tools e.g., blade, lunates, point, flake, scraper made from chert, carnelian and chalcedony were also found. In one of the trenches human skeleton was found. In the same trench, below the skeleton a saddle quern found in association with charred bones of Bos indicus, hammerstones and microliths, etc.
