= Mahendra Patel (politician) =

Indian politician

Dr Patel Mahendrabhai Somabhaiis is an Indian politician from Gujarat. He is a member of the BJP. In 1998, he was elected from Aravalli district's Bayad Assembly constituency of Gujarat.
