= List of cities in Gujarat by population =

The following is a list of the largest (in area) and most populous cities in Gujarat, India as per the 2021 census. There are 31 cities in Gujarat with a population over 100,000.

== Map ==
All urban agglomerations in Gujarat with populations > 100,000
Population over 1 million – Metropolis Population < 1 million

== List ==
This is a list of cities and towns in Gujarat, India.

	City	District	Area	Ward	Population (2021)
01.	Ahmedabad	Ahmedabad	530.00	48	8,253,000
02.	Surat	Surat	461.60	30	7,490,000
03.	Vadodara	Vadodara	220.33	19	2,233,000
04.	Rajkot	Rajkot	170.00	18	1,934,000
05.	Bhavnagar	Bhavnagar	108.27	13	771,000
06.	Jamnagar	Jamnagar	125.67	16	623,000
07.	Junagadh	Junagadh	160.00	20	415,000
08.	Gandhinagar	Gandhinagar	326.00	13	410,000
09.	Anand	Anand	47.89	13	374,000
10.	Navsari	Navsari	43.71	13	367,000
11.	Surendranagar	Surendranagar	58.60	13	329,000
12.	Morbi	Morbi	46.58	13	327,000
13.	Gandhidham	Kutch	63.49	13	322,000
14.	Nadiad	Kheda	78.55	13	292,000
15.	Bharuch	Bharuch	43.80	11	290,000
16.	Patan	Patan	43.89	11	283,000
17.	Porbandar	Porbandar	38.43	13	282,000
18.	Mehsana	Mehsana	31.08	13	247,000
19.	Bhuj	Kutch	56.00	11	244,000
20.	Veraval	Gir Somnath	39.95	11	241,000
21.	Vapi	Valsad	22.44	13	223,000
22.	Valsad	Valsad	24.10	11	221,000
23.	Godhra	Panchmahal	20.16	11	211,000
24.	Palanpur	Banaskantha	46.00	11	182,000
25.	Himmatnagar	Sabarkantha	21.01	11	181,000
26.	Kalol	Gandhinagar	25.42	11	174,000
27.	Botad	Botad	10.36	11	169,000
28.	Amreli	Amreli	65.00	11	153,000
29.	Gondal	Rajkot	74.48	11	145,000
30.	Jetpur	Rajkot	23.27	11	153,000

== Historical populations ==
Population of main cities of Gujarat 1901–2011:

Census year	Ahmedabad	Surat	Vadodara	Rajkot	Bhavnagar	Jamnagar	Junagadh	Gandhinagar (NA+ OG)
1901	185,889	119,306	103,790	36,151	56,442	53,844	–	–
1911	216,777	114,868	99,345	34,194	60,694	44,887	–	–
1921	274,007	117,434	94,712	45,645	59,392	42,495	–	–
1931	310,000	98,936	112,880	59,112	75,594	55,056	–	–
1941	591,267	171,443	153,301	66,353	102,851	71,588	–	–
1951	837,163	223,182	211,407	132,069	137,951	104,419	–	–
1961	1,149,918	288,026	298,398	194,145	176,473	148,572	–	–
1971	1,591,832	471,656	467,487	300,612	225,974	214,816	–	–
1981	2,159,127	776,583	734,473	445,076	308,642	294,344	–	–
1991	2,876,710	1,498,817	1,031,346	612,458	405,225	350,544	–	–
2001	3,520,085	2,433,835	1,306,227	967,476	511,085	443,518	266,038	–
After extension of city limit in 2006	–	2,876,374	–	–	–	–	–	–
2011	5,577,940	4,466,826	1,752,371	1,323,363	605,882	600,943	319,462	292,797
2021	8,253,000	6,936,534	2,240,522	1,934,000	712,000	711,000	407,000	410,323

== Divisions of Gujarat ==
The state of Gujarat is divided into four divisions namely North Gujarat, Central Gujarat, South Gujarat and Saurashtra-Kutch.In which the headquarters of North Gujarat is Mehsana, the headquarters of Central Gujarat is Ahmedabad, the headquarters of South Gujarat is Surat and the headquarters of Saurashtra-Kutch is Rajkot.

== See also ==
- List of metropolitan areas in Gujarat
- List of most populous metropolitan areas in India
- List of states and union territories of India by population
- Demographics of India
