= Climate Hawks Vote =

US climate grassroots advocacy group

- Abbreviation: CHV
- Formation: August 22, 2013
- Founders: RL Miller, Hunter Cutting, Brad Johnson
- Type: Super PAC
- Purpose: electoral politics
- Headquarters: California
- Region served: United States
- Chair: RL Miller
- Website: ClimateHawksVote.com

Climate Hawks Vote is a grassroots advocacy group that supports candidates and elected officials whom it identifies as making action on climate change a top priority. Founded in 2013, it consists of a Super PAC and a social welfare organization.

== History ==
"Climate hawk" is a term often used to describe people who work for aggressive steps regarding climate change and clean energy. The group seeks out those politicians who support pricing carbon, ending the use of coal, and deploying renewable energy, particularly solar and wind energy.

Co-founder and chair RL Miller is an activist, blogger, and chair of the California Democratic Party's environmental caucus. The other founders are Hunter Cutting, Director of Strategic Communications at Climate Nexus, and journalist and climate activist Brad Johnson.

The group was founded out of Miller's frustration that parts of the Democratic Party support fossil fuel. Miller states that within the party, "You don't speak out for restricting a woman's right to choose. You don't speak out for the Koch brothers. Yet at the same time, we've got plenty of people within the Democratic Party who think it is perfectly okay to speak out in support of coal." Miller has cited Montana Governor Brian Schweitzer, "an open cheerleader for coal," as a motivating factor in the creation of the group.

== Electoral politics ==
The group works to support climate-oriented candidates in primary and general elections for the House and Senate by endorsing candidates, engaging and educating voters, and training younger people to run for office. The group's strategy includes speaking directly to voters through knocking on doors, phone-banking, and holding rallies. As a super-PAC, Climate Hawks Vote cannot donate to or coordinate with any candidate or campaign.

"We're seeking to elect leaders willing to take on the greatest challenge facing the next few generations of humanity. Too many Democratic politicians consider climate to be just another issue bubbling below the surface of top priorities, and too many Democrats are willing to excuse Democratic politicians who tout their states' coal and oil resources as long as they're good on other issues," Miller told The Hill.

Climate Hawks Vote does not rule out backing Republicans, but it focuses on ranking Democrats since they generally show more interest in climate change. The group is "not partisan, but the Republican Party is so deeply entrenched in denying the existence of climate change that if a Republican climate hawk were to emerge, we would look hard at a Republican's willingness to buck leadership as well as the Republican's position on climate," Miller said. Support would depend on not just acknowledging human-caused climate change but having a viable plan to do something about it.

In 2014, the group made endorsements in 17 races, and the endorsed candidates won in 11 of those despite it being a tough year for Democrats. Sen. Brian Schatz of Hawaii was among those endorsed. The group has been credited with perhaps making the difference in his primary election victory, which had a margin of 1,769 votes.

Among the races that Climate Hawks Vote didn't win was a long-shot bid to have Paul Clements unseat Fred Upton, chair of the House Committee on Energy and Commerce, after Clements did surprisingly well in one poll.

The group has called for presidential leadership on climate by restricting extraction of fossil fuels on public land, particularly coal from the Powder River Basin of Montana and Wyoming. Climate Hawks Vote endorsed Sen. Bernie Sanders in the Democratic presidential primary "after he won an overwhelming 92 percent of over 22,000 votes cast in the group's online survey."

== Scorecard ==
Climate Hawks Vote gives scores to most Democrats and Independents (and a few Republicans) in the House and Senate that measure their climate leadership. Rather than look at votes, the scores most heavily weigh public engagement, such as appearances at climate events, press conferences, and speeches. The group also looks at bills authored or cosponsored, press releases, websites, and congressional caucuses that the legislators have joined.

Rated on a scale of −100 to +100, the group considers each member of Congress to be a climate hawk, a "climate duck" (one who ducks the issue), or a "climate peacock" (those who are all show but no action). "I want to use [the scorecard] to identify the climate champions," said Miller. "I wanted to create a certain toughness that I think has been missing from environmental politics ... a hard-headed, in-it-to-win-it attitude when it comes to climate change."

Other groups produce similar environmental scores, but Climate Hawks Vote focuses only on climate. Scores from groups such as the League of Conservation Voters look at votes but not legislators' intensity of leadership or engagement with the public. Climate Hawks Vote tries to "look at leadership, not just votes," says Miller. "For example, [Sen.] Amy Klobuchar [D-Minn.] is a popular Democrat with a high LCV rating. I pulled her up randomly, and compared her with Sheldon Whitehouse [D-R.I.], who is our gold standard in the Senate. The last time she mentioned climate, at the time I did this [2013], was in 2008. A lightbulb went off in my head: We're trusting them to vote as a bloc but they're not leading on this issue. We need to measure public engagement."

Another difference between the scorecards from Climate Hawks Vote and other groups is that some others use questionnaire responses from candidates in making decisions, while Climate Hawks Vote looks only at public actions and statements. The group considers public statements to have greater accountability.

Sen. Bernie Sanders' announcement of his presidential candidacy coincided with the Climate Hawks Vote's release of its first Senate scorecard, in which Sanders was the highest-rated senator in the just-completed 113th Congress. This rating was based in part on his marching on climate with New Yorkers and his sponsorship of bills ranked as important to the group: the Climate Protection Act of 2013 to impose a carbon pollution fee and the Residential Energy Savings Act of 2013 that would have made loans to states to provide rebates for rooftop solar systems. Others high on the list were Schatz, Whitehouse, Ed Markey, and Barbara Boxer. Whitehouse topped the preliminary list for the 114th Congress.

On the other hand, Senate leader Chuck Schumer was given a fairly low score and criticized by the group for not connecting climate change with extreme events such as Hurricane Sandy. Elizabeth Warren scored a bit higher but was criticized for not making climate a central issue except for opposing the Keystone XL Pipeline, leaving her 23rd of the 48 Democrats scored in the 113th Congress. She has shown signs of moving up in the 114th Congress.

At the bottom of the Democrats were Mark Warner, Jon Tester, Joe Donnelly, Heidi Heitkamp, Joe Manchin, and Claire McCaskill. Bob Casey, Jr., did better than those but tied with one of the few Republicans scored, Chuck Grassley. Seven Democratic seats were not scored in the 113th congress: Mark Udall, Mary Landrieu, Carl Levin, Kay Hagan, Tim Johnson, Jay Rockefeller, and the seat shared by Max Baucus and John Walsh.

== Advisory board ==
Climate Hawks Vote's advisory board has included:

- Darcy Burner, CEO of TerraHeating, activist, and past congressional candidate
- Van Jones, activist, formerly White House aide and co-host of CNN's Crossfire
- Bill McKibben, founder of 350.org
- Phil Radford, President, Progressive Power Lab
- James Rucker, co-founder of Color of Change
- Jigar Shah, CEO of Carbon War Room
