= Jigar Shah =

American businessman (born 1974)

- Born: Jigar Hasmukh Shah; August 30, 1974 (age 52); Modasa, India
- Citizenship: USA
- Education: University of Illinois (BS); University of Maryland (MBA)
- Occupation: Clean energy entrepreneur
- Known for: Director, Loan Programs Office of the US Department of Energy, Founder, SunEdison; CEO, Carbon War Room; President, Generate Capital
- Spouse: Khushali Shah
- Children: Dhilan Shah

Jigar Shah (born August 30, 1974 in Modasa, India) is an American entrepreneur and clean energy advocate. He served as director of the Loan Programs Office (LPO) at the U.S. Department of Energy from March 2021 to January 2025, during which time the LPO's lending authority for commercializing emerging clean energy technologies expanded from approximately $40 billion to $400 billion.

Prior to joining the Department of Energy, Shah worked as a clean energy entrepreneur, author, and podcast host. He is known for advocating market-driven solutions to climate change, and is the author of Creating Climate Wealth: Unlocking the Impact Economy (2013) in which he argues that addressing climate change can generate strong financial returns when entrepreneurs, corporations, investors, and governments collaborate at scale.

== Early life and education ==
Shah was born in India and emigrated to the United States with his family at age one. At age eight, his family settled in Sterling, Illinois, where he attended public schools through to graduate level. He holds a BS in Mechanical Engineering from the University of Illinois Urbana-Champaign and an MBA from the University of Maryland.

== Career ==
After working in strategy at BP Solar and as a contractor for the United States Department of Energy on alternative vehicles and fuel cell programs, Shah founded the company SunEdison in 2003, pioneering a "no money down solar" model that unlocked a multi-billion-dollar solar market and built a large solar services company. The company deployed solar energy through the power purchase agreement (PPA) business model, enabling organizations to purchase solar energy under long-term, predictably priced contracts without bearing the capital costs of ownership or operation. Shah sold SunEdison in 2008.

Shah is the co-founder and President of Generate Capital, and co-founded the Carbon War Room with Richard Branson and Virgin Unite, serving as its CEO from 2009 to 2012. The Carbon War Room was dedicated to harnessing entrepreneurship to deploy clean energy solutions at scale.

In 2013 Shah wrote Creating Climate Wealth: Unlocking the Impact Economy. The book argues that business model innovation rather than new technology is the primary driver for attracting mainstream capital and achieving transformational change. Shah envisioned meeting the 2020 climate goals by creating the equivalent of 100,000 companies worldwide, each generating $100 million in revenue. He contends that while new technology has value, deployment of existing technologies is the more critical path to near-term climate targets.

Shah has advocated ending all energy subsidies, including those for renewable energy, to establish a level playing field across energy sources. Federal Election Commission records show he has made repeated donations to the Climate Hawks Vote Political Action Committee since 2016.

== Podcasting ==
Shah was a founding co-host of The Energy Gang, a podcast dedicated to exploring the technological, political, and market forces shaping energy and environmental policy. In a 2017 episode he introduced what co-host Stephen Lacey dubbed the "Jigar Shah Rule", namely that countries should not adopt poorly designed energy policy. He argued that competitive mechanisms such as volumetric reductions and feed-in tariffs, as originally structured, had become ineffective.

Shah co-hosts Open Circuit, a podcast produced by Latitude Media alongside Stephen Lacey and Caroline Golin. The show examines the technological, economic, and policy forces driving the energy transition, covering topics including AI-driven electricity demand, supply chain constraints, power market dynamics, and clean energy policy.

Shah also hosts Energy Empire, a podcast examining how abundant and affordable energy is reshaping the global economy. The show focuses on the people and large-scale deals driving the clean energy transition.

== Loan Programs Office ==
In March 2021, Energy Secretary Jennifer Granholm appointed Shah to direct the Loan Programs Office (LPO) of the United States Department of Energy. At the time of his appointment the office held approximately $40 billion in loan authority directed toward early-stage energy companies and emerging climate technologies.

Under Shah's leadership the LPO more than tripled its staff and reviewed over 100 applications from clean energy companies seeking loans totalling more than $100 billion. Following the passage of the Infrastructure Investment and Jobs Act and the Inflation Reduction Act by the U.S. Congress the office's loan authority expanded to $400 billion, directed toward commercializing emerging technologies, supporting clean energy job creation, and stimulating local economies. Among the conditional commitments announced during Shah's tenure was a loan to finance the development of a solar and long-duration energy storage microgrid on the tribal lands of the Viejas Band of Kumeyaay Indians near Alpine, California, as an attempt to support climate resilience planning for tribal communities.

In October 2023, Shah testified before the United States Senate Committee on Energy and Natural Resources amid ethical concerns about his ties to the companies in the trade association Shah co-founded, Cleantech Leaders Roundtable. Republican members of the committee brought forth concerns that the organization created a "pay-to-play" dynamic in which the company leaders paid for personal access to Shah and were therefore more likely to receive millions or billions of dollars in federal loans.
