= Bhiloda =

- city
- Location in Gujarat, India Bhiloda (India)
- Coordinates: 23.46°N 73.15°E
- Country: India
- State: Gujarat
- District: Aravalli District
- Taluka: Bhiloda Taluka

Population (2011)
  - Total: 16,074
  - Density: 286/km^{2} (740/sq mi)

Languages
  - Official: Gujarati, Hindi
- Time zone: UTC+5:30 (IST)
- PIN: 383245
- Telephone code: 91 02771
- ISO 3166 code: IN-GJ
- Vehicle registration: GJ-31
- Sex ratio: 941 ♂/♀
- Website: gujaratindia.com

Bhiloda is a taluka headquarters situated in Aravalli District in the state of Gujarat, India. It is situated on the banks of the Hathmati River among the Aravalli Hills.

== History ==
Bhiloda was a part of Idar State during British rule. After independence of India in 1947, Idar State was merged with Union of India. From 1947 to 1956, it was a part of Bombay state in the Idar district. From 1961 to 2013, Bhiloda was a part of Sabarkantha district which was bifurcated and Aravalli district was formed.

== Demographics ==
As of the 2011 census, Bhiloda had a population of 16,074.

== Places of interest ==
Jain Temples Chandaprabhu Digambar Jain Bavan Jinalya was built in 12th century and is dedicated to Chandraprabhu(eighth Tirthankara), measuring seventy feet long by forty-five broad and thirty high, built of sandstone covered with stucco. It has a tower of four stories, seventy- five feet high, and a rest-house within the entrance gate.

There is a Digamber Jain Temple known as Digamber Bavan Jinalay or Bhulavni which is also known for its memorial pillar, Kirti Stambh that is 58 feet tall. This temple has 111 Marble idols and 40 metal idols from 12th, 16th and 19th century. Standing posture Idols of Bharat and Bahubali are one of the main attraction of this temple.

Near by places of religious significance are Shamlaji, Bhavnath Temple, Mau and Vaidhnath temple.

== Amenities ==
Bhiloda has primary and secondary school, higher secondary college, agricultural market, police station, several banks (Dena Bank, Gramin, BOI, Canara Bank, Union Bank, IDBI Bank, BOB, SDB and State Bank of India), a cottage hospital, and a private hospitals.

Navibai Ramji Ashar Vidyalay is one of the oldest secondary and higher secondary school which is located very close to Bhiloda bus depot.
