= Hathmati River =

River in India

Hathmati
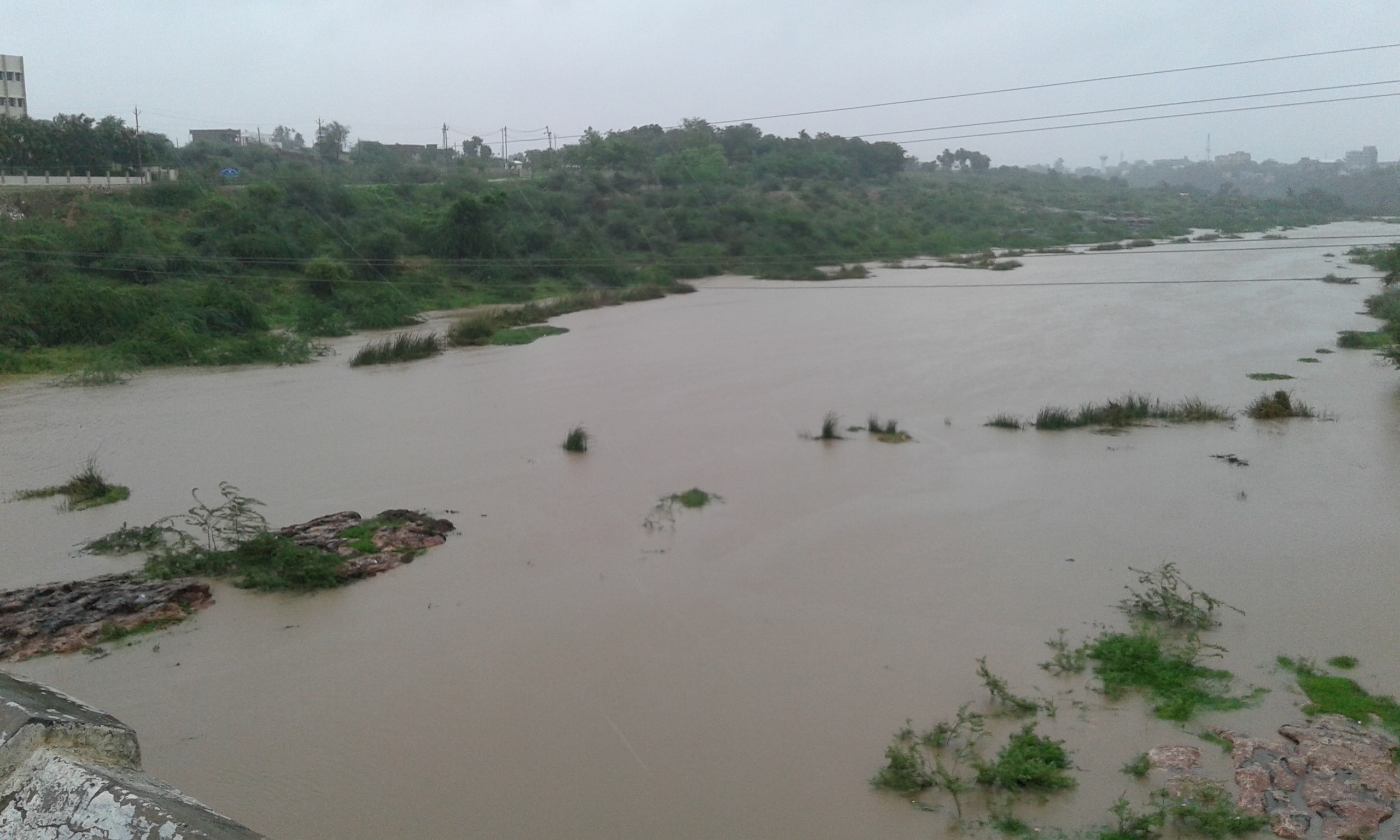

Location
- Country: India
- State: Gujarat

Physical characteristics
- Source: Aravalli Range
  - location: India
- Mouth
  - location: Sabarmati River, India
  - coordinates: 23°30′49″N 72°49′29″E
- Discharge
  - location: Sabarmati River

The Hathamati River is a river of western India, in Gujarat, whose origin is in the Aravali Range hills. It is one of the left-bank tributaries of the Sabarmati River. The Hathmati river system includes the Hathamati Dam near Himatnagar. The Guhai River is a tributary of the Hathmati River.

Bhiloda and Himatnagar are the main towns on the banks of this river.

In fiscal year 1899–1900, a channel was cut from the Hathmati Canal to the Khari River to capture rainy season overflow for irrigation from the Khari Cut.
