= Shamlaji =

Shamlaji Vishnu Mandir
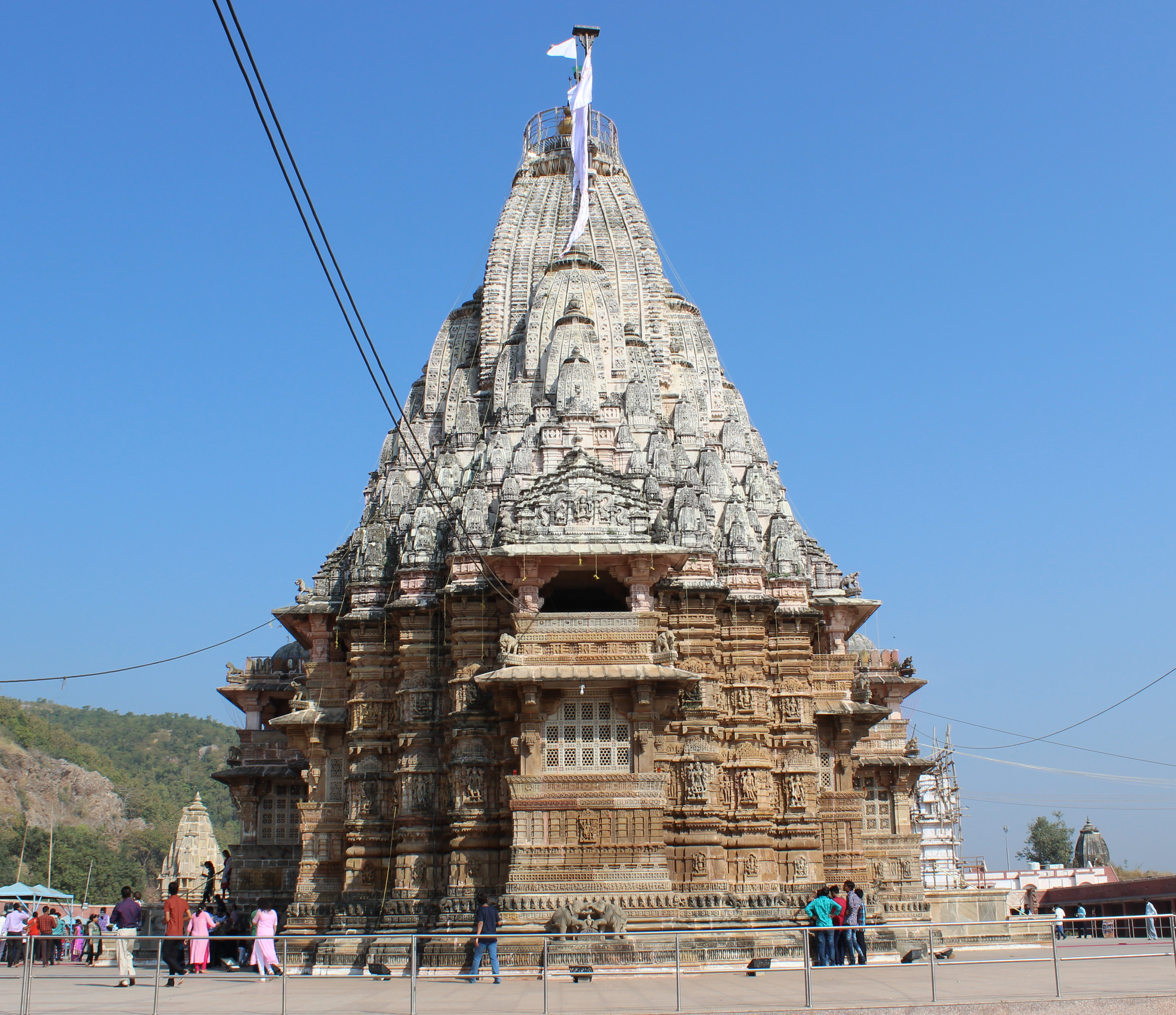
- The temple from behind

- Location in Gujarat

Religion
- Affiliation: Hinduism
- District: Aravalli district
- Deity: Vishnu as Gadadhar Shamlaji
- Festival: Annual fair on Kartik Poornima

Location
- Location: Shamlaji
- State: Gujarat
- Country: India
- Coordinates: 23°41′17″N 73°23′13″E

Architecture
- Completed: 11th century

Shamlaji, also spelled Shamalaji, is a major Hindu pilgrimage centre in Aravalli district of Gujarat state of India. The Shamlaji temple is dedicated to Vishnu. Several other Hindu temples are located nearby.

The present temple dedicated to Shamlaji, a form of Vishnu was perhaps started in the 11th century in Chaulukya style, but the present structure dates from the 15th-16th centuries. The sculpture of Vishnu in the sanctuary is probably seventh-8th century, and the small temple opposite houses a sixth-century sculpture of Shiva. The oldest intact temple is the small ninth-century Harishchandrani Chauri Temple, with a gateway nearby. Several ruins of temples, scattered idols and old brick-works surrounding the place establishes antiquity of the place.

A fourth-century Buddhist monastery and stupa at Devnimori is about two kilometres (1.2 mi) away, but is now under by the waters of the Meshvo Reservoir. This site dates to the Mauryan period, and a much older microlith site known as Dhek-Vadlo locally was found near Shamlaji.

Shamlaji was an important Hindu centre in the sixth century, probably the home of a sculpture workshop whose creations are found as far away as Mumbai, where the Parel Relief was found. Most of the ancient sculpture found at Shamlaji, in blueish schist, has now been removed to museums, especially to Mumbai and Vadodara.

== Shamlaji temple ==
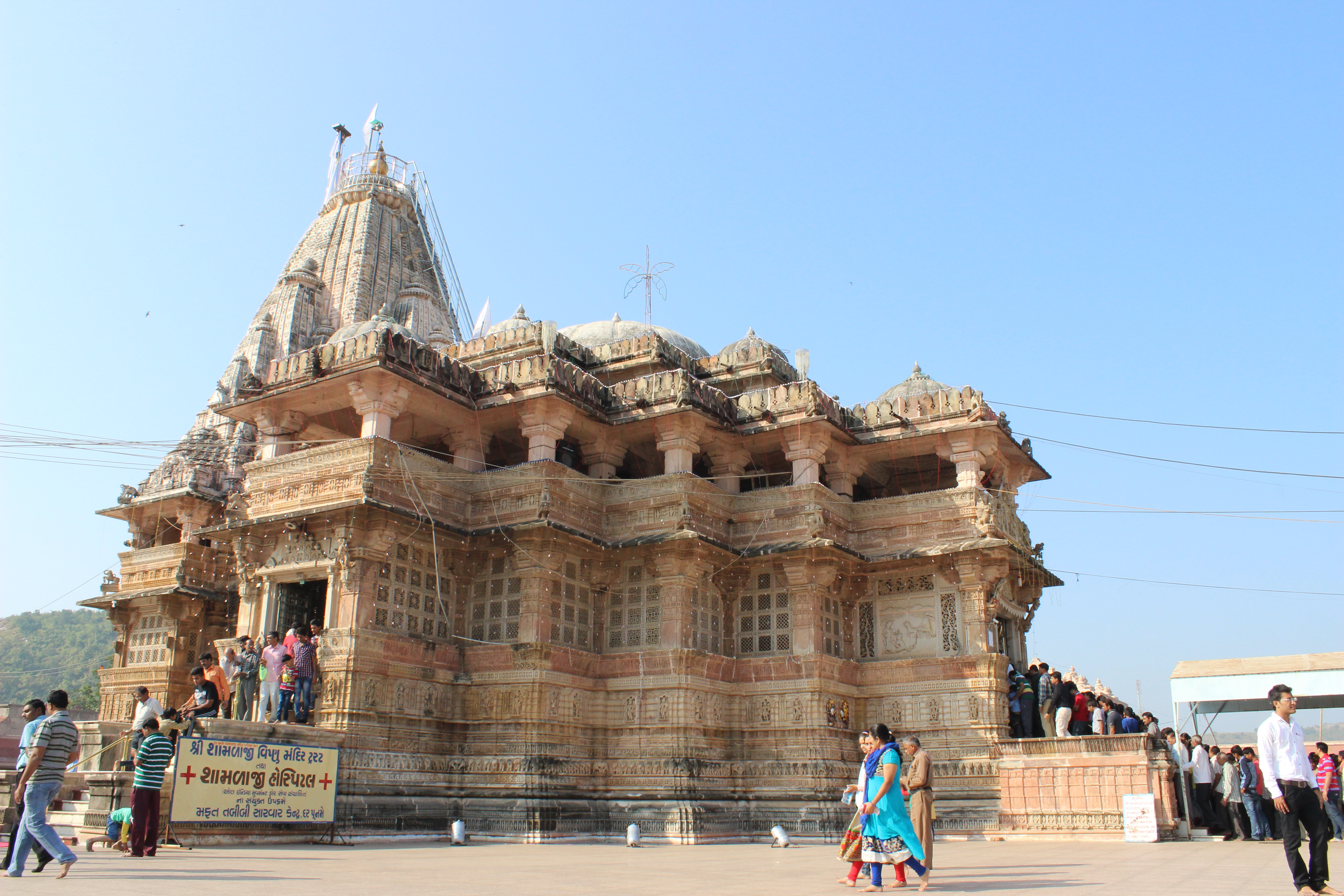
Shamlaji temple - side view

Shamlaji temple is located on the banks of the Meshvo river in the valley surrounded by well wooded hills. It is also referred to as Dholi Dhajawala due to white silk flag fluttering on top of the temple.

The temple of Śāmalājī aka Śāmḷājī houses an idol of Viṣṇu in Trivikrama form. Idols of the Trivikrama form of Viṣṇu hold a gadā (mace), cakra (discus), padma (lotus), and śaṁkha (conch) in each of the four arms. The mace is notably larger than normal, leading to the image's other name as Gadādhara Viṣṇu. Recently however, the temple and idol has been slightly Krishnaized, and a small golden flute was added to his right hand.

On the outer wall there are carvings of Viṣṇu, Lakṣmī-Nārāyaṇa, and various episodes from the Bhāgavata Purāṇa and Rāmāyaṇa.

There is an inscription on the base of a Garuḍa image dating to 1584, and the temple itself is dated to the 15th-16th centuries CE.

== Other places of interest ==
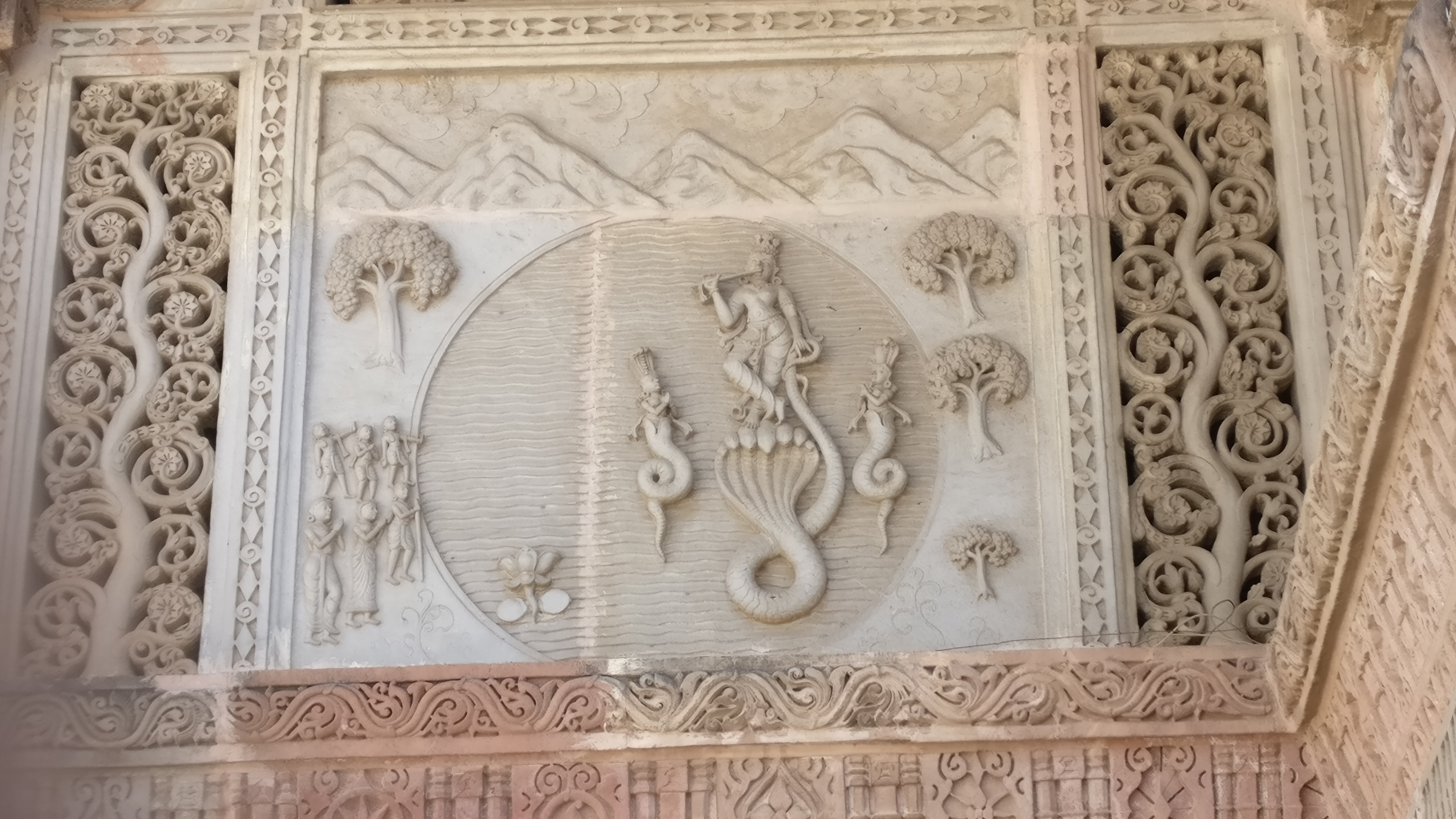
Relief of Krishna and jali screens on the main temple

Near the Shamlaji temple the river forms deep pools, much resorted to by persons bewitched or devil-possessed. To the north the waters of the Karmanu pond, and the Surya reservoir have the property of washing away sin.

Nearby Old Shamlaji temple is said to have been the original temple. The temple dedicated to Somnarayan, is, except the adytum, open on all sides, with a flat ceiling, surmounted by a pyramidal roof, supported on plain square stone pillars with carved capitals. Part of the shrine walls seem to have been formed of a series of upright stone slabs with sculptured figures in low relief. Many of these still remain. The most curious thing about the building is that, at the front and rear and both sides, in the centre of the facade the roof ends in a triangular pediment composed of boldly sculptured figures. Inside the building near the shrine, and, on the left hand as one faces it, is a remarkable human head in high relief standing out from the base of the span of an arch. The features are more human-looking than those generally seen in Hindu temples, and the arrangement of the hair is curious. There is a corresponding face on the other side but it is much worn or broken, while this is fresh and clear in its lines. In the shrine, part of the original altar or image seat still remains. It has been roughly heightened by bricks loosely piled on it, and on the raised superstructure stands a slab with a representation said to be of Somnarayan. This slab probably originally formed part of the outer wall of the shrine.

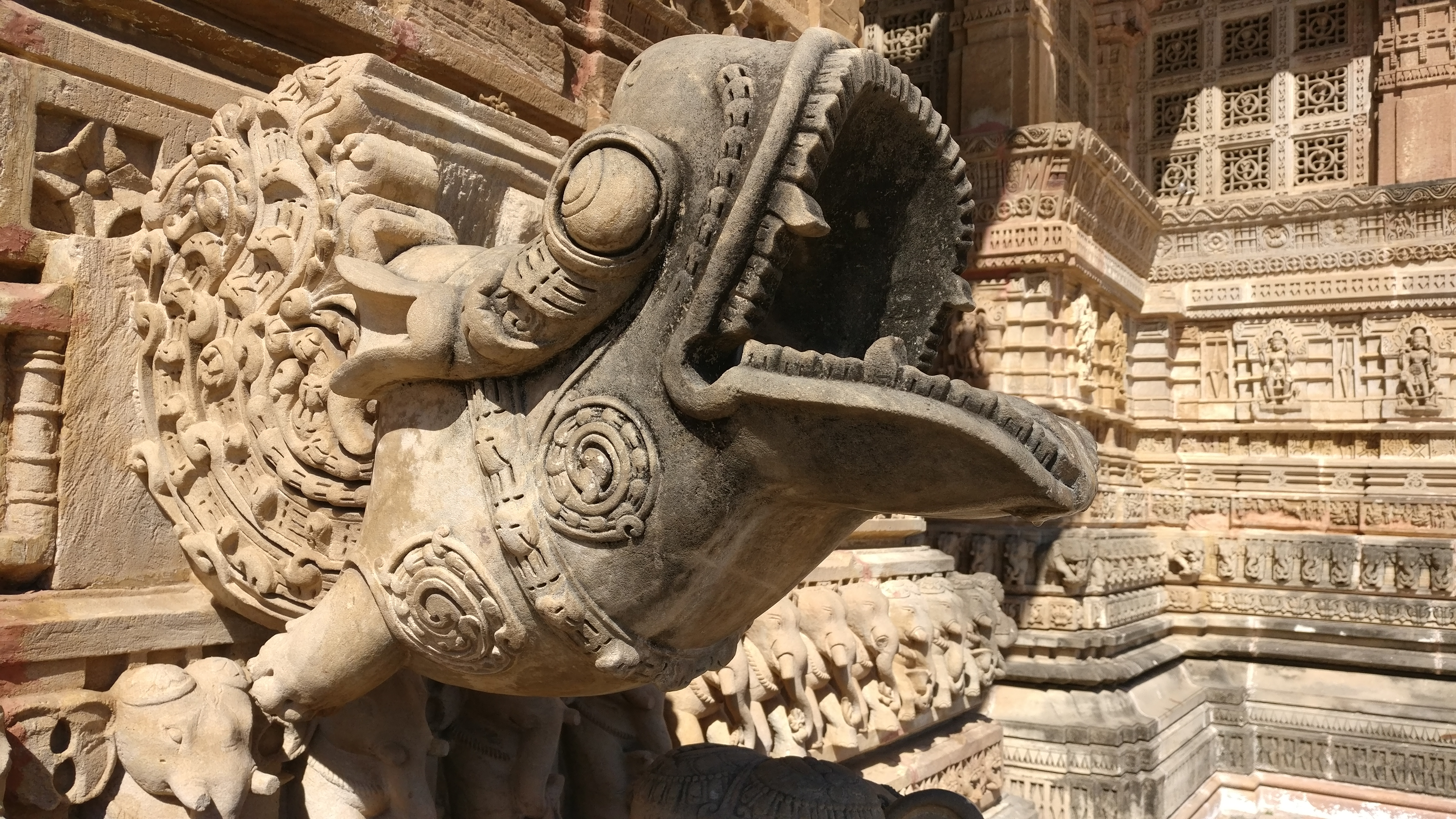
Pranala in the form of a makara

Kashi Vishwanath Mahadev temple, is seven feet below ground level and its pyramidal roof rise to the level of the land round it. It is entered through a gateway by a gradually deepening passage. Perhaps the temple was originally built in a hollow which has filled up. It looks old though not so old as Somnarayan' s the most ancient looking building in the place. In a small shrine between the Shamlaji temple and the river, late-Gupta period idol of standing Ganesha is worshiped. Trilokeshwar is a small temple opposite the Shamlaji temple dedicated to Shiva having idol with trident. On the opposite bank of the river, there is a temple dedicated to Ranchhodji, another form of Krishna.

The temple at Harishchandra ni Chori dates back to tenth century. The structure is enclosed within courtyard with lost walls except the ornamental gateway (Torana). There is a rectangular sanctum and a large pavilion in front of it.

Devni Mori, 2 km (1.2 mi) from Shamlaji, has remains of a Buddhist monastery dated to third-fourth century. The inscribed casket with body relics of Buddha was found from the Stupa excavated here.

The tomb of Navgaja Pir, a maulvi, is revered by many tribals.

Shyamalvan is a theme-based garden developed by Forest Department of Government of Gujarat. It was inaugurated by then Chief Minister of Gujarat, Narendra Modi, on 18 July 2009.

== Fair ==
A large annual fair is held on Kartik Sud 15th (October). The tribal community revers the Shamlaji as Kaliyo Dev or the Dark Divine. The large number of devotees visit the place and bathe in the river. Silver ornaments, metalwares, clothes and household items are sold during the fair.

== Connectivity ==
Shamlaji is around 20 km from Bhiloda and 29 km from Modasa. Located off National Highway 8, Shamlaji is frequented by state transport buses from Himmatnagar and Ahmedabad.

Train : Shamlaji Road railway station is nearest (14 km) railway station to Shamlaji. There are two daily passenger trains operated by the Indian railways on meter gauge track.

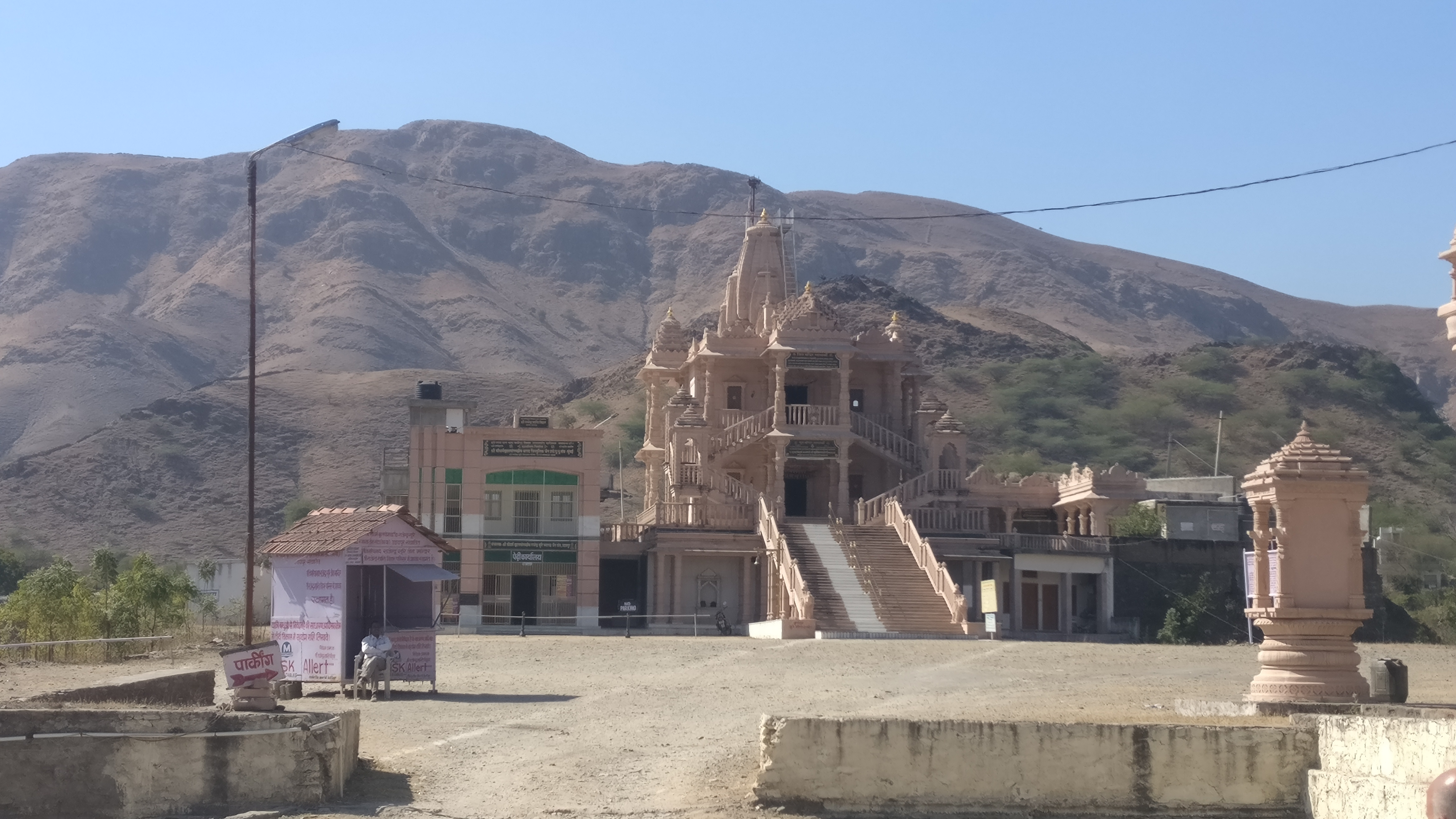
A temple from the front

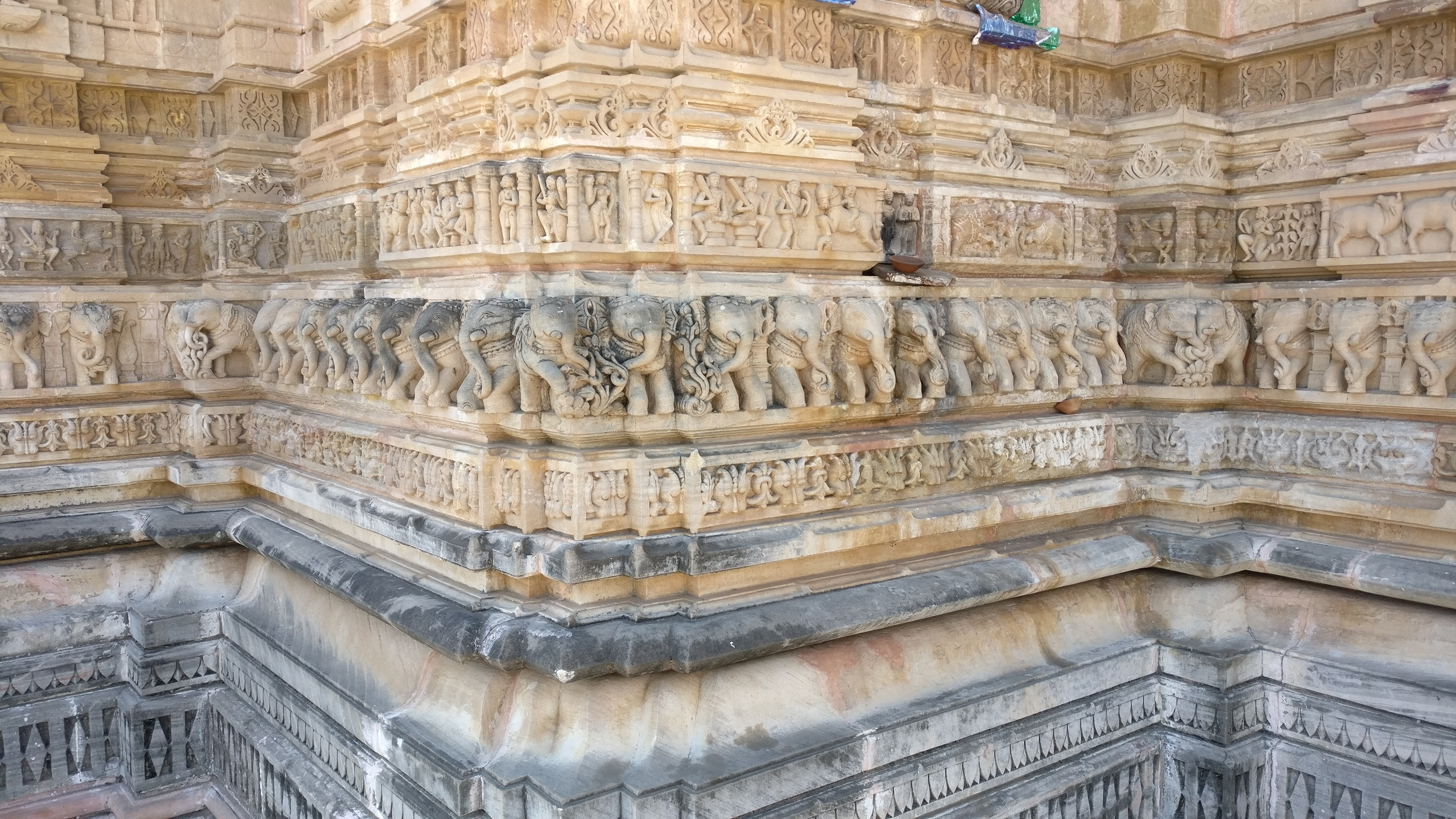
Carved plinth of the main temple

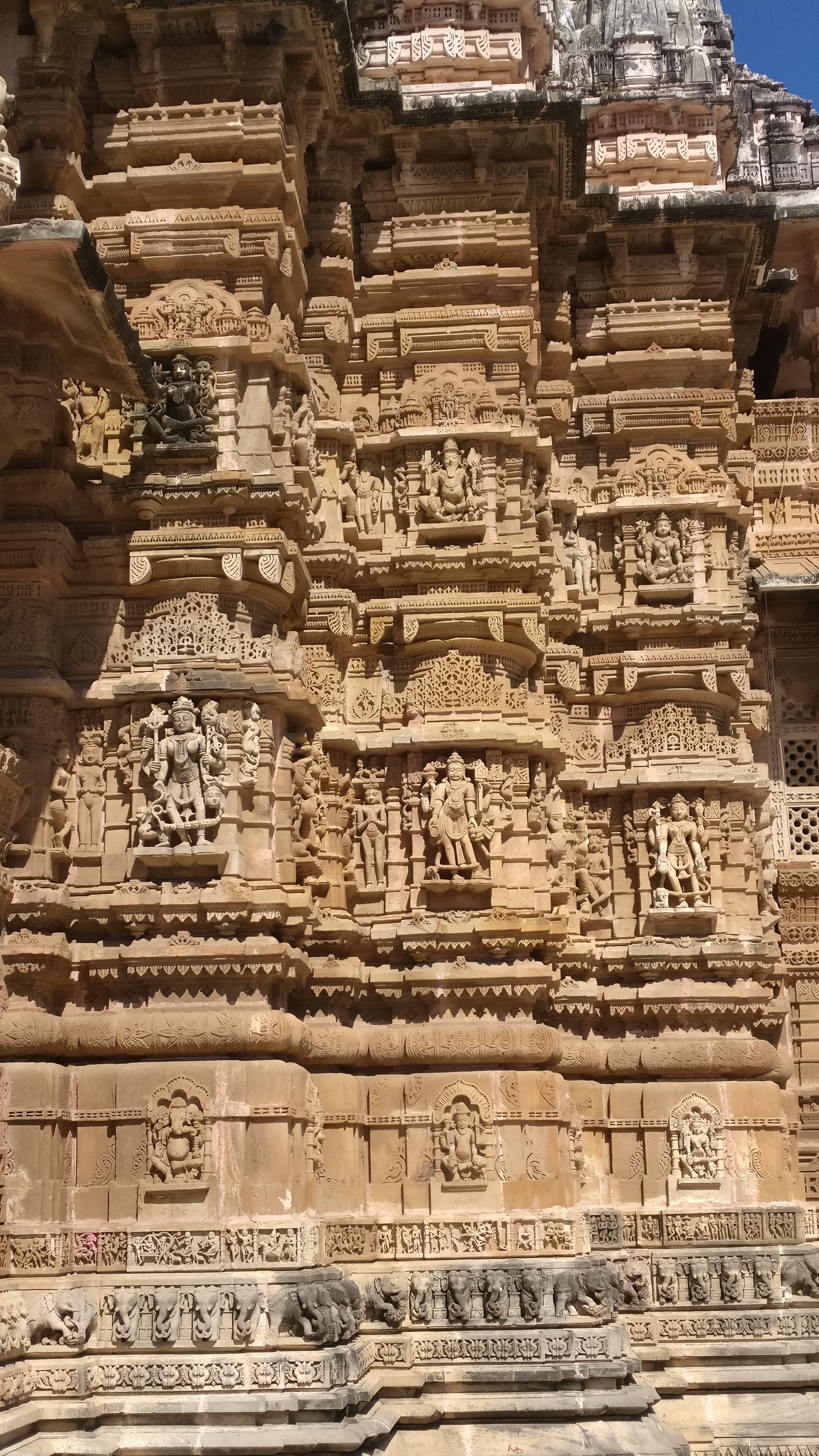
Main temple carvings

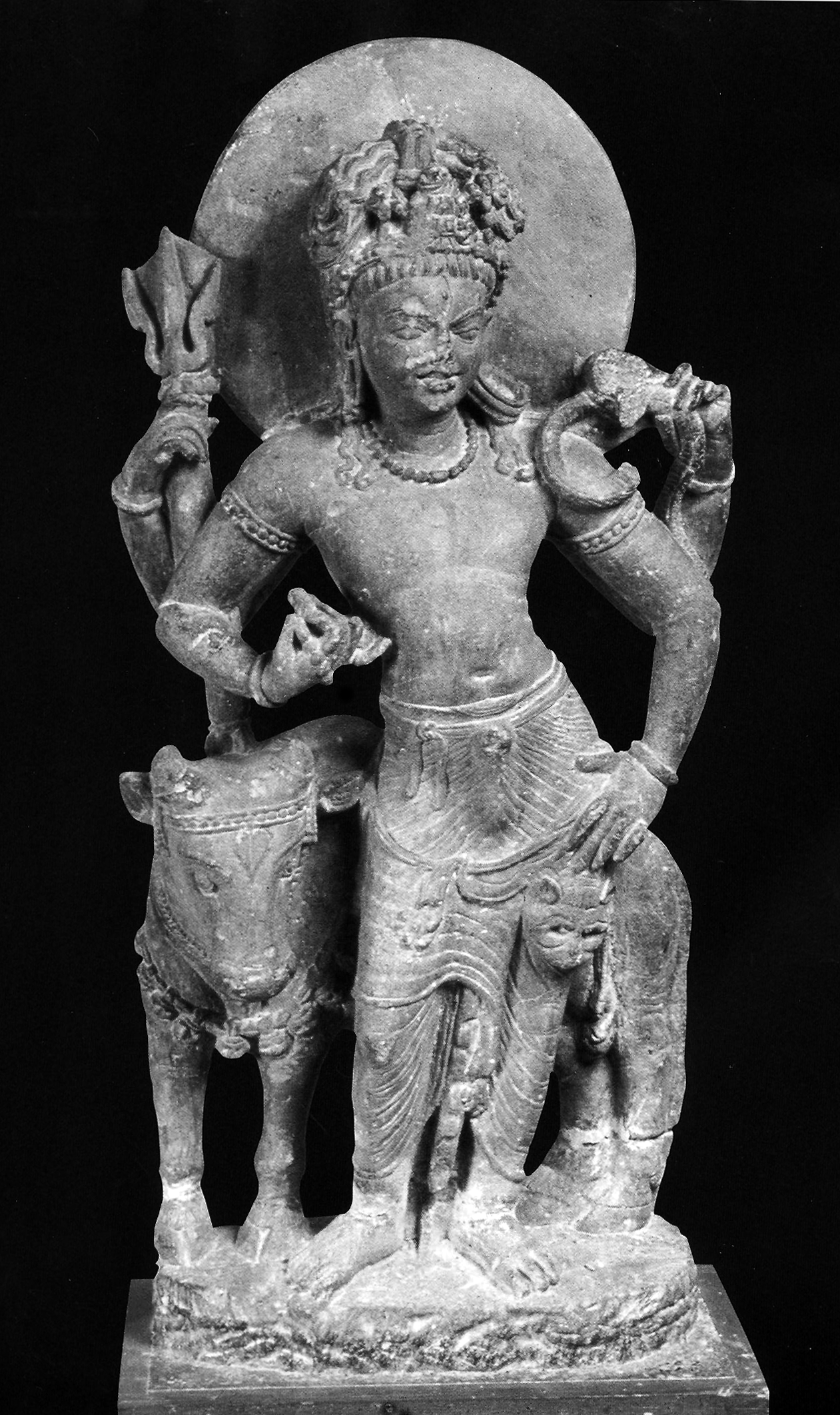
Sculpture of Shiva from Shamlaji.

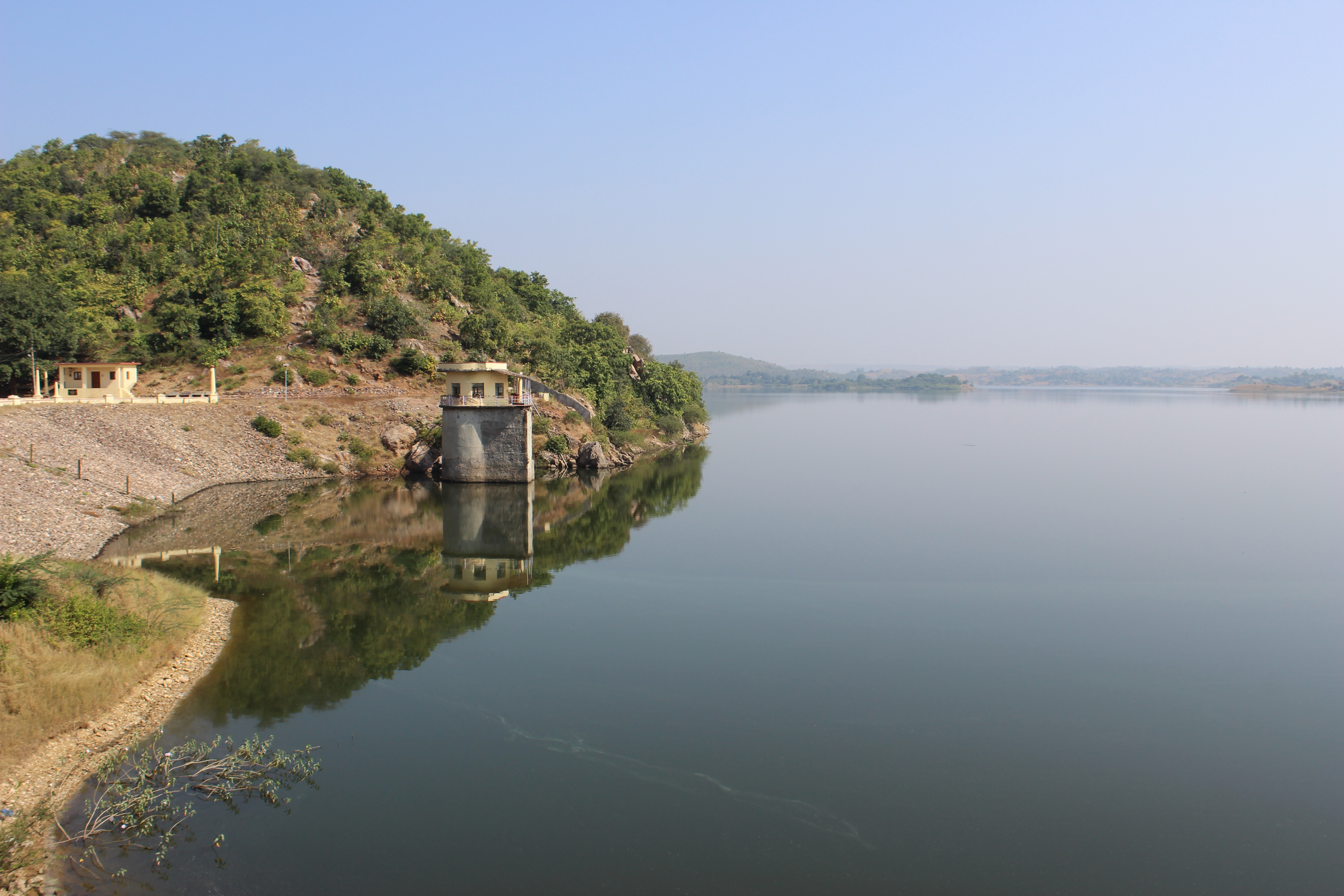
Meshvo Reservoir at Shamlaji
