= List of metropolitan areas in Gujarat =

Metropolitan areas in Gujarat

A metropolitan area or metro is a region consisting of a densely populated urban core and its less populated surrounding territories under the same administrative division, sharing industry, infrastructure and housing. Based on these faculties Ahmedabad is the largest metropolitan area in Gujarat.

This is a list of metropolitan areas by population in Gujarat. The 74th Amendment to the Indian Constitution defines a metropolitan area as:

An area having a population of 10 Lakh or 1 Million or more, comprised in one or more districts and consisting of two or more Municipalities or Panchayats or other contiguous areas, specified by the Governor by public notification to be a Metropolitan area.

List of metropolitan areas in Gujarat

== List ==
List is based on the data of cities by Population.

Rank	City	District	Type	Population (2021)
1	Ahmedabad	Ahmedabad	Metropolis	8,253,000
2	Surat	Surat	Metropolis	7,645,384
3	Vadodara	Vadodara	Metropolis	3,041,791
4	Rajkot	Rajkot	Metropolis	27,90,640

== See also ==
- List of cities in Gujarat by population
- List of metropolitan areas in India
- List of million-plus urban agglomerations in India
- List of cities in Gujrat by school
