= Bamroli–Althan Expressway =

Road in Surat, India

Bamroli Althan Expressway
- Middle Ring Road

Route information
- Length: 7 km (4.3 mi)

Major junctions
- West end: Bamroli
- Daksheshwar Junction
- East end: Althan

Location
- Country: India
- States: Gujarat

Highway system
- Roads in India; Expressways; National; State; Asian

The Bamroli Althan Expressway (also known as Middle Ring Road) is a 7 km (4.3 mi) city highway serving the city of Surat, India. It is one of the busiest and most important roads in the Surat Metropolitan Area and is a part of the Middle Ring Road, Surat. It is generally 6 lanes wide (3 lanes in each direction). It is an east–west artery of Surat connecting the Bamroli to Althan.

The Expressway begins at Daksheshwar Junction and stretches up to Althan. It has heavy traffic during rush hours – southbound traffic in the morning rush hour; while westbound traffic during the evenings. It is used by an estimated 20,000 passenger cars daily. The Express Highway is one of the several key roads widened and improved under the Surat Urban Renewal Mission, by firms contracted by the Surat Municipal Corporation.
