= Malpur, Aravalli =

Malpur Manya
- Census town
- Location in Gujarat, India Malpur (India)
- Coordinates: 23.359094°N 73.464550°E
- Country: India
- State: Gujarat
- District: Aravalli district
- Elevation: 4 m (13 ft)

Population (2001)
  - Total: 6,510

Languages
  - Official: Gujarati, Hindi
- Time zone: UTC+5:30 (IST)
- Postal code: 383345
- Vehicle registration: GJ-31
- Website: gujaratindia.com

Malpur is a census town in Aravalli district in the Indian state of Gujarat.

== History ==
Malpur State was an Indian princely state founded about the middle of the fifteenth century. According to local belief, the village of Malpur is said to have been named after Mala Khant, who was an early local ruler of the area.Rawal Virajmal, son of Rao Kiratsinghji of Idar State, was succeeded on 12 April 1882 by his son Rawal Dipsinhji Sheosinhji, born in 1863.

The last ruler was Rawal Shri Gambhirsinhji Himatsinhji, born 27 October 1914 and who acceded to the throne on 23 June 1923. He was educated at Scott College, Sadra and Mayo College, Ajmer and nominally ruled until 1947 when Malpur State was merged with Baroda State under the Attachment Scheme in December 1943. Finally Baroda State acceded to the Indian Union on 1 May 1949.

== Geography ==
Malpur is located at 23.359094°N 73.464550°E. It has an average elevation of 4 metres (13 feet).

== Demographics ==
As of 2001 India census, Malpur had a population of 6,510. Males constitute 52% of the population and females 48%. Malpur has an average literacy rate of 72%, higher than the national average of 59.5%: male literacy is 79%, and female literacy is 64%. In Malpur, 12% of the population is under 6 years of age.

== Connectivity ==
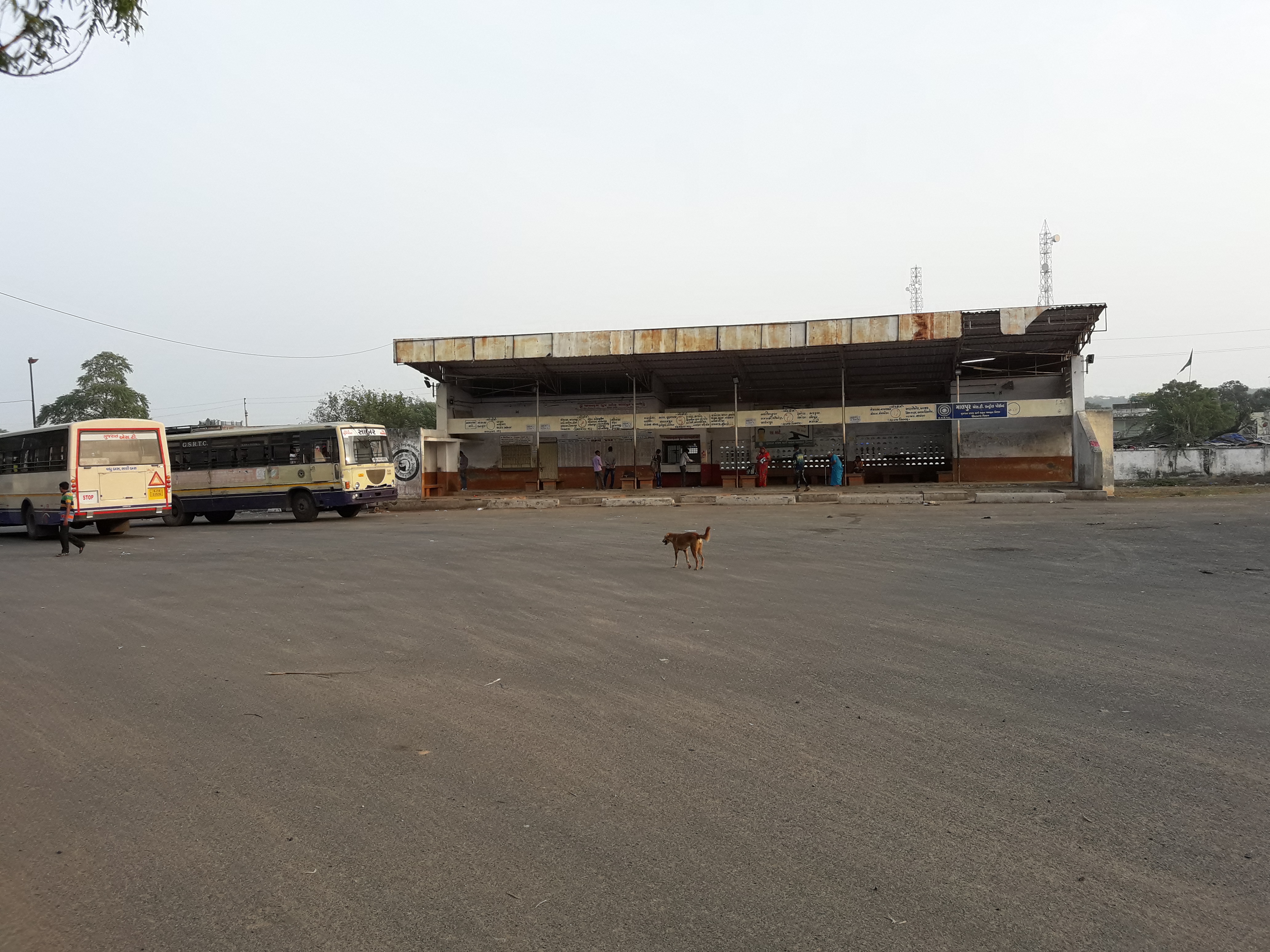
Malpur GSRTC Bus Station

Malpur is connected to all major towns of Gujarat by public transport service operated by GSRTC.
