= Modasa =

Modasa Modasa
- City
- Nickname: Modasa
- Location in Gujarat, India Modasa (India)
- Coordinates: 23.47°N 73.3°E
- Country: India
- State: Gujarat
- District: Aravalli
- Region: North Gujarat

Area
  - Total: 83 km^{2} (32 sq mi)
- Elevation: 197 m (646 ft)

Population (2011)
  - Total: 67,648
  - Density: 5,022.1/km^{2} (13,007/sq mi)
- Time zone: UTC+5:30 (IST)
- PIN: 383315
- Telephone code: 091-2774-
- Vehicle registration: GJ-31
- Sex ratio: 923 female per 1000 male ♂/♀
- Website: gujarat.gov.in

Modasa is a city and a municipality in Aravalli district in the Indian state of Gujarat.

The city became the headquarters of the new Aravalli district, carved out from Sabarkantha, on 15 August 2013.

It is an economic centre for agricultural exports, at both the provincial and national levels. As a centre for the surrounding villages, Modasa acts as a transportation hub for both residents and tourists, and has two large hospitals. The city also provides a nucleus of doctors for the people of northern Gujarat and some migrants of southern Rajasthan. Modasa is emerging as an education center for the area, with new pharmacy and engineering colleges and CBSE school supplementing the more traditional educational faculties. The city now has colleges of law, science, education, arts, commerce, and pharmacy, as well as business administration to MBA, BBA and BCA levels.

== History ==
The history of Modasa dates back thousands of years. It is believed that region around Modasa has been populated since the days of Indus valley civilization. Many architectural items, coins, religious artifacts, brick etc. are found at excavation sites around Modasa. These findings are evidence of the prominent role Modasa played during various periods of Indian history. Modasa has been place of significance in the times of Mauryas, Shatvahns, Kshtraps Guptas, Maritrakas, Rastrakutas etc. Copper plates with inscription from the reigns of King bhoja were found in Kokapur, Modasa. Modasa is also referred in the Harsola copper plate as one of the town granted by king Siyaka.

It was an important frontier fortified post during Gujarat Sultanate (1415) under Sultan Ahmed Shah I. During Mughal times it served as a resting place for travellers to Mecca via Surat port. At the close of the sixteenth century it was the chief place in a tract of 162 villages, yielding a yearly revenue of £80,000 (Rs. 8,00,000). Under the Mughals, Shahab-ud-din, the 3rd Viceroy (1577-1583), repaired the fort at Modasa, and stationing a party of cavalry there completely settled the country. During the eighteenth century Modasa greatly declined, and when (1818) it came under British management, the town was most backward. Quickly recovering, it had in 1825 a numerous and respectable body of traders with an estimated capital of £90,000 (Rs. 9,00,000).

There was a British passenger ship named after Modasa. The SS Modasa was one of a class of six near-sister ships owned by British-India Steam Navigation Co. Built by Swan Hunter & Wigham Richardson.

== Geography ==
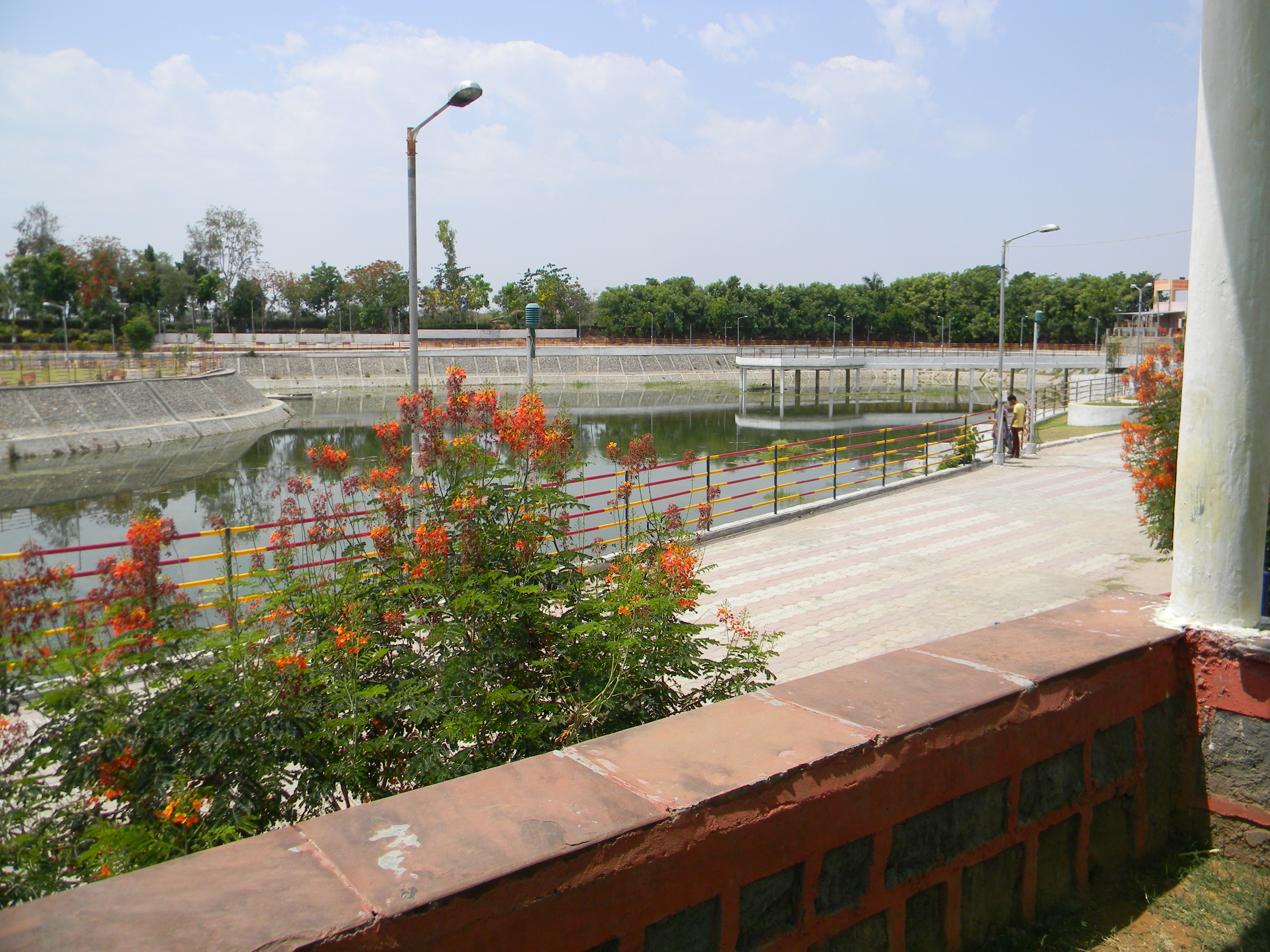
Odhari Lake

Modasa is located at 23.47°N 73.3°E. It has an average elevation of 197 metres (646 feet). Most of the water for Modasa comes from the Mazum river, on which, about 5 kilometers from Modasa, the Mazum reservoir is situated.

== Demographics ==
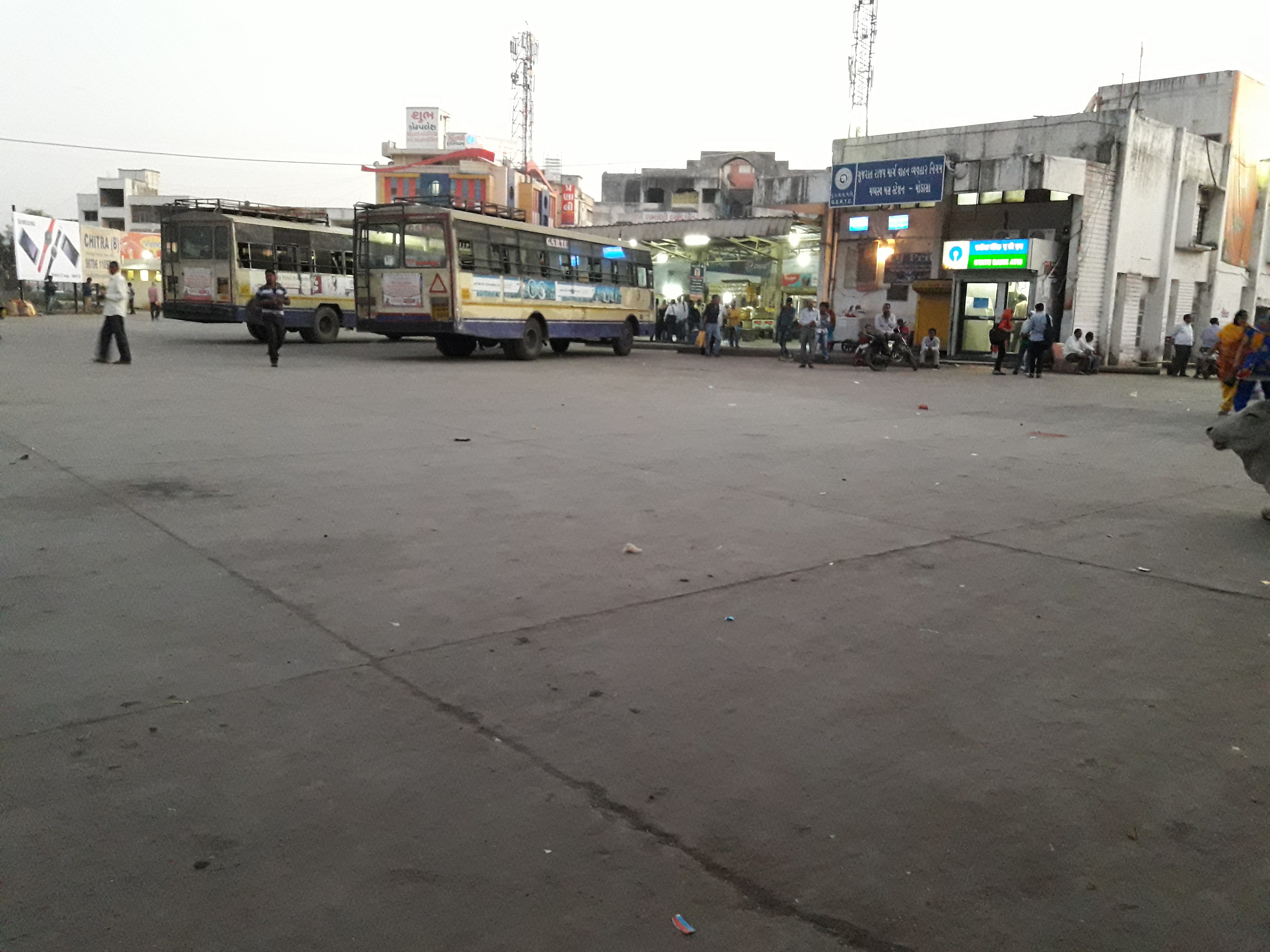
GSRTC bus depot Modasa

As of the 2001 India census, Modasa had a population of 90,000. The population is 51% male and 49% female. Modasa has an average literacy rate of 74%, higher than the national average of 59.5%; male literacy is 81%, with female literacy at 67%. In Modasa, 13% of the population is under 6 years of age.

== Notable residents ==
- Jivaraj Papriwal, a wealthy merchant of Modasa who had thousands of Jain images carved and transported to towns across India which bear an inscription mentioning that they were installed at Modasa in Samvat 1548
- Jigar Shah, founder of Sun Edison
- Ramanlal Soni, a Gujarati writer
- Anees Bazmee, Hindi film director
- Bhogilal Gandhi, Gujarati poet

== In popular culture ==
- An influenza outbreak in Modasa was shown in Aamir Khan's TV series Satyamev Jayate (season 2, episode 3).
- Modasa attracted news due to the gang rape and murder of a Dalit girl in 2020.
