= Aravalli district =

- District
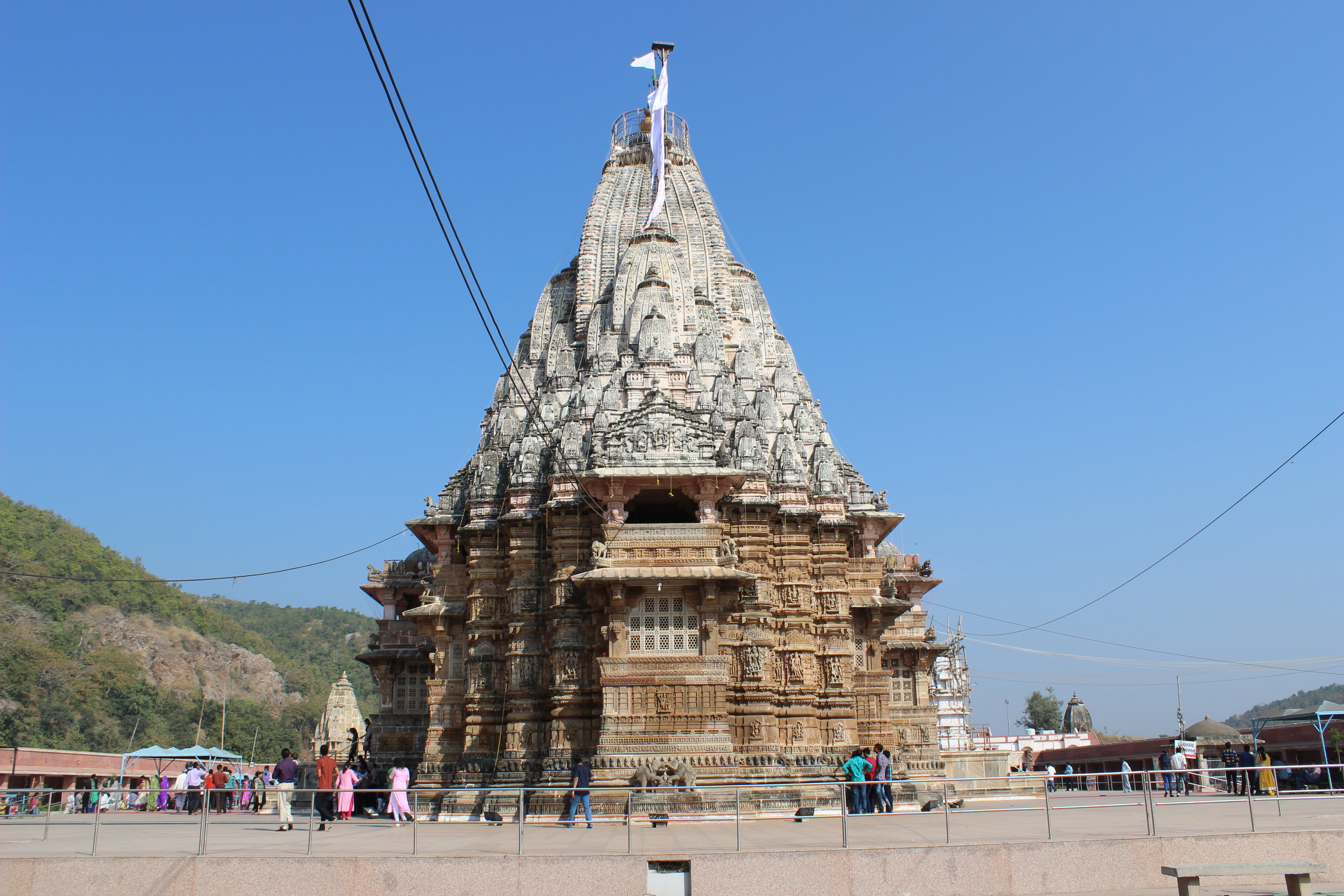
- Shamlaji Temple

- Location of Aravalli district in Gujarat
- Coordinates: 24°N 73°E
- Country: India
- State: Gujarat
- Region: North Gujarat
- Established: 15 August 2013
- Named for: Aravalli Hills

Area
  - Total: 3,308 km^{2} (1,277 sq mi)

Population (2011)
  - Total: 1,039,918
  - Density: 314.4/km^{2} (814.2/sq mi)
  - Summer (DST): IST (UTC+05:30)
- Vehicle registration: GJ-31
- Website: arvalli.nic.in

Aravalli district is a district in the state of Gujarat in India that came into being on August 15, 2013, becoming the 29th district of the state. The district has been carved out of the Sabarkantha district. The district headquarters are at Modasa.

== Etymology ==
The district has been named for the Aravalli Hills that run across Gujarat and Rajasthan. According to records with the Government of Gujarat, the Arasur branch of Aravalis passes through the regions of Danta, Modasa and Shamlaji in the district.

== History ==
It was one of 7 new districts in the state whose formation has been approved by the Government of Gujarat in 2013. The district has a large tribal population and its formation, announced in the run up to the Assembly elections in Gujarat in 2012.

== Geography ==
Aravalli district consists of Bhiloda, Meghraj, Modasa, Malpur, Dhansura and Bayad talukas of former Sabarkantha district. Of these, Meghraj, Malpur and Bhiloda are tribal dominated talukas. The district includes 676 villages and 306 village panchayats with a total population of 1.27 million and is the most literate tribal district in Gujarat.

== Demographics ==
At the time of the 2011 census Aravalli district had a population of 1,039,918, of which 126,562 (12.17%) lived in urban areas. Aravalli district had a population of 953 females per 1000 males. Scheduled Castes and Scheduled Tribes made up 62,223 (5.98%) and 213,913 (20.57%) of the population respectively.

Religion in Aravalli district (2011)
Religion	Percent
Hinduism	93.79%
Islam	5.63%
Other or not stated	0.58%

Hindus are 975,342 while Muslims are 58,536.

=== Language ===
Languages of Aravalli district (2011)
1. Gujarati (97.9%)
2. Hindi (1.31%)
3. Others (0.81%)

At the time of the 2011 census, 97.88% of the population spoke Gujarati and 1.31% Hindi as their first language.

== Politics ==
District	No.	Constituency	Name	Party	Remarks
Aravalli	30	Bhiloda (ST)	Punamchand Baranda	Bharatiya Janata Party	
Aravalli	31	Modasa	Bhikhusinh Parmar	Bharatiya Janata Party	Minister of State
Aravalli	32	Bayad	Dhavalsinh Zala	Independent	

== Places of interest ==
- Kakarai Temple Dadhaliya
- Majum dam Modasa
- Meshwo Dam Shamlaji
- Sakariya Hanuman Temple
- Shamliya Temple Shamlaji
- Shyamal Van Shamlaji
- Vatrak (Malpur)

== Talukas ==
Aravalli district has 8 talukas:

1. Modasa
2. Malpur
3. Dhansura
4. Bhiloda
5. Bayad
6. Meghraj

7 Shamlaji 8 Sathamba

== Villages ==
- Akrund
- Amodara
- Choila
- Untarda
- Ramas
- Limb
- Limbhoi
- Tenpur
- Rajpur (vadagam)

== Economy ==
Aravalli district has the first private sector, 5 MW solar power plant of Gujarat at Kharoda near Modasa. The district is industrially backward, having no major industrial units although small scale industrial areas exist in Modasa, Bhiloda and Dhansura talukas. The Mazum is a major river in the region with two large dams on it. Another major river is the Watrak River.

== Notable people ==
- Patel Mahendrabhai Somabhai
