= Rampur, Kheda district =

RAMPUR
- Village
- Location in Gujarat, India RAMPUR (India)
- Coordinates: 22.39°N 72.46°E
- Country: India
- State: Gujarat
- District: Kheda

Population
  - Total: 3,000

Languages
  - Official: Gujarati,
- Time zone: UTC+5:30 (IST)
- PIN: 387710
- Telephone code: 0268-2585/86
- Vehicle registration: GJ-7
- Nearest city: KHEDA
- Lok Sabha Kheda parliamentary constituency: Matar assembly constituency
- Avg. summer temperature: 44 °C (111 °F)
- Avg. winter temperature: 14 °C (57 °F)
- Website: gujaratindia.com

Rampur (/ˈrɑːmpʊər/) is a village in Kheda district, Gujarat, India. It is located at 22°39'27"N / 72°46'26"E and 3 km far east of Vaso.

== Location and administration ==
Rampur is a village in Vaso Taluka in Kheda District of Gujarat State, India. It is located 16 km towards South from District headquarters Kheda. 11 km from . 76 km from State capital Gandhinagar.

Rampur Pin code is 387710 and postal head office is Ramol .

Vaso (3 km), Pij (3 km), Bamroli (4 km), Kaloli (4 km), Palana (4 km) are the nearby villages to Rampur. Rampur is surrounded by Sojitra Taluka towards south, Matar Taluka towards west, Petlad Taluka towards south, Kheda Taluka towards west.

Nadiad, Kheda, Anand, Mehmedabad are the nearby cities to Rampur.

Rampur local language is Gujarati. Rampur village total population is 3000 and number of houses are 700. Village literacy rate is 95%.

== Education ==
Govt Primary and Govt Secondary Schools are available in this Village.

== Agriculture ==
Maize, Tobacco and Pearlmillet(bajra) are agriculture commodities grow in this village. 24 hours agricultural power supply in summer and winter is available in this village. Total irrigated area in this village is 354.66 hectares from canals 76.24 hectares and from Boreholes/Tube wells 278.42 hectares are the Sources of irrigation.

== Communication ==
Sub Post Office is available in this Village. LandLine available. Mobile Coverage is available. Internet Centre available in this village. No Private Courier Facility in less than 3 km.

== Transportation ==
Public Bus service available in this village. Nearest Railway Station is in less than 5 km. Autos Available in this Village.

No Nearest National Highway in less than 10 km. State Highway passes through this village. District Road passes through this village. Pucca road and Foot Path are other Roads and Transportation within the village.

== Commerce ==
Nearest ATM is in less than 5 km. Nearest Commercial Bank is in less than 5 km. Cooperative Bank available in this village. Agricultural Credit Society is available in this village.

== Other amenities ==
This Village has an Anganwadi centre, ASHA, Birth & Death registration office, Daily News Paper and Polling station are the other amenities in the village.
