= Telnar =

- Village
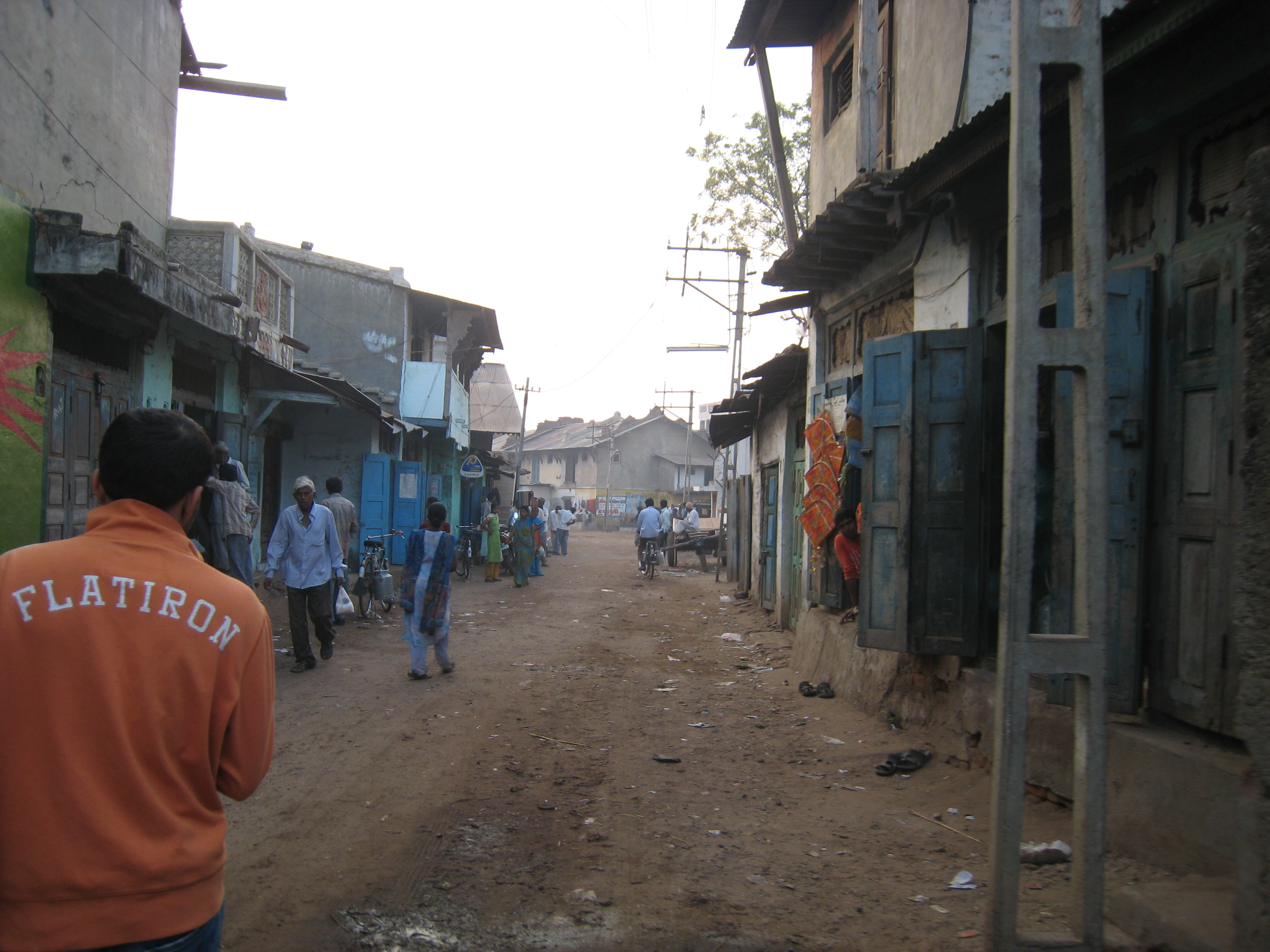
- Village street

- Location in Gujarat, India Telnar (India)
- Coordinates: 23.01°N 73.03°E
- Country: India
- State: Gujarat
- District: Kheda

Area
  - Total: 5 km^{2} (1.9 sq mi)
- Elevation: 30 m (98 ft)

Population (2011)
  - Total: 10,147
  - Density: 2,029/km^{2} (5,260/sq mi)

Languages
  - Official: Gujarati, Hindi
- Time zone: UTC+5:30 (IST)
- Postal code: 387650≤
- Telephone code: 02691 285
- Vehicle registration: GJ 7
- Website: gujaratindia.com

Telnar or Telnal is a village in Kapadvanj Taluka in Kheda district of Gujarat state, India.

== Geography ==
Nearby villages are Nirmali, Lalpur, Abvel and Bhungariya. The village mainly consists of farmland on the outskirts with mountains and the Vatrak river.

== Places of interest ==
On the bank of Vatrak river, about a mile from the village, there is a very old and lately repaired temple of Kedareshvar. Other major temple includes Utkanteshwar Mahadev situated 4 km from Telnar and located on the bank of the Vatrak river.

== Communities ==
Kadva Patel is major community in the village. Telnar is one of more than 40 villages that have formed the Savaso Gaur Kadva Patidar Samaj organisation.

- Kadva Patel
- Rabari
- Prajapati
- Vaniya
- Valand
- Rajput
- Harijan
- Suthar
- Ravariya
- Vanjara

== Economy ==
Agriculture and dairy business plays a large part in the region's prosperity. Agricultural goods primarily consist of potatoes, cotton, fennel seeds, pearl millet and wheat.

== Migration ==
Lack of education and skills have let down progress of the village, but recently young generations have begun migrating to nearby cities including Kapadwanj, Ahmedabad, Anand and Gandhinagar.

== Transport ==
- By road: Telnar is 13 km from Kapadwanj and 50 km from Ahmedabad.
- By rail: Nearest railway station is in Nadiad which is 50 km from Telnar.
- By air: Nearest airport is in Ahmedabad which is 40 km from Telnar.
