= Vibhut Shah =

Indian writer (born 1933)

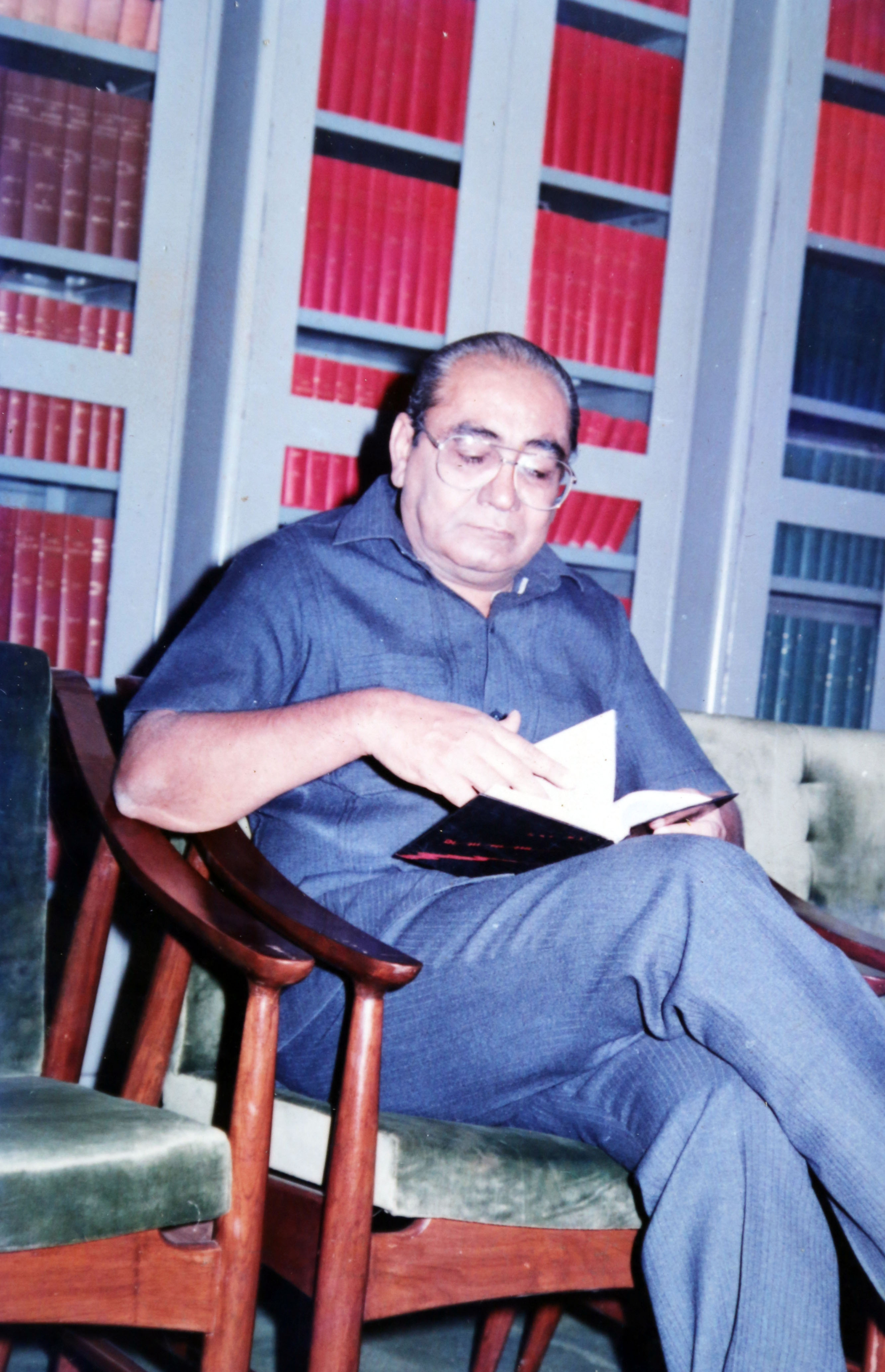
- Born: 23 June 1933 (age 93); Nadiad, British India
- Education: Gujarat University, Maharaja Sayajirao University of Baroda
- Occupations: Novelist, playwright, short story writer
- Writing career
- Language: Gujarati
- Years active: 1968–2012
- Genre: Romantic fiction

Signature
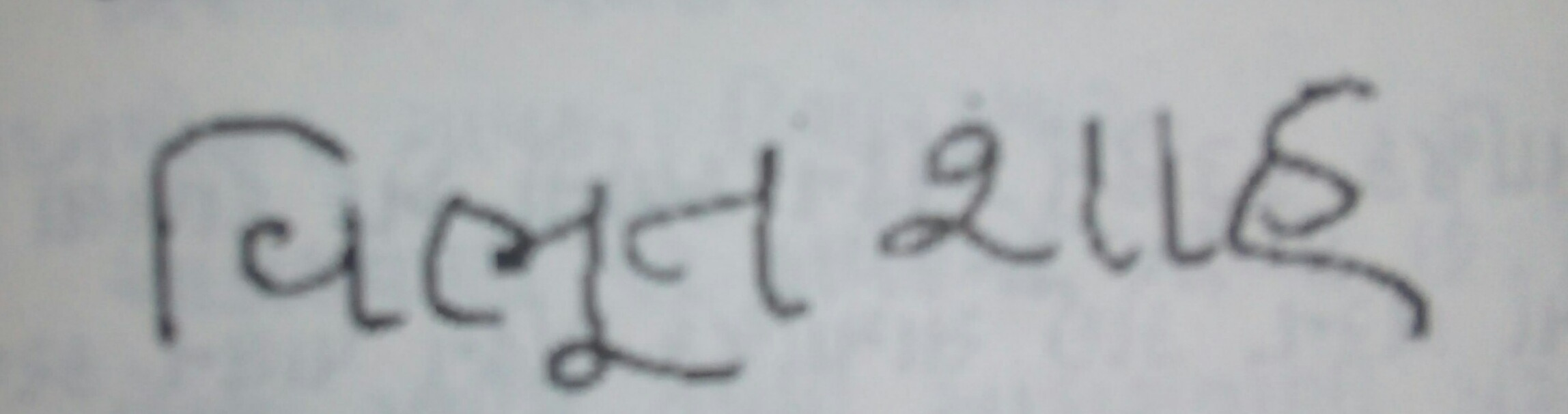

Vibhut Shah (born 23 June 1933) is an Indian contemporary Gujarati novelist, playwright, and short story writer.

== Early life ==
Vibhut Shah was born on 23 June 1933 in Nadiad (now in Kheda district, Gujarat, India). His father, Champaklal, was a lawyer. He was the second of three siblings, with an elder brother, Navin, and a younger sister, Asha. His father died in 1946.

Shah completed his primary education in Nadiad and his secondary education in Kheda. He earned a B.A. in English and Gujarati in 1956 from L. D. Arts College, affiliated with Gujarat University, Ahmedabad. He later obtained a LL.B. degree and a diploma in Library Science in 1963 from Maharaja Sayajirao University of Baroda.

In 1957, Shah moved to Jamnagar and joined M. P. Shah Medical College as a librarian, where he worked until 1965. He subsequently served as Chief Librarian at the Gujarat High Court from 1966 until his retirement, completing a total of twenty-six years of service at the institution.

Shah began writing in the mid-1960s and has since published several collections of short stories, one-act plays, and novels. He received eleven literary awards from various institutions, primarily government bodies. He was also active in the Gujarati theatre movement and wrote radio plays. His notable works include Asangati, Ambiya-Bahar, Kartak Kare Shringar, and Angaar–Ashlesh.

== Literary career ==
=== 1959–1968 ===
During his Bachelor of Arts studies, Shah was influenced by Niranjan Bhagat and S. R. Bhatt, who encouraged his interest in contemporary literature. He wrote his first short story, Dhummas Ni Shristi, in 1959, which was published in the magazine Yuvak in 1960. Between 1960 and 1963, he wrote several short stories, some of which appeared in the magazine Kumar and the newspaper Sandesh. His writing activity slowed when he moved to Vadodara from 1962 to 1963 to pursue studies in Library Science at The Maharaja Sayajirao University of Baroda.

Shah resumed writing between 1966 and 1968, producing short stories that were later published in magazines such as Navneet Samarpan, Kruti, Srirang, and Ruchi. While studying law at a law college in Jamnagar, he wrote his first radio play, Pratishodh, in 1965 for a Best Radio Play competition organised by Ahmedabad's radio station, Akashvani. The play was well received, following which he wrote approximately one hundred radio plays over the years, many of which were regularly broadcast.

=== 1968–1987 ===
Shah's first short story collection, Tekariyo Par Vasant Bethi Chhe, was published in 1968 and received favourable critical response, establishing his presence in Gujarati literature. In 1969, the book received the second prize for Best Book of the Year from the Government of Gujarat. His first collection of one-act plays, Laal Piro Ane Vadari, was published in 1970 and won the Best One-act Plays Collection of the Year award from the Government of Gujarat. The book was later included in the Bachelor of Arts curriculum at Saurashtra University in 1972.

Following this, Shah published his second one-act play collection, Shanti Na Pakshi, in 1974, which received the same award in 1975. In 1979, his three-act play Bheena Bheena Dankh was staged for twenty performances in Ahmedabad. The production was mounted by Natyadeep, an institute founded by Shah to promote Gujarati theatre.

=== 1988–2012 ===
After gaining recognition for his short stories and one-act plays, Shah turned to writing novels. His first novel, Asangati, written during 1987–1988, was published to critical and popular acclaim and won the Best Novel of the Year award from the Gujarat Sahitya Akademi in 1989. Between 1989 and 2005, he wrote several novels that further established his reputation as a contemporary Gujarati novelist. These include Saptaparna (1989), Amavasya (1990), Sambhavami (1992), Agnimegh (1993), Ambiya-Bahar (1995), Kartak Kare Shringar (2001), Angar–Ashlesh (2003), and Na Sur Na Sargam (2005).

During this period, Shah also published two collections of one-act plays, Mamuni Na Shyam Gulab (1990) and Nat Kedar (1992), as well as two short story collections, Flower Vase (1988) and Kunjar (1994). Flower Vase received the Best Short Story Collection award from the Gujarat Sahitya Akademi in 1989, while Mamuni Na Shyam Gulab was awarded the second prize of the Shri Batubhai Umarvadia Award for Best One-act Play in 1992.

After a prolonged interval, Shah published his final short story collection, Shesh Kathachakra, in April 2012.

== Awards ==
Vibhut Shah received several literary awards during his writing career.

No	Year	Title	Award	Institution
1	1969	Tekariyo Par Vasant Bethi Chhe	Second prize – Best Book of the Year	Government of Gujarat, India
2	1971	Laal Piro Ane Vadari	First prize – Best One-act Plays Collection	Government of Gujarat, India
3	1972	Hoo Be	Dr Jayant Khatri Award for Best Gujarati Short Story (published between 1966 and 1968)	Dr Jayant Khatri Memorial Committee, Mandvi, Kutch
4	1972	Aatla Varsho Pachhi Pan	Shri Vaju Kotak Award for Best Short Story	Chitralekha magazine
5	1975	Shanti Na Pakshi	First prize – Best One-act Plays Collection	Government of Gujarat, India
6	1978	Bandish	First prize – Best Short Story Collection	Government of Gujarat, India
7	1978	Chandra No Dagh	Shri Prithviraj Kapoor Award for Best Play	Physical Research Laboratory, Ahmedabad
8	1989	Flower Vase	First prize – Best Short Story Collection	Gujarat Sahitya Akademi
9	1989	Asangati	First prize – Best Novel of the Year	Gujarat Sahitya Akadami
10	1992	Mamuni Na Shyam Gulab	Second prize – Shri Batubhai Umarvadia Award for Best One-act Play	Gujarati Sahitya Parishad
11	1993	Vahala Pappa	First prize – Best Humorous Play, All India Radio Competition	Government of India

== Major works acknowledged in other forms of media and arts ==
=== Novels published in Gujarati newspapers ===
During his active literary career, several of Shah's novels were serialised in the Sunday editions of leading Gujarati newspapers, which contributed to his wider recognition among Gujarati readers. His first novel to be published in a newspaper was Saptaparna in 1989, after Hasmukh Gandhi, then editor-in-chief of the newspaper Samakalin, sought Shah's consent to publish it in the paper's Sunday edition. The novel was also published simultaneously in Jansatta and received a positive response from readers.

Following the reception of Saptaparna, the same newspapers published another of his novels, Sambhavami, in 1992. Subsequently, several of his novels appeared in major Gujarati newspapers, including Gujarat Samachar, Sandesh, Jansatta, and Mumbai Samachar. These included Ambiya-Bahar in Sandesh (1994), Kartak Kare Shringar in Jansatta (1998–1999), Angar–Ashlesh in Gujarat Samachar (2003), and Na Sur Na Sargam in Mumbai Samachar (2004–2005).

=== Inclusion in study courses ===
Shah's first collection of one-act plays, Laal Piro Ane Vadari, was included in the Bachelor of Arts curriculum at Saurashtra University in 1972. In 1993, his radio play Fakt Pandar Minute (Only Fifteen Minutes), written for Akashvani, was included as part of the Class X Gujarati language syllabus by the Gujarat Secondary Education Board (GSEB), Gandhinagar. The work remained in the curriculum for twelve years.

=== Plays and adaptations ===
In 1978, a telefilm based on Shah's first radio play, Pratishodh, was produced and later telecast on Ahmedabad Doordarshan. Another three-act play written by Shah, Jambli Rang Ni Kanya (Purple-Coloured Girl), was staged in Ahmedabad in 1998 by the theatre group Rangbahar.

The National Institute for the Visually Handicapped, Mumbai, produced an audio cassette set of his novel Amavasya for visually impaired readers during 2004–2005. In July 2008, Shah's short story Manasnu Maun (The Face of a Man) was selected by Suresh Dalal for inclusion in the anthology Varta-Viswa, published in August 2010.

=== Other contributions to Gujarati literature ===
During his active years, Shah served on the judging panel of one-act play competitions organised by the INT drama institute of Mumbai, in association with the Gujarati newspaper Gujarat Samachar. These competitions featured amateur artists from colleges across Gujarat. Shah also wrote critical reviews of these competitions for Gujarat Samachar between 1989 and 2006.

== Bibliography ==
The following is a list of Vibhut Shah's published works:

No.	Title	English translation	Year	Type
1	Tekariyo Par Vasant Bethi Chhe	The Spring on the Hills	1968	Short story collection
2	Laal Piro Ane Vadari	Red, Yellow, and Blue	1970	One-act play collection
3	Shanti Na Pakshi	Birds of Peace	1974	One-act play collection
4	Bandish	Composition	1977	Short story collection
5	Flower Vase	Flower Vase	1988	Short story collection
6	Asangati	Inconsistencies	1988	Novel
7	Saptaparna	Seven Leaves	1989	Novel
8	Mamuni Na Shyam Gulab	Black Roses of Mamuni	1990	One-act play collection
9	Amavasya	The Last Day of the Lunar Month	1990	Novel
10	Sambhavami	I Exist	1992	Novel
11	Nat Kedar	A Musical Note in Indian Classical Music	1992	One-act play collection
12	Agnimegh	A Bright Cloud in an Overcast Sky	1993	Novel
13	Kunjar	Green Foliage of the Grove	1994	Short story collection
14	Ambiya-Bahar	A Second Spring in a Mango Grove	1995	Novel
15	Kartak Kare Shringar	A Love Play of the Lunar Month Kartak	2001	Novel
16	Angar–Ashlesh	The Embrace of Fire	2003	Novel
17	Na Sur Na Sargam	Neither a Melody nor a Musical Composition	2005	Novel
18	Shesh Kathachakra	The Unfinished Circle of Stories	2012	Short story collection

== See also ==
- List of Gujarati-language writers
