= Mahemdavad =

Mahemdabad Mahemdabad, Mahmudabad
- Town
- Nickname: Memdavad
- Location in Gujarat, India Mahemdabad (India)
- Coordinates: 22.83°N 72.77°E
- Country: India
- State: Gujarat
- District: Kheda
- Founder: Mahmud Begada

Government
  - Type: Municipality
- Elevation: 33 m (108 ft)

Population (2001)
  - Total: 30,769
- Demonym: Mahemdavadi

Languages
- Time zone: UTC+5:30 (IST)
- PIN: 387130
- Telephone code: 02694 or 912694
- Vehicle registration: GJ 07
- Nearest city: Kheda

Mahemdavad is a town with municipality in the Kheda district in the Indian state of Gujarat. Mahemdavad is situated on the Vatrak River bank. The nearest city is Kheda. It is 30 km from largest city of Gujarat, Ahmedabad.

Nearest airport to reach here is Sardar Vallabhbhai Patel International Airport.

In Mahemdabad, there's a renowned historical park called Kashi Bagh, donated to the government by the Shah family in honor of Kashiba Ranchhoddas Shah, a cherished wife, mother, and grandmother. This serene park features both a playground for children and ideal for leisurely walks or jogging.

== Etymology ==
Mahemdavad was established by the king Mahmud Begada, the grandson of Ahmed Shah, and it was initially named as Mahmudabad after king Mahmud.

== Geography ==
Mahemdavad is located at 22.83°N 72.77°E. It has an average elevation of 33 metres (108 ft).

== Demographics ==
As of 2001 India census, Mahemdavad has a population of 30,769. Males constitute 52% of the population and females 48%. Mahemdavad has an average literacy rate of 70%, higher than the national average of 59.5%: male literacy is 77%, and female literacy is 63%. In Mahemdavad, 12% of the population is under 6 years of age.

== Places of interest ==
Shree Siddhivinayak Devsthan

The Shree Siddhivinayak Devsthan is one of its kinds in complete of the India as it is the biggest temple in structure and with an inbuilt lift facility. The Jyot for the temple was brought from Mumbai Siddhivinayak Temple. With the blessing and prayers of great saints the Bhumi Poojan was conducted on the 09-03-2011 Wednesday in presence of the Purohit Family. The development of the complete project is headed personally by Mr. Narendra Purohit and the estimated time for completion is approximately 1 year. It is one of the biggest temple of Lord Ganesha in India and located on the Ahmedabad-Mahemdavad Highway

Bhammariyo Kuvo

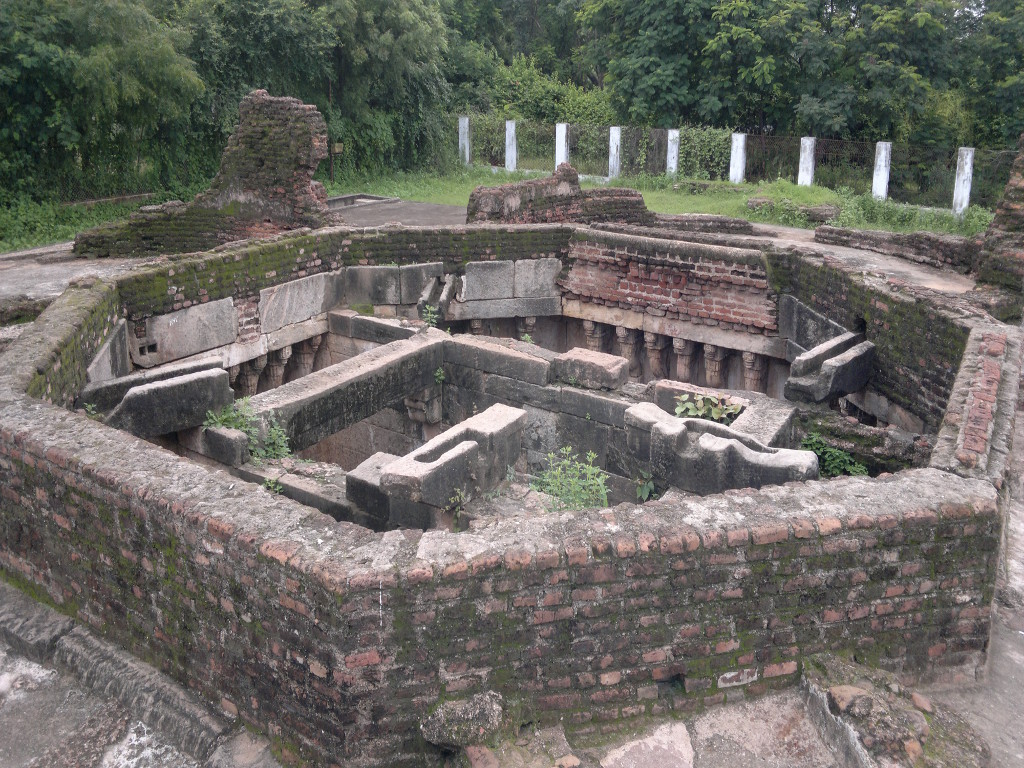
Bhammariyo Kuvo

This is an ancient well with seven floors (storeys) below the ground. Each floor has a different architecture. Currently floors four to seven of the well are filled so visitors are only able to view the top three floors. It was built during the Gujarat Sultanate.

Roja Roji

Roja Roji is a Maqbara (Dargah Sarif of Mubarak Said, R.A.) located near Ghodali village with a distance of 3 km from Mahemdavad. Roja Roji is a holy place for Muslims. The myth about Roja Roji is that one cannot count the pillars of the building. Every time one counts, one gets a different figure. People get confused while counting because of its architectural design.

Chanda-Suraj Mahel

Chanda-Suraj Mahel was a palace but now it has been destroyed but some broken walls are still there. It is located on the bank of river Vatrak of Mahemdavad

== Education ==
Educational institutes of Mahemdabad include: Shanti Niketan English School, Seth J. H. Sonawala High School, St. Xavier's High School, English Teaching School (ETS), Vedanta High School and the local municipal school. A PTC (Primary Teachers' Certificate) college has come up recently in the town. Most of the schools instruct their students in Gujarati & English.

=== Schools ===
- Shanti Niketan English School runs nursery to 6th in English medium. International methodology applied keeping Indian values as high priority.
- Sheth J. H. Sonawala High School runs 5th std. to 12th std. in science, commerce and arts stream in Gujarati medium.
- Gyanjyot High School runs 1st std. to 12th std. in commerce and arts stream in Gujarati medium.
- St. Xavier's School runs KG TO 12th std with science and commerce streams. Also English medium from KG to 5th std.
- Trinity High School runs KG to 10th std. in English and Gujarati medium.
- Santram primary school runs 1st std. to 7th std.
- Shree Nyalkaran English Medium School runs from 1st std.
- Shree Sarvoday Vidhya Mandir Modaj, Mahemdavad runs 9th std to 12th std.
- English Teaching School runs Playgroup to 12th std.

=== Colleges ===
Government Polytechnic Kheda (Govt of Gujarat) is situated near Raska Wier in Mahemdabad Taluka (tahesil) under Gujarat Technological University.

These colleges all run under Gujarat University:

- Manekchock Co-Op. Bank Arts & Mahemdabad Urban People's Co-Op. Bank Commerce College runs graduation in commerce and arts stream
- The Mahemdabad Education Society B. Ed. College
- Degree College of Physical Education
- Gayatri Kelavani Mandal Sanchalit B. P. E. and Yoga College
- D. A. Diploma Engineering and Technology

== Economy ==
The market place is situated at the heart of the town. The market area is marked by the Virol Darwaja (gate). The market remains open on all days except for Saturday. A variety of small scale cottage industries are found in Mahemdabad. The most popular is the leather bag cottage industry. People from surrounding cities come specially to Mahemdabad to buy purses, hand bags and school bags. In addition, the cobbler is also very famous for his ever-lasting shoes. Apart from these, there are a number of cloth merchants, pharmacies, one or two gold merchants, a few utensils merchants et cetera. On the whole trade and commerce are developed to a good extent here.

Surrounding the market area, a number of residential societies have developed. The oldest of these are: Navjeevan-1,2 and Bapukaka society. These are situated right beside the railway station. There is a Shiv temple in Navjeevan-1. During the festival of Navaratri, people celebrate and play Garba in the yard of this Shiv temple. New society areas like Ashutosh, Sarvoday Society, Mrudul Park, Shroff Nagar, Jyoti Park etc. have developed on the road opposite to the Virol Darwaja. Recently, there are many new residentials have been developed on the Mahemdavad-Khatraj Road like Radhe Kishan Park, Vatsalya Society, Pushpavan Society, etc. And so many new society/flats are under constructions.

Entertainment is very limited in this town. There are only 1 theatre named Revolution Cinema which screens Hindi & Gujarati movies.

As well as a municipal hospital, there are private hospitals, the main one being Lucky Hospital just outside of the main market. It was established in 1985 by Dr. Vijay Ajmera father of Dr. Akash Ajmera, provides very good care for its patients. Dr. Ajmera is very well known and the only MD gynecologist in the taluka of Mahemdavad which includes some 80 surrounding villages.

During the summer season, a number of gola walas (vendors) fill the road between Viral Darwaja and railway station. People are seen loitering till late nights on these roads and eating golas (gola is made by pressing small ice cubes on a wooden stick and then a flavored liquid like rose, kala khatta etc. is poured on it). In addition, one or two dabeli walas, pav bhaji walas and sugar-cane vendors make good business during the cool summer nights.

Near the railway station, there is a samadhi of Eknathji – a local saint.

There are many old buildings visible in the inner older part of the town. The town holds historical importance since its foundation in 16th Century by ruler of Gujarat sultanate, Mahmud Begada.

== Geography ==
It is located at 22°49′0″N 72°46′0″E.

== Transport ==
=== Railways ===
Mahemdavad has namedMahemadavad Kheda Road railway station as a train station and station code is MHD for halting express and superfast trains.

So many Mail Express/Superfast & every local trains stops at Mahemdavad Kheda Road Railway station.

=== Bus transport ===
National Highway 59 passes through Mahemdabad. Mahemdavad links to Ahmedabad, Surat and Ratlam.
Mahemdavad has a bus station for local/express buses which link to Nadiad, Anand, Ahmedabad, Dakor, and Kheda.
Khatraj Chokdi (The five junction road) near Mahemdavad is connected to major cities by

- Ahmedabad
- Nadiad
- Mahudha, Dakor
- Kathlal, Kapadwanj
- Mahemdavad, Kheda
- road

All the express buses stop at Khatraj Chokdi.

You can get the buses for the cities like Ahmedabad, Nadiad, Anand, Vadodara, Kheda, Patan, Mahudha, Dakor, Ambaji, Pavagadh, Bahucharaji, Petlad, Khambhat, Gandhinagar, etc.

=== Airport ===
The nearest international airport is Sardar Vallabhbhai Patel International Airport at Ahmedabad. The airport code is AMD. It is only 33 km from Mahemdavad connected by road. There are direct domestic flights to Mumbai, Delhi, Bangalore, and Kolkata. Also there are direct international flights to Hong Kong, Singapore, Dubai, Kuwait, London, Chicago and Frankfurt.
