= Matar, Kheda =

Matar Charotar Region Of Gujarat Tehsil Of Kheda District
- Village
- Location in Gujarat, India Matar (India)
- Coordinates: 22.75°N 72.68°E
- Country: India
- State: Gujarat
- District: Kheda

Population (2011)
  - Total: 15,284

Languages
  - Official: Gujarati, Hindi
- Time zone: UTC+5:30 (IST)
- Postal code: 387530
- Vehicle registration: GJ-07
- Website: gujaratindia.com

Matar is a Large village in Kheda district in the Indian state of Gujarat. Matar is Part Of Historical Salt March in 1930. The headquarters of the Matar taluka, in the 2011 census it had a population of 15,284. Matar Village is between Kheda and Khambhat. Nearest Railway Station Is Mahemadavad Kheda Road railway station. Nearest Bus Station Is Matar Bus Station (Nadiad Division) well connect to Ahmedabad- Khambhat Bus Service (GSRTC) Via Kheda. Nearest City Is Kheda (05 kms) And Nadiad (24 kms).

It was earlier known as Matbar, meaning a wealthy or prosperous village. This village has the well known Jain temple of Sachadev dedicated to Sumatinath, the fifth Jain Tirthankara.
