= Gadia =

Gadia may refer to:

- Gadia Lohar, a social group of India
- Gadia, Barabanki, a village in Uttar Pradesh, India
- Daniel Gadia (born 1995), Filipino footballer
- Dominic Gadia (born 1986), Guamanian footballer
- Gadia (month), the twelfth month of the Mandaean calendar

== See also ==
- Ghadia (disambiguation)
