= Anara =

Anara may refer to:

== Places ==
- Anara, Nigeria, a town in Imo State, Nigeria
- Anara, Iran, a village in Markazi Province, Iran
- Anara, Kheda, a village in Gujarat, India
- Anara, Purulia, a village in West Bengal, India
- Anara Tower, a proposed tower in Dubai, UAE

== People with the name ==
- Anara Gupta (born 1989), Indian model
- Anara Naeem, Maldivian politician and Islamic scholar
