= Antroli =

Coordinates: 23°00′N 73°01′E

- village
- Interactive map of Antroli
- Country: India
- State: Gujarat
- District: Kheda

Languages
  - Official: Gujarati, Hindi
- Time zone: UTC+5:30 (IST)
- PIN: 387365
- Vehicle registration: GJ 07
- Nearest city: Kapadwanj
- Climate: Dry (Köppen)
- Website: gujaratindia.com

Antroli is a mid-size village in the Kapadvanj Taluka of the Kheda district in central Gujarat Its current population is about 8500 people.

== Agriculture and occupation ==
The primary occupation is farming and cattle breeding. There is a co-operative milk collection center, which provides infrastructure to the village population to eke out a living, supplementing their income along with the farming activity. The dairy supplies milk to Amul dairy in Anand.

Antroli in the past was famous for groundnut, sweet potato carrot and radish cultivation. Now the main crops grown are Tobacco, Sweet potato, Castor seeds, Wheat, millet, cotton, vegetables and Nilgiri [eucalyptus].

== People ==
The population consists of Patels / Patidars, Darbar, Brahmins, Muslims, Harijans, Madaris, etc.

There are about 100 families of snake charmers community, who mainly live an itinerant life, but have been allocated land in gochar land of the village now called Madaripura, to build houses and settle down.

=== Emigration ===
About 100 families mainly from the Patel community have migrated to foreign countries for a better life, led by Arvindbhai Naranbhai Patel to the United States in 1965 for master's degree in computer science after receiving bachelor's degree in Electrical Engineering degree in L D Engineering college. Jashubhai Naranbhai immigrated to the United States in 1967 for Medical Surgery Taining after receiving MBBS degree from MS University in Baroda.

More than 200 families have migrated to other parts of Gujarat and India for better education, opportunities and living standards.

The migration started around 1940's, led by Janab Jhaver Ali Sayyed who established a bidi making unit in Gondia of Maharastra State, followed by Sri Vijaykumar Vaheribhai Manilal Patel, who after obtaining an engineers diploma migrated to Goa in 1963, post liberation by the Portuguese.
