= Kanij =

Coordinates: 22°52′N 72°42′E

Kanij is a village in Mehmedabad Taluka in Kheda District of Gujarat State, India. It is about 37m above sea level. Kanij is located 15 km towards the north from district headquarters Kheda. The primary language spoken is Gujarati. 15 km from Ahmedabad. 47 km from the state capital Gandhinagar.

Kanij village has higher education rate compared to Gujarat. In 2011, education rate of Kanij town was 86.25% compared to 78.03% of Gujarat. In Kanij Male proficiency stands at 91.95% whereas female education rate was 80.14%.

Nenpur (4 km), Malutaj (5 km), Raska (5 km), Sankhej (6 km), Lali (6 km) are villages nearby. Kanij is surrounded by Kheda Taluka towards the east, Matar Taluka towards the south, Daskroi Taluka towards then west, and Ahmadabad Taluka up north.

Mehmedabad, Kheda, Ahmedabad, and Nadiad are nearby cities to Kanij. To get to Kheda from Delhi by flight, you can go to the IGI AIRPORT NEW DELHI and take a flight to Ahemdabad. From Ahmedabad, you can taxi or bus to Kheda directly.
