= Palana, Kheda =

Palana
- village
- Location within Gujarat Location within India
- Coordinates: 22.687°N 72.757°E
- Country: India
- State: Gujarat
- District: Kheda

Languages
  - Official: Gujarati,
- Time zone: UTC+5:30 (IST)
- PIN: 387350
- Telephone code: 0268-2585,86
- Vehicle registration: GJ-7
- Nearest city: Nadiad
- Lok Sabha constituency: Kheda
- Avg. summer temperature: 44 °C (111 °F)
- Avg. winter temperature: 14 °C (57 °F)
- Website: gujaratindia.com

Palana is a village in Vaso taluka, Kheda District, Gujarat, India. It has a panchayat raj system. Two lakes are within the village boundaries, and a canal runs nearby. Communities in the village include Hindu, Rjput, Prajapati, Patel, Bhraman, Harijan, Vaishnav, and Muslim. Palana was named after Pala Patel (1222 AD).

State	Gujarat
Taluka Name	vaso
Language	Gujarati and Hindi
Time zone	IST (UTC+5:30)
Elevation	Altitude: 37 meters. Above Sea level
Telephone Code	Std Code: 0268
Assembly constituency	Matar assembly constituency
Lok Sabha constituency	Kheda parliamentary constituency
Pin Code	387350
Post Office Name	Palana
