= Santram Mandir =

Coordinates: 22.689°N 72.864°E

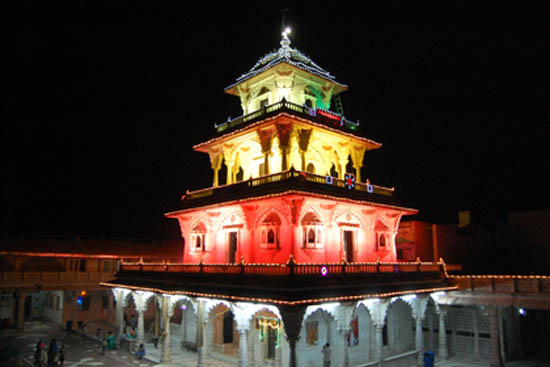
- Santram Mandir during Dev Diwali Celebration

- Location within Tamil Nadu

Religion
- Affiliation: Hinduism
- District: Kheda
- Deity: Santram Maharaj

Location
- Location: Nadiad
- State: Gujarat
- Country: India
- Interactive map of Santram Mandir

Santram Mandir is a Hindu temple in Nadiad, Gujarat, India. It is run by the Santram Maharaj organization.
