= Charotar Education Society =

Educational institute in Gujarat, India

The Charotar Education Society (CES) is an educational institute in Charotar region established on 16 April 1916. It educates students from kindergarten to post-graduate level, offering P.T.C., B.ED., Arts, Commerce and Science degree Colleges.
