= Mahudha =

Town in Gujarat, India

Mahudha મહુધા
- Taluka Of Kheda District
- Location in Gujarat, India Mahudha (India)
- Coordinates: 22.82°N 72.93°E
- Country: India
- State: Gujarat
- District: Kheda
- Region: Charotar Region Of Gujarat
- Elevation: 37 m (121 ft)

Population (2001)
  - Total: 15,780

Languages
  - Official: Gujarati, Hindi
- Time zone: UTC+5:30 (IST)
- Vehicle registration: GJ-07
- Website: USA based community website on Mahudha

Mahudha is a Village and municipality in Kheda district in the Indian state of Gujarat.Mahudha is about 25 kilometres away (SE) from the pilgrim town of Dakor. The nearest city, Nadiad, is 16 kilometres south west.

== Geography ==
Mahudha is located at 22.82°N 72.93°E. It has an average elevation of 37 metres (121 feet).

== Demographics ==
At the 2001 India census, Mahudha had a population of 15,780. Males constitute 52% of the population and females 48%. Mahudha has an average literacy rate of 69%, higher than the national average of 59.5%: male literacy is 78%, and female literacy is 59%. In Mahudha, 11% of the population is under 6 years of age.

== Religions ==
Majority of the residents are Muslim (70%) and, followed by Hindu (28%) as the second largest religious group. There is also a small Christian community (2%) and traces of worshipers from other religions such as Sikh, Jain, and Buddhist.
