= Abvel =

Village in Kheda District, Gujarat State, India

Coordinates: 23.1392°N 73.0873°E

Abvel is a village in Kapadvanj Taluk, Kheda District, Gujarat State, India. Abvel is 114.8 km from its district main city Kheda and 45 km from its state main city Gandhinagar.

== Nearby villages ==
Narshipur, Zanda, Moti Zer, Lalpur, Nirmali, Telnar, Bhungaliya, Aboch, Lal Mandva, shihora are the villages along with this village in the same Kapadvanj Taluk

Nearby villages are Shihora (2.391 km), Zanzari (2.281 km), Lalpur (2.406 km), Zanda (2.798 km), Moti Zer (3.656 km), Aboch (3.765 km), Lal Mandva (4.427 km), Vyas Vasna (4.884 km),

== Post offices ==
Abvel Pin Code is 387650 and Post office name Abvel. Other villages in Post Office (387650,) are Bhoja Na Muvada, Abvel, Nirmali, Telnar, Vyas Vasna.
