= Vithalbhai Haveli =

General information
- Type: Haveli (mansion)
- Architectural style: Local architecture of Gujarat
- Location: Vaso, Kheda district, Gujarat, India
- Coordinates: 22.6611°N 72.7558°E
- Completed: 1872
- Renovated: 1999-2001

Technical details
- Material: Wood, lime, mortar, stone, bricks
- Floor count: 4

Design and construction
- Designations: Monument of National Importance (N-GJ-142)

Vithalbhai Haveli is a haveli (mansion) in Vaso, Kheda district, Gujarat, India. It was built in the late 19th century and features four floors adorned with beautifully carved wooden pillars, window frames, beams, ceilings and doors.

== History ==
The haveli is an example of late 19th century civil architecture of the state. It was built in 1872. The haveli was restored between 1999 and 2001.

It is the Monument of National Importance (N-GJ-142).

== Architecture ==
The haveli is a large mansion raised on a square platform. It is a four storeyed building built with wooden pillars and beams with spaces between them filled with bricks and plastered with lime to create walls. The wooden structures along with wooden doors, windows and balconies are finely carved. The main entrance, street-facing front facade with its balconies and pillars are very attractively carved. The main entrance has a Ganesha carved in the centre of the lintel. The open central courtyard of the haveli is surrounded by the verandah with pillars. The courtyard has an underground tank for storing rainwater. There are two large vestibules and thirteen rooms of various sizes on the ground floor. The interior pillars has a stone bases and the wooden capitals and brackets which are finely carved with floral and geometric patterns. The frames of the lattice windows of the ground floor are carved with various patterns and has paintings of various Hindu deities including Krishna and Vishnu.

The main hall on the first floor has a decorated wooden ceiling. The other rooms on the first floor have false ceilings with floral, geometric and various other patterns. The ceiling of the hall on the second floor is carved with some floral patterns inlaid with ivory. The balconies of the first and second floors are supported by wooden struts and brackets carved in shapes of animals. The top floor is open on three sides, except south. The rooms on this floor have a frontal hall with decorated arches and brackets. There are carved rings for a swing.
