= Narsanda, India =

Village in Gujarat, India

Coordinates: 25°22′N 85°27′E

Narsanda is a village in the Kheda district of Gujarat, India.
