= Vaso, India =

Vaso
- village

- Location in Gujarat, India Vaso (India)
- Coordinates: 22.66°N 72.75°E
- Country: India
- State: Gujarat
- District: Kheda

Population
  - Total: 15,000
- Demonym: Charotar Region Of Gujarat

Languages
  - Official: Gujarati,
- Time zone: UTC+5:30 (IST)
- PIN: 387380
- Telephone code: 0268-2585/86
- Vehicle registration: GJ-7
- Nearest city: Kheda
- Lok Sabha Kheda parliamentary constituency: Matar assembly constituency
- Avg. summer temperature: 44 °C (111 °F)
- Avg. winter temperature: 14 °C (57 °F)

Vaso is a Village located in Kheda district of Gujarat, India. The nearest city is Nadiad and Kheda. Vaso Is taluk of Nadiad in the Kheda district of Gujarat.

== Places of interest ==
Vithalbhai Haveli is a of late 18th century haveli with beautifully carved wooden pillars, frames, beams, ceilings and doors.
