= Mehmedabad Assembly constituency =

Legislative Assembly constituency in Gujarat State, India

Coordinates: 22.6°N 72.56°E

Mehmedabad
- Constituency No. 117 for the Gujarat Legislative Assembly

Constituency details
- Country: India
- Region: Western India
- State: Gujarat
- District: Kheda
- Lok Sabha constituency: Kheda
- Established: 2007
- Total electors: 250,686
- Reservation: None

Member of Legislative Assembly
- 15th Gujarat Legislative Assembly
- Incumbent Arjunsinh Udesinh Chauhan
- Party: Bharatiya Janata Party
- Elected year: 2022

Mehmedabad is one of the 182 Legislative Assembly constituencies of Gujarat state in India. It is part of Kheda district.

== List of segments ==
This assembly seat represents the following segments,

1. Mehmedabad Taluka
2. Kheda Taluka (Part) Villages – Lali, Mahij, Bidaj, Kanera, Sarsa, Vasna Margiya, Sankhej, Vaikunthpura, Pinglaj, Kathwada, Navagam, Malarpura, Samadra, Dedarda, Parsantaj, Vasna-Khurd, Kajipura, Gobhalaj, Pansoli, Chalindra, Dharoda, Chitrasar, Kaloli, Nenpur, Kanij

== Members of Legislative Assembly ==
- 2007 - Sundarsinh Chauhan, Bharatiya Janata Party
- 2012 - Gautambhai Chauhan, Indian National Congress

| Year | Member | Picture | Party |
|---|---|---|---|
| 2017 | Arjunsinh Udesinh Chauhan | | Bharatiya Janata Party |
| 2022 | Arjunsinh Udesinh Chauhan | | Bharatiya Janata Party |

== Election results ==
=== 2022 ===
Gujarat Assembly election, 2022: Mehmedabad Assembly constituency
| Party | Candidate | Votes | % | ±% |
|---|---|---|---|---|
| BJP | Arjunsinh Udesinh Chauhan | 108,541 | 59.54 | |
| INC | Juvansinh Gandabhai Chauhan | 62,937 | 34.52 | |
| AAP | Pramodbhai Somabhai Chauhan | 4,363 | 2.39 | |
| NOTA | None of the above | 3,535 | 1.94 | |
| Majority | | | 25.02 | |
| Turnout | | | | |
| Registered electors | | 246,543 | | |
| BJP hold | | Swing | | |

=== 2017 ===
Gujarat Legislative Assembly Election, 2017: Mehmedabad
| Party | Candidate | Votes | % | ±% |
|---|---|---|---|---|
| BJP | Arjunsinh Chauhan | 88,913 | 51.86 | +9.39 |
| INC | Gautambhai Chauhan | 67,995 | 39.66 | −5.56 |
| Independent | Juvansinh Chauhan | 9,813 | 5.72 | New |
| Majority | | 20,918 | 12.2 | +9.45 |
| Turnout | | 1,71,450 | 75.70 | +0.53 |
| BJP gain from INC | | Swing | | |

=== 2012 ===
Gujarat Assembly Election, 2012
| Party | Candidate | Votes | % | ±% |
|---|---|---|---|---|
| INC | Gautambhai Chauhan | 68,767 | 45.22 | |
| BJP | Sundarsinh Chauhan | 64,586 | 42.47 | |
| Majority | | 4,181 | 2.75 | |
| Turnout | | 152,076 | 75.17 | |
| INC gain from BJP | | Swing | | |

== See also ==
- List of constituencies of Gujarat Legislative Assembly
- Gujarat Legislative Assembly
