= Ghadiya, Gujarat =

Ghadiya Ghadia
- village
- Location in Gujarat
- Coordinates: 23°08′43″N 73°08′24″E
- Country: India
- State: Gujarat
- District: Kheda
- Taluka or Community development block: Kapadvanj Taluka

Population (2011)
  - Total: 2,254
- Time zone: UTC+5:30 (IST)
- PIN: 387620

Ghadiya is a village in the Indian state of Gujarat. It is part of Kapadvanj Taluka of Kheda district. As of the census of 2011, there were 485 households in the village and its population was 2,254.
