= Davda =

- village
- Location in Gujarat
- Coordinates: 22°41′49″N 72°47′41″E
- Country: India
- State: Gujarat
- District: Kheda
- Taluka or Community development block: Nadiad Taluka

Population (2011)
  - Total: 4,005
- Time zone: UTC+5:30 (IST)
- PIN: 387350

Davda is a panchayat village in the Indian state of Gujarat. It is part of Nadiad (rural) Taluka of Kheda district. It is nine kilometers west of the town of Nadiad. Davda has a branch Post Office with a sub-office in nearby Palana.

As of the census of 2011, there were 867 households in the village and its population was 4,005. With a total area of 462.89 hectares (1,143.8 acres), it had, in 2011, 407 hectares (1,010 acres) under cultivation, over 90% of which was irrigated land, through Mahi Kadana Irrigation network. There is significant income from fish culture in the village ponds, including Davda Lake.
