= Haldarvas =

Village in Gujarat state, India

22.81954°N 72.748444°E

Haldarvas is a village in Mehmedavad Taluka in Kheda district of Gujarat state, India.

== History ==
Mavji Pir, a plain building with a Muslim grave put in repair around 1840 by one Bhaiji Muhammad. Halfway between Haldarvas and the village of Barmuara, there is Bamnoli kot, a ruined fort on the right bank of the Vatrak river, said to have been built by Mahmud Begada (1459–1511). On the bank of the river Vatrak, half a mile south-east of the village of Haldarvas, is a temple of Mahadev named after Bhrigu Rishi, measuring twenty feet long and fourteen broad. Across the river is a temple of Parasar Mahadev thirty-six feet by eighteen, repaired about 1810.
