= Arjunsinh Udesinh Chauhan =

Indian politician

- અર્જુનસિંહ ઉદેસિંહ ચૌહાણ

Member of Mehmedabad Assembly constituency for Gujarat Legislative Assembly
- Incumbent
- Assumed office 2022
- Preceded by: Gautambhai Chauhan
- Constituency: Mehmedabad

Minister of Rural Housing and Rural Development of Gujarat
- In office 2021–2022

Personal details
- Born: 22 June 1976 (age 49) Vanthali, Kheda district , Gujarat, India
- Party: BJP
- Parent: Udesinh Chauhan (father)
- Occupation: Politician

Arjunsinh Udesinh Chauhan (born 22 June 1976) is an Indian politician currently serving as a member of the Gujarat Legislative Assembly, representing the Mehmedabad Assembly constituency. He served as the Minister of Rural Housing and Rural Development in the Gujarat government from 2021 to 2022.

From 2017 to 2022, he served as an MLA from the Mehmedabad Assembly constituency as a member of the Bharatiya Janata Party. Following the 2022 Gujarat Legislative Assembly election, he was re-elected as an MLA from the Mehmedabad Assembly constituency.

== Early life ==
He was born on 22 June 1976, in Vanthali, Junagadh district of Gujarat. He completed his B.Com from the Gujarat University in 1998.
