= Ghadiya =

Ghadiya or Ghadia may refer to:

- ghaḍiyā, or ghaṭikā, a Hindu unit of time equal to 24 minutes
- Ghadiya, Gujarat, a village in India

== See also ==
- Abu Ghadiya, an al-Qaeda militant
- Mohamed Ghadia, handball player, member of the Australia men's national handball team for 2020
