= Bajakpura =

Bajakpura (બાજકપુરા) village
- Location within Gujarat Location within India
- Coordinates: 22.75°N 72.68°E
- Country: India
- State: Gujarat
- District: Kheda
- Elevation: 21 m (69 ft)

Population (2011)
  - Total: 999

Languages
  - Official: Gujarati, Hindi, English language
- Time zone: UTC+5:30 (IST)
- Postal code: 387630
- Vehicle registration: GJ 07
- Website: khedanagarpalika.com

Bajakapura is a village in Kathalal Taluka in Kheda district of Gujarat State, India.
