= Mahemadavad Kheda Road railway station =

Railway station in Gujarat, India

Mahemadavad Kheda Road

General information
- Location: Mahemdavad, Kheda; India
- Coordinates: 22°49′09″N 72°45′09″E
- Elevation: 35 metres (115 ft)
- System: Indian Railway Station
- Owner: Ministry of Railways, Indian Railways
- Operator: Western Railway
- Line: Ahmedabad–Mumbai main line
- Platforms: 4
- Tracks: 4

Construction
- Structure type: Standard (On Ground)
- Parking: Yes

Other information
- Status: Functioning
- Station code: MHD
- Zone(s): Western Railway
- Division(s): Vadodara
Location
- Location within India Location within Gujarat

Mahemadavad Kheda Road railway station is a railway station on the Western Railway network in the state of Gujarat, India. This Station Connects to Kheda City and Mahemdavad Town. Mhemadavad Kheda Road railway station is 18 km from Nadiad railway station. Passenger, MEMU, and a few Express/Superfast trains halt at Mahemadavad Kheda Road railway station. This railway station's nearest city is Kheda.

Mahemadavad is well known for Shri Siddhivinayak Devsthan, situated near the bank of the Vatrak River.

== Etymology ==
The railway station's name is Mahemadavad Kheda Road because the railway station is located near Mahemadavad – Kheda Road of Mahemadavad. Mahemadavad - Kheda Road connects Kheda and Mahemadavad.

== Nearby stations ==
Gothaj is the nearest railway station towards Vadodara, whereas Nenpur is the nearest railway station to Ahmedabad.

== Rail ==
The following Express/Superfast trains halt at Mahemadavad Kheda Road railway station in both directions:

- 19033/34 Valsad - Ahmedabad Gujarat Queen Express
- 22959/60 Surat - Jamnagar Intercity Superfast Express
- 19215/16 Mumbai Central - Porbandar Saurashtra Express
- 19035/36 Vadodara - Ahmedabad Intercity Express
- 22953/54 Mumbai Central - Ahmedabad Gujarat Superfast Express
- 19165/66 Ahmedabad - Darbhanga Sabarmati Express
- 19167/68 Ahmedabad - Varanasi Sabarmati Express
- 22927/28 Bandra Terminus - Ahmedabad Lok Shakti Superfast Express
- 12901/02 Mumbai Central - Ahmedabad Gujarat Mail
- 11463/64 Somnath - Jabalpur Express (via Itarsi)
- 11465/66 Somnath - Jabalpur Express (via Bina)
- 19309/10 Gandhinagar Capital - Indore Shanti Express

== See also ==
- Kheda district
