= Balashankar Kantharia =

Gujarati poet and translator

- Born: Balashankar Ullasram Kantharia; 17 May 1858; Nadiad, Gujarat
- Died: 1 April 1898 (aged 39); Vadodara, Gujarat
- Occupations: poet, translator
- Writing career
- Pen name: Kalant Kavi, Bal, Nijanand, Mast
- Language: Gujarati
- Notable work: Hariprem Panchdashi

Balashankar Ullasram Kantharia (17 May 1858 – 1 April 1898) was an Indian Gujarati-language poet from Gujarat, India.

== Biography ==
Balashankar Kantharia was born on May 17, 1858, into a Sathodara Nagar Brahmin family in Nadiad, Bombay Presidency (now in Gujarat, India). He was born to Ullasram Arjunlal Kantharia, a government magistrate, and Revaba, and had one brother, Umedram, and one sister, Rukshmani. Balashankar had studied till the first year of his college. He was a polyglot and knew Gujarati, Persian, Arabic, Sanskrit, Braj and Hindi languages as well as music and archaeology. His wife's name was Manilakshmi.

He briefly worked in government service. He managed Bharati Bhusan, Itihas Mala, Krishna Mahoday magazines. He served as an editor of Buddhiprakash magazine briefly. He is considered as the founder of the modern Gujarati poetry and Ghazal. Manilal Dwivedi was his close friend. He considered himself as a follower of Dalpatram and was expert in poetry in Shikharini metre.

He died due to the plague, on April 1, 1898, at Baroda (now Vadodara, Gujarat).

== Works ==
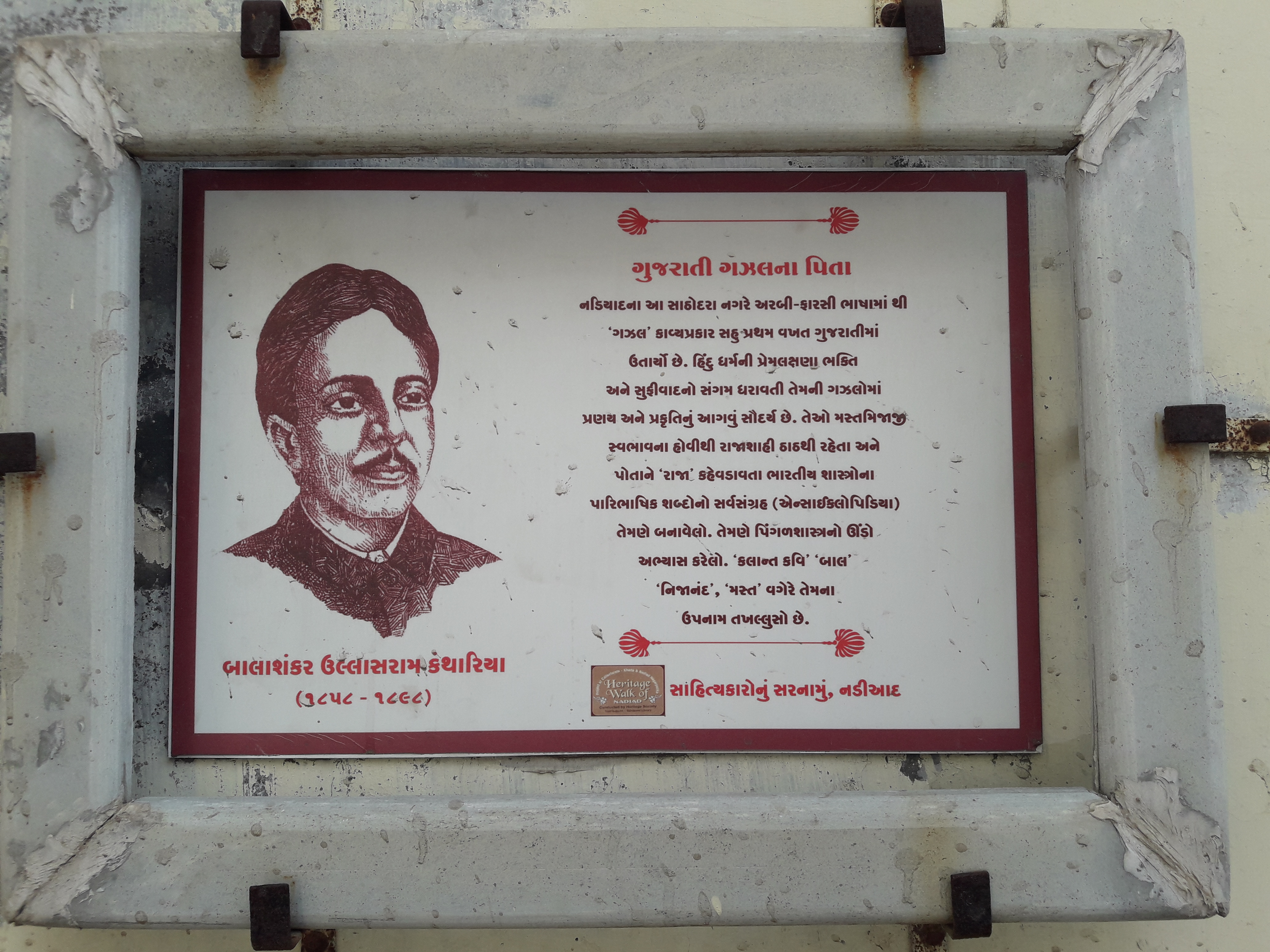
Plaque at Balashankar Kantharia's birth place

Kalant Kavi and Bal were his pen names. He is credited with bringing Persian style poetry such as Ghazal in Gujarati literature. Kalant Kavi and Hariprem Panchdashi are his collections of poetry. He had translated Karpūramañjarī by Rajasekhara, Mṛcchakatika and Sufi Ghazals of Hafez in Gujarati.

"Gujare Je Shire Tare" is his popular ghazal poetry composed in Bah’r Hazaj Saalim metre.
