= Thasra Assembly constituency =

Thasra (Thasra Taluka)

Coordinates: 22.81°N 73.22°E

Thasra
- Constituency No. 119 for the Gujarat Legislative Assembly

Constituency details
- Country: India
- Region: Western India
- State: Gujarat
- Division: Charotar Region Of Gujarat
- District: Kheda
- Lok Sabha constituency: Panchmahal
- Established: 2007
- Total electors: 269,548
- Reservation: None

Member of Legislative Assembly
- 15th Gujarat Legislative Assembly
- Incumbent Yogendrasinh Parmar
- Party: Bharatiya Janata Party
- Elected year: 2022

Thasra is Town and Tehsil Of Kheda district. one of the 182 Legislative Assembly constituencies of Gujarat state in India.

== Thasra ==
Thasra assembly constituency is one of the 182 assembly constituencies in Gujarat state.

It is a General category assembly seat. It is situated in KHEDA district and is one of the 7 assembly segments of PANCHMAHAL Parliament Seat.

SC voters at Thasra assembly is approximately 14,115 which is around 5.53% as per 2011 Census.

ST voters at Thasra assembly is approximately 8,219 which is around 3.22% as per 2011 Census.

MUSLIM voters at Thasra assembly is approximately 14,549 which is around 5.7% as per voter list analysis.

Rural voters at Thasra assembly is approximately 224,315 which is around 87.88% as per 2011 Census.

Urban voters at Thasra assembly is approximately 30,962 which is around 12.13% as per 2011 Census.

Total Voters of Thasra assembly as on 2019 Parliament Election – 255251 .

Number of Polling Booths of Thasra assembly as on 2019 Parliament Election – 308 .

Voters Turnout of Thasra assembly on 2019 Parliament Election – 59.17% .

Voters Turnout of Thasra assembly on 2017 Assembly Election – 70.91% .

== List of segments ==
This assembly seat represents the following segments,

1. Thasra Taluka

== Members of Legislative Assembly ==
- 2007 - Ramsinh Parmar, Indian National Congress
- 2012 - Ramsinh Parmar, Indian National Congress

Year	Member	Picture	Party
2022	Yogendrasinh Parmar (Bakabhai)		Bharatiya Janata Party

== Election results ==
=== 2022 ===
Gujarat Assembly election, 2022: Thasra
Party	Candidate	Votes	%	±%
BJP	Yogendrasinh Parmar (Bakabhai)	121348	61.76	
INC	Parmar Kantibhai Shabhaibhai	59429	30.24	
Independent	Maheshkumar Ramsinh Parmar	5655	2.88	
AAP	Rathod Natvarsinh Punjabhai	3213	1.64	
NOTA	None of the above	2714	1.38	
Majority				
Turnout				
Registered electors		269,548		
BJP gain from INC		Swing		

=== 2017 ===
Gujarat Legislative Assembly Election, 2017: Thasra
Party	Candidate	Votes	%	±%
INC	Kanti Parmar			
NOTA	None of the Above			
Majority				
Turnout				

=== 2012 ===
2012 Gujarat Legislative Assembly election: Thasra
Party	Candidate	Votes	%	±%
INC	Ramsinh Parmar	78,226	47.91	
BJP	Pratikshaben Parmar	72726	44.54	
Majority		5500	3.37	
Turnout		163275	71.85	
INC hold		Swing		

== See also ==
- List of constituencies of the Gujarat Legislative Assembly
- Kheda district
