= Mahisa =

- town
- Location in Gujarat, India Mahisa (India)
- Coordinates: 22°51′0″N 73°3′0″E
- Country: India
- State: Gujarat
- District: Kheda

Population
  - Total: 7,503 1

Languages
  - Official: Gujarati, Hindi
- Time zone: UTC+5:30 (IST)
- Vehicle registration: GJ 7
- Nearest city: Pansora, Dakor, Fagvel.
- Website: gujaratindia.com

Mahisa is a small town of the Kheda district of Gujarat, India. The village is home to several schools, including Sharda Primary School and the M P Joshi High School and Library. Mahisha also has a number of temples dedicated to different deities of Hindu. Shree Atmaram Madhi is located in the middle of Murmsagar Lake with all temples surrounding. Mahisa also has a Kshetragni Devi Temple (for Khetai Maa who is kuldevi of Lord Ved Vyasa). It has also been mentioned also in Devi Bhagvat. Mahisa is blessed by Swaminarayan in his Bharat Yatra in the form of Neelkanthvarni. Mahisa is a village of lakes, including, Marmsagar Lake and Utkantheswar Lake. Mahisa has the world's second Temple of Chaturmukhi Bhrahmaji.

== Temples ==
- Shri Marmsagareshwar Mahadev Temple
- Shri Gayatri Devi Temple
- Shri Kshetragni Mata Temple
- Shri Swaminarayan Temple
- Shree Ramji Temple
- Shree Utkantheswar Mahadev
- Shri Santram Maharaj Temple
- Navdurgha Mata Temple
- Shree Mahakali Temple
- Shree Hanumanji Mandir
- Shree Ganesh Mandir
- Shree Brahmaji Temple
- Baliya Dev Temple
- Gogamaharaj Mandir
- Shree Harshiddi Temple
- Bhathiji Templs

== Connectivity ==
Mahisa is connected through road.Population=200000
