= Gadia, Barabanki =

Village in Uttar Pradesh, India

Gadia
- village
- Location in Uttar Pradesh, India
- Coordinates: 26.55°N 81.08°E
- Country: India
- State: Uttar Pradesh
- District: Barabanki
- Elevation: 111 m (364 ft)

Population (2001)
  - Total: 9,708

Languages
  - Official: Hindi
- Time zone: UTC+5:30 (IST)
- PIN: 225003

Gadia is a gram panchayat in Barabanki district in the Indian state of Uttar Pradesh.

== History ==
Gadia was one of the many talukas in the great Mughal and British Raj-era princely state of Oudh (Awadh).

=== Nawab of Awadh era ===
Salar Ahmad's Shaikh family of Juggaur, fourth in descent from Qazi Kidwa, a son of the Seldjuk Sultans of Rum, acquired the Gadia taluqa in 1843.
