= Sarsa, Kheda =

Coordinates: 22.830°N 72.628°E

Sarsa is a village in the Anand district of the Indian state of Gujarat. It lies approximately 11 kilometres (6.8 mi) east of the district headquarters town of Anand. As of the 2011 Census of India, the village had 477 households with a total population of 43,294 of which 22,176 were male and 21,118 female.
