= Anara, Kheda =

Anara
- Village
- Country: India
- State: Gujarat
- District: Kheda
- Subdistrict: Kathlal

Population (2011)
  - Total: 8,403
- Time zone: UTC+05:30 (IST)
- Pincode: 387630
- Telephone code: 02691
- Vehicle registration: GJ

Anara is a village in Kathlal taluka, Kheda district, Gujarat, India. The population was 8,403 at the 2011 Indian census.
