= Utkanteshwar Mahadev =

Utkantheshwar Mahadev
- Temple
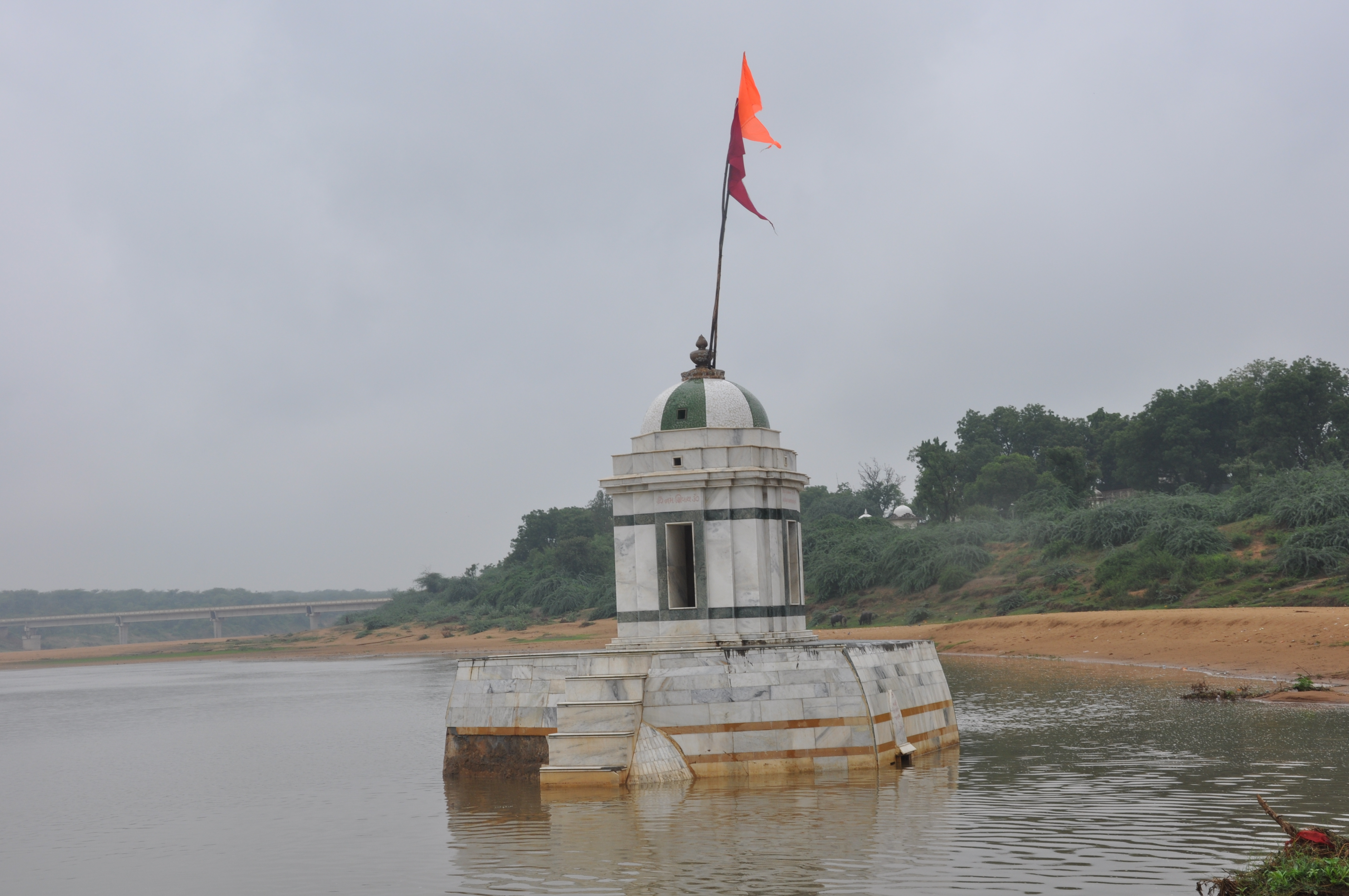

- Location in Gujarat, India Utkantheshwar Mahadev (India)
- Coordinates: 23.01°N 73.03°E
- Country: India
- State: Gujarat
- District: Kheda

Languages
  - Official: Gujarati, Hindi
- Time zone: UTC+5:30 (IST)
- Vehicle registration: GJ 7

Utkantheshwar Mahadev or Utkaṇṭheśvara Mahādeva is a Shiva Temple in the Kapadvanj Taluka, Kheda district of Gujarat, India. and is located on the bank of Vatrak river.

The temple is described by Ali Muhammad Khan in the 18th century Persian text, Mirat-i-Ahmadi.
