= Anara Naeem =

Maldivian parliamentarian

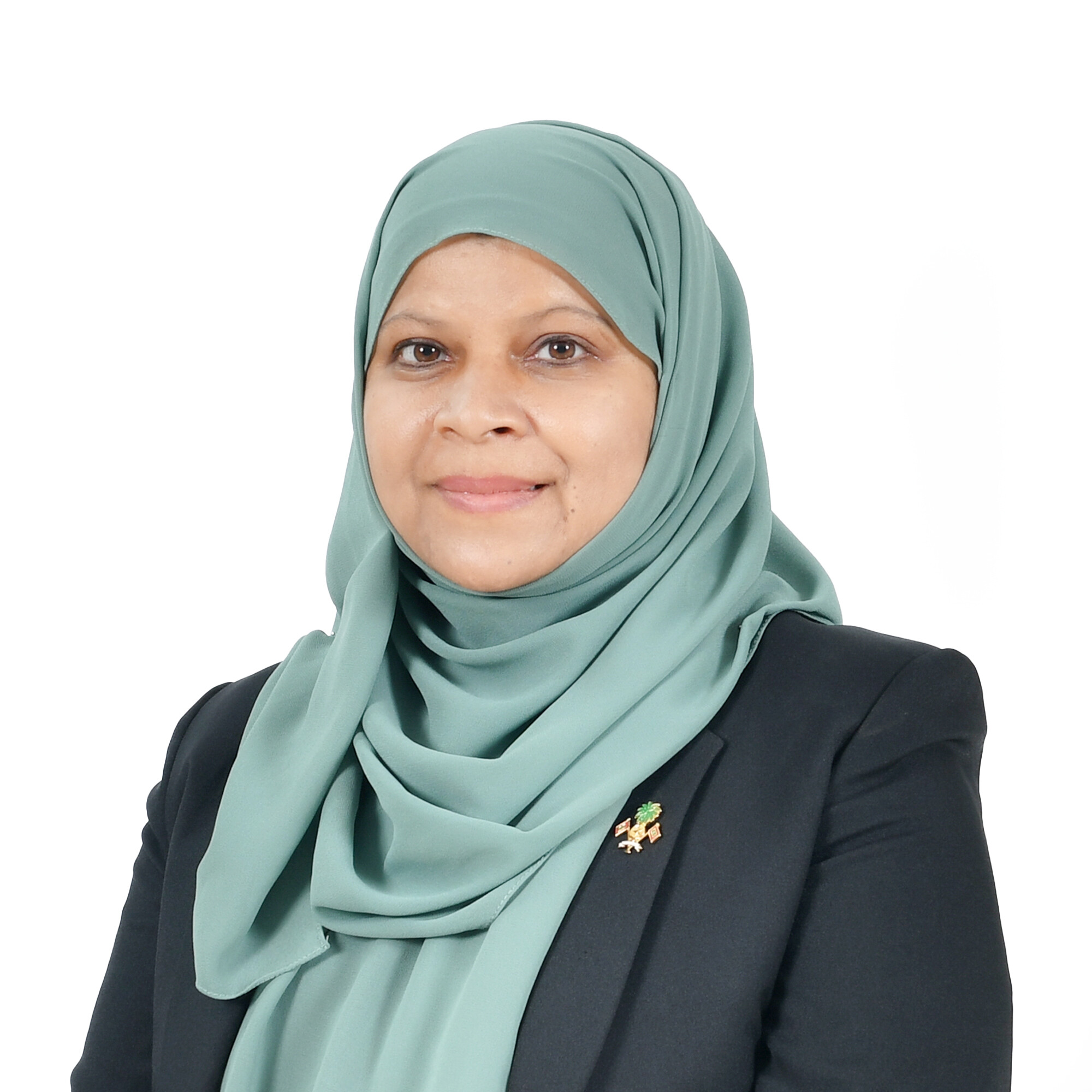
- Official portrait, 2024

Member of the People's Majlis
- Incumbent
- Assumed office 28 May 2024
- Preceded by: Constituency created
- Constituency: Huraa
- In office 2014–2019
- Succeeded by: Mohamed Raee
- Constituency: Makunudhoo

Personal details
- Party: People's National Congress (since 2024)
- Other political affiliations: Adhaalath Party (2014–2021)
- Spouse: Adam Shafeeq
- Education: University of Qatar

Anara Naeem is a Maldivian parliamentarian and an Islamic scholar of Maldives. She is a Member of Parliament for Huraa constituency since 2024.

== Education ==
Naeem has a bachelor's degree in Sharia and Law from University of Qatar.

== Career ==
Anara was previously the Member of parliament for the Makunudhoo constituency and was the only member who won a seat in parliament by her then party, Adhaalath Party in the 2014 Maldivian parliamentary election. She announced her departure from the party in December 2021. After getting defeated in the PNC primary, she ran as Independent for the newly created Huraa constituency in the 2024 Maldivian parliamentary election, where she won along with her husband Adam Shafeeq, who won the Makunudhoo constituency. After winning a seat, she later signed the People's National Congress (PNC).
