= Vatrak River =

Vatrak
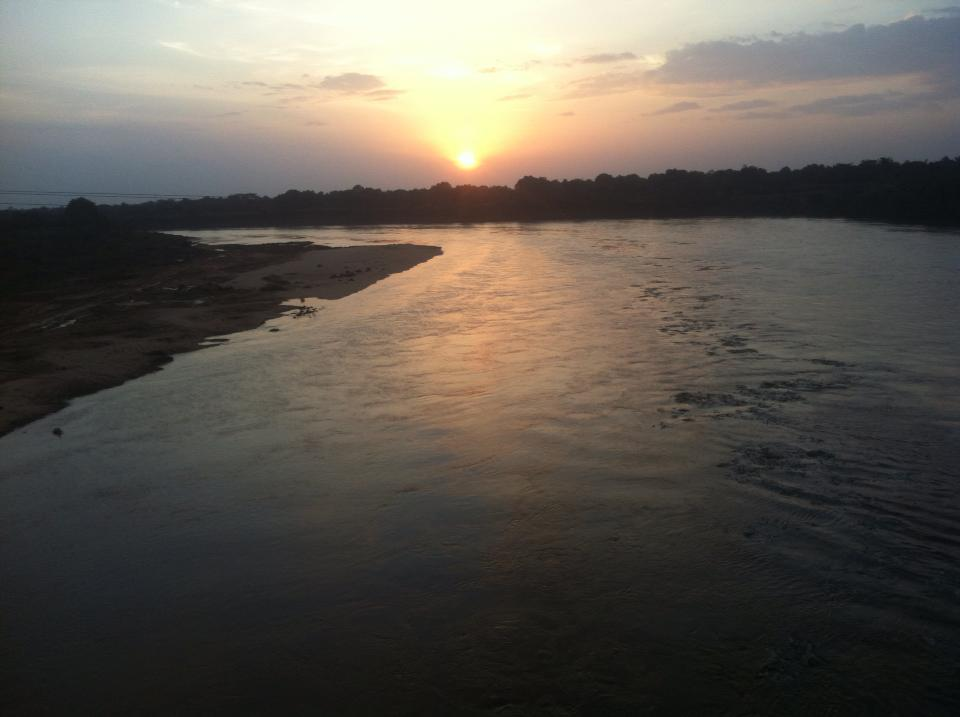

Location
- Country: India
- State: Gujarat, Rajasthan

Physical characteristics
- Mouth
  - coordinates: 22°39′14″N 72°32′34″E
- Length: 243 km (151 mi)

The Vatrak is a tributary of the Sabarmati River which flows for 243 kilometers in Gujarat, India. It originates in the hills of Dungarpur, Rajasthan and enters in Gujarat near village Moydi of Meghraj taluka.

== Basin ==
Vatrak run parallel to the Mahi River, for about 29 km in Rajasthan, before entering the Sabarkantha district near village Moyedi. It runs in the southwest direction of the district, joining Mazum river near the district border with Kheda. Near Untadiya village, Vatrak river meets Zanzari river and the Utkanteshwar Mahadev temple is located on the sangam (lit. 'confluence').

The river joins Shedhi and Meshwo near Kheda and finally drains into Sabarmati at Vautha near Dholka.
