= Yogendrasinh Parmar =

Indian politician

Member of the Gujarat Legislative Assembly since 2022 Yogendrasinh Parmar
- યોગેન્દ્રસિંહ પરમાર

Member of Thasra Assembly constituency for Gujarat Legislative Assembly
- Incumbent
- Assumed office 2022
- Preceded by: Kantibhai Parmar
- Constituency: Thasra

Personal details
- Born: 4 April 1972 (age 54)
- Party: BJP
- Occupation: Politician
- Nickname: Bakabhai

Yogendrasinh Parmar (born 4 April 1972) is an Indian politician who represented Thasra Assembly constituency in the Gujarat Legislative Assembly. In 2022, he was elected as MLA from Thasra Assembly constituency as a member of the Bhartiya Janta Party.
