= Nadiad =

Nadiad Natpur Natdra
- City
- Nickname: Sakshar Nagari
- Location within Gujarat Location within India Location within Asia
- Coordinates: 22.69°N 72.86°E
- Country: India
- State: Gujarat
- District: Kheda

Government
  - Type: Municipal Corporation
  - Body: Nadiad Municipal Corporation
  - Mayor: Manish Patel
  - Deputy Mayor: Kalpesh Raval
  - Municipal Commissioner: IAS Kiran B. Jhaveri (2026)
  - Deputy Municipal Commissioners: Vimalkumar K. Gadhvi(Admin)West Zone, Rudresh Hudad(Projects)East Zone(2026)

Area
  - City: 78.55 km^{2} (30.33 sq mi)
  - Rank: 8th in Gujarat
- Elevation: 35 m (115 ft)

Population (2011)
  - City: 330,000 (2,025)
  - Rank: 14th in Gujarat
  - Density: 6,170.94/km^{2} (15,982.7/sq mi)
  - Metro: 408,000 (2,025)
- Demonym(s): Nadiadi, Charotari

Languages
  - Official: Gujarati, Hindi, English
- Time zone: UTC+5:30 (IST)
- PIN: 387 001, 387 002, 387 370, 387 355, 387 230, 387 320
- Telephone code: 0268
- Vehicle registration: GJ-07
- Website: nadiadnmc.in

Nadiad is a city in the state of Gujarat, India and the administrative centre of the Kheda district. It is known for the Santram Mandir, the Mai Mandir; It is the birthplace of Sardar Vallabhbhai Patel, the first Deputy Prime Minister of India.

== Climate ==
Nadiad usually has mild winters and very hot summers, with an average of from 32 °C (90 °F) to 46 °C (115 °F), and an average rainfall from 70 centimetres (28 in) to 120 centimetres (47 in).

== Attractions ==
Santram Mandir is located in the center of the town. It is known for its charity work. This old temple is visited by people on the day of full moon. Marida Darwaja and Amdavadi Darwaja are also nearby.

Shri Atmasiddhishastra Rachnabhoomi is a memorial that stands at the site of the creation of Atmasiddhi Shastra composed by Shrimad Rajchandra, a saint, poet and philosopher in 1895.

== Transport ==
Nadiad is well connected with railway and road transport links. Nadiad Junction railway station is a major railway station in Kheda District and Indian Railways's "A" Category Railway Station Located on the Ahmedabad-Mumbai main line. Nadiad has two extra lines. One goes to Modasa and other one goes to Petlad. Nadiad Junction railway station has four platforms. Indian Railway is going to extend the Modasa Line to Shamlaji. Nadiad has a major bus stand. Nadiad is a zonal division in the Charotar region, which has depots in Kheda, Anand, Mahemdavad, Kapadvanj, Dakor, Mahudha, Borsad, and Khambhat. Nadiad is well connected to Ahmedabad, Vadodara, Gandhinagar, Surat, and Rajkot by bus. The nearest airport is Sardar Vallabhbhai Patel International Airport located in Ahmedabad (65 km from Nadiad). A bullet train station, part of the Mumbai–Ahmedabad high-speed rail corridor, is also under construction in the southern part of the city.

== Demography ==
Religions in Nadiad City (2011)
Religion	Percent
Hinduism	79.66%
Islam	13.51%
Jainism	3.62%
Christianity	0.85%
Sikhism	0.22%

As per provisional reports of Census India, population of Nadiad in 2011 is 218,095; of which male and female are 112,311 and 105,784 respectively. Although Nadiad city has a population of 218,095; its urban / metropolitan population is 225,071 of which 115,903 are males and 109,168 are females.

== Notable people ==
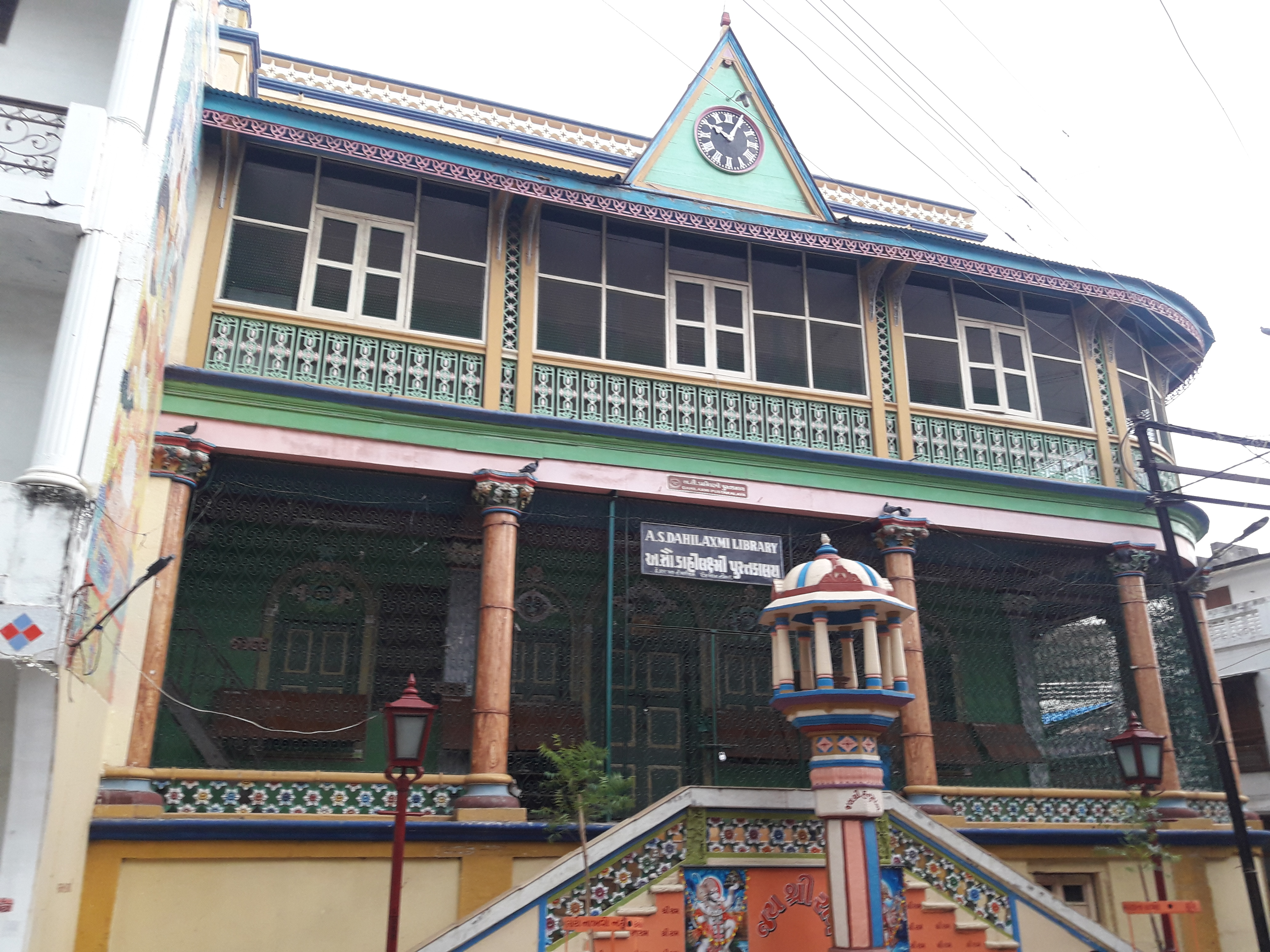
Dahilaxmi Library, Nadiad (Gujarat), founded by Mansukhram Suryaram Tripathi

- Mansukhram Tripathi (1840 – 1907), writer
- Govardhanram Tripathi (1855 – 1907), novelist, author of the epic Gujarati novel Saraswatichandra
- Balashankar Kantharia (1858 – 1898), poet
- Manilal Dwivedi (1858 – 1898), writer
- Vallabhbhai Patel (1875 – 1950), politician
- Indulal Yagnik (1892 – 1972), writer, led Mahagujarat movement demanding separate statehood to Gujarat
- Verghese Kurien (1921-2012), Indian dairy engineer and social entrepreneur also known as "Father of the White Revolution" in India died here.
- Bakul Tripathi (1928 – 2006), humorist
- Dinsha Patel (born 1937), politician
- Amar Gupta (born 1953), computer scientist
- Praful Patel (born 1957), politician and businessman
- Axar Patel (born 1994), cricketer
- Babubhai Patel, politician
- Vishvesh Parmar, Bollywood singer, recording artist, music composer
- Mohsin Khan, actor

== Education ==
Educational institutes located in Nadiad include:

- New English School(Gujarati Medium) and English Teaching School(English Medium)
- C. B. Patel Arts College
- Uni Trust Surajba Mahila Arts College
- Nadiad Ayurveda College
- J & J College of Science
- Dinsha Patel College of Nursing
- Dr.N.D.Desai Faculty Of Medical Science And Research
- t.j patel commerce college
