= Dakor =

- city
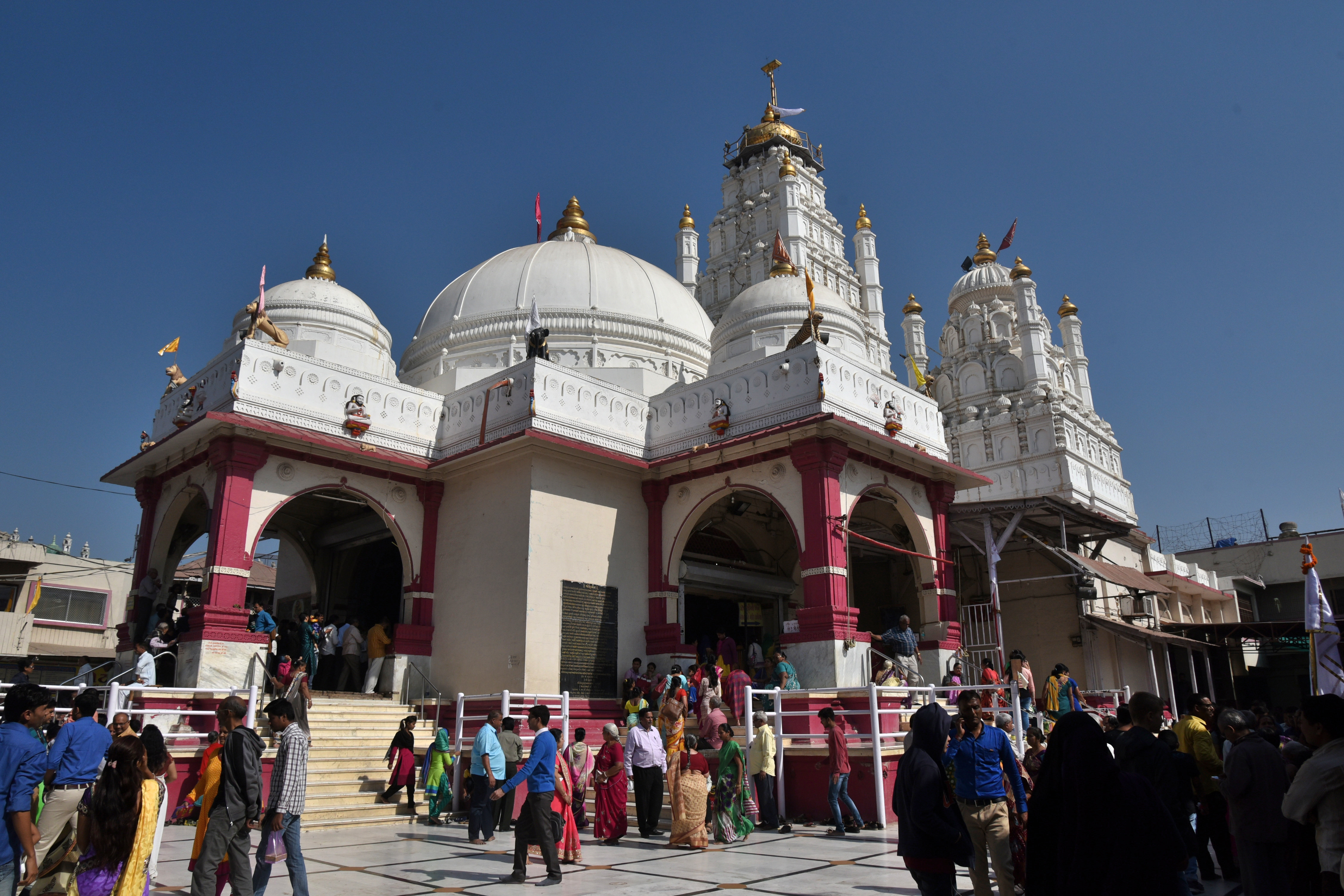
- Raṇchoḍrāyjī Temple, Dakor
- Interactive map of Dakor
- Coordinates: 22.75°N 73.15°E
- Country: India
- State: Gujarat
- District: Kheda
- Elevation: 49 m (161 ft)

Population (2001)
  - Total: 23,784

Languages
  - Official: Gujarati
- Time zone: UTC+5:30 (IST)
- Website: kheda.nic.in/public-utility/dakor-municipality/ www.ranchhodraiji.org

Dakor (Gujarati: ISO 15919: Ḍākōra) is a small city and a municipality in Kheda district in the state of Gujarat, India. It is prominent for its temple of Raṇchoḍrāyjī.

== Religion ==
The oldest temple in town is that of Śiva Ḍaṁkanātha, who is served by Tapodhan Brahmins. According to the Ḍākor-māhātmya, Dvārakādhīśa aka Raṇachoḍarāya, the murti of the Dwarkadhish Temple in Dwarka, Gujarat, came back with his aged devotee Boḍāṇo to Ḍākor in his home in 1151. The rituals remained simple until 1625, when the Puṣṭimārgīya gosvāmī Harirāya initiated Vallabhite rites for the idol and appointed Kheḍāvāḷ and Śrīgauḍ-Mevāḍ Brahmins to the murti's service. Raṇachoḍarāya was first installed in a formal temple in the early 18th century, and was then moved into the current temple built by Gopāl Tāṁbvekar in 1769-70.

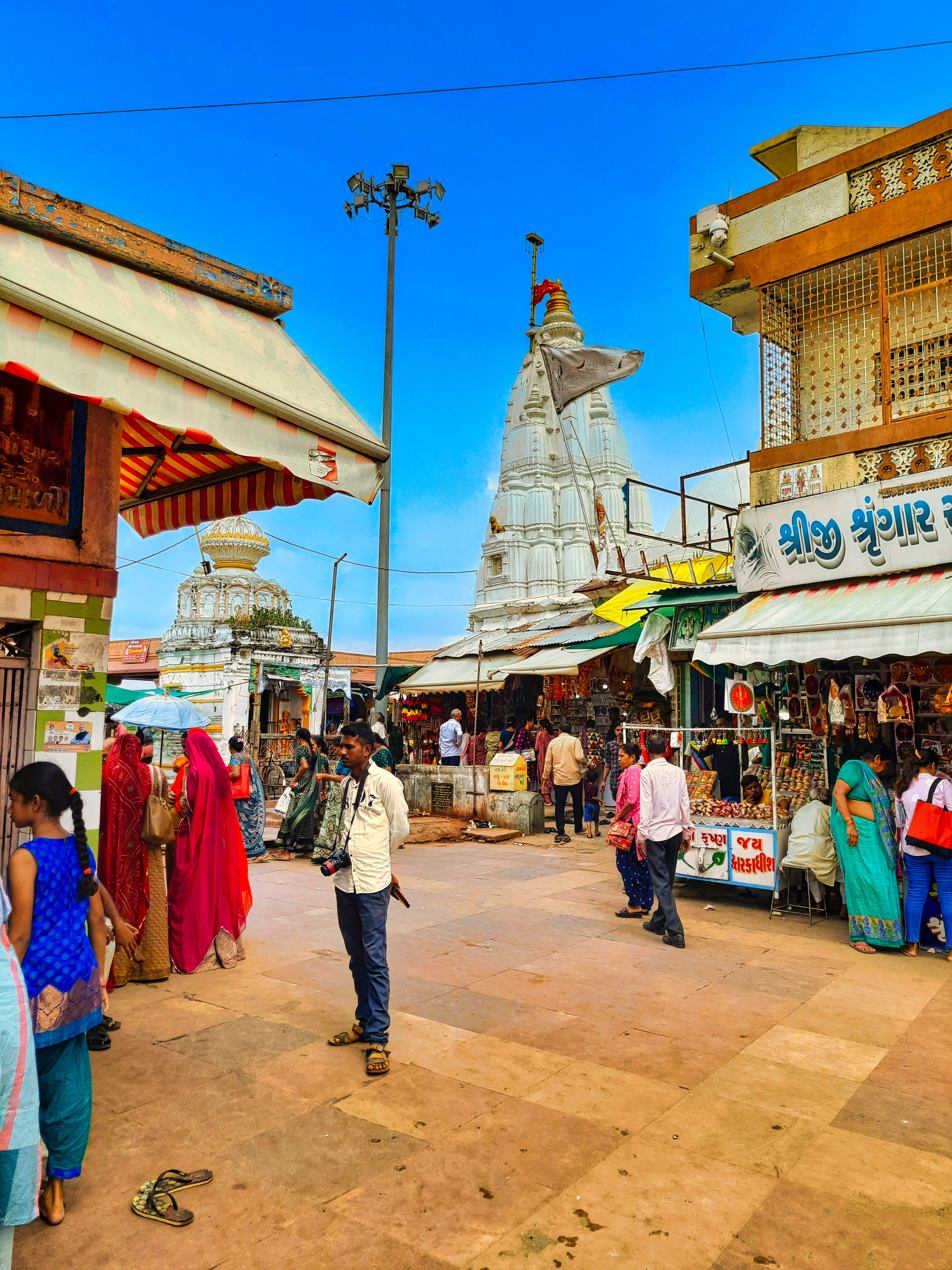
Ḍaṅkanātha temple (center)

== Demographics ==
As of 2001 India census, Dakor had a population of 23,784. Males constitute 53% of the population and females 47%. Dakor has an average literacy rate of 76%, higher than the national average of 59.5%: male literacy is 82% and, female literacy is 69%. In Dakor, 10% of the population is under 6 years of age.

== Sources ==
- Majamudāra, Maṁjulāla Ra. (1984). Vaiṣṇavatīrtha Ḍākora. Śrī Sayājī Sāhityamāḷā, puṣpa 362 (in Gujarati). Vaḍodarā: Prācyavidyā Mandira, Mahārāja Sayājīrāva Viśvavidyālaya.
- Majmudar, M.R. (1947). "Dwārkā Image of Raṇchhoḍjī and the temple at Ḍākore". Journal of the University of Bombay. 16.
- Majmudar, M.R. (1960). Cultural History of Gujarat (From Early Times to Pre-British Period). Popular Prakashan.
- Mallison, Françoise (1983). "Development of early Krishnaism in Gujarāt: Viṣṇu – Raṇchoḍ – Kr̥ṣṇa". In Thiel-Horstmann, Monika (ed.). Bhakti in current research, 1979-1982 : proceedings of the Second International Conference on Early Devotional Literature in New Indo-Aryan Languages, St. Augustin, 19-21 March 1982. Collectanea Instituti Anthropos. Vol. 30. Berlin: Dietrich Reimer Verlag.
