= Kheda district =

Kheda district Kaira district Charotar Region
- District of Gujarat
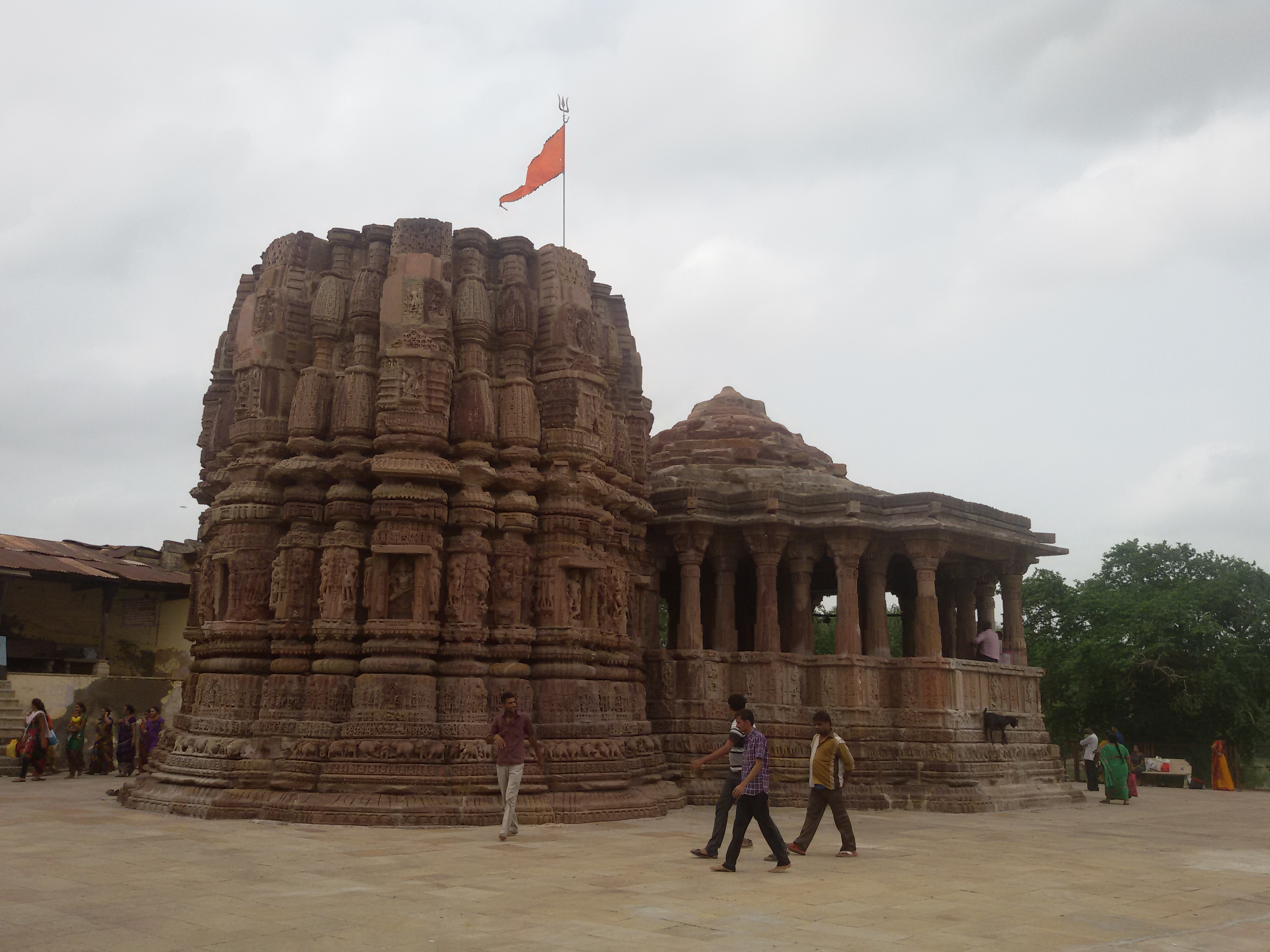
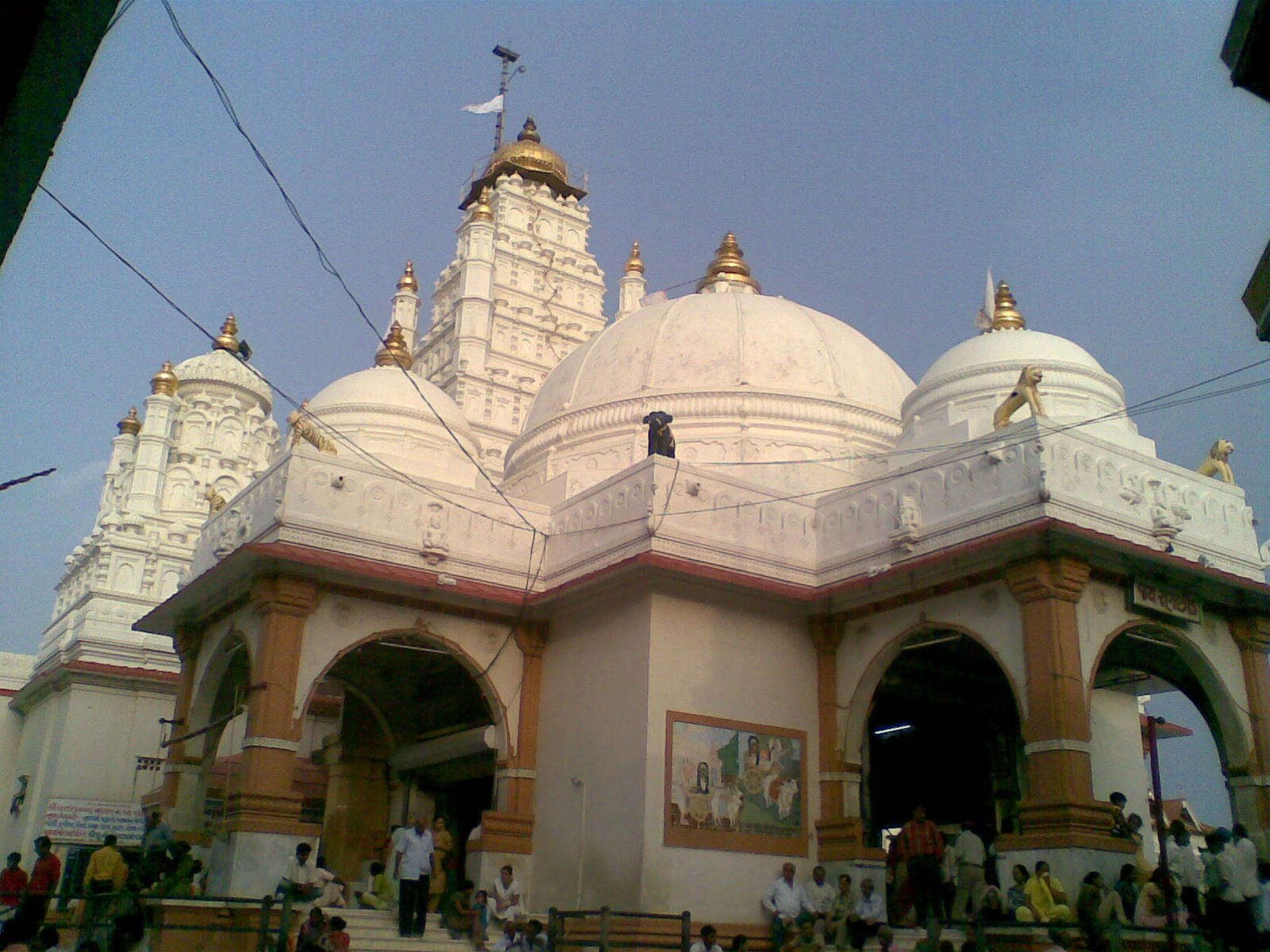
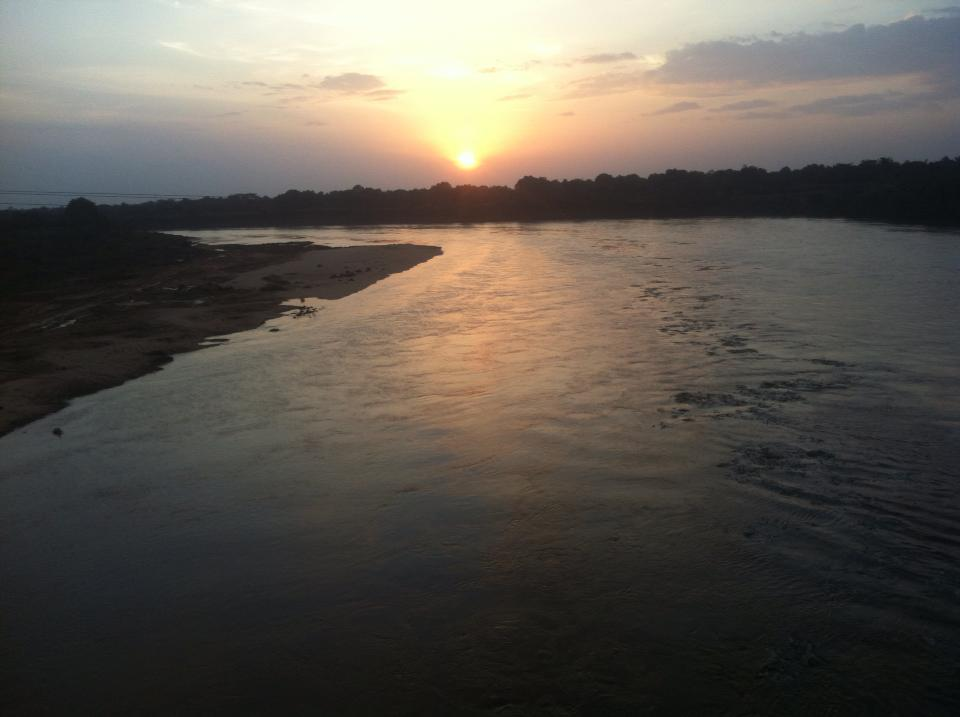
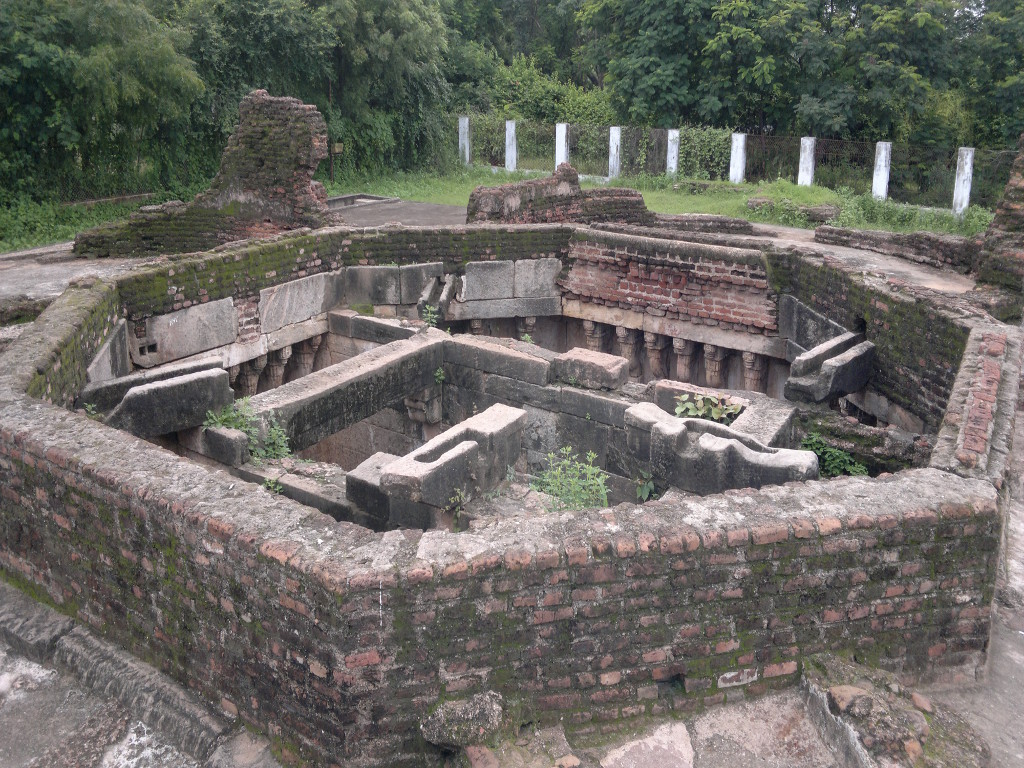
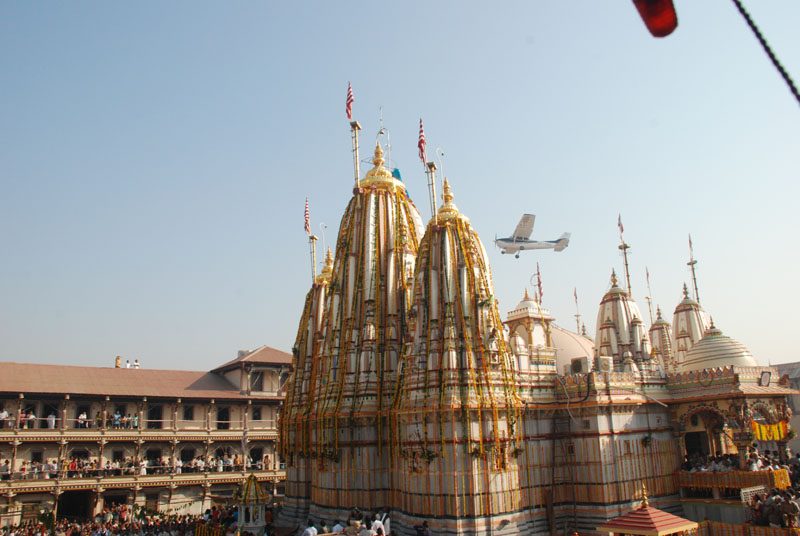
- Clockwise from top-left: Galteshwar Mahadev Temple, Ranchhodji Temple, Dakor, Bhamaria well, Mahemdavad, Swaminarayan Temple, Vadtal, Vatrak River at Kheda

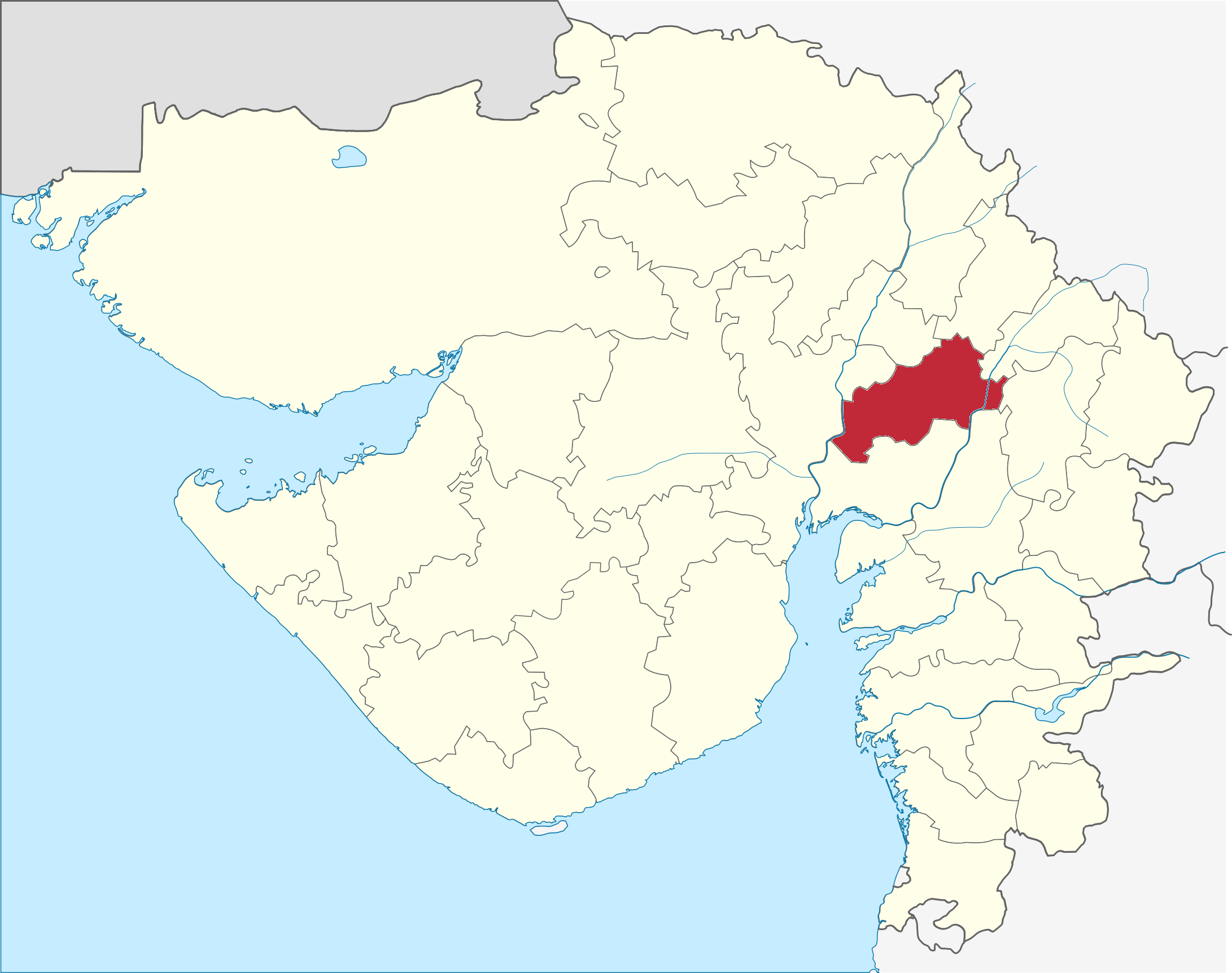
- Location of district in Gujarat
- Interactive map of Kheda district
- Coordinates: 22°45′N 72°41′E
- Country: India
- State: Gujarat
- Headquarters: Nadiad
- Tehsils: 1. Kheda; 2. Nadiad; 3. Matar, Kheda; 4. Kapadvanj; 5. Mahemdabad; 6. Vaso; 7. Mahudha; 8. Kathalal; 9. Thasra; 10. Galteshwar

Government
  - Body: Kheda District Seva Sadan
  - Member Of Parliament: Devusinh Jesingbhai Chauhan (Bharatiya Janata Party)
  - Collector: Shri Amit Prakash Yadav (IAS)

Area
  - Total: 3,667 km^{2} (1,416 sq mi)

Population (2011)
  - Total: 2,299,885
  - Density: 627.2/km^{2} (1,624/sq mi)
- Demonym: Charotar Region

Languages
  - Official: Gujarati
- Time zone: UTC+5:30 (IST)
- Postal code: 387411
- Vehicle registration: GJ-07
- Website: kheda.nic.in

Kheda district, known as Kaira district during British rule, is one of the thirty-three districts of Gujarat state in western India. It is part of the region known as Charotar, consisting of Kheda and Anand districts. Kheda was an administrative capital during British rule. Nadiad is now the administrative headquarters of the district.

== History ==
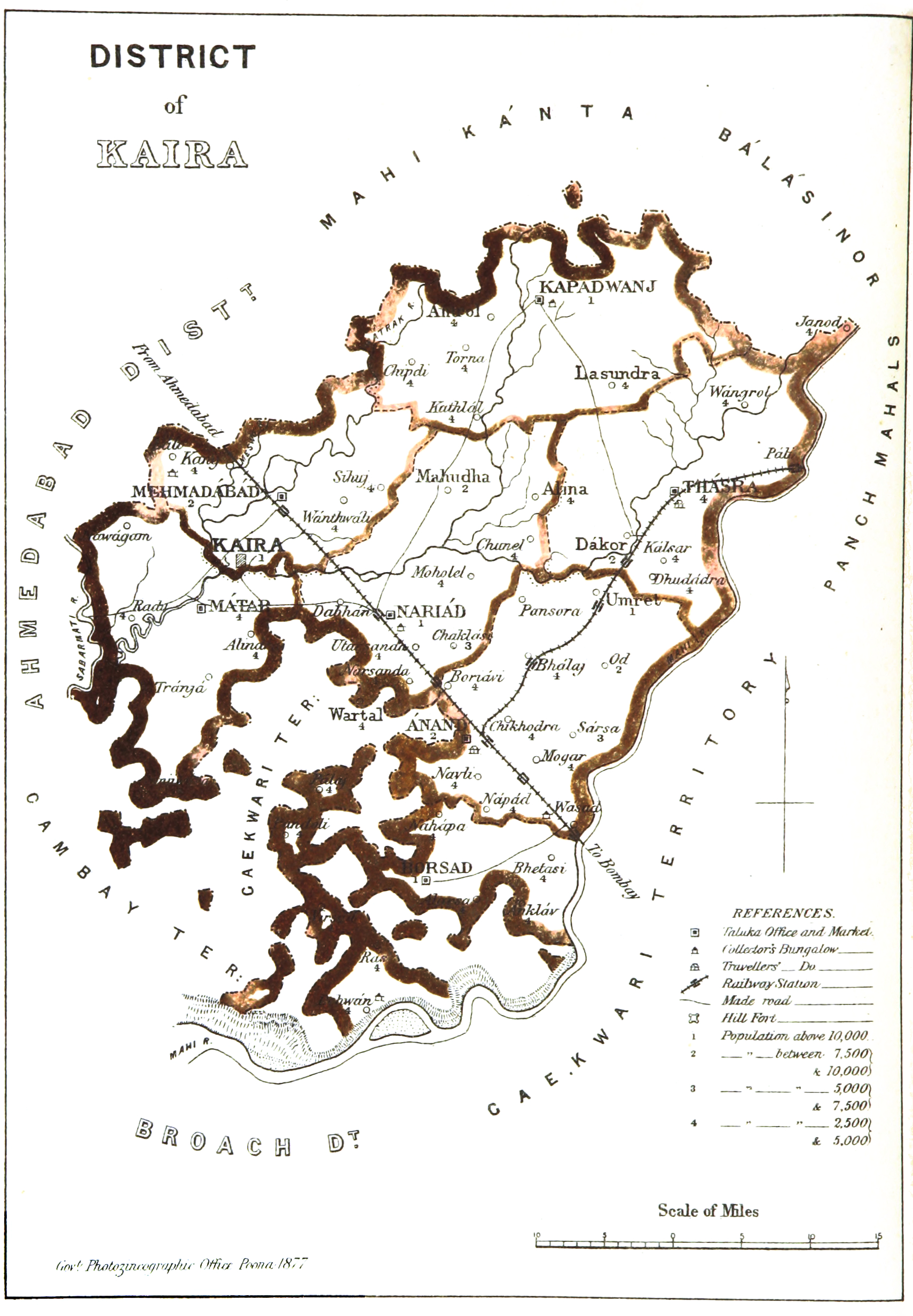
Kaira district (1855)

Formerly known as Kaira district, it was divided in two with the southern part becoming Anand district in 1997. The Charotar region of Kaira consisted of four talukas (sub-districts): Nadiad, Anand, Borsad, and Petlad. When the district was divided, Nadiad Taluka went with Kheda district and the other three with Anand district. Today, Kheda has eleven talukas. Balasinor and Virpur, once in Kheda district, were moved to the newly formed Mahisagar district in 2013.

During the Indian independence movement in the first half of the 20th century, the Patidars of the Charotar region and other areas in Kaira resisted the British in a number of standoffs, notably the Kaira anti-tax campaign of 1913, the Kheda Satyagraha of 1918, the Borsad Satyagraha of 1923, and the Bardoli Satyagraha of 1928.

== Demographics ==
Historical population
Year	Pop.	±% p.a.
1901	524,392	—
1911	514,019	−0.20%
1921	522,318	+0.16%
1931	568,276	+0.85%
1941	676,215	+1.75%
1951	816,050	+1.90%
1961	1,018,911	+2.24%
1971	1,277,630	+2.29%
1981	1,566,361	+2.06%
1991	1,798,282	+1.39%
2001	2,037,894	+1.26%
2011	2,299,885	+1.22%

According to the 2011 census Kheda district has a population of 2,299,885, roughly equal to the nation of Latvia or the US state of New Mexico. This gives it a ranking of 197th in India (out of a total of 640). The district has a population density of 541 inhabitants per square kilometre (1,400/sq mi) . Its population growth rate over the decade 2001-2011 was 12.81%. Kheda has a sex ratio of 937 females for every 1000 males, and a literacy rate of 84.31%.

The divided district had a population of 2,053,769, of which 474,041 (23.08%) lived in urban areas. The divided district had a sex ratio of 940 females per 1000 males. Scheduled Castes and Scheduled Tribes made up 98,686 (4.81%) and 37,310 (1.82%) of the population respectively.

Religions in Kheda district (2011)
Religion	Percent
Hinduism	86.71%
Islam	11.65%
Christianity	1.28%
Other or not stated	0.36%

Hindus are 1,780,801, while Muslims are 239,214 and Christians are 26,387.

=== Language ===
Languages of Kheda district (2011)
1. Gujarati (97.3%)
2. Hindi (1.88%)
3. Sindhi (0.24%)
4. Marathi (0.15%)
5. Urdu (0.10%)
6. Marwari (0.09%)
7. Others (0.19%)

At the time of the 2011 census, 97.35% of the population spoke Gujarati and 2.01% Hindi as their first language.

== Administrative divisions ==
Since 2013, Kheda district has been divided into eleven taluka.

1. Nadiad City (Urban) headquarters in the Municipal corporation of Nadiad.
2. Kheda Headquarter in the Municipality Of Kheda, Villages include Dedarda, Vavdi
3. Thasra(Dakor) -villages include Kalsar
4. Kapadvanj - villages include Abvel, Antroli, Ghadiya, Telnar.
5. Mehmedabad (Mahemdavad), headquartered in the town of Mahemdavad, villages include Haldarvas, Kanij, Sarsavani
6. Kathlal, villages include Anara, Bajakapura, Pithai
7. Matar, headquartered in Matar village, villages include Asamali
8. Mahudha, headquartered in the municipality of Mahisa, Mahudha, villages include Heranj
9. Nadiad (Rural), villages include Davda
10. Galteshwar (271.28 km^{2} [104.74 sq mi]), villages include Anghadi, Kuni, Pali
11. Vaso, headquartered in Vaso, villages include Palana, Rampur, Gangapur.

== Politics ==
District	No.	Constituency	Name	Party	Remarks
Kheda	115	Matar	Kalpesh Parmar		
Kheda	116	Nadiad	Pankajbhai Desai		
Kheda	117	Mehmedabad	Arjunsinh Chauhan		
Kheda	118	Mahudha	Sanjaysinh Mahida		
Kheda	119	Thasra	Yogendrasinh Parmar		
Kheda	120	Kapadvanj	Rajeshkumar Zala		

== Notable people of Kheda District ==
- Urjit Patel - Reserve Bank of India's ex governor belongs to Kheda
- Govardhanram Tripathi (1855–1907) Writer; born in Nadiad.
- Manilal Nabhubhai (1858–1898) Writer and philosopher; born in Nadiad.
- Narendra M. Patel (1920s-2012) Speaker of the Ugandan Parliament
- Ravji Patel (1939–1968) Modernist poet and novelist; born in Vallavpura village.
- Sardar Vallabhbhai Patel (1875 – 1950) Indian freedom fighter and first Home minister of India; born in Nadiad
- Indulal Yagnik (1892–1972) Indian independence activist, leader of the All India Kisan Sabha, and the most influential leader of the Mahagujarat movement
- Axar Patel Indian Cricketer.
- Ravishankar Vyas (1984–1994) also known as 'Maharaj'. Indian Freedom Fighter; born in Radhu Village Near Kheda

== See also ==
- Koli rebellions
- Kheda Satyagraha of 1918
- White revolution (India)
