= Kapadvanj =

Kapadvanj Charotar Region Of Gujarat Karpat – Vanjiyam
- Town
- Location in Gujarat, India Kapadvanj (India)
- Coordinates: 23.02°N 73.07°E
- Country: India
- State: Gujarat
- District: Kheda

Government
  - Type: Municipality
  - Body: Kapadvanj Nagarpalika

Area
  - Total: 19 km^{2} (7.3 sq mi)
- Elevation: 69 m (226 ft)

Population (2011)
  - Total: 49,308
  - Density: 2,600/km^{2} (6,700/sq mi)
- Demonym: Charotar Region Of Gujarat

Languages
  - Official: Gujarati, Hindi, English
- Time zone: UTC+5:30 (IST)
- PIN: 387620
- Vehicle registration: GJ 07
- Website: kapadvanj.in

Kapadvanj (Karpat – Vanjiyam or "The Land of Textile") is a town as well as one of the Taluka of the Kheda district in the Gujarat, India. It is located on bank of river Mohar. It is 65 km away from Ahmedabad and 93 km away from Vadodara.

== Geography ==
GSRTC bus station

Kapadvanj is located at 23.02°N 73.07°E. It has an average elevation of 69 metres (226 feet).

=== Climate ===
Kapadvanj usually experiences a semi-arid climate. The temperatures shoot up to 45-47 degree Celsius especially in the month of May. Hot winds blow over the region known as"Loo". Rainy season starts from July and ends in September. Rainfall is between 750-800mm. In winters temperature fall to 8-9 degree Celsius. Mild climate causes pleasant weather during the season

== History, historical places ==
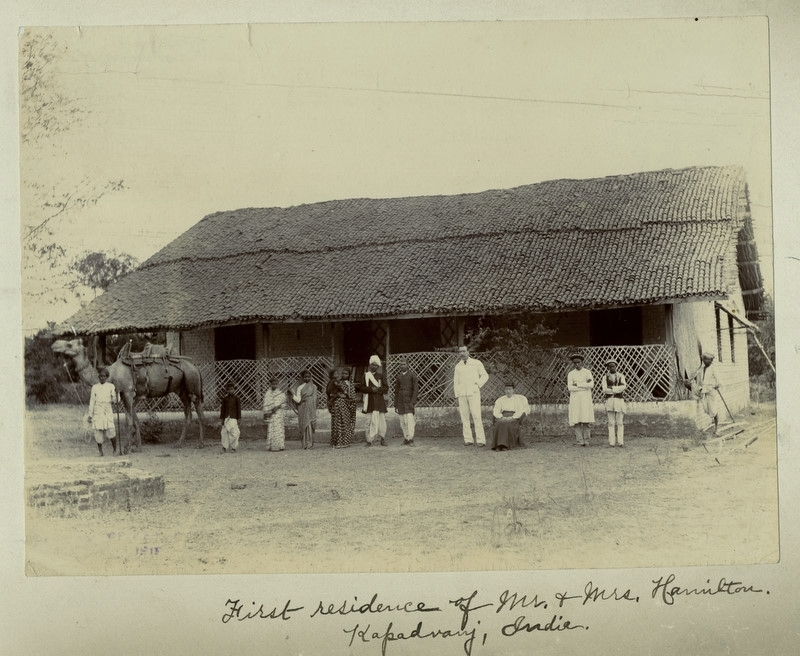
First residence of Mr. and Mrs. Hamilton Kapadvanj in Gujarat in the 1890s

Jayasimha Siddharaja (1094 – 1143), chalukya king, built some of Gujarat's finest architectural structures. He had built two exquisite Vavs (step wells) and a Torana at the centre of the old town. The main structure called kundvav is a rectangular structure, similar to plan of Modhera Sun Temple step well. However, it is smaller and simpler than Modhera's.

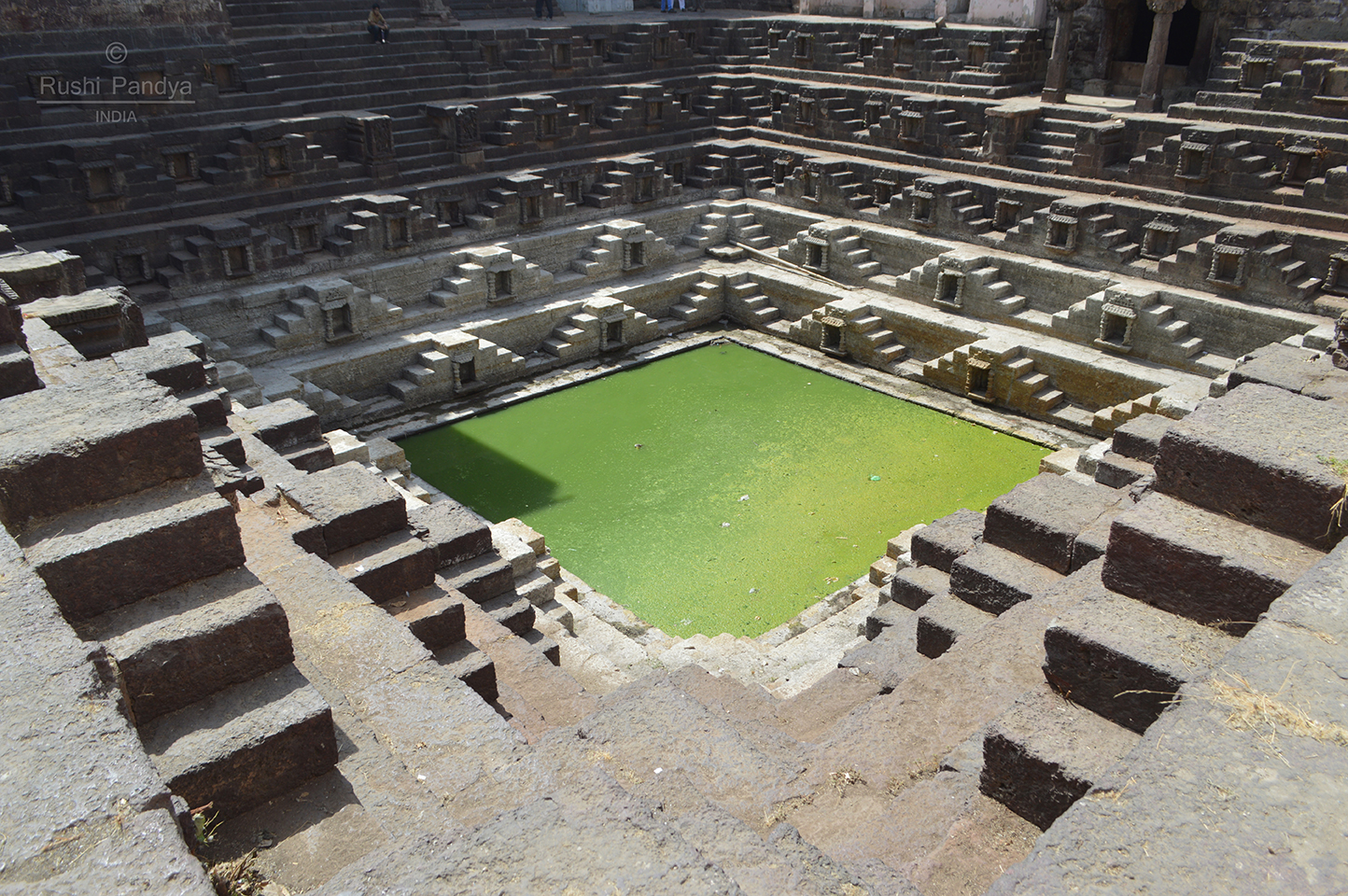
Kundvav Kapadvanj

Kapadvanj was a major trading centre on the route inland from the port of Cambay and trade brought it wealth and importance in the time Siddharaj Jayasinh Solanki. As it was located close to Mohar River, it was a perfect place for constructing step wells for water supply. According to local historians and elderly folks the town had five gates. The torana at Kapadvanj is one among the 13 kirtistambhas in Gujarat; however it is amongst the best preserved, only after the Vadnagar torana. It has two pillars and a transverse architrave. The entire torana is covered with elaborate sculptures.

Other historical place of Kapadvanj is Vohrawad (a Bohra neighbourhood marked by the special character of the elegantly hybrid architecture). There are few wooden havelis there. They wore even sculptures of musicians, a usual feature of pol wooden houses in Ahmedabad.

There are nine Jain Temples in Kapadvanj. Chintamani Parshwanath Temple, Astapad Temple, Glass temple of Shantinath are famous of them.

Feroze Tuglaq Mosque in Kapadvanj has a unique calligraphy originated in Gujarat called Khat-e-Bahaar which blends local elements in Arabic script.

=== Battles and historical events ===
In 1451, the Mahmud Khalji of the Malwa and Ahmad Shah of Gujarat fought the battle of Kapadvanj which resulted Gujarati victory over the invading Malwa army.

In 1746, a battle was fought at Kapadvanj in which SherKhan was wounded. He was then forced to take shelter with Rangoji in Kapadvanj, while Fakhr-ud-daulah, Gangadhar and Krishnaji laid siege to that town. At this time Malhar Rao Holkar, on his way back from his yearly raid into Malwa, was asked by the Lunawara Chief to join him in attacking Virpur. Holkar agreed, and Virpur was plundered. Rangoji, hearing of the arrival of Holkar, begged him to come to his aid, and on the promise of receiving a sum of 20,000/ (Rs. 2,00,000) and two elephants, Holkar consented. And Fakhr-ud-daulah, hearing of the approach of Holkar, raised the siege of Kapadvanj, and marching to Dholka.

== Demographics ==
When Gujarat separated from Mumbai, the government created 10 dist and 40 taluka, Kapadvanj was one of them. Kapadvanj was a Lok Sabha parliamentary constituency in Gujarat. Shankarsinh Vaghela was last MP from Kapadvanj.

== Education ==
Kapadvanj has many educational institutions like C. N. Vidhyalaya, Maneklal Desai Kishor Mandir, Shree L M Sharda Mandir School, Adarsh School, M P High School, Shree Ganesh English Medium School, School for success (jeevanshilp campus), V.M Parekh and K.S. Shah Arts and commerce college, Smt. Santaben Kanchanlal Shah (Chawada) College of Education (B. ed. college). Kapadwanj Kelavani Mandal (KKM Trust) is the oldest and pioneer non-profit entity in the town providing education since 1940.

== Politics ==
Politics of Kapadvanj city has always been closely contested between Indian National Congress and Bharatiya Janta Party. Other national parties with limited activities are Bahujan Samaj Party, Nationalist Congress Party. Other state parties active in Kapadvanj is Mahagujarat Janta Party, Samata Party, Republic Party of India. Kapadvanj has 280,899 registered voters including 143,664 Male and 137,223 Female.

Kapadvanj has one state assembly constituencies. INC has always been a strong party in this arena. BJP won this seat in 2022 election. Total number of voters participated were 19 295,584. BJP got 53.97% of votes and nearest competitor was INC with 38.62%. Election for the state assembly is held every 5 years. The current MLA of Kapadvanj assembly is Rajeshkumar Maganbhai Zala.

== See also ==
- Utkanteshwar Mahadev
- Galteshwar Temple
