= Kheda =

City in Gujarat, India

Kheda Kaira
- City
- Charotar Region
- Nickname: City of Golden Leaf
- Location within Gujarat Location within India
- Coordinates: 22.75°N 72.68°E
- Country: India
- State: Gujarat
- District: Kheda
- Elevation: 21 m (69 ft)

Population (2011)
  - Total: 102,587

Languages
  - Official: Gujarati, Hindi, English
- Time zone: UTC+5:30 (IST)
- Postal code: 387411
- Vehicle registration: GJ-07
- Website: khedanagarpalika.com

Kheda (Gujarati: Kheḍā; Gujarati pronunciation: [ˈkʰeɖa]) is a city and a municipality in the Indian state of Gujarat. Kheda was known as Kaira during the British Raj. It was the former administrative capital of Kheda district. The city is known for tobacco farming. The nearest railway station is Mahemadavad Kheda Road and the nearest airport is Ahmedabad Airport.

== History ==
The name Kheda originated from the Sanskrit term Kshetra (lit. 'land or field'). Situated at the confluence of the Vatrak and Shedhi rivers, local mythology links the region to the ancient movements of peoples across India. The area has a long documented history, evolving from an ancient regional territory into a prominent urban center. The earliest linguistic reference to the region dates back to the Ganapatha (c. 2nd century BCE), an appendix to Pāṇini's Sanskrit grammar treatise, which records Khetaka as a geographical name of the broader region. The region is also mentioned as Divyanagar in 133rd chapter of Padmapurana. The regional identity persisted into the early medieval period.

Seventh- and eighth-century copperplate grants issued by the Maitraka dynasty of Valabhi explicitly designate Khetaka as a major administrative division (mandala or vishaya). The town gained prominence as a strategic administrative and military center in the early eighth century. Following the Arab (Tājika) incursions into the Maitraka capital of Valabhi around 705-706 CE, the Maitraka rulers shifted their administrative focus. They began issuing royal copper-plate charters from military camps (jayaskandhāvāra) based primarily in Khetaka, making a shift in the regional power structure that sustained the dynasty for over half a century.

From the 12th through the 17th centuries, Khetaka maintained its prominence, now as a recognized, well-defined town and urban settlement. Copperplate grants from the Rashtrakuta Empire identify Khetaka as a major Rashtrakuta-controlled town and a prominent center of Brahmin settlement, with 750 villages under its jurisdiction. The town is also mentioned in the Nimbavati story of the Dashakumaracharita, Ācārāṅga Sūtra, Merutunga's Prabandhachintamani (1305 CE), Puratana-prabandha-sangraha (compiled before the 15th century by multiple authors) and Jinaprabha's Vividh-tirtha-kalpa (c. 1332 CE).

It was under Chaulukya and Vaghela dynasties from 10th to the start of the 14th century, after which it was brought under the Gujarat Sultanate. The town of Kheda passed to the Babi Dynasty (of Pashtun descent) early in the eighteenth century and remained with them until 1763, when it was taken by the Marathas under Damajirao Gaekwad. It was during Babi rule that Mahmad Khan Babi built the town's fort. The Marathas under Anandrao Gaekwad ceded the district to the British in 1803, and it became part of the Bombay Presidency of British India. Even so, Kaira was still entitled, at least as late as 1901, to a tribute of 488 rupees from the Koli petty princely state of Ghorasar. Kheda was a large military station until 1830, when the cantonment was moved to Deesa.

Kheda is also where, on 22nd March 1918, Mahatma Gandhi launched the Satyagraha campaign against oppressive British taxation during a famine.

== Koli Rebellion Of Kheda ==
The Koli Rebellion Of Kheda was raised by Koli Patels and koli Thakors against East India Company in 1803. The EIC claimed the kheda and surrounding villages and made his rules for peoples. But kolis refused to obey their rules. Koli chiefs (Thakors and Patels) declared the end of Company rule. First koli chiefs filed petitions in Court of Law in Kheda stating that Company government have no authority over kolis but koli chiefs were ignored. The koli chiefs started raiding and plundering the British territories. In 1808, koli chieftains started raids in cities and villages, stealing the crops, animals and other possessions. The town of Dholka Taluka was main target of kolis. The armed kolis numbering one hundred and fifty attacks at dholka and respectfully returned into their villages. East India Company was unable to control the raids of koli chiefs.

== Geography ==
Kheda is located at 22.75°N 72.68°E. It has an average elevation of 21 metres (68 feet). Kheda is on the banks of Vatrak and Shedhi rivers.

== Population ==
=== Demographics ===
As of 2001 India census, Kheda had a population of 27000. Males constitute 52% of the population and females 48%. Kheda has an average literacy rate of 70%, higher than the national average of 59.5%: male literacy is 77%, and female literacy is 63%. In Kheda, 13% of the population is under 6 years of age.

=== Castes and Clans ===
The clans of Jats in Gujarat are similar to those of Jats of North India. The following clans are found in the Kheda District. The way they are written in Gujarati is given in brackets. Kheda District is one of few districts in Gujarat with a Jat population (Banas Kantha, Mehsana, Sabar Kantha, Kutchh, etc.)

- Chauhan, Chawan, Chahar (Chauhan)
- Gaur, Goru (Gaur, Gor)
- Godara-Godha (Goda)
- Gulia (Galia)
- Maan (Manar)

Jain Religion is Most developed in Kheda. Rajputs in this District are usually of the Chauhan clan. Rajputs have had a huge influence in this area as in the state of Gujarat in general. There are Vohra/Vora Gujjar populations also.

Many of the villages have names based on the clans of Jats who inhabited them, including :

- Sunda (jat)
- Odasi (jat)
- Narwar (jat)
- Pichkya (jat)

== Visiting places ==
There is one temple of Meldi Mata in Kheda, which holds an annual fair in February. Around 100,000 people visit Kheda for this event.

== Economy ==
Tobacco farming is widespread.

== Transport ==
The city is 35 kilometres (22 mi) from Ahmedabad. The National Highway No. 48 connecting Ahmedabad and Mumbai passes through Kheda. The nearest railway station is Mahemadavad Kheda Road. All types of state bus and local transporter are available.
