= Manibhai Jashbhai =

Rao Bahadur Dewan Bahadur Manibhai Jashbhai
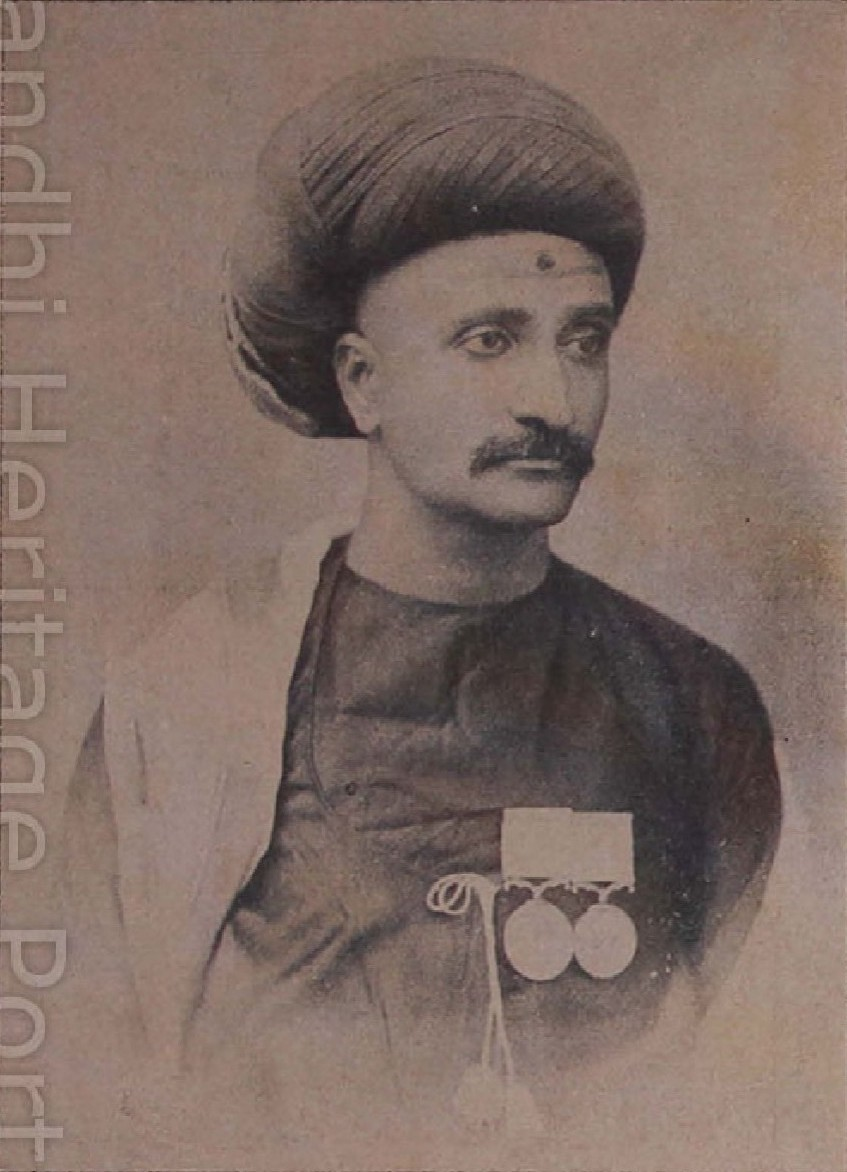
- Born: 1844; Nadiad, Kaira district, British India
- Died: 1900 (aged 55–56); Petlad, Kaira district, British India
- Occupation(s): Dewan, government officer and writer
- Parents: Jashbhai Haribhai Mehta (father); Gangaba (mother)
- Relatives: Sitanshu Yashaschandra (great-grandson) Tarini Desai(great-grand daughter) Dhvani Desai (great-great grand daughter) Sanskritirani Desai (great-great grand daughter)

Manibhai Jashbhai Mehta (1844–1900) was a dewan (minister) of Kutch and Baroda State during British India. He was the first person in Gujarat to receive the title of Dewan Bahadur. He played a key-role in the establishment of Oriental Institute, Baroda.

== Biography ==
Manilal Jashbhai was born in 1844 at Nadiad to his father, Jashbhai Haribhai Mehta, a faujdar (police officer), and his mother, Gangaba. He was Vadanagara Nagar Brahmin by caste. He received his schooling at different schools in Mahudha, Nadiad and Petlad. He completed his English education in Nadiad and Ahmedabad. After matriculation, he, at the age of 18, was appointed an assistant teacher at the same school where he studied.

In 1870, Gokulji Zala, a dewan of Junagadh State, appointed him as a chief justice of Junagadh state. Impressed by his ability, the political agent of Palanpur State appointed him as a native assistant in 1872. From 1872, he worked for some time as a native assistant of British regency of Baroda State. In 1875, he received the title of Rao Bahadur.

In 1876, he was appointed a dewan of Kutch State. He saw the opportunity to develop the state in his appointment. He ended the disputes with Bhayyats and made Rao's position stronger. He focused on agriculture, business, naval security, water and forestry to strengthen the state economy. He carried out various public works including the establishment of girls schools, Sanskrit schools and museums. When he opposed the move to hand over salt production of the State to British Raj, he was transferred to Baroda State.

In 1883, when Khengarji III became Rao of Kutch, he brought Manilal back from Baroda. During this time, he received the title of Dewan Bahadur, and became the first person in Gujarat to receive the title. Two years later, he returned to Baroda in 1885 and was appointed a deputy dewan by Maharaja Sayajirao Gaekwad III. In 1890, he was promoted to the position of dewan. Under him, Baroda became the most progressive state in Gujarat. He played a key-role in the establishment of Oriental Institute, Baroda. He retired from the state affairs in 1895 following a dispute with Maharaja.

He died in 1900 at Petlad. Mahatma Gandhi had praised his approach to educate students in their mother tongue.

== Works ==
Manibhai also contributed in literature. He adapted many scientific terms into Gujarati language. He appointed Manilal Dwivedi, a Gujarati writer, to prepare a list of manuscripts preserved in the libraries of Patan and established a department for translation, which later came to be known as the Oriental Institute, Baroda.

He was associated with Gujarati writers Ranchhodbhai Udayram Dave and Mansukhram Tripathi. In collaboration with other fellow writers, he published several books including Shakespeare Kathasamaj, Musalmani Kayada and Rajyaniti. He published a memorandum on woman welfare entitled A Memorandum on Hindu Female Education in the Bombay Presidency.

== See also ==
- List of Gujarati-language writers
