= Nagar Brahmin =

Gujarati Brahmin subcaste

Nagar Brahmins
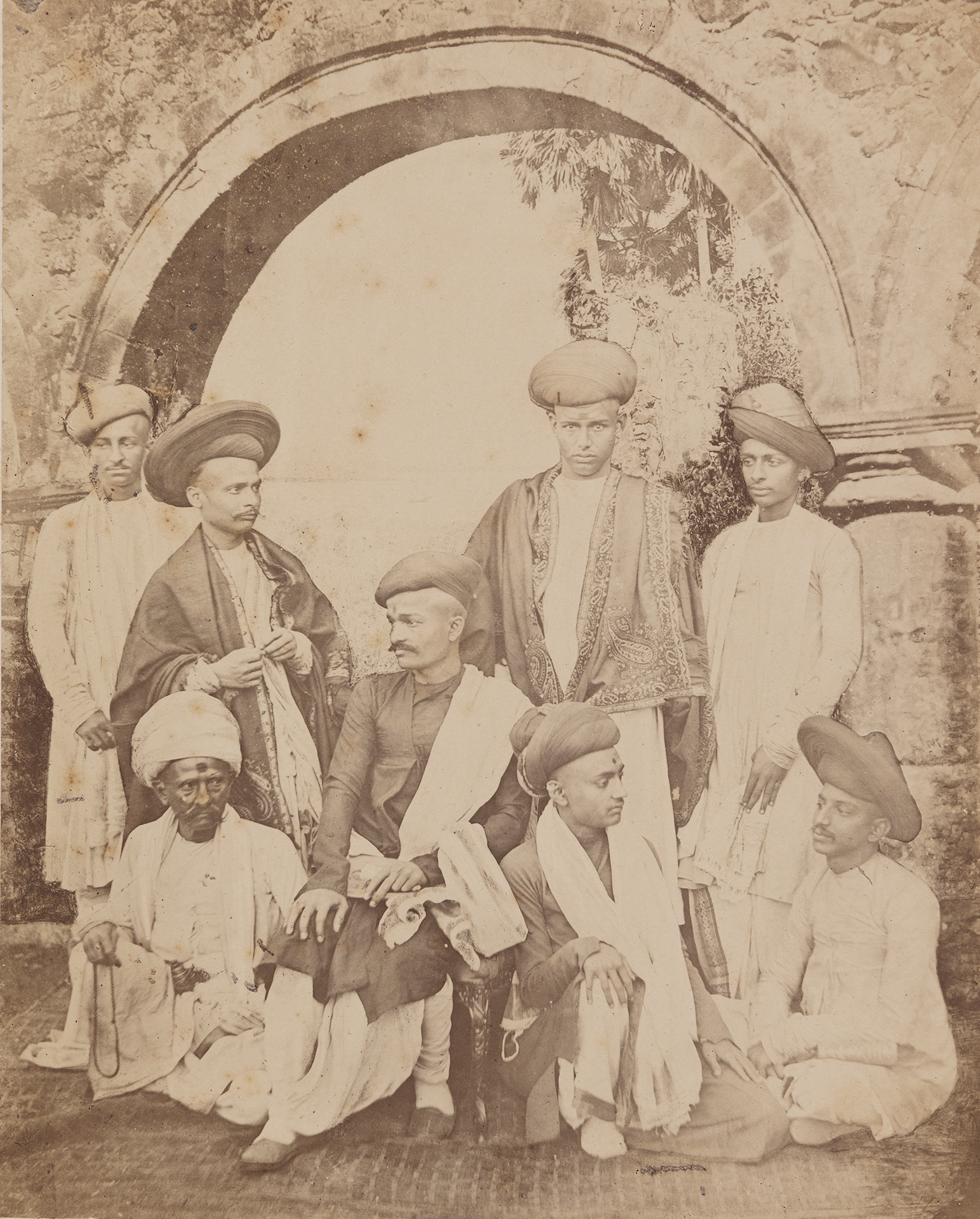
- Nagar Brahmins in Western India (c. 1855-1862)
- Religions: Hinduism
- Languages: Gujarati
- Country: India
- Populated states: Gujarat
- Region: Western India
- Ethnicity: Gujarati

Nagar Brahmin is a Brahmin subcaste from the Indian state of Gujarat.

Author T. Sasaki writes, amongst Brahmins of Gujarat, Nagar Brahmins were the most prominent subdivision in the political, economic and social activities of this region both before and during the British Raj. They occupied important administrative posts in the courts during the time of the Gujarat Sultanate and the Mughal Empire.

== History ==
The Nagar Brahmins originate in Vadnagar, in northern Gujarat, but are now mostly concentrated in Kathiawar. The name 'Nagar' is also believed to have come from their geographic origin, Vadnagar.

While a few scholars have explored potential connections between Nagar Brahmins and Bengali Kayasthas, this remains a subject of debate. D. R. Bhandarkar, as cited by Tej Ram Sharma, notes the presence of identical surnames in both communities. Separately, Rabindra Nath Chakraborty proposes a theory of common ancestry, suggesting a settlement of Nagar Brahmins in Bengal in the eighth century CE from whom the Kayasthas descended; however, this view and its historical basis have not been widely supported by other scholars. Historians such as H. K. Barpujari and R. C. Majumdar have contested a shared origin based on surnames, with Majumdar also questioning the evidence for significant Nagar Brahmin migration into Bengal. Harald Tambs-Lyche, in his analysis on Saurashtra, observes that the majority of Nagars are engaged in non-priestly roles as bureaucrats, ministers, and urban landowners, quite similar to Kayasthas. He suggests that Bengali Kayasthas represent a "parallel case" in terms of societal function, even without accepting the hypothesis on shared origin.

Among Nāgara Brahmins all four Vedas are found: R̥gveda (mainly Śāṅkhāyana Sūtra), Śukla Yajurveda (Mādhyandina), Sāmaveda (Kauthuma Śākhā), and Atharvaveda (Śaunaka Śākhā).

During the rule of the Caulukya and Vāghela dynasties, the Nāgars held prestigious positions in royal courts along with Jains and other Brahmins. Their occupations included writing Sanskrit literature, performing Vedic rituals, and conducting royal funerals; they were also famed throughout India as pilgrimage officiants at tīrtha (holy water) sites.

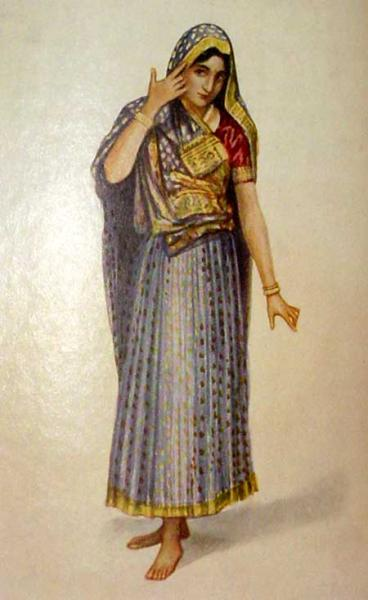
"A Nagar beauty," a watercolor by M. V. Dhurandhar, 1928

The Nāgara Khaṇḍa is a quasi-caste purana for the Vadnagar Nāgars. It was partly composed before the late 13th century up to circa 17th century and was added to the existing Skanda Purāṇa, as part of a wider trend of adding mainly unrelated khaṇḍas to the text. The text extols the holy sites around Vaḍanagara (historically known as Ānarta, Ānandapura, and Camatkārapura).

The Nāgars are divided into two sections: Gr̥hasthas who had received land grants from kings and did not have to work as priests, and Bhikṣus who earn money through alms from priesthood. In the Nāgarakhaṇḍa the Nāgars are divided into Nāgars who live in the city, and Bāhyas who had to live outside (often due to excommunication).

The Vaḍanagara Praśasti states that in the time of King Kumārapāla, a wall was built around the town for the protection of the "viprapura" ("Brāḥmaṇa town").

According to the Vastupāla Carita of Jinaharṣa Gaṇi, the Vāghela king Vīsaladeva formed the branches of the Nāgars at a yajña (sacrifice) at Darbhavatīpura (modern Dabhoi), the branches being the Vīsalanagara, Ṣaṭpadra, Kr̥ṣṇapura, Citrapura, and Praśnika branches. The subcastes of the Nagars are also known as Visnagarā, Sāṭhodarā, Kr̥ṣṇorā or Krasnora, Citroḍā, Praśnora.

In the later periods many Nāgars also became financiers and moneychangers, with Vadnagar as their center.

During the rule of the Gujarat Sultanate and Mughal Empire, the Nāgars learned Persian and held important posts in royal courts. Similarly under British rule, the Nāgars learned English and held administrative posts.

In the late 19th century, many leaders of the Gujarat Vernacular Society were Nāgars, along with Vaniyas. By the 19th century, the dialect of Gujarati as spoken by Nagar Brahmins in Ahmedabad had become the prestige dialect of Gujarati.

== Notable people ==
- Narsinh Mehta
- Padmanābha
- Ranchhodji Amarji Diwan
- Dayaram
- Gaurishankar Oza
- Durgaram Mehta
- Bholanath Divetia (Note: Bholanath was expelled for eating with Mahipatram Rupram, who had himself been expelled for travelling to a foreign country.)
- Ranchhodlal Chhotalal
- Vrajlal Shastri
- Mahipatram Rupram Nilkanth (Note: Mahipatram was expelled when he crossed the seas to travel to England.)
- Narmadashankar Dave
- Nandshankar Mehta
- Navalram Pandya
- Bhagvanlal Indraji
- Mansukhram Tripathi
- Manibhai Jashbhai
- Govardhanram Tripathi
- Balashankar Kantharia
- Harilal Dhruv
- Manilal Dwivedi
- Narsinhrao Divatia
- Keshavlal Dhruv
- Chinubhai Madhavlal
- Kavi Kant
- Ramanbhai Neelkanth
- Anandshankar Dhruv
- Uttamlal Trivedi
- Vidyagauri Nilkanth
- Sumant Mehta
- Durgashankar Kevalram Shastri
- Shardagauri Mehta
- Indulal Yagnik
- Hansa Mehta (Note: Hansa Mehta was expelled from the caste for her marriage to Jivraj Narayan Mehta.)
- Bhagwati Charan Vohra
- Shankarlal Shastri
- Nanabhai Bhatt
- Hariprasad Shastri
- Makrand Mehta
