= Guda Endla =

- Village
- Country: India
- State: Rajasthan
- District: Pali District

Population
  - Total: 10,000

Guda Endla is a village located in Pali District of Rajasthan in Western India. It has a population of about 10,000. Demographically, Guda Endla village is dominated by Meenas, Meghwal, Chaudhary and Jain communities.

The village is under Pali Lok Sabha and Sumerpur Vidhan Sabha constituencies respectively. Its nearby villages are Endla and Nava Chanod Girwar Kurna Kirva Balrai Vithoda. It has some sub parts such as Jogapura, Bhuta kheri, Ramnada and Rampura Ki Dhani. It has Gram Panchayat in middle of village which covers Endla and Rampura Ki Dhani also.

It is located 3 km from National Highway No. 14 near Kirva Village. The village is well connected with National highway and there are plenty of measure of transportation to reach District headquarters at Pali, Krishi Anaaj mandi and Kirana business centre, Sumerpur, hardware and electric / electronics market, Falna and Rani. Sheogang, approx 54 km, is a city which is famous for pharma products, clothes (Suitings, Shirting, Rajasthani Dresses, Chunri, Chunariaya Safa etc.), sweets and vegetable market. It is a hub for new bridal / wedding collections.

== Facilities ==
A police station has been situated here for over four decades. Other government offices like RMGB bank, Post Office, Revenue office, Water Works, Pali Zila Dugdh Utpadak Sahakari dairy, Aanganwadi Centre etc. running to serve the society. Two hospitals are there with ambulance and operation theater facilities.

=== Education ===
In the 1966s this village was an Education Center. Currently there are 4 schools: Higher Secondary, Primary, Middle Girls School and one private school.
