= Dayaram =

Gujarati Poet

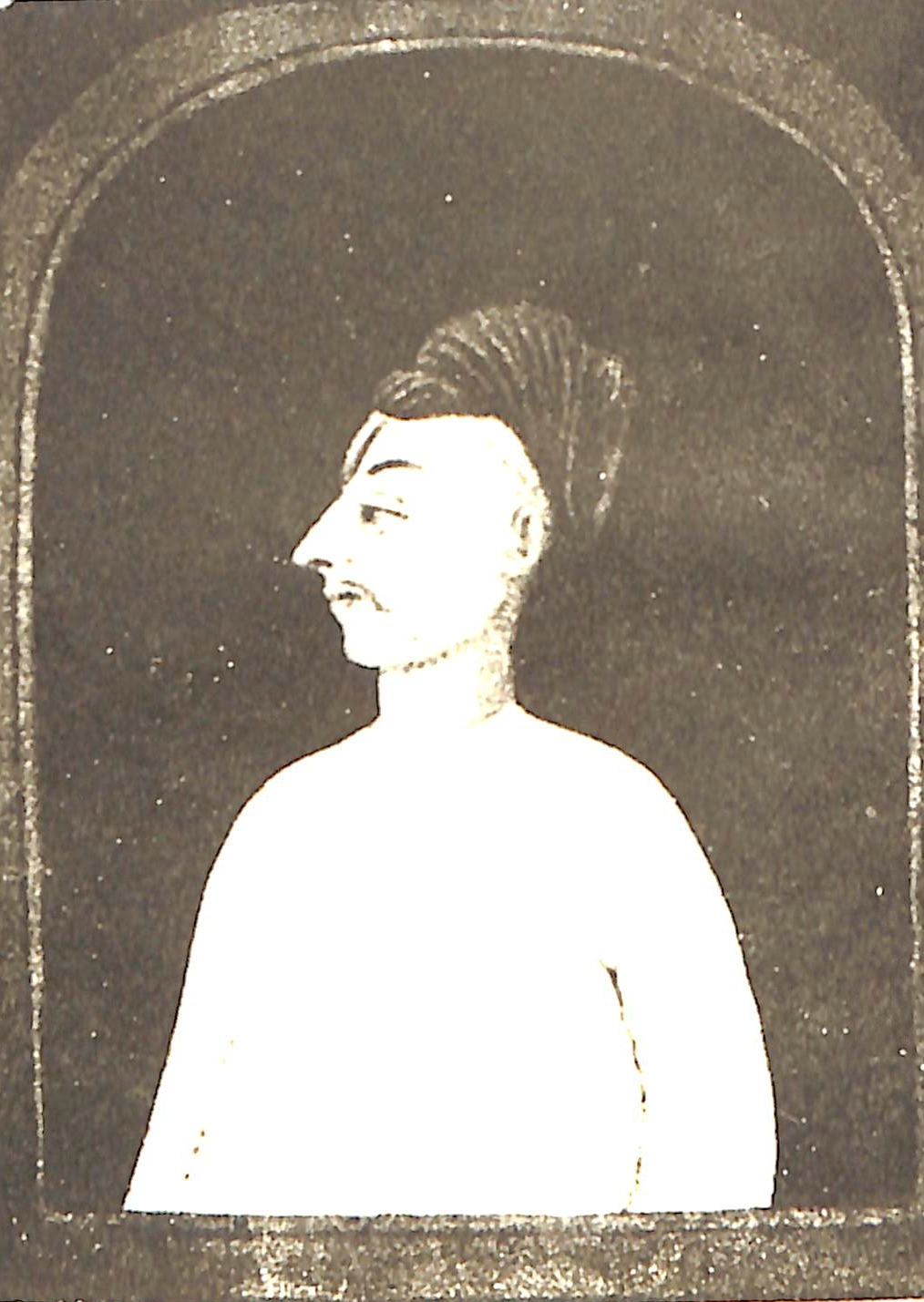
Dayaram

Dayaram (1777–1853) was a Gujarati poet of medieval Gujarati literature and was the last poet of the pre-British Gujarati school. He is known in Gujarati literature for his literary form called garbi, a lyric song. He was a follower of Pushtimarg of Hindu Vaishnavism. Dayaram, along with Narsinh Mehta and Meera, is considered a major contributor during the Bhakti movement in Gujarati literature.

== Biography ==
Dayārām was born on 16 August 1777 in Chanod on the bank of the Narmada River. He was born as the second son of Prabhurām and Mahālakṣmī into a Sāṭhodarā Nagar Brahmin family who belonged to the Śāṅkhāyaṇa śākhā of the R̥gveda. His siblings, elder sister Ḍāhīgaurī and younger brother Maṇiśaṅkar, died at the age of nine and two, respectively.

His father was a clerk. He had very little education, and he was interested in devotional songs of the Vaishnava temple. At the age of eight, he had his yajñopavīta and was married, but his wife died after two years of marriage. His father arranged his second marriage with a bride-price of six hundred rupees. However, the marriage never went through as his father would die when Dayāśaṅkar was ten and his mother, too, died two years later. He then resided with his maternal uncle, Raghunātha in Ḍabhoi and Chanod. In the nearby village of Karanali, an ascetic named Keśavānand was living, and Dayārām requested to be his student. Keśavānand, at first, rejected him, but later admitted him after Dayārām made a satirical poem criticising him. Dayārām as a boy was mischievous; he and a group of friends would tease women collecting water at the river and throw stones at their pots. Once Dayārām broke a goldsmith's wife's pot which was on her head, and she demanded to be compensated. Dayārām, having no money to pay, fled the village and the goldsmith's wrath, with the local villagers believing he committed suicide in the Narmadā. At the age of fourteen in the village of Tenatalāv, he met a Puṣṭimārga scholar named Icchārām Bhaṭṭajī. Icchārām encouraged him to travel across India on a pilgrimage of religious places, and travelled for fourteen years until settling back in Dabhoi at the age of twenty-six. His contact with Icchārām Bhaṭṭajī turned him to his religious interest. Later he would visit the four Dhāmas. He visited Nāthadvārā, the most central Puṣṭimārga site and location of Śrīnāthajī, seven times and drank the water of the Yamunā River four times. At Nāthadvāra gave a eulogy of Śrīnāthajī so impressive that the Māhārāj gave him an expensive scarf from Banāras. Once after visiting Mahākaleśvara in Ujjain he was travelling to Nasik he and his pilgrim party was ambushed by bandits in a jungle disguised as pilgrims. Three people were killed and the rest kidnapped. The chief robber was a Marāṭha named Mānājī Angre who demanded five hundred rupees as ransom for Dayārām. Dayārām composed a poem about his trouble which he sang for three days until he was freed by Mānājī and given fifteen rupees. In Tirupati at the shrine of Bālājī the Mahant or head of the shine was in the habit of kidnapping and extorting money from pilgrims. When Dayārām escaped at night he was recaptured he was not released until the Mahant was certain Dayārām was insolvent. Once in Baroda, his disciples Raṇachoḍbhāī and Girijāśaṅkar were singing his poems accompanied with tambūrā and tablā in public in Dayārām's presence. A Bāvā or ascetic pointed out a mistake Girijāśaṅkar made on the rhythm when playing the tablā, but Dayārām dismissed the mistake as minor. The Bāvā claimed that any competent musician wouldn't make such a mistake. Dayārām then challenged him to play the tablā to his singing, and the match continued the entire night until Dayārām sang a lyric so complex the Bāvā made a mistake. Dayārām, though having beaten the Bāvā, gave him his golden necklace worth roughly three hundred rupees. While Dayārām remained a bachelor throughout his life, he found companionship at the age of forty-six with Ratanbāī, a forty-five-year-old former child widow of a goldsmith caste. The pair lived together with Dayārām preparing the meals due to his higher caste. Dayārām claimed that she had been his wife in a former life. When he had fallen sick in 1842, he created a will in which he left her twenty five rupees out of the six hundred he had to his name. When he later died in 1853, he left her one thousand rupees worth of gold jewelry, but the ornaments were stolen by his relatives instead and she spent the last fourteen years of her life in poverty.

He was initiated into Pushtimarg (Brahmasambandha) in A.D. 1803-04 by Gosvāmī Vallabhalālajī of the Vanamāḷījī temple in Nathdwara. However, he sometimes had disputes with the Mahārājas of the sect. Once when his guru Puruṣottamajī Mahārāja of Bundi-Kotah came to Ḍabhoi rumours reached him that Dayārām was short-tempered and should be banned from the local temple. Puruṣottam agreed to this and in response Dayārām composed verses criticising him. When Puruṣottam went to meet him at his house, Dayārām threw his tulsī kaṁṭhī at him after which the Mahārāj apologised and personally put the kaṁṭhī back on his neck. On another occasion a Mahārāja had come to Dabhoi and Dayārām was invited to pay respects. However Dayārām would only go on the condition that his seat would not be lower than that of the Mahārāja. The Mahārāja grudgingly agreed, but when the time came the seat that Dayārām was going to sit on was removed. A furious Dayārām then tore up his tulsī necklace and left. Due to this incident he stopped receiving money from a Puṣṭimārga patron.

Dayārām notably lacked financial responsibility. Annually, he earned two hundred rupees through gifts. Once Dayārām decided to hold a caste dinner, so his contacts sent him in total two thousand rupees to pay for the event, but he ended up spending four thousand rupees. Every day he would eat thirty to forty betel leaves, and would only wear the finest and most expensive clothes. Once when his tailor sewed his aṅgarkhuṁ too tight in the shoulders, Dayārām threw his pen and ink stand at him.

== Works ==
Dayaram was the last poet of the old Gujarati school. Most of his works are written in a literary form called garbi, a lyric song.

Dayaram was a devotional poet and was a follower of "Nirgun bhakti sampraday" (Pushti sampraday) in Gujarat. So he gave many garbi describing Krishna. He used many literary, poetic forms to express his devotion. He also wrote long narrative poems based on the incidents on the Mahabharata, such as Rukmani Vivah (Marriage of Rukmini), Satyabhama Vivah (Marriage of Satyabhama), Ajamilakhyana (Story of Ajamila), Okhaharan (abduction of Aniruddha by Chitralekha).

Dave divides Dayārām's works into seven categories: philosophical works, name of Kr̥ṣṇa/didactic works, narrative works, translations, lyrics, prose works, and miscellaneous works, although he is most renowned for his lyrical poems.

=== Non-lyrical Works ===
Dayārām's non-lyrical works strongly promot the Puṣṭimārga, but are of little literary value and are not well-known. A large portion or perhaps the majority of these works remain unpublished. His philosophical texts followed the sectarian Śuddhādvaita doctrine of the Puṣṭimārga, with his most famous being the Rasikavallabha (1838). He authored a few works concerned with the devotional recitation of the names of Kr̥ṣṇa, Vallabha, Viṭṭhalanātha, hagiographies of Vaiṣṇava devotees, and didactic dramatic dialogue between devotees. Dayārām's narrative poems based on Puranic and Vaiṣṇava hagiographic lore are considered of inferior literary quality. Dayārām is also generally considered to have composed Gujarati translations of the Sanskrit Bhagavad Gīta and Braj Bhasha works of Sūrdās.

=== Language ===
Dayārām wrote in a language similar to modern standard Gujarati with some grammatical variations. These variations have been described as archaisms, dialectal features, or borrowings from Braj Bhasha. His vocabulary is a mix of words, with tatsama forms dominating, however Dayārām still uses Perso-Arabic loanwords which were later eliminated from literary language in the nineteenth century.

== See also ==
- List of Gujarati-language writers
