= Harilal =

Harilal is an Indian name. It may refer to:

- Harilal Dhruv, Indian lawyer and poet.
- Harilal Gandhi, eldest son of Mohandas Karamchand Gandhi.
- Harilal Jekisundas Kania, Chief Justice of India.
- Harilal Madhavjibhai Patel, Indian politician.
- Harilal Manilal Patel, Fijian lawyer and politician.
- Harilal Upadhyay, Gujarati novelist and poet.
- Chimanlal Harilal Setalvad, Indian barrister and jurist.
