= Vatav =

Vatav is a small village located in Petlad Taluka in Anand district, Gujarat, India. As of the 2011 Census of India, it had a population of 2,484. The pin code of Vatav is 388450.

The nearest town is Petlad which is located 4 km (2.5 mi) from Vatav, and is the sub-district's headquarters. The total geographical area of Vatav is 2.7 km^{2} (1.0 sq mi), making it the 13th smallest village by area in the sub-district. The village comes under Vatav panchayat. Vatav is administrated by a sarpanch (village head) who is an elected representative.

== Demographics ==
Particulars	Total	Male	Female
Population	2,484	1,307	1,177
Child (0–6)	306	164	142
Scheduled Caste	235	119	116
Scheduled Tribe	7	5	2
Literacy	80.62%	90.90%	69.28%
Total Workers	1,035	703	332
Main Worker	627	0	0
Marginal Worker	408	134	274

As of the 2011 Census of India, Vatav comprised 514 families, with 2,484 people total. 1307 are males while 1177 are females. The population density of the village is 927 persons per km^{2.}

In Vatav village population of children with age 0-6 is 306 which makes up 12.32% of total population of village. Average Sex Ratio of Vatav village is 901 which is lower than Gujarat state average of 919. Child Sex Ratio for the Vatav as per census is 866, lower than Gujarat average of 890.

Vatav village has higher literacy rate compared to Gujarat. In 2011, literacy rate of Vatav village was 80.62% compared to 78.03% of Gujarat. In Vatav Male literacy stands at 90.90% while female literacy rate was 69.28%.
