= Fangani =

Fagani
- town
- Country: India
- State: Gujarat
- District: Anand

Languages
  - Official: Gujarati, Hindi
- Time zone: UTC+5:30 (IST)
- Vehicle registration: GJ-
- Website: gujaratindia.com

Fangani is a small village located 2 km near Petlad in Gujarat, India. The town is near Anand, one of the biggest cities of Gujarat. Fangani has a population of around 3500.
