= Gujarat Itihas Parishad =

The Gujarat Itihas Parishad is an Indian organization dedicated to the study of the history of Gujarat. It was proposed at the 20th session of the Indian History Congress in 1957 at Vallabh Vidyanagar, Gujarat and was established in 1960. The first president was Hariprasad Shastri. The parishad organizes a biennial conference in which new papers are presented in the field of Gujarat's history, culture, and archaeology which are submitted into an essay competition. The parishad also publishes reference works and booklets on the history of Gujarat.

== Notable members ==
- Hariprasad Shastri
- Makrand Mehta
