= Shankarlal Shastri =

Shankarlal Gangashankar Shastri (2 May 1902 – 1 June 1946) was a Gujarati literary critic and short-story writer. He was an elder brother of Hariprasad Shastri and a grandson of Vrajlal Shastri.

== Biography ==
Shastri was born into a Sathodara Nagar Brahmin family on 2 May 1902 at Chunel, a village near Nadiad in Bombay Presidency, British India. He was the second son of Gangashankar Shastri, a physician and ritualist. His younger brother Hariprasad Shastri was also a Gujarati writer, historian and indologist.

Shastri completed his primary education in Malataj and his secondary education in Sojitra. After passing his matriculation in 1919, he joined Gujarat College, from which he received his Bachelor of Arts in 1923 and Master of Arts in 1925 with Sanskrit and Gujarati subjects. He received a Bachelor of Laws degree in 1929.

Shastri started his career as a teacher at the government high school of Nadiad and then moved to The Proprietary High School, Ahmedabad, where he taught for four years. After intermittently practising as a lawyer, he was appointed a professor of Sanskrit and Gujarati in 1932 at Bahauddin College, Junagadh, where he taught for fourteen years.

He died on 1 June 1946.

== Works ==
Shastri wrote Sahityane Ovarethi (1938) in two volumes; volume one presents observations and assessments of some prominent Gujarati writers and volume two contains articles on medieval and modern writers. He also wrote Sahityadrashtane (1941) in two volumes; the first volume one explains general literary topics and the second presents a study of Gujarati writers from Premanand to Janmashankar Buch 'Lalit'.

Panadani (1941) is a collection of short stories. Shastri edited and published his grandfather Vrajlal Shastri's unpublished book Rasaganga in 1934.

== See also ==
- List of Gujarati-language writers
