= Primary Health Centre (India) =

Type of public health care facility in India

- Ministry of Health and Family Welfare
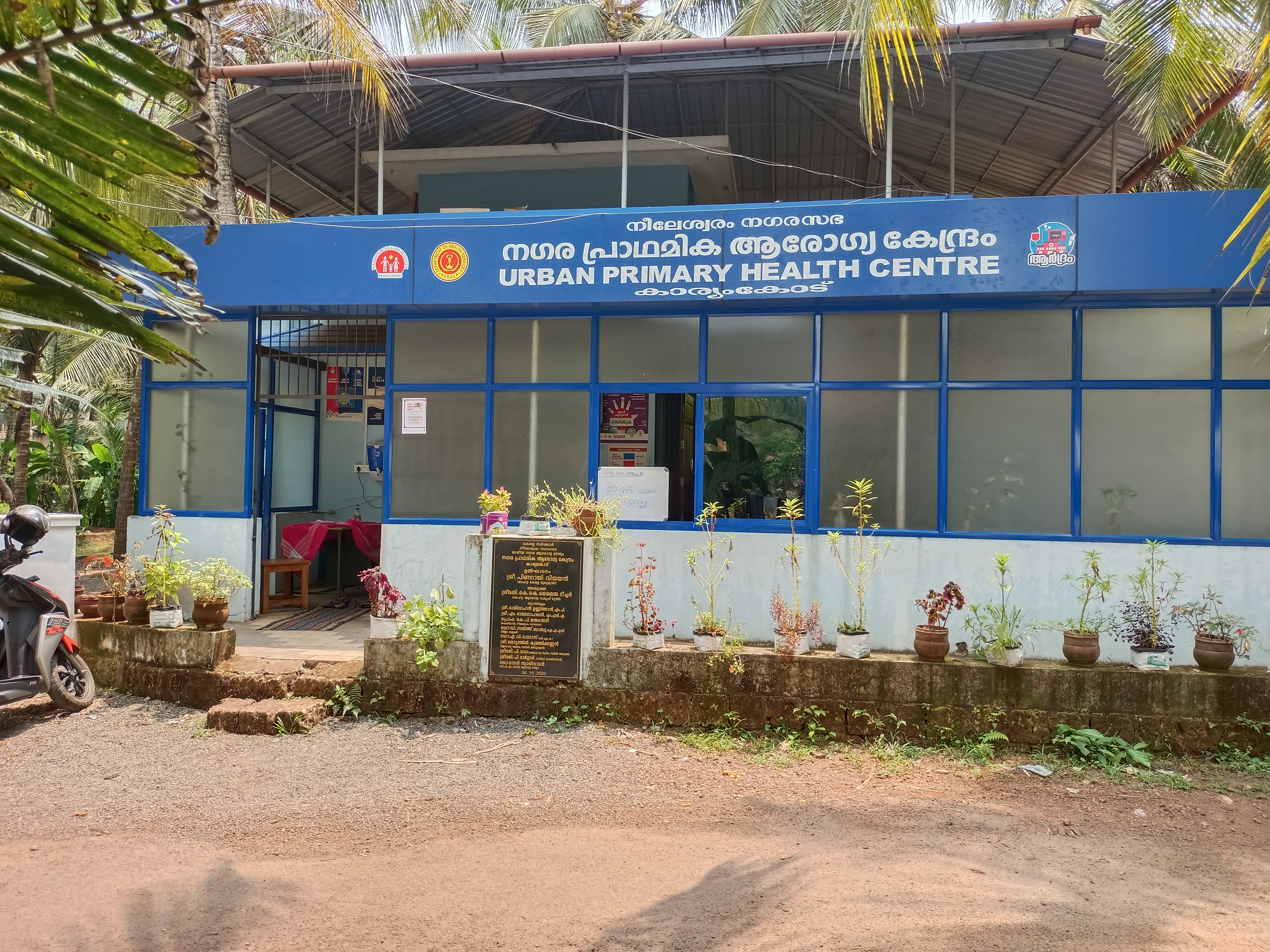
- An Urban Primary Health Center, under National Health Mission in Kerala

Primary Health Centre (PHCs), sometimes referred to as public health centres, are state-owned rural and urban health care facilities in India. They are essentially single-physician clinics usually with facilities for minor surgeries. They are part of the government-funded public health system in India and are the most basic units of this system. As on 31 March 2019 there are 30,045 PHCs in India in which 24,855 are located in rural areas and 5,190 are in urban areas. The idea of creating PHCs in India was set forward by Bhore committee in 1946.

== Gellery ==
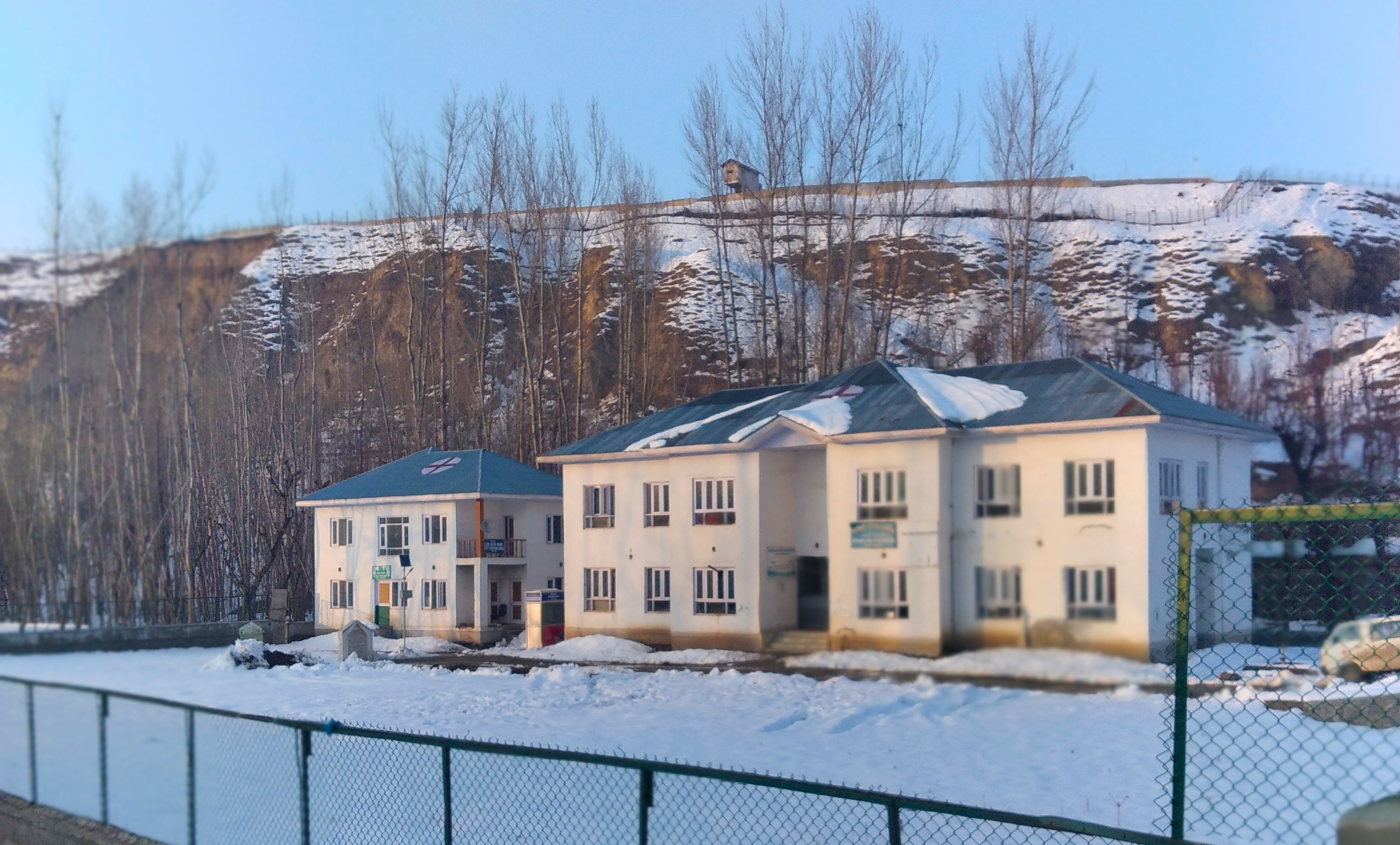
Primary Health Center located in the Kalbal area of Ichgam in January 2021

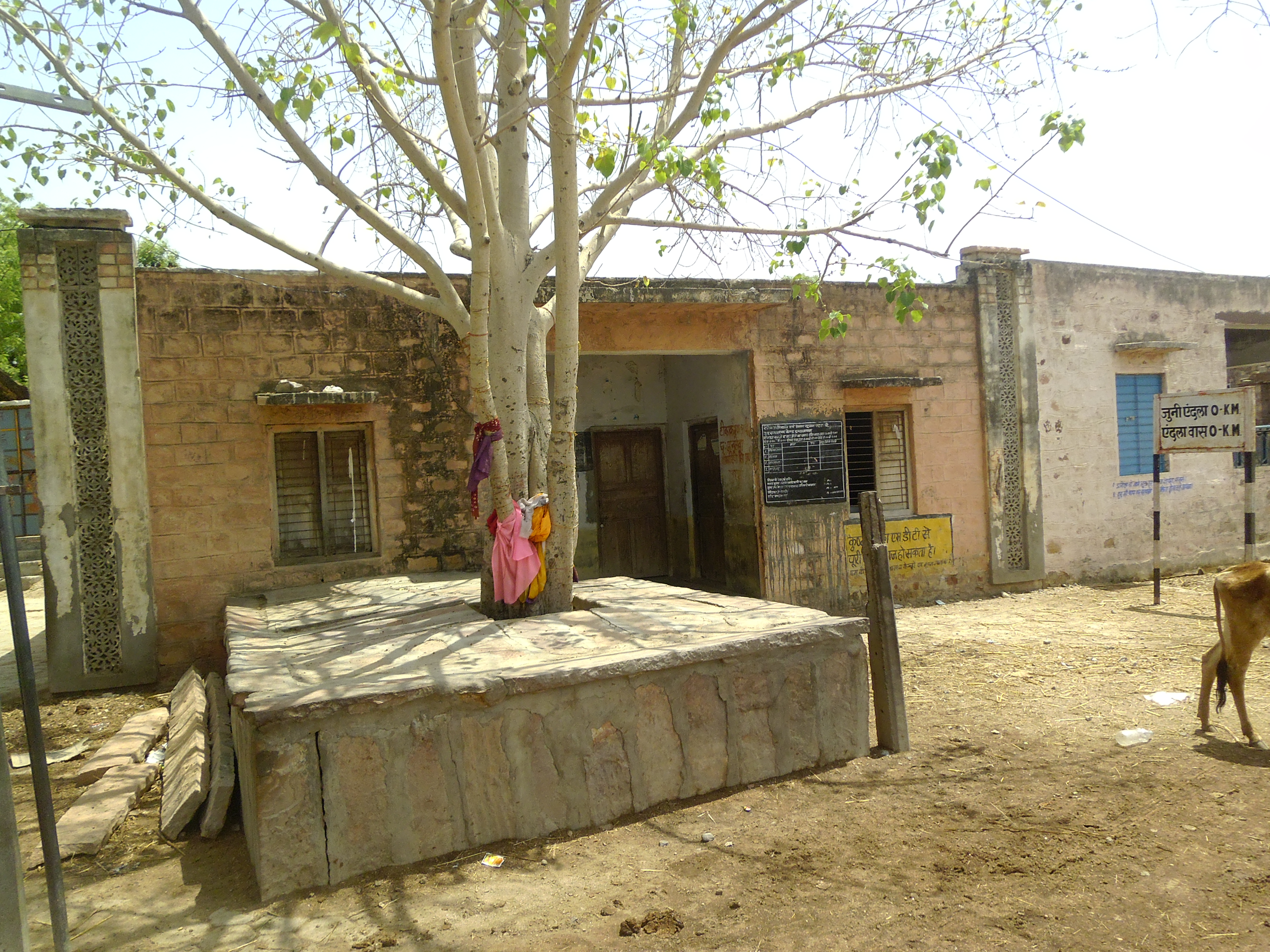
A primary health centre Endla, Rajasthan.

== List ==
Primary Health Centre programmes are listed below:

- Provision of medical care
- Maternal-child health including family planning
- Safe water supply and basic sanitation
- Prevention and control of locally endemic diseases
- Collection and reporting of vital statistics
- Education about health
- National health programmes, as relevant
- Referral services
- Training of health guides, health workers, local dais and health assistants
- Basic laboratory workers
- First PHC established in 1952.

== See also ==
- Primary Health Care
- Mohalla Clinics
- Swachh Bharat Abhiyan
- Alma-Ata declaration
- Health care in India
