= Hariprasad Shastri =

Indian scholar, historian, epigraphist, Indologist and editor (1919-2014)

- Born: 17 October 1919; Malataj, Petlad, British India
- Died: 9 August 2014 (aged 94); Ahmedabad, Gujarat, India
- Occupations: Historian, epigraphist, Indologist
- Spouse: Shridevi Bhatt (m. 1947)
- Children: Nandan (son)
- Writing career
- Language: Gujarati
- Notable awards: Narmad Suvarna Chandrak (1951); Ranjitram Suvarna Chandrak (1960); Kumar Suvarna Chandrak (1975)

Academic background
- Thesis: Gujarat Under the Maitrakas of Valabhī: History and Culture of Gujarat During the Maitraka Period, Circa 470-788 A.D. (1947)
- Doctoral advisor: Rasiklal Parikh

Hariprasad Gangashankar Shastri (17 October 1919 – 9 August 2014) was an Indian scholar, historian, epigraphist, Indologist and editor primarily known for his work on the political and cultural history of Gujarat state. He spent much of his career at the B. J. Institute of Learning and Research, Ahmedabad, as a lecturer, professor, deputy director and then as director.

== Early life ==
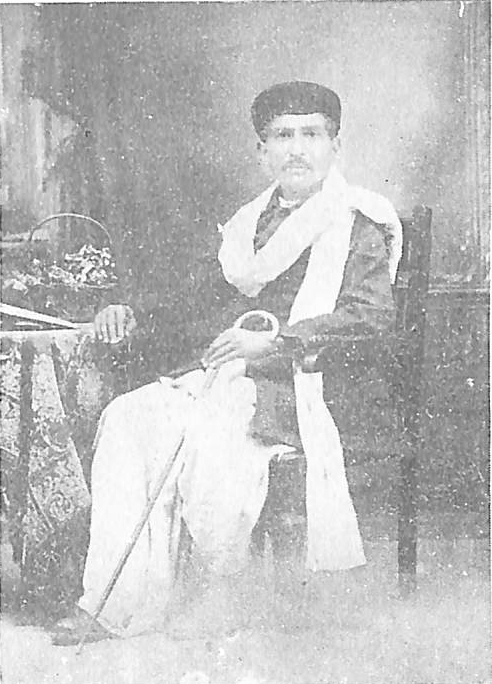
Gangashankar Shastri, father of Hariprasad Shastri

Hariprasad Shastri was born on 17 October 1919 at Malataj, a village near Petlad. He was the youngest son of Gangashankar Shastri, a physician and ritualist. His elder brother, Shankarlal Shastri, was a professor of Sanskrit at the Bahauddin College, Junagadh and a Gujarati literary critic. His grandfather, Vrajlal Kalidas Shastri (1825–1892) was a scholar of Sanskrit and Prakrit languages as well as a pioneer philologist of Gujarati and the youngest brother of the saint-poet, Chhotam (1812–1885).

He married Shridevi Bhatt, daughter of an educationalist Karunashankar Kuberji Bhatt, in 1947. They had a son.

== Education ==
Hariprasad Shastri was educated at the primary school of his village, Malataj (1924–1930), and then attended A. V. High School, Malataj (1930–1932). He moved to Junagadh and joined Bahadur Khanji High School in 1932, from where, he matriculated in 1936. He received BA in 1940 and MA with Sanskrit (Epigraphy) and Ardhamagadhi language as his major subjects in 1942 from the University of Bombay.

Later, he joined the Gujarat Vernacular Society, Ahmedabad, as a lecturer, and started his research under the guidance of Rasiklal Parikh. He wrote his thesis on the Political and Cultural History of the Maitraka Kingdom of Vallabhi on the basis of inscriptions of the Maitraka dynasty, and was awarded PhD in 1947.

== Academic career ==
In 1945, Shastri joined the B. J. Institute of Learning and Research, Ahmedabad, as a lecturer where he taught Indian Culture and Sanskrit. He took roles of increasing responsibilities and was recognized as a P.G. teacher in Indian Culture in the year 1952 and in Sanskrit in the year 1956, by Gujarat University. In 1958, he was promoted as an assistant director of the B. J. Institute and served on this position for six years. He served there as the director from 1968 to his retirement in 1979. He also served as a professor at Shri Ramananda Mahavidyalay, Ahmedabad in 1955–1956 and L. D. Institute of Indology, Ahmedabad, in 1958–1962. He served as the president of Gujarat Itihas Parishad from 1960 to 1962.

He died on 9 August 2014 in Navrangpura, Ahmedabad.

== Works ==
Selected works by Shastri:

=== Gujarati ===
- Haḍappā ne Moheñjo-daḍo. Amadāvāda: Gujarāta Vidyāsabhā. 1952.
- Maitraka kālīna Gujarāta. Amadūbādā: Gujarāta Vidyasalā. 1955.
- Silona. 1969.
- Gujarātano prācīna itihāsa. Amadāvāda: Gujarāta Yunivarsiṭī. 1973.
- Cīnamāṁ prasarelī Bhāratīya Saṁskr̥ti. Amadāvāda: Gujarāta Yunivarsiṭī. 1975.
- Itihāsanā sādhana tarīke Gujarātanā abhilekha. Amadāvāda: Itihāsa ane Saṁskr̥ti Vibhāga, Gujarāta Vidyāpīṭha. 1983.
- Saṁskāra-mūrti keḷavaṇīkāra Karuṇāśaṅkara. Amadāvāda: Śrī Karuṇāśaṅkara Śatābdī Samiti. 1991.
- Jīvana-smr̥ti. Amadāvāda.
- Indian culture Extended in Indonesia (1957)
- Ancient India (in two parts) (1970)
- Asoka and His Inscription (1972)
- Portions of Political and Cultural History of Gujarat (1972–87)
- Indian Epigraphy (1973)
- Indian Culture Spread in China (1975)
- The Source of the Ancient History of Gujarat (1978)
- Indian Numismatics (co-authored P. C. Parikh, 1979)
- Ancient Spread of Indian Culture in Neighbouring Countries (co-authored with S. S. Shah, 1980)
- Buddhist Architecture in India (1983)
- Charotar Reflected in Mirror of History (1989)
- Studies and Research (1991)

=== English ===
- A Historical and Cultural Study of the Inscriptions of Gujarat up to 1304 A.D. (1989)
- History and Culture of Gujarat during the Maitraka Period

Besides writing above books, Shastri also edited several books related to history of Gujarat. He served as an editor for a Gujarati magazine Buddhiprakash in 1957-58. He had authored or co-authored about 775 research papers.

== Recognition ==
- Narmad Suvarna Chandrak for 1951 awarded by Narmad Sahitya Sabha in 1958 for his book Maitrakkalin Gujarat.
- Ranjitram Suvarna Chandrak for 1960 awarded by Gujarat Sahitya Sabha in 1962 for his contributions in historical research.
- Kumar Suvarna Chandrak (1975).
- Haridas V. Gokani Gold Medal for the research paper Shrikrishna in Harivamsa: A Critical Study presented at the 8th session of Gujarat Itihas Parishad, Patan, 1975.

== Selected papers ==
- Shastri, Hariprasad (1947). "The Fall of the Valabhi Kingdom". Proceedings of the Indian History Congress. 10. Indian History Congress: 238–241. JSTOR 44137138.
- Shastri, Hariprasad (1959). "The Puranic Chronology of the Mauryan Dyansty". Proceedings of the Indian History Congress. 22. Indian History Congress: 78–83. JSTOR 44304272.
- Shastri, Hariprasad (1960). "Lacunae in the Study of the Early History of Gujarat". Proceedings of the Indian History Congress. 23, Part–II. Indian History Congress: 170–173. JSTOR 44137534.
- Shastri, Hariprasad (1964). "The Date of the Foundation of Ahmedabad". Proceedings of the Indian History Congress. 26, PART II. Indian History Congress: 119–123. JSTOR 44140333.
