= Tarini Desai =

Gujarati short story writer (born 1935)

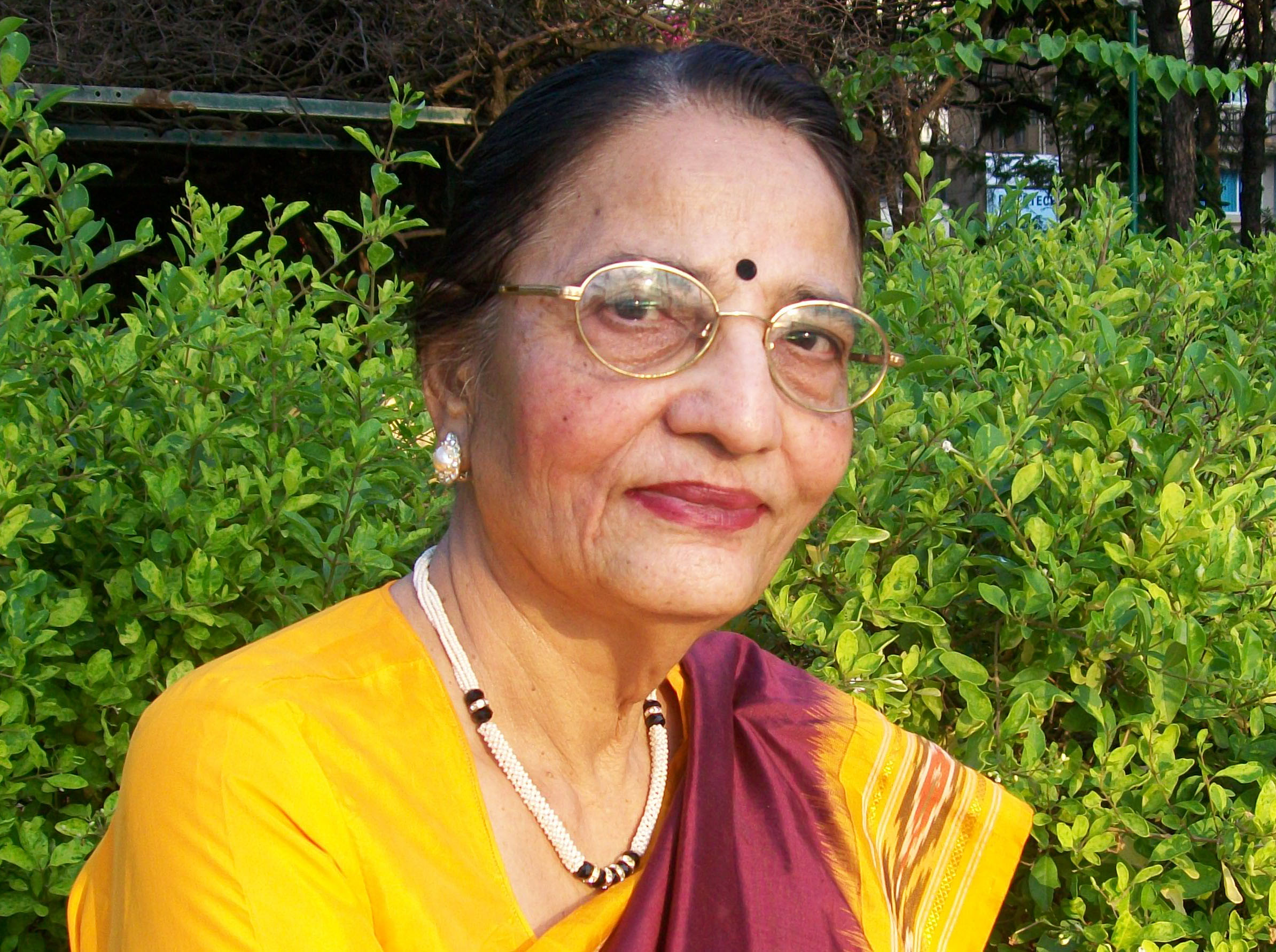
- Born: 22 December 1935 (age 90); Vadodara, British Raj
- Occupation: Gujarati Writer
- Spouse: Sudhir Desai (m. 1955)
- Children: Sanskar Desai; Sanskritirani Desai; Dhvani Desai

Tarini Desai (born 22 December 1935) is Gujarati short story writer from Gujarat, India.

== Life ==
She was born on 22 December 1935 at Baroda (now Vadodara) to Sudhaben and Rudrapratap Munshi. His family belonged to Petlad. She completed her primary and secondary education from Baroda. She completed B. A. in Philosophy and Psychology in 1957 from M. S. University and M. A. in Entire Philosophy from Wilson College, Bombay. She also obtained diploma in Indian classical music in 1956. She edited Kyarek, a literary magazine.

She married Sudhir Desai, Gujarati poet and critic, in 1955. They have a son, Sanskar Desai and two daughters, Sanskritirani Desai and Dhvani Desai.

== Works ==
She started writing during her college life. Her first radio feature Navratri was presented from Baroda Centre of Akashvani in 1951. Her other radio feature was presented in 1962 from Bombay Centre of Akashvani. Her first story Meeting was published in chandani magazine in 1966. Her short story Kabaro Pan Chali Shake Chhe was anthologized by Radheshyam Sharma in 1975.

Pag Bolta Lage Chhe (1984) was her first collection of fifteen short stories. Raja Maharaja Je (1992) has fourteen short stories centered around subject of "illusion". Maroon Jamli Gulabi (2003) was her third collection of experimental stories. Komal Pancham Ja (2008) is her other story collection. She has written children's stories, Chimpudada and Ganji Kanji ane Vanji. Tarinibahen Desai ni Shreshtha Vartao is a collection of her selected stories. Her stories are analysed in Tarinibahen Desai ni Vartao: Aaswad ane Avbodh is a book where several scholars have analysed and written on her stories. Saat Taali Ramadati Kshano is a collection of pen sketches.

She had acted in small role in TV series Prerana.

== Awards ==
In 2004, she was awarded Dhoomketu Award. Her story collections are awarded by Gujarat Sahitya Akademi and Gujarati Sahitya Parishad, Maharashtra Rajya Gujarati Sahitya Akademi etc . She is among the very few Gujarati writers who has won several awards from Govt of Gujarat and Maharashtra over a span of several years. She has been honoured with Jeevan Gaurav Puraskar by the Government for her contribution in Gujarati Literature in 2024.

== See also ==
- List of Gujarati-language writers
