= Makrand Mehta =

Indian historian (1931–2024)

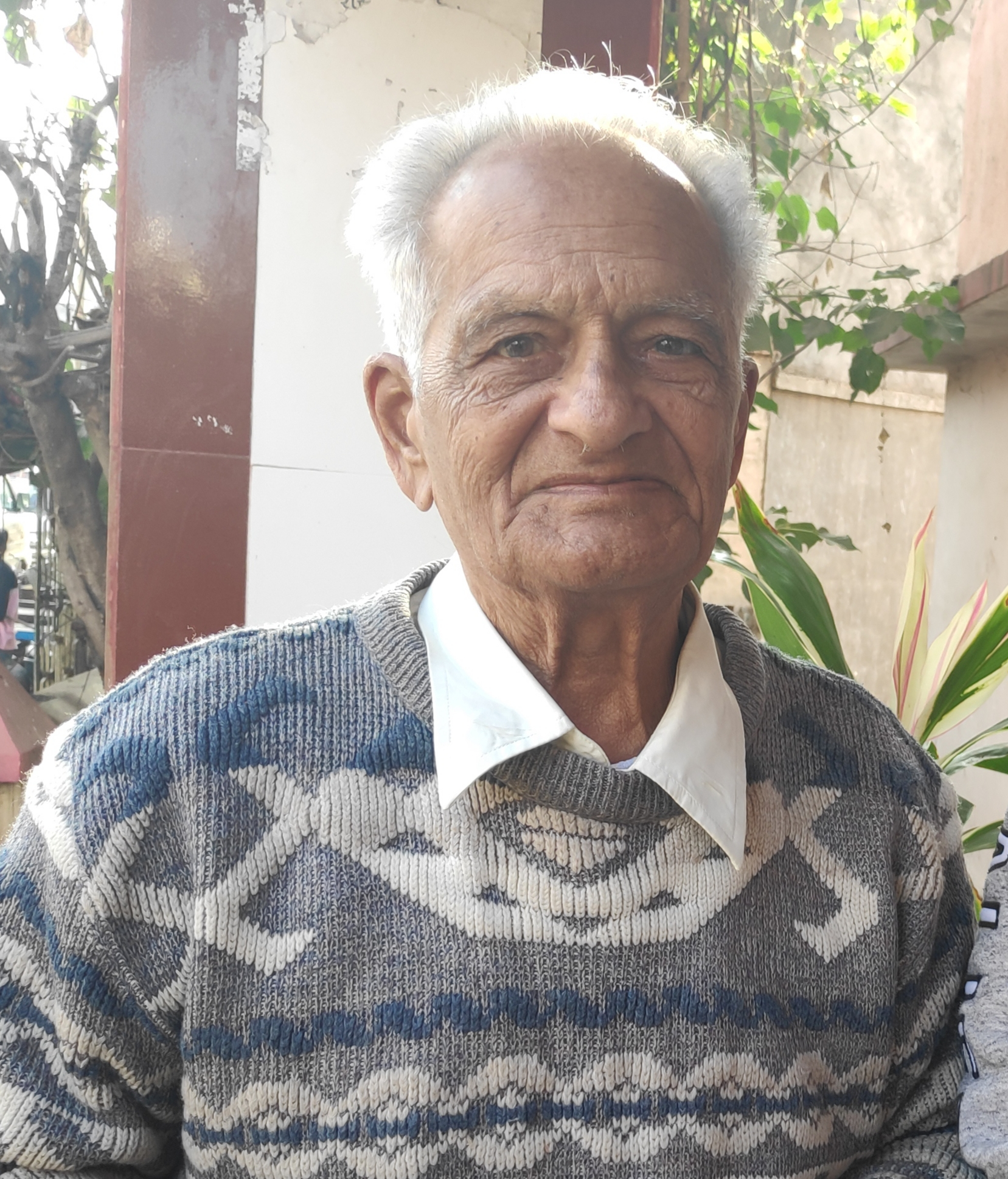
Mehta in 2020

Makrand Mehta (25 May 1931 – 1 September 2024) was an Indian social and business historian from Gujarat.

== Biography ==
Makrand Mehta was born on 25 May 1931 at Ahmedabad into a Nagar Brahmin family.

He studied at the Maharaja Sayajirao University of Baroda, University of Pennsylvania and Gujarat University.

He headed the Department of History at the School of Sciences, Gujarat University before retirement. He was associated with several organisations including Gujarat Itihas Parishad, Gujarat Vidyasabha and Darshak Itihas Nidhi.

Makrand Mehta was married to historian Shirin Mehta. He died from dengue in Ahmedabad, on 1 September 2024, at the age of 93.

== Works ==
Mehta wrote more than 25 books in English and Gujarati. He also published several papers on social and economic history. His last book Business Culture of Gujarat was published by Zen Opus, Ahmedabad, in December 2023.

His selected works are:

=== English ===
- The Ahmedabad cotton textile industry : genesis and growth. Ahmedabad: New Order Book Co. 1982.
- Urbanization in western India, historical perspective. Ahmedabad: Gujarat University. 1988.
- Regional roots of Indian nationalism : Gujarat, Maharashtra, and Rajasthan. New Delhi: Criterion Publications. 1990.
- Indian merchants and entrepreneurs in historical perspective : with special reference to shroffs of Gujarat, 17th to 19th centuries. Delhi: Academic Foundation. 1991.
- History of international trade and customs duties in Gujarat. Vadodara: Darshak Itihas Nidhi. 2016.
- Merchants and Ports of Gujarat. Vadodara: Darshak Itihas Nidhi. 2016.

==== Collaborative ====
- Tripathi, Dwijendra (1990). Business houses in western India : a study in entrepreneurial response, 1850-1956. New Delhi: Manohar Publications.

=== Gujarati ===
- Hindu varṇavyavasthā, samāja parivartana, ane Gujarātanā dalito. Amadāvāda: Amī Pablikeśana. 1995.
- Gujarātanā ghaḍavaiyā : sva-vikāsanī prayogaśāḷā. Amadāvāda: Aruṇodaya Prakāśana. 2007–2013.
- Itihāsa, samāja, ane sāhityamāṃ Gujarāta. Amadāvāda: Gujarātī Sāhitya Pariṣada. 2008.
- Gujarāta ane dariyo. Vaḍodarā: Darśaka Itihāsa Nidhi. 2012.
- Ārthika vikāsa ane samāja parivartananā sarjaka Kastūrabhāī Lālabhāī. Amadāvāda: Gūrjara Prakāśana. 2012.
- Saṃsthā-sthāpana ane samāja-parivartana : Gujarāta Varnākyulara Sosāyaṭīno udaya ane vikāsa (1848-1950). Amadāvāda: Gujarāta Vidyāsabhā vatī Gūrjara Grantharatna Kāryālaya. 2021.

== Reception ==
Mehta published a research paper titled Sectarian literature and Social Consciousness - A study of the Swaminarayan sect 1800-1840 in December 1986 in Arthat. It triggered a controversy among the followers of Swaminarayan Sampraday. In it, Mehta has contended that Sahajanand, who is believed to be an incarnation of Krishna by his followers, was only a social reformer who conspired with his followers to project himself as a god. He had also argued that the sect had done nothing for poor. In 1988, the followers of the sect received a permission from the government of Gujarat to lodge a case against him under section 295 A (Deliberate and malicious acts, intended to outrage religious feelings or any class by insulting its religion or religious beliefs) of Indian Penal Code.

== See also ==
- List of Gujarati-language writers
