= Durgashankar Kevalram Shastri =

Gujarati historian (1882-1952)

Durgashankar Kevalram Shastri (Durgāsaṁkara Kevaḷarāma Śāstrī) (January 24, 1882 – 29 November 1952) was a Gujarati historian and Ayurveda practitioner. Shastri was born in a Praśnorā Nāgara Brahmin family; his father was the teacher in the Sanskrit Pāṭhaśāḷā in Gondal, India. From his father he studied Sanskrit, and also studied Gujarati and English literature. In Bombay he was employed by Jhaṁḍu Pharmaceuticals, and his coworkers shared his interest in literature. He authored works on the political and religious history of Gujarat which were published by Gujarati literary institutions. Śukla considers Shastri to be the first Gujarati historian to use systematic historiography to evaluate the quality of sources and view events objectively. Shastri also served as the editor of Ayurveda Vijnana, a monthly journal on Ayurveda.

== Notable works ==
- Purāṇa vivecana. Amadāvāda: Gujarāta Varṇākyulara Sosāīṭī. 1931.
- Vaiṣṇavadharmano saṅkṣipta ītihāsa : enā bhinna bhinna matonā mukhya siddhānto tathā Gujarātamāṃ pracārana nirūpaṇa sāthe. Mumbaī: Phārbasa Gujarātī Sabhā. 1939.
- Aitihāsika saṃśodhana. Mumbaī: Gujarātī Sāhitya Pariṣada. 1941.
- Āyurvedano itihāsa. Amadāvāda: Gujarāta Varnākyulara Sosāyaṭī. 1942.
- Paṇ. Bhagavānalāla Īndrajīnuṃ jīvanacaritra. Amadāvāda: Gujarāta Varnākyulara Sosāyaṭī. 1945.

== See also ==
- List of Gujarati-language writers
