= Harilal Dhruv =

- Born: Harilal Harshadrai Dhruv; 10 May 1856; Bahiyal, Gandhinagar District, (Then Sabarkantha district)
- Died: 19 June 1896 (aged 40)
- Education: Bachelor of Arts, LL.B
- Occupations: Lawyer, poet, editor, indologist and scholar of Sanskrit literature
- Notable work: Kunjavihara and Pravasapushpanjali

Harilal Harshadrai Dhruv (10 May 1856 – 19 June 1896) was a lawyer, poet, editor, indologist and scholar of Sanskrit literature. Educated in Arts and Law, he served as a teacher and later as a judge of Baroda state. He was interested in oriental studies. He wrote poetry and edited some works too.

== Life ==
Dhruv was born in Hindu Nagar Brahmin family in 1856. He completed his Bachelor of Arts in 1873 and LL.B in 1880. Dhruv worked as a teacher from 1881 to 1885. Later he started his law career as a pleader from Surat, and was elevated to post of District and Session Judge of Baroda state. He was sent as a representative of Bharuch in the annual session of Indian National Congress in 1898 by Baroda state.

In 1882, Dhruv founded Prajahita Vardhak Sabha in Surat with Ukabhai Parabhudas. He left by SS. Maria Theresa and attended the eighth International Congress of Orientalists at Stockholm and Christiania as representative of Baroda in 1889 where he was honoured with Doctor of Literature and Arts. He was a member of the Royal Asiatic Society and the Anthropological Society of London. Dhruv received Ph.D. from Berlin University. His brother Keshavlal Dhruv was also author, editor and translator. He died in 1896.

== Works ==
His initial poetry was influenced by medieval Gujarati, medieval Hindi and classical Sanskrit poetry while his later poetry was influenced by English poetry and modernism.

Kunjavihara and Pravasapushpanjali are the collections of poems. Kunjavihara has section of patriotic songs titled Swadesh Bhakti. Aharmimansa, Aryotkarsha Vyayog, Laghu Chanakya, Vasant Vilasija, Prana Gujarati Sahitya Ratnamala are his other works.

=== Bibliography ===
- H. H. Dhruva (1893). Baroda State Delegate at the VIII. International Congress of Orientalists Stockholm (Sweden) and Christiania (Norway) (1889.). Hormusji Jumsedji.

== See also ==
- List of Gujarati-language writers
