= Bahiyal =

- Neighbourhood
- Location in Gujarat, India
- Coordinates: 23.073257°N 72.884802°E
- Country: India
- State: Gujarat
- District: Gandhinagar

Languages
  - Official: Gujarati, Hindi
- Time zone: UTC+5:30 (IST)
- PIN: 382308
- Telephone code: 91-02716
- Vehicle registration: GJ18
- Lok Sabha constituency: Gandhinagar
- Website: gujaratindia.com

Bahiyal is an area located in Gandhinagar, India.
