= Dhvani Desai =

Indian animation filmmaker, curator and poet

- Born: Mumbai
- Education: Elphinstone College; SVKM's NMIMS; Jamnalal Bajaj Institute of Management Studies; Xavier Institute of Communication
- Known for: Animation

Dhvani Desai is an Indian animation filmmaker, curator and poet. She is best known for her artistic animated films Manpasand (the Perfect Match) and Chakravyuh (The Vicious Circle).

== Early life ==
Desai was born in an illustrious family of writers, poets & filmmakers in Mumbai. Her father, Dr Sudhir Desai, is a poet, thinker, and scholar. Her mother, Tarini Desai, is a modern short story writer in Gujarati. Her elder sister, Sanskritirani Desai, is also a Gujarati poet and brother Sanskar a senior Documentary Filmmaker.

== Career ==
Desai holds a Bachelor of Science in Statistics from Elphinstone College, Mumbai, and a Master of Business Administration degree in Finance from the SVKM's NMIMS, Mumbai. Later she earned a post-graduate diploma in Computer Management from Jamnalal Bajaj Institute of Management Studies.

Desai entered the field of animation in 1991. She worked as a trainee at a computer animation studio, where she learned 2D animation. After this, she joined Xavier's Institute of Communication in Mumbai for formal training in 3D animation, before working in two animation studios. Desai then joined the Computer Graphiti (at the time, a pioneer studio in the field of Indian animation) where she worked on numerous ads under guidance of Padmashri Ram Mohan combining 2D animation with live action & 3D, before establishing her own animation studio, Metamorphosis, in Mumbai, which has produced animations and special effects for advertising films.

The Mahatma Gandhi Foundation produced and Desai co-directed with her elder brother, Sanskar, a short animation film, The Mahatma, and other five films which depicted the principles of Gandhiji. The films were selected at the Tehran International Animation Festival in 2001 and at the Mumbai International Film Festival.

The Children's Film Society of India produced and Desai directed an 11-minute long animated film, Manpasand (The Perfect Match). It was officially selected in various festivals in Germany, Czech Republic, Slovakia, Greece, Turkey, Canada, Taiwan and Kenya and won several international Awards. The Panchatantra-based tale used the Vaishnavite Sanjhi art style, a form of stencil art, and took over two years to make, with 42 artists working on it.

Manpasand was nominated at the International Animation Film Festival in Hollywood and selected at several other international film festivals. The film was screened at Hyderabad's The Golden Elephant (the 15th International Children's Film Festival) in November 2007 and was the inaugural film at the Asian Women's Film Festival in New Delhi in 2008.

Desai has also worked on cartoon and animated titles produced by the National Film Development Corporation of India.

Chakravyuh (The Vicious Circle), her film first time on a legal act promoting awareness around India's Right to Information Act (RTI), was produced by the Films Division and released on the 8th Anniversary of the RTI Act in an event organised by the Public Concern for Governance Trust (PCGT), the Indian Merchants' Chamber's (IMC) Anti Corruption Cell, and Bombay Chartered Accountants Society. This film has won several awards and nomination worldwide. Desai has been associated as festival curator for many international film festivals for animation programmes within India and abroad.

== Awards ==
- Gold Remi Award, 41st World Fest Houston, U.S.A. 2008 (for Manpasand — The Perfect Match)
- Bronze World Medal 2008 New York Film Festival
- Silver Award (Best Short Fiction of a Director), Indian Documentary Producer's Association, 2007
- Prix Danube Festival award, Slovakia 2008
- Award for Best Practices in RTI, DOPT, Government of India and Yashada, 2014
- Award from Ministry of Personnel, Public Grievances and Pensions, Govt of India, 2015
- Most Popular Film Award, Mumbai International Film Festival, 2014

== Honours and achievements ==
- Jury at 66th National Film Awards 2019 in the Non-Feature Category
- Jury at Bangalore International Film Festival 2020 BIFFES
- Jury at Pune International Film Festival PIFF 2016 in the Animation Category
- Grand Jury at New York Festivals 2014
- Jury at Third Eye Asian Film Festival 2015
- Jury at International Film Festival of India IFFI 2022

She has served as Jury in several international film festivals in India and abroad.
