= Endla, Rajasthan =

Endla Endlawas, Jooni Endla
- village
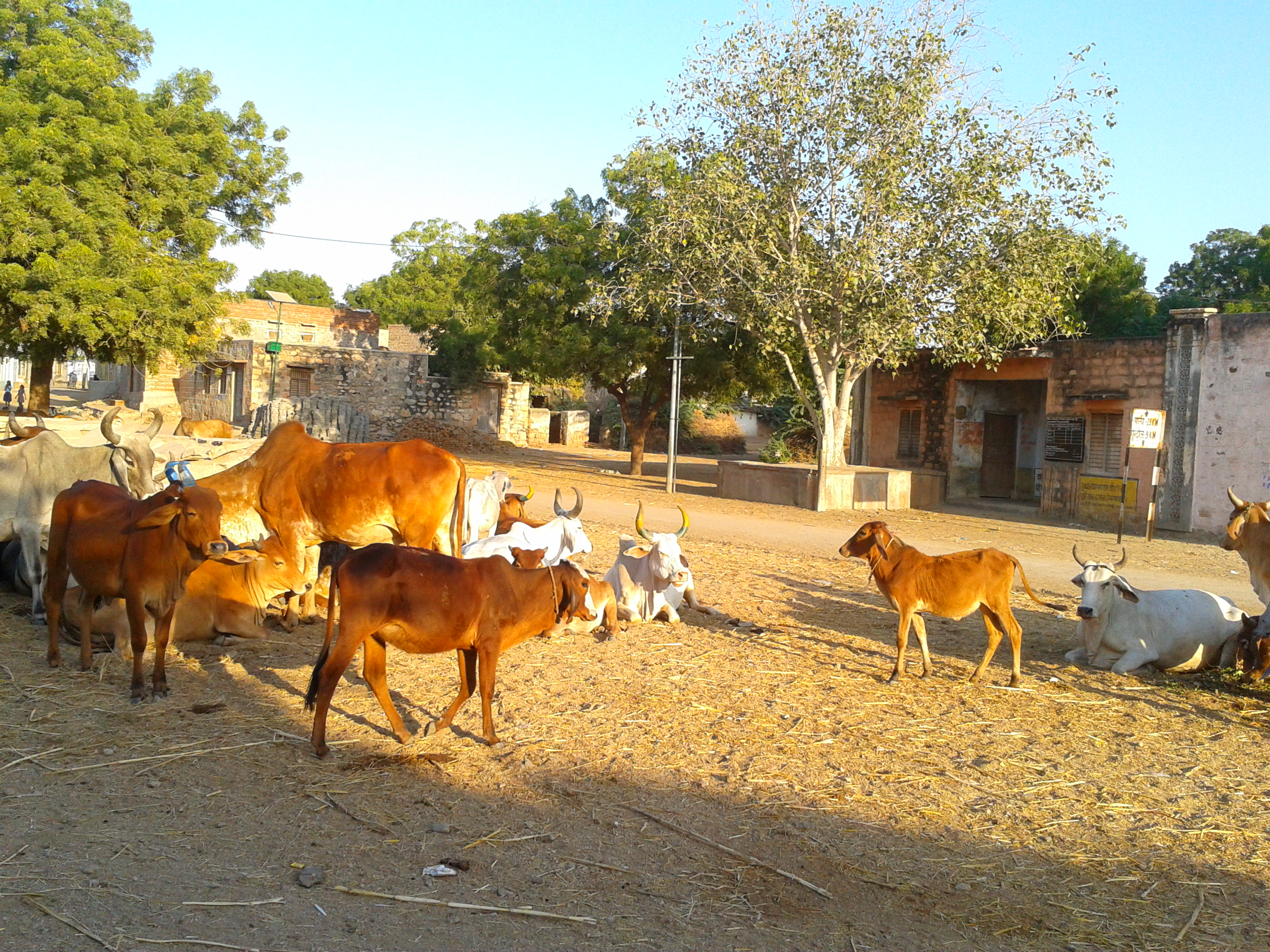
- Endla

- Location in Rajasthan, India Endla (India)
- Coordinates: 25.549721°N 73.250999°E
- Country: India
- State: Rajasthan
- District: Pali
- Talukas: Pali

Government
  - Body: Gram Panchayat

Languages
  - Official: Marwari, Hindi
- Time zone: UTC+5:30 (IST)
- PIN: 306422
- Telephone code: 91 2932
- ISO 3166 code: RJ-IN
- Vehicle registration: RJ-22
- Lok Sabha constituency: Pali (Lok Sabha constituency)
- Vidhan Sabha constituency: Sumerpur
- Civic agency: Gram Panchayat

Endla is a small village in Pali district of Rajasthan in Northern India. It is 3 kilometres (1.9 mi) away from National Highway 62, near Guda Endla village. Endla village has divided into two revenue villages: Endlawas and Jooni Endla. Some of revenue documents consider Endla (Endlawas & Jooni Endla) as a Gura Endla - 2 revenue village.

Shri Mangilal Chimnoba Choudhary's Bera (Balawala) is midpoint of this village, which has divided this village into two revenue villages. So this village has three names: Endla, Endlawas and Jooni Endla, but most commonly preferred name is Endla . Some of official documents preferred name for this place is Endla. The village Endla has two sub localities Bhaton Ka Dhana (Bhaton ki Dhani) & Meghwalon Ki Dhani. This village is under Pali Lok Sabha and Sumerpur Vidhan Sabha constituencies respectively.

== Landmarks ==
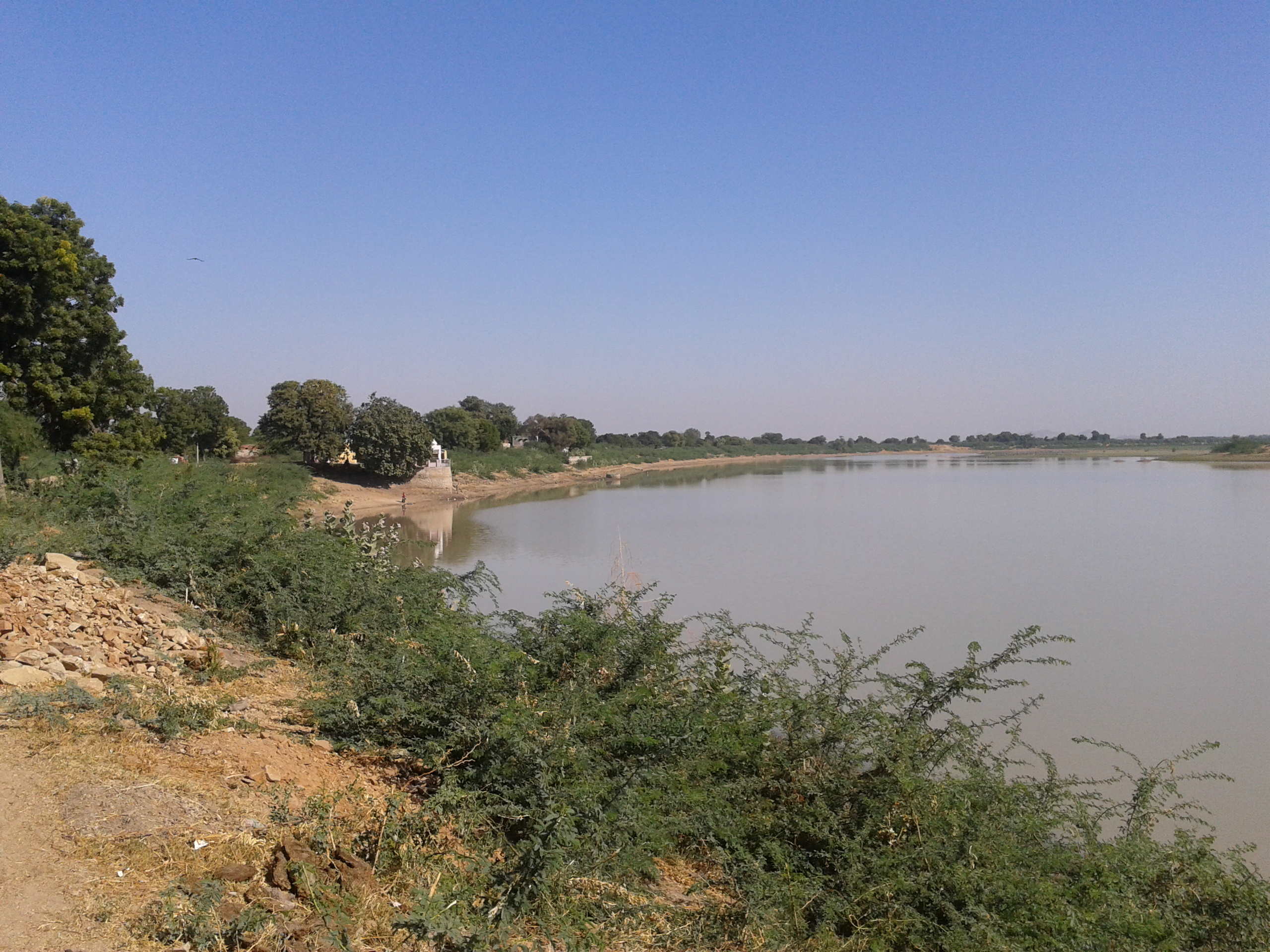
Endla Dam

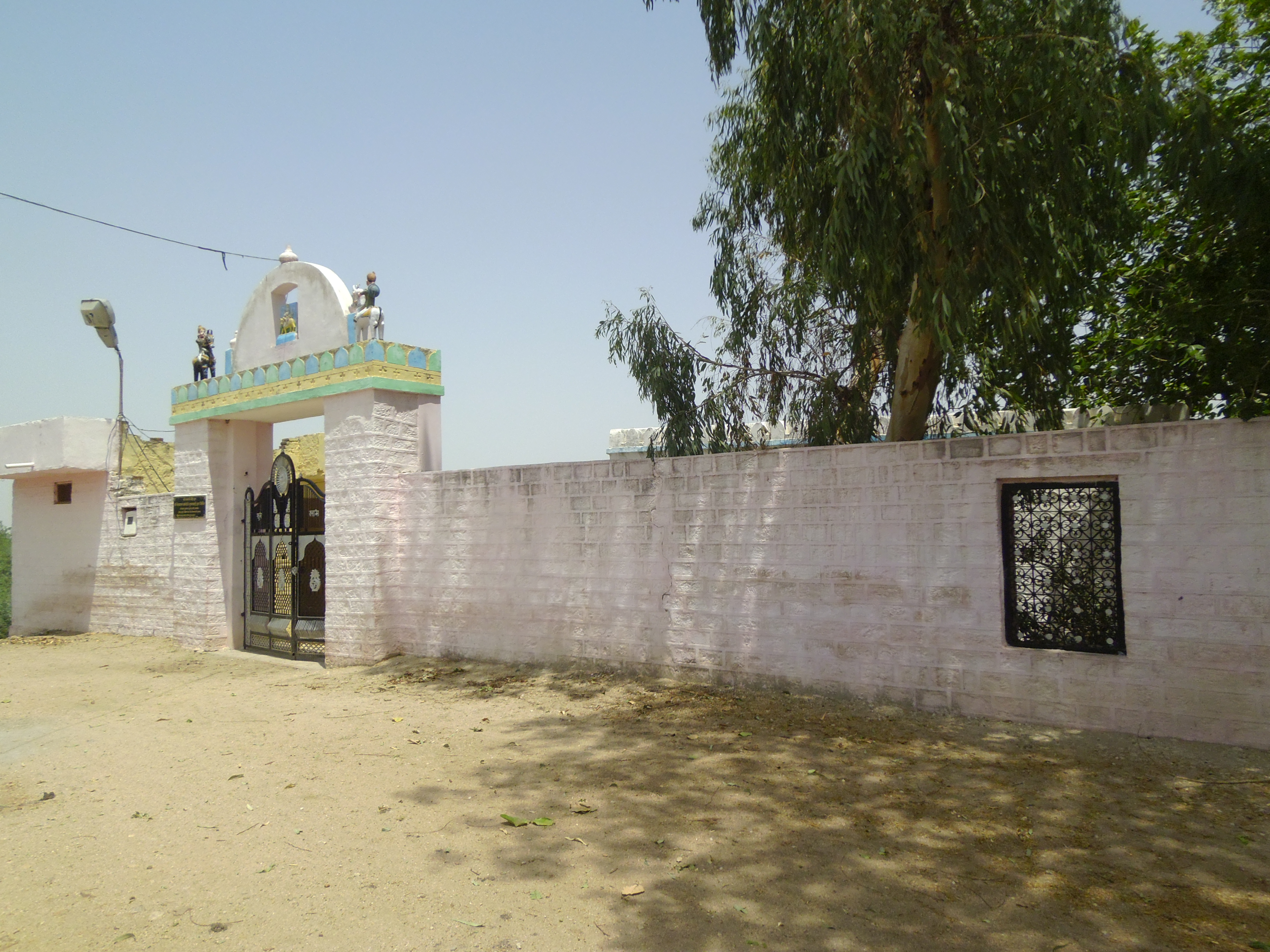
Mamaji Mandir

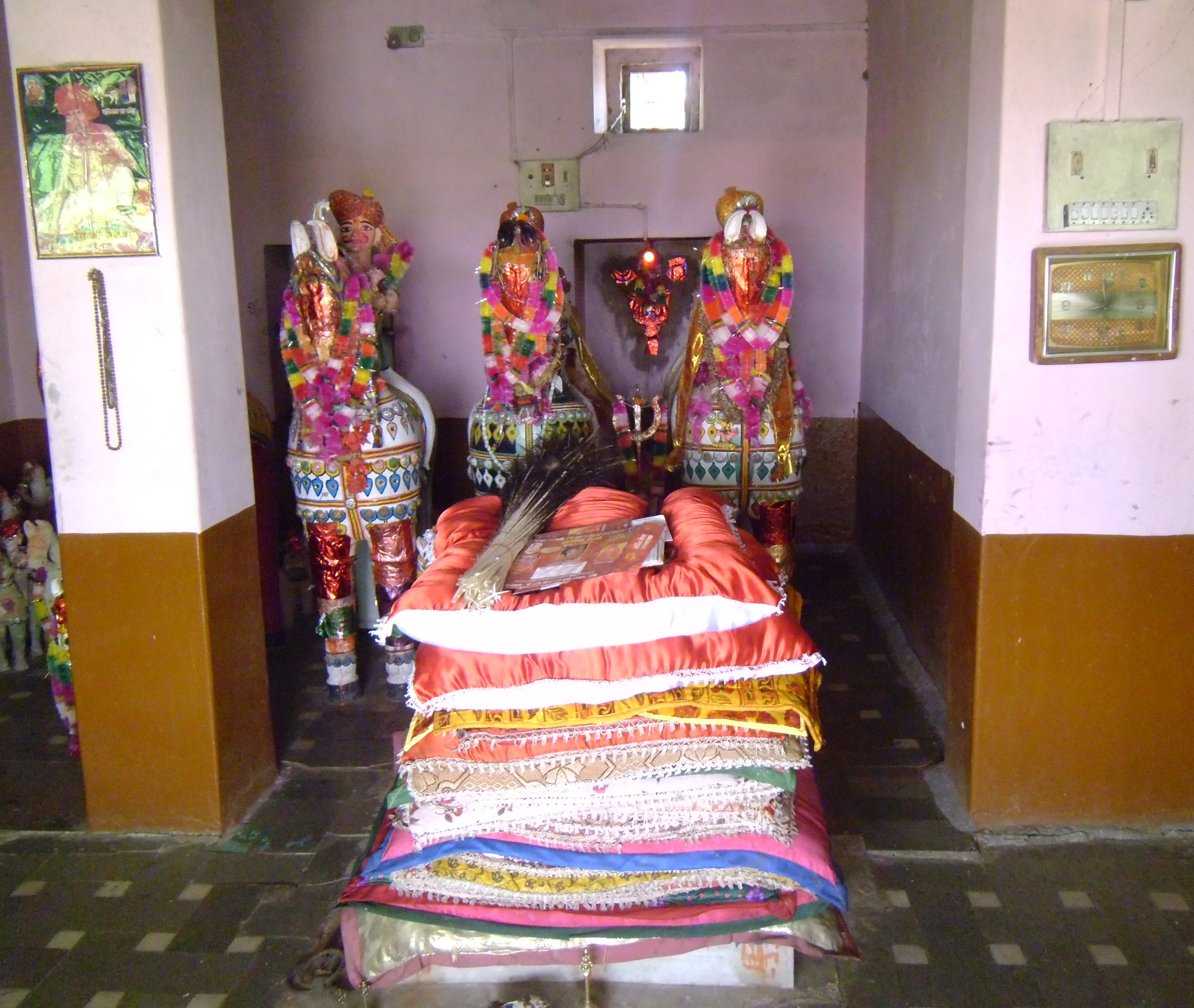
Mamaji Maharaj

This village is known for the Endla Dam. It has the temple of Mamaji (lok devta).

== Economy ==
Most of population of this village depends on agriculture for their livelihood.

== Demographics ==
The village's population is dominated by Charan the jagirdar of village, रजपुत (not rajput) Choudhary, Meghwal (Rarbara & Goyal), Rabari, Bhat, Vaishnav castes.

== Transport ==
Endla is well connected with National Highway 62 and there is transportation available to reach the district headquarter Pali and Krishi Anaaj mandi Sumerpur.

== Education ==
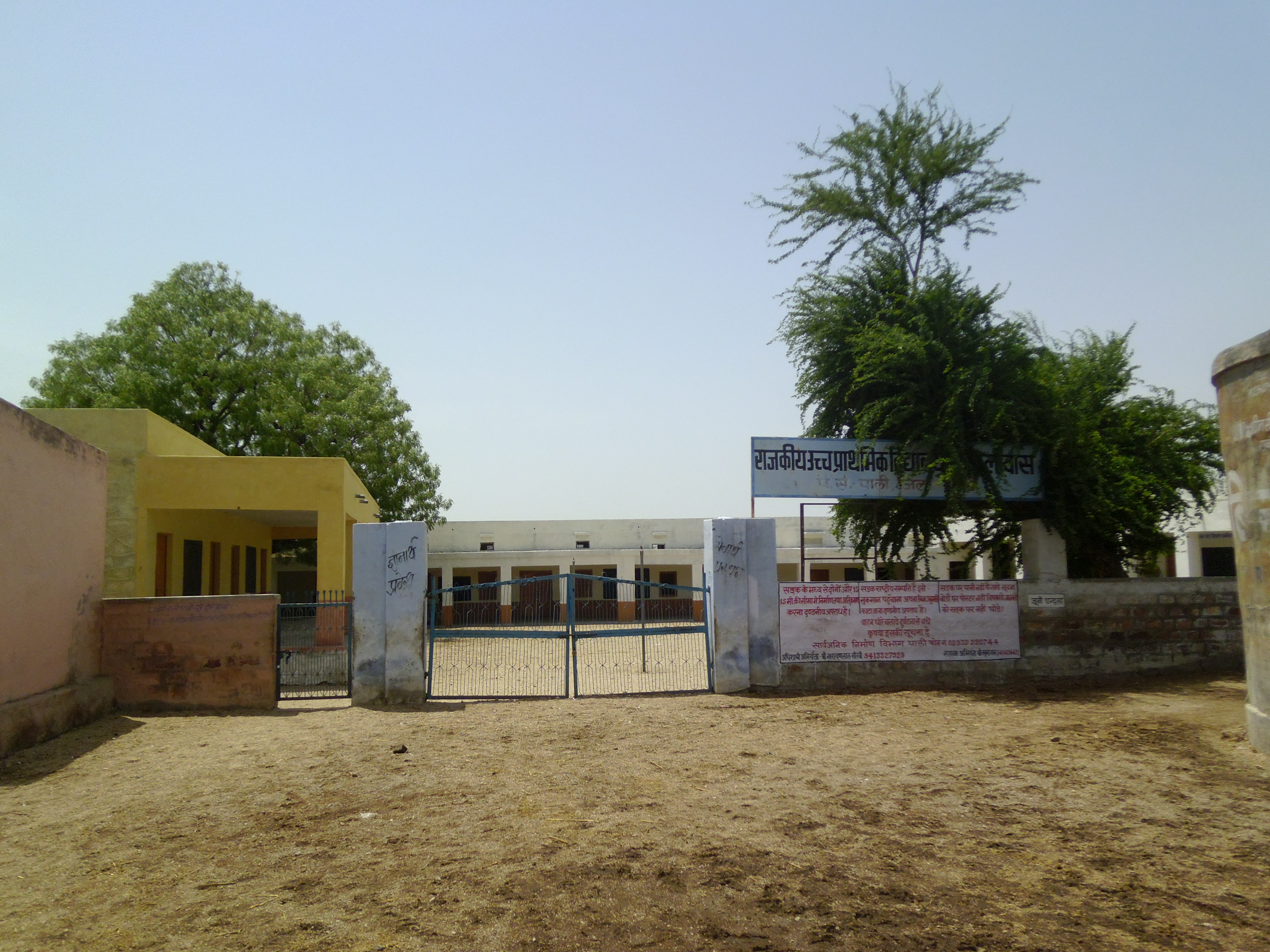
School Building Endla

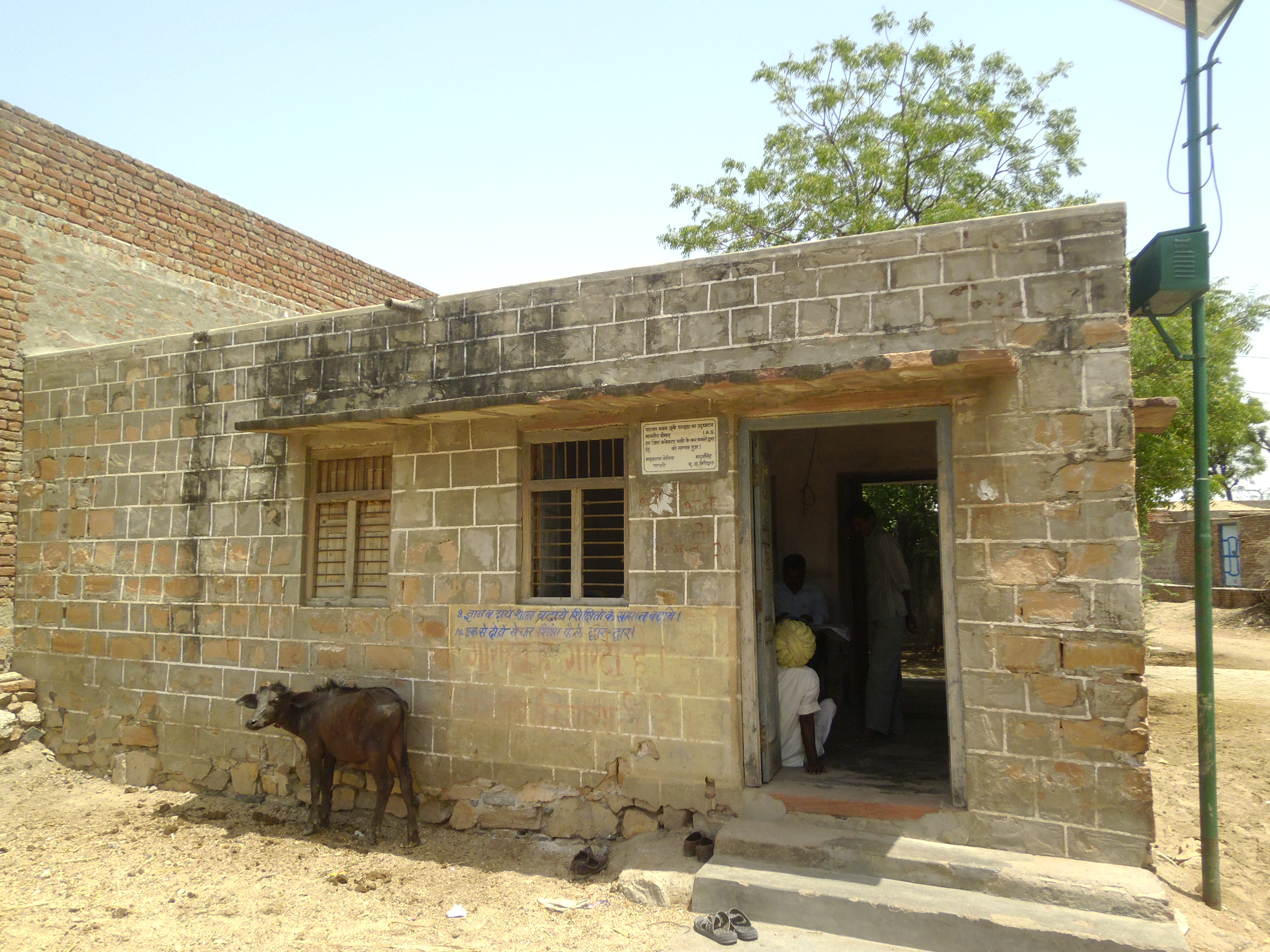
Revenue Office/Patwar Office

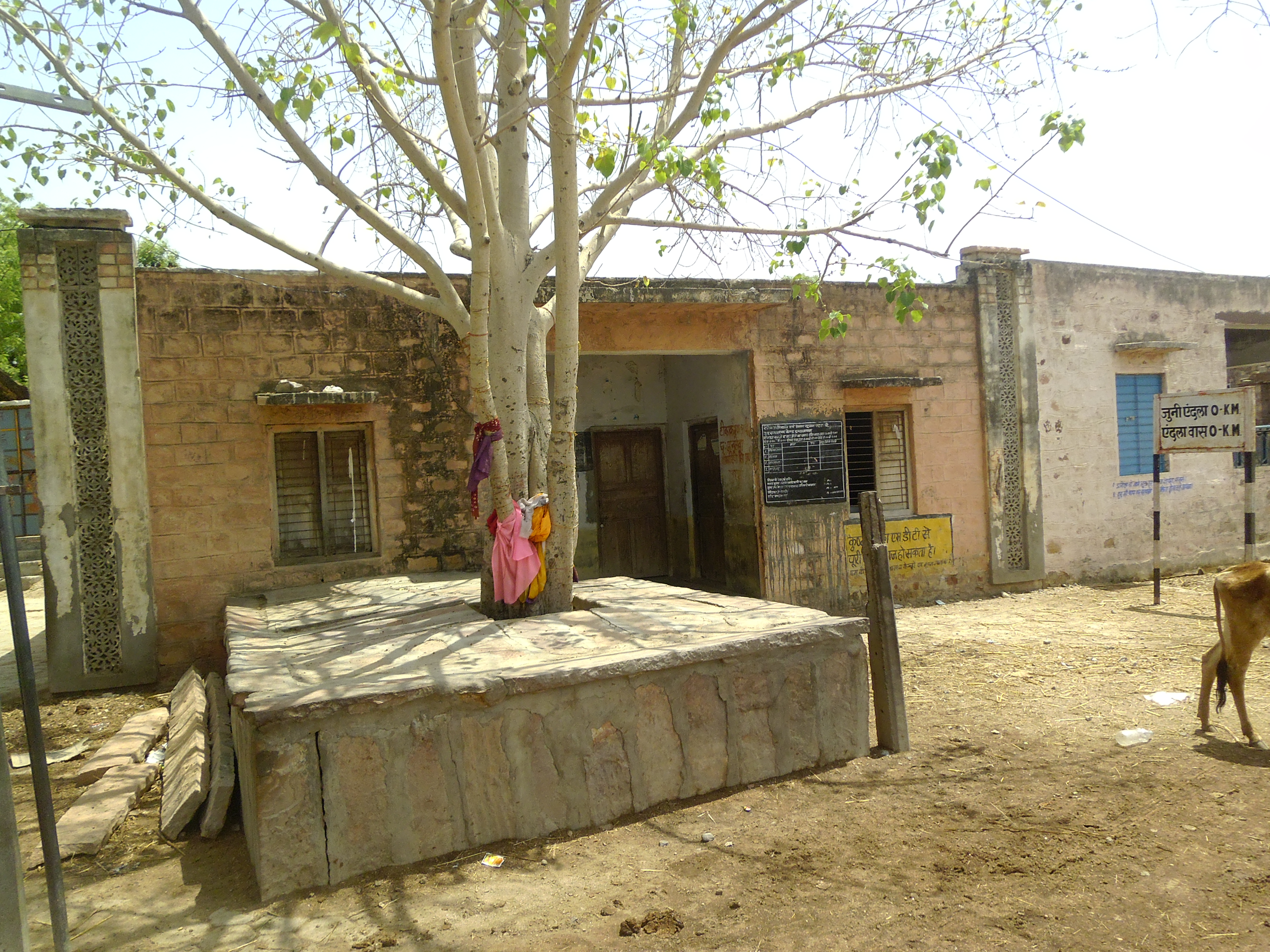
Primary Health Centre

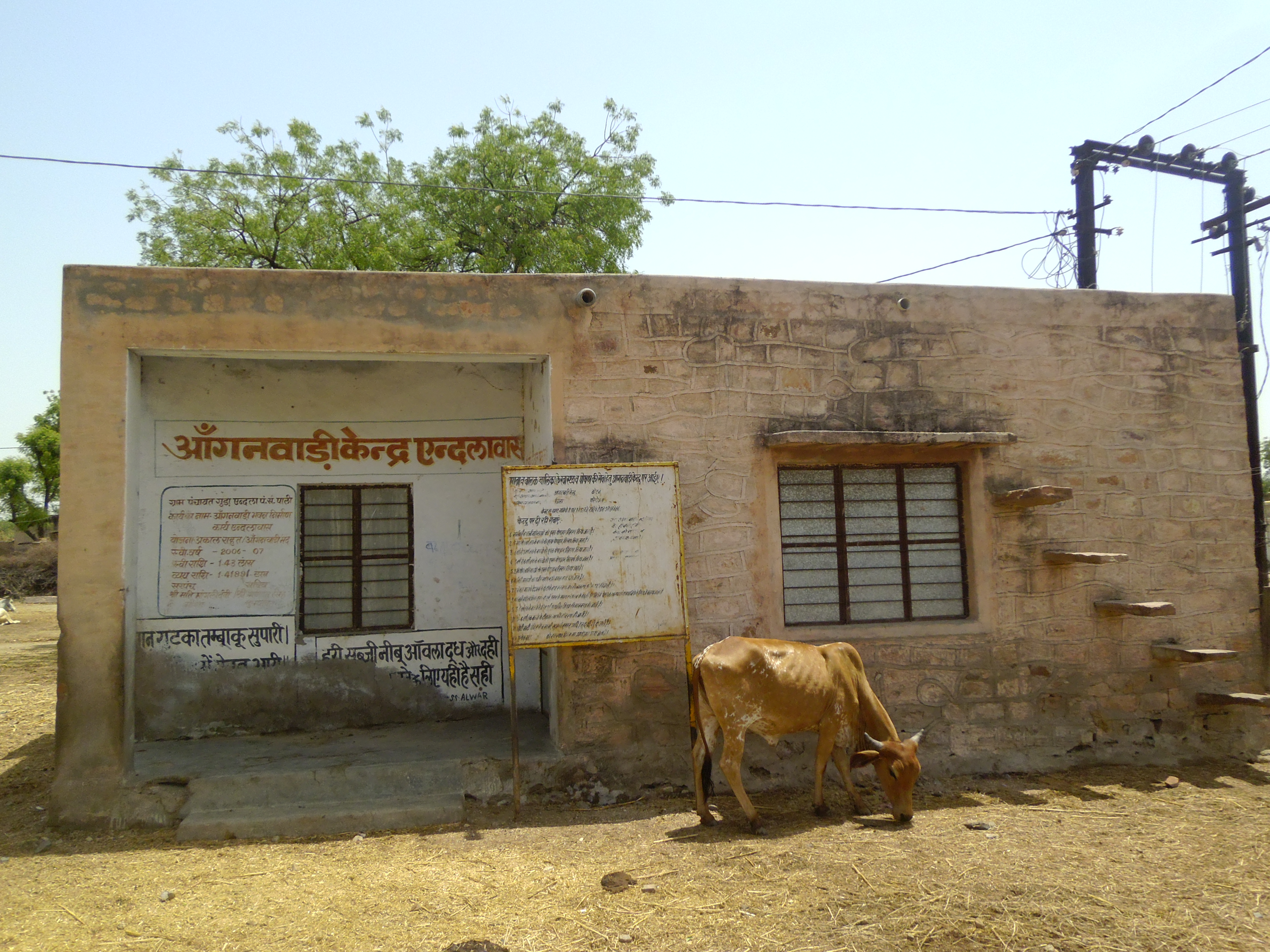
Anganwadi Kendra

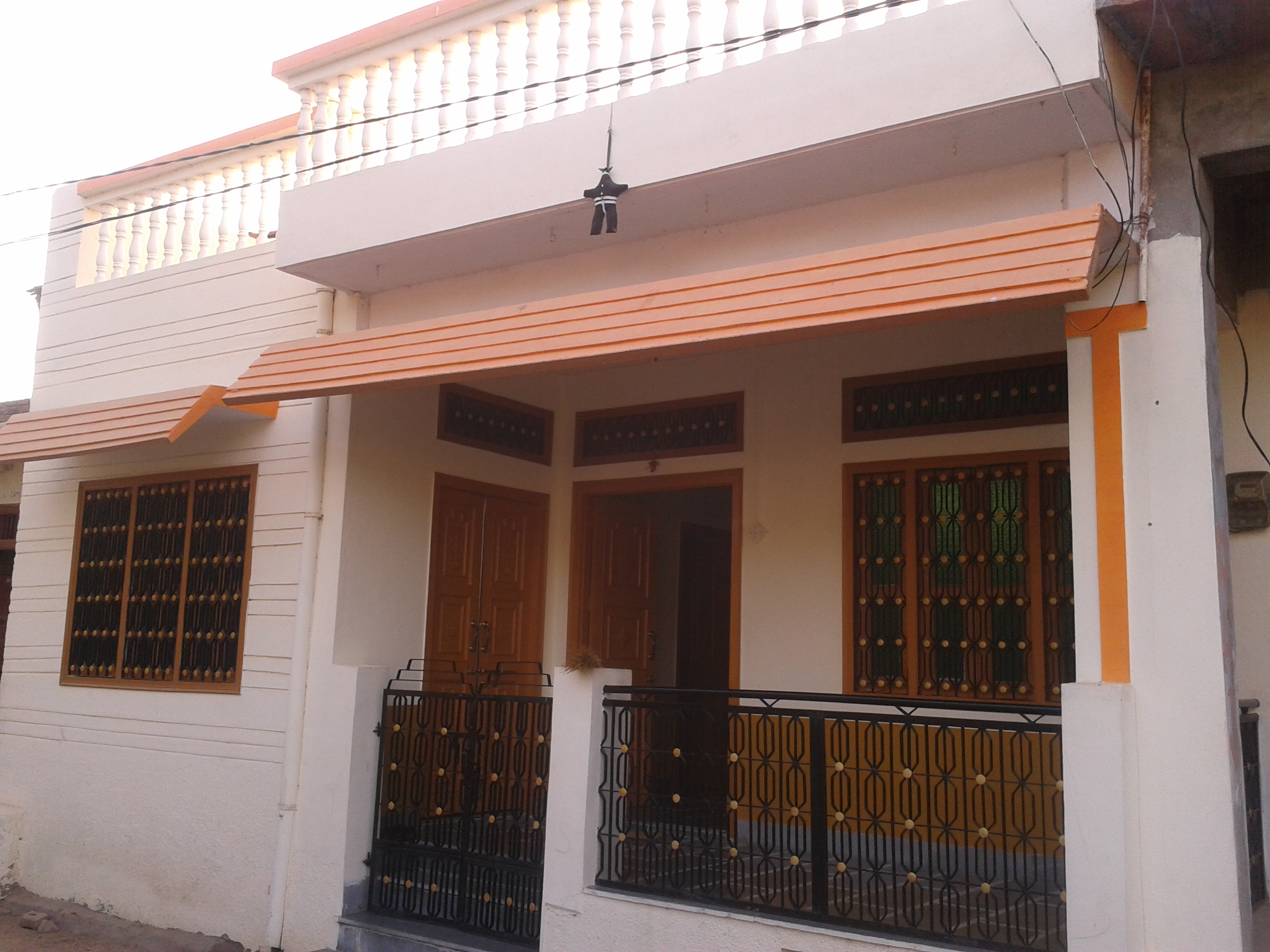
Village House Endla.

Currently there are one school (Upper Primary School), one Revenue Office, one Primary Health Centre and one Anganwadi Kendra running to serve the society.

== See also ==
- Pali, Rajasthan
