= Keshavlal Dhruv =

Gujarati-language scholar and critic (1859–1938)

Dewan Bahadur Keshavlal Harshadrai Dhruv
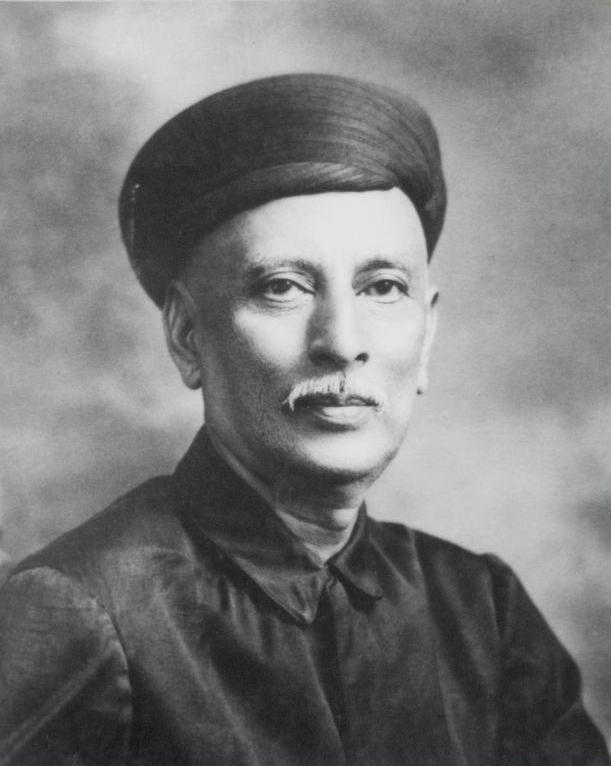
- Born: Keshavlal Harshadrai Dhruv; 17 October 1859; Bahiyel, Dehgam, Gujarat
- Died: 13 March 1938 (aged 78)
- Education: Bachelor of Arts
- Occupations: philologist, critic, editor
- Spouse: Jasvidya Dhruv.
- Children: Sarojini, Vilochan.
- Relatives: Harilal Dhruv (brother)
- Writing career
- Language: Gujarati
- Notable works: Prachin Gurjar Kavyo (1927); Sahitya ane Vivechan (1939, 1941)

Dewan Bahadur Keshavlal Harshadrai Dhruv (17 October 1859 – 13 March 1938), also spelt as Keshavlal Harshad Dhruva and known by his pen name Vanmali, was a research scholar, philologist, critic, editor of Middle and Old Gujarati works, and translator of Sanskrit classic poetry and plays from India. He was a professor of Gujarati and taught at Gujarat College. He headed several literary organizations.

== Life ==
Keshavlal was born on 17 October 1859 in Bahiyel near Dehgam in Gujarat, India. He completed matriculation in 1876 and Bachelor of Arts in 1882. He taught at Premchand Raichand Training College in Ahmedabad for a brief period. Later he joined Ranchhodlal Chotalal High School and was appointed a Headmaster in 1908. He retired from there in 1915 and joined Gujarat College as the professor of Gujarati language and literature. He retired from there in 1934. He headed Gujarat Vidya Sabha from 1920 to 1938. His essay on philology at the first Gujarati Sahitya Parishad, held in 1905, won him praise. He also headed the second Gujarati Sahitya Parishad, held in 1907. His brother Harilal Dhruv was a lawyer who authored poetry and edited several books. Keshavlal died on 13 March 1938.

== Works ==
Keshavlal started writing essays on old Sanskrit works such as Malayas of Mudrarakshasha and Age of Vishakhadatta when he was 28 years old.

His research work on literature and criticism is collected in two volumes of Sahitya ane Vivechan (1939, 1941). His work on prosody is well known. His five lectures that are part of the Vasanji Madhavji Thakkar Lectures held by the University of Bombay in 1930-31 are collected in Padyarachna ni Aitihasik Alochana (1932). They discuss metres of vernacular languages and their evolution from Apabramsha, Prakrit, and Vedic metres.

Keshavlal has written essays and notes on Sanskrit and medieval Gujarati poets, playwrights, and works. He has edited works of several medieval poets and authors, including a translation of Kadambari by Bhalan (1916, 1927), Anubhavbindu of Akha Bhagat (1932), and Harishchandrakhyan of Ratnahas (1927). He compiled 15th-century Gujarati poems under the title Pandarma Shatakna Prachin Gurjar Kavyo (1927).

He translated several Sanskrit plays and poetry into Gujarati. His translated Sanskrit poetry includes Amaru Shataka (1892), Geetgovind (1895), and Chhayaghatakarpar (1902). He translated several plays by the early Sanskrit playwright Bhāsa, including Pratijna-Yaugandharayana (1915), Swapnavāsavadatta (1917), Madhyamavyayoga (1920), and Pratima-nataka (1928). He also translated Vishakhadatta's Mudrarakshasa as Mel ni Mudrika (1889), Harsha's Priyadarsika as Vindhyavan ni Kanyaka (1916), and Kalidasa's Vikramōrvaśīyam as Parakram ni Prasadi (1915).
