= Sanskritirani Desai =

Indian Gujarati poet

- Born: 1 October 1958 (age 67); Baroda, Bombay State (now Vadodara, Gujarat), India
- Occupation: Poet
- Notable work: Suryo Ja Suryo (1993)
- Parent(s): Sudhir Desai, Tarini Desai
- Relatives: Dhvani Desai, Sanskar Desai

Sanskritirani Desai is Gujarati poet from India.

== Life ==
Sanskritirani was born in Baroda (now Vadodara) on 1 October 1958 to Sudhir Desai and Tarini Desai who were Gujarati writers. Her sister Dhvani Desai is also poet and filmmaker. She studied for an M. A. in Statistics, M. B. A. in Finance and Diploma in Management Studies. She works as the General Manager in the Information Technology Department of a Public Limited Company. She knows Gujarati, Hindi, English, Marathi, Bengali, Sanskrit and Russian languages. She is a painter, swimmer, dancer as well as karateka.

== Works ==
Her first poetry collection Suryo Ja Suryo (1993) included unique modern poems on the sun and its different forms. It received critical acclaim. Sapna Vatemarguo is her other poetry collection. She has translated several poems from Russian into Gujarati and English.

== Awards ==
Her Suryo Ja Suryo received several awards such as Takhtasinh Parmar Prize (1992–93) and Phanishwarnath Renu Sahitya Award. She has also received two prizes from Gujarati Sahitya Parishad, Gira Gurjari Award, Dinkar Shah Kavi 'Jay' Prize.

== See also ==
- List of Gujarati-language writers
