= Vrajlal Shastri =

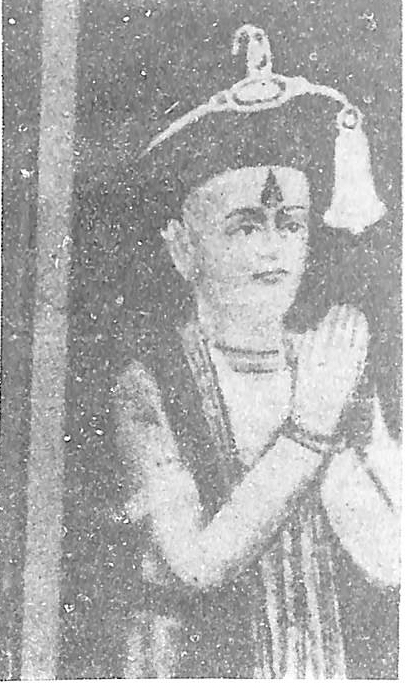
- Born: Vrajlal Kalidas Shastri; 26 November 1825; Malataj, Petlad, Gujarat
- Died: 14 November 1892 (aged 66)
- Occupations: philologist, poet, scholar, translator
- Writing career
- Language: Gujarati
- Notable works: Gujarati Bhashano Itihas (1866); Utsargmala (1870); Dhatusangrah (1870); Gurjar Bhasha Prakash (1892)

Vrajlal Kalidas Shastri (26 November 1825 – 14 November 1892) was a pioneer of philology in Gujarati language and writer who wrote books on Gujarati language.

== Life ==
He was born on 26 November 1825 in Malataj, a village in Petlad, Gujarat. He took his primary education in his village Malataj. He had studied Sanskrit poetry and grammar in Sanskrit pathshalas. He also studied Prakrit grammar and literature. He taught Sanskrit at Jain Mandir, Ahmedabad. Due to Jain religious books, he became familiar with Prakrit-Pali, Apabhramsa, Ardha Magadhi so he wrote books on philology of Gujarati. He worked with Gujarat Vernacular Society and Dharma Sabha and edited their two journals, Buddhiprakash and Dharmaprakash. He had a long career of twenty five years as a researcher and scholar.

He died on 14 November 1892.

== Works ==
He had written fifteen books. His books on Gujarati language include Gujarati Bhashano Itihas (1866), Utsargmala (1870), Gurjar Bhasha Prakash (1892). His Utsargama is a pioneer work in philology of Gujarati. He also compiled, with J. V. S. Taylor, Dhatusangraha (1870), an etymological dictionary of Gujarati roots.

His Rasganga is a work on poetics. Chandrahas Akhyana and Muktamala are his other creative works. Yagnavalkyacharit is a biography of sage Yajnavalkya in a dialogue form which is an only biography in such form in Gujarati. Hitopadesh Shabdartha (1870) and Vaisheshik Tarksaar (1898; posthumously) are also his significant works.
