= Chanod, Valsad =

Chanod
- Census town
- Location in Gujarat, India Chanod (India)
- Coordinates: 20.3269°N 72.90901°E
- Country: India
- State: Gujarat
- District: Valsad

Population (2001)
  - Total: 11,958

Languages
  - Official: Gujarati, Hindi
- Time zone: UTC+5:30 (IST)
- Vehicle registration: GJ
- Website: gujaratindia.com

Chanod is a census town in Valsad district in the state of Gujarat, India. This town falls under the Pardi taluka and has a population of over 11,958 people (as per the 2001 census).

== Demographics ==
At the 2001 Indian census, Chanod had a population of 31,252. Males constituted 61% of the population and females 39%. Chanod had an average literacy rate of 72%, higher than the national average of 59.5%; with male literacy of 80% and female literacy of 60%. 16% of the population were under 6 years of age.
