= Petlad =

- Town
- Location in Gujarat, India Petlad (India)
- Coordinates: 22.47°N 72.8°E
- Country: India
- State: Gujarat
- District: Anand
- Municipality Established: 1876
- Elevation: 30 m (98 ft)

Population (2011)
  - Total: 227,031
- Time zone: UTC+5:30 (IST)
- Postal code: 388450
- Vehicle registration: GJ
- Website: gujaratindia.com

Petlad is a Town and a municipality "Taluka" in Anand district in the Gujarat state of India. Petlad was founded and ruled by Koli Chieftain Patal Khant .

== Education ==
- R. K. Parikh Arts & Science College
- New Education High School(NEHS)
- N.K High School
- The Western English Medium School (TWEMS)
- R. K. High School
- Surya International School
- St. Mary's High School
- Convent of Jesus and Mary School
- SD pathan High School

== Notable people ==
- Yash Shah - Indian Yogi & Contortionist.
