= Rathore dynasty =

North Indian dynasty

Rathore dynasty House of Marwar
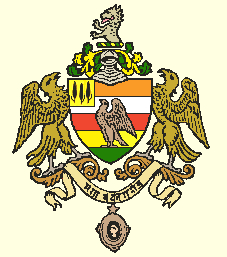
- Coat of arms

- Flag of Kingdom of Marwar
- Parent house: Gahadavala dynasty or Rashtrakuta dynasty
- Country: States ruled by Rathores: Marwar; Bikaner; Ratlam; Kishangarh; Jhabua; Sitamau; Sailana; Alirajpur; Idar; Saraikela; Kharsawan; Jubbal; Vijaynagar; Jobat; Valasna; Malpur
- Founded: 1226; 800 years ago
- Founder: Rao Siha
- Current head: Gaj Singh
- Final ruler: Hanwant Singh
- Titles: Traditional titles: Maharaja of Marwar; Maharaja of Bikaner; Maharaja of Ratlam; Raja of Kishangarh; Raja of Jhabua; Raja of Sitamau; Raja of Sailana; Rana of Jobat; Rao of Alirajpur; Rao of Idar; Rao of Vijaynagar; Rao of Malpur; Kunwar of Saraikela; Thakur of Kharsawan; Thakur of Jubbal; Thakur of Valasna; Subahdar of Gujarat; Subahdar of Lahore; Subahdar of Nagaur
- Connected families: Beenkar family
- Estates: Mehrangarh; Junagarh Fort; Roopangarh Fort; Umaid Bhawan Palace; Lalgarh Palace; Jubbal Palace

The Rathore dynasty is an Indian dynasty belonging to the Rathore clan of Rajputs that has historically ruled over parts of Rajasthan, Gujarat, Madhya Pradesh and Jharkhand. (Note: Alternative spellings include Rathor.) The Rathores trace their ancestry from the Suryavamsha (Solar dynasty) and to the Rashtrakutas and later to the Gahadavalas of Kannauj, migrating to Marwar region of Rajasthan after the fall of Kannauj.

== Origins ==
=== Rashtrakuta origin ===
A section of some historians argue for a Rashtrakuta origin. Branches of Rashtrakutas had migrated to Western Rajasthan as early as the late tenth century. Multiple inscriptions of Rathauras have been located in and around Marwar dating from the tenth to thirteenth century, indicating that the Rathores may have emerged from one of the Rashtrakuta branches.

=== Bardic origins ===
Muhnot Nainsi, employed by the Rathores of Marwar, chronicled Nainsi ri Khyat, a bardic genealogical history of the Rajputs in western Rajasthan c. 1660; one of the oldest extant historical records of the region, the Khyata collated information from existing oral literature, genealogies and administrative sources in a chronological fashion. (Note: Nainsi's was the Chief Revenue Officer of Jaswant Singh I, during the time of compilation and his' is the oldest Khyat of the region. Other written sources include the much formal "Marvar Ri Parganam Ri Vigat", compiled by Nainsi. Both does not record any entry later than 1666, his last year in service.) (Note: It may not be assumed that prior to Nainsi, the literary worlds of Thar were barren. A vast corpus of literature — vamsavalis, bat, and pidhavali — were maintained and transmitted across centuries, prim. in oral forms, by specialists from lowers castes. Even the relatively newer forms of Khyat or Vigat were probably there for about a century before Nainsi.) Nainsi had noted of the Rathores to have originated from Kannauj before migrating to Marwar.

British indologist V. A. Smith theorized that the Rathores and Bundelas are an offshoot of the Gahadavala dynasty. Roma Niyogi considers this claim to be of a later origin.

==== Accuracy ====
These bardic claims of descent have been since deemed to be largely ahistorical by Ziegler. (Note: An inscription in Bithoor commemorates the death of one Siho in 1273 CE, noting him to be the son of Set Kanwar; there is no mention of any Gahadavala descent. Rao Jaitsi ro Chhand, a Charan poetry composed about a century earlier in 1535 had started with Salkha as the first of Rathores.) Ziegler notes the theme of migrations to be common across Rajput genealogies; a construct, borrowed from literary canon of other regions. Later genealogies of Rathores went as far as to derive origin from Gods of the Hindu pantheon — Indra, Narayana et al. (Note: "Rathodam Ri Vamsavali", edited out of three undated manuscripts (prob. 18th c.), mentions the earliest ancestor of Rathores to be one Raja Rastevswar, a Suryavanshi Rajput in the Treta Yuga. He took birth from his father's spine ("ratho") and with the blessings of Rsi Gotam, established a sovereign state from Kannauj. Even Rama, from the Dyapara Yuga, is noted to be a Rathore!)

== History ==
=== Early history ===
The first Rathore chieftain was kunwar Siha Setramot, grandson of the last Gahadavala king Jayachandra. (Note: For context of production (and circulation), see section on history.) Raja Setram abdicated the throne of Kanauj to become an ascetic but got embroiled in a royal rivalry and eventually married the daughter of a Gujarati ruler, who birthed him many sons, siha was younger and had no claim to throne so he went on his own expedition of becoming a ruler. Siha setramot went on to establish his kingdom in Pali on the invitation of local paliwal Brahmins who were oppressed by local mer plunders, he established himself in a place named khor in pali by defeating an oppressive tribal lord named Kanha Mer, and he adopted Rao title presented to him by the Feudal lord of sewari who was a Rao chieftain ruling under parmar kingdom of abu. Other contemporary sources claim the same descent and construct slightly variable narratives about migration from Kanauj: Setramot fled the Ghurid Sultanate to Marwar and established the first Rathore polity. The Bithoor inscription provides the date of Siha's death in 1273 CE and calls him the son of Set Kunwar; however, it does not claim any Gaharwal origin. (Note: An inscription in Bithoor commemorates the death of one Siho in 1273 CE, noting him to be the son of Set Kanwar; there is no mention of any Gahadavala descent. Rao Jaitsi ro Chhand, a Charan poetry composed about a century earlier in 1535 had started with Salkha as the first of Rathores.)

Under Rao siha’s son Asthan's regime, and that of his successor-rulers, the Rathore territories significantly expanded courtesy confrontations and diplomatic negotiations with other pastoral groups; the primary base shifted multiple times. (Note: After Asthan, came in order — Raipal, Kanhadde, Jalhansi, Chhada, Teedo, Salkha, Malo, Chunda, and Rinmal. A fair share of internecine rivalry was present since Malo's ascension to the throne.) Marital alliances with any warrior-group operating out of Thar were especially favored and they were welcome to be inducted in the Rathore fold. (Note: Ziegler doubts that these rulers (till Raso/Chunda) were extrapolated from popular memory and incorporated into Rathore genealogy; very little exists in the form of historical evidence. David Henige also points out that Nainsi accommodates 10 kings within a span of 74 years, which is quite improbable unless plagued with telescoping.) Multiple new Rathore branches seem to have split out in these spans. (Note: All of these branches — Sindhal, Uhar, Petar, Mulu etc. — reigned over different areas of Marwar.)

The precise accuracy of events which allegedly occurred across these spans is questionable and may not be relied upon except for a generic reconstruction.

=== Sovereignty ===
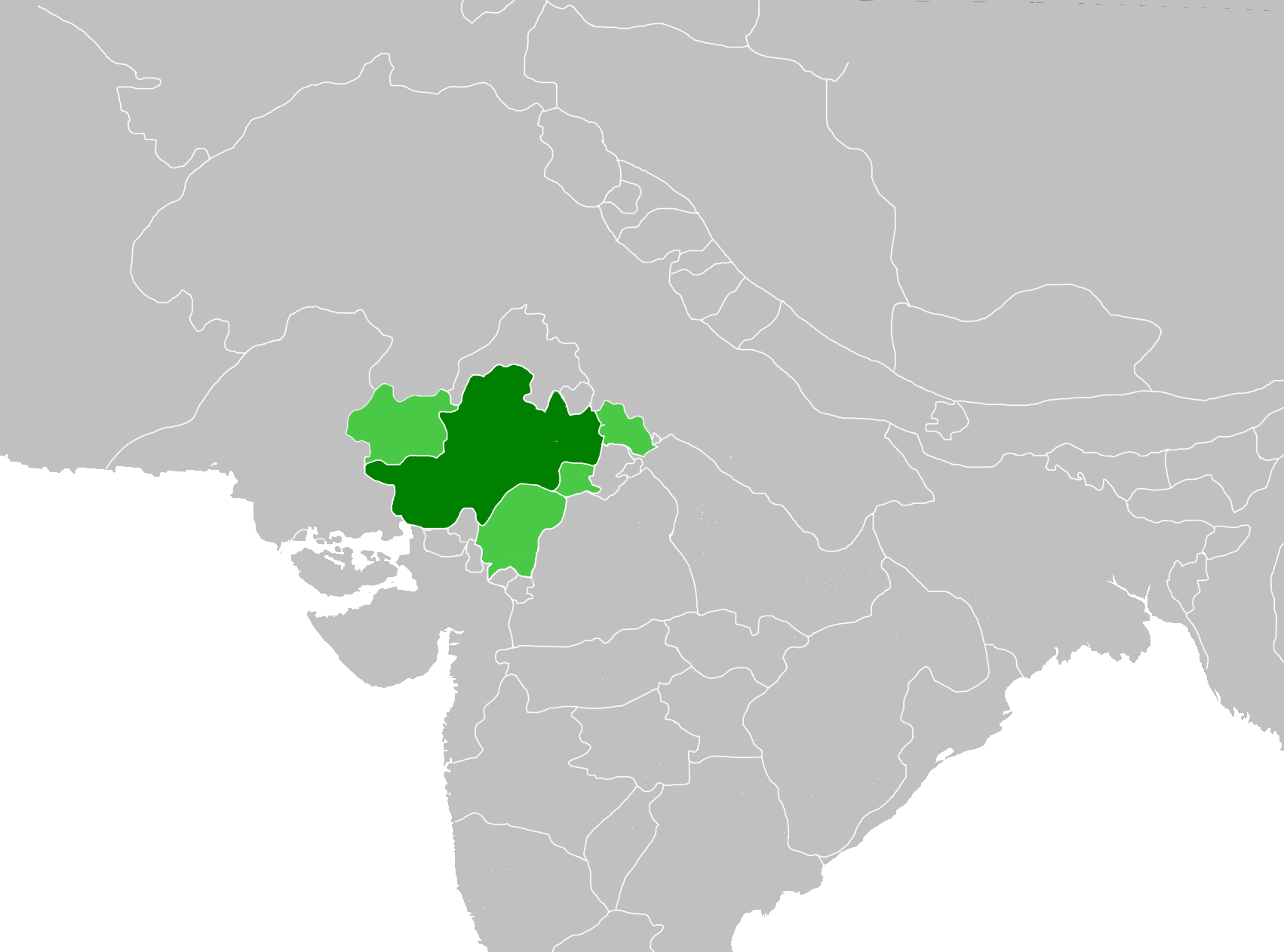
map of the Kingdom of Marwar in 1539

Rao Chunda, who was ninth in descent from Asthan, married a Pratihara princess and was gifted the territory of Mandore as a dowry by the Pratihara clan. In return Chunda promised to defend Mandore against the Tughlaq Empire. Mandore thus became the new capital of the Rathore clan, c. 1400. This prompted a significant sociopolitical shift: the hitherto nomadic lifestyle frequented with cattle raids etc. would gradually give way to landed aristocracy. (Note: The earlier periods are referred to in Rajput histories as period of "Vikhau". Contemporary anxieties of caste-pollution and unstable hierarchy are projected back onto these spans.) His son Ranmal was assassinated in 1438; Marwar was annexed by Sisodias whilst other parts were captured by Delhi Sultanate. (Note: Ziegler notes that the chronicles become reasonably reliable since mid-fifteenth century and is supported by epigraphical evidence. There is a strong probability that Nainsi copied off some parts from much older sources without attribution. However, Nainsi did add anachronistic elements to his narratives.)

In 1453, Rao Jodha regained Marwar, and expanded his territories by entering into multiple alliances with fellow Rajputs; the Jodha line was established with his consecration of a new capital at Jodhpur. Rao Jodha was successful in annexing several territories from the Delhi Sultanate, due to which the Rathores of Marwar became the most powerful kingdom in Rajputana during his reign. Among his sons, Rao Bika found a new state in Bikaner in 1465; he and his successors would go on to expand territories therefrom, adopting similar tactics. This Bikawat branch became the new bearer of Rathore legacy, even bringing Gahdavala-time emblems and heirlooms from Marwar. Another of Jodha's sons Rao Varsingh found a new state at Merto in 1462, establishing the Mertiyo branch.

Rao Maldeo's regime (1532-1562) harbored another significant shift from clannish rule to monarchy; Malde forced his distant relatives, who conquered new territories, to submit to him or else be deprived of gains. Bikaner was raided, too. Large palaces were constructed and fortifications were committed to, in what signaled the effective end of pastoral lifestyle. By mid-sixteenth century, the Rathors had a firm hold over entire Rajasthan.

All these while, multiple matrimonial and military alliances with local Islamic kingdoms; the Delhi Sultanate have been noted; Hindu-Muslim relations were largely fraternal. (Note: At the same time, desecration of temples, and forced conversions have been noted. Some fled Marwar to avoid Muslim subjugation.)

=== Mughal period ===
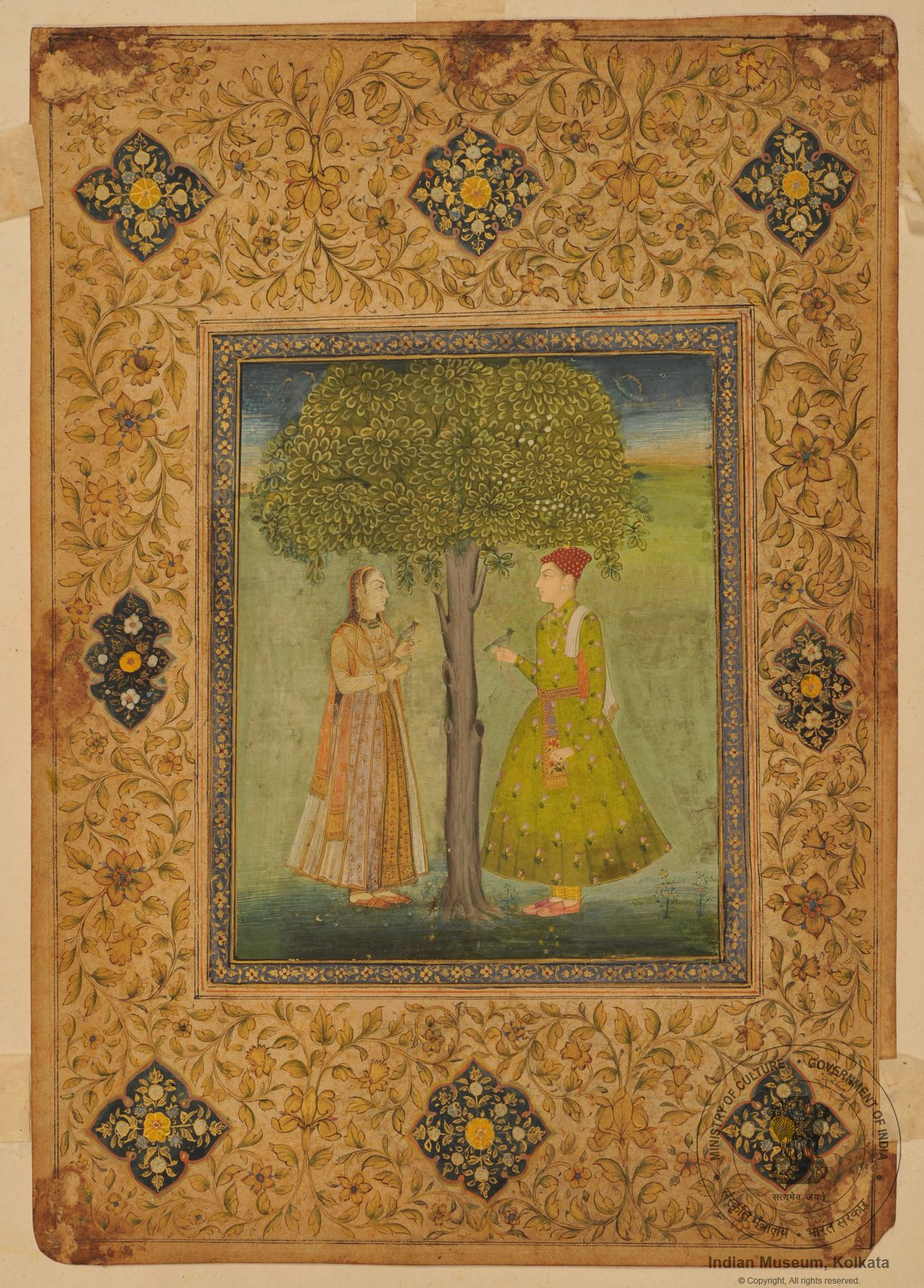
Jagat Gosain (left) a Rathore Princess and her husband Jahangir (right). She was the mother of Shah Jahan.

The situations deteriorated once Akbar was ordained as the Mughal Emperor, and rao Maldeo died. His son rao Chandrasen Rathore defended his kingdom for nearly two decades against relentless attacks from the Mughal Empire. The Jodhawat Rathores lost much of their territory rapidly and were effectively subsumed. The Bikawat Rathores entered into friendly relations with the Mughals, led their armies, and were extensively patronaged to the extent of being allowed to control the Jodhpur Fort. In 1583, Uday Singh finally accepted Mughal suzerainty and in return, was granted part of a Pargana in Jodhpur; this would enable the Jodhawat Rathores to become all-weather allies of the Mughals though punctuated with discords.

This span of cohabitation led to the introduction of strict endogamy into Rathore folds and hypergamy with Mughals. It was also under the Mughals, that bardic genealogies were crafted to present themselves as worthy appointees of the Mughals and distinguish themselves from other "once-fraternal" communities, thereby staking a claim to power irrespective of temporal situations. Also, by this time, the nomadic memories were better suppressed and the Rathores had themselves rebranded as the elite "protectors" of local cattle-rearers; in a couple of centuries, figures from early Rathore polity would be deified.

Many scions of the Rathore clan were able to establish their own kingdoms during the Mughal reign. Barbara Ramusack notes how a 23-year-old Ratan Singh Rathore, who was from a younger branch of the Jodhpur ruling family, was able to rise in rank by fighting against a mad elephant in Delhi. Shah Jahan was so impressed by his valour that he enlisted Ratan Singh in his army. Ratan Singh was able to rise to a rank of 3,000, received the Mahi-Maratib and Jagirs in Malwa, where he founded his own kingdom in Ratlam. The dynasty started by Ratan Singh would further breakaway and form the kingdoms of Sailana and Sitamau.

During Aurangzeb's reign major rebellions would break out resulting in a 30 year war between the Mughals and the Rathores. The rebellion would continue until Bahadur Shah I's reign. Durgadas Rathore played an instrumental role in protecting the Rathore dynasty of Jodhpur during this war.

=== British period ===
The Rathore ruler of Jodhpur, Man Singh, initially refused to form treaties with the British. However in 1805-1806 he approached the British for military advice and paid the British to protect his state against the predatory actions of the Marathas and Pindaris. By 1816 the British changed this treaty and expelled all foreign influence in Jodhpur, they also started arbitrating in state matters. By 1818 the alliance was cemented and in 1832 the Rajputana agency was formed. Man Singh was not always cordial with the British during this time, in 1829 Man Singh gave shelter to Mudhoji II Bhonsle and antagonized the British. Mudhoji was zealously protected by Man Singh and lived his remaining life in Jodhpur till his death in 1840. Man Singh was finally caught with evidence, when his spy Dhumdas was arrested by the British. Man Singh was using ascetics as spies and messengers. The letters proved that Man Singh was part of an "anti-British cabal" which included Maharaja Ranjit Singh of Punjab, Dost Muhammad, King of Afghanistan and the Russians. In September 1839 the British sent an army and captured Jodhpur. Man Singh chose to relinquish his throne and became an ascetic to avoid war. The exiled maharaja of Jodhpur died on 5 September 1843 due to poor health. The 1857 rebellion sparked uprisings amongst several Rajput chieftains of the Rathore clan in Jodhpur State. Prominent amongst them was Kushal Singh of Auwa. After several failed attempts by the British, the rebellion was quelled by the British army under the command of Brigadier Holmes.

== Princely states ==
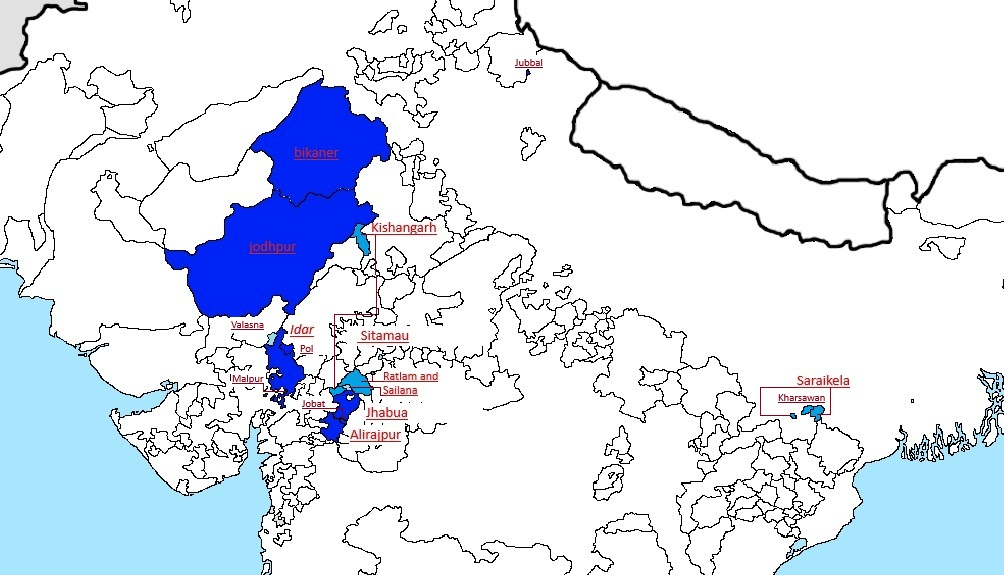
Dominions under the Rathore dynasty. ( before 1600; before 1700; after 1700)

=== Gun-salute states ===
The various cadet branches of the Rathore clan gradually spread to encompass all of Marwar and later founded states in Central India and Gujarat. The Marwar Royal family is considered the head house of Rathores. At the time of India's independence in 1947, nine states were considered important enough to receive gun salutes and had a total area of 60,000 sq. miles, which was merged to India.

- Jodhpur State (Marwar) in present-day Rajasthan, founded in 1226 by Rao Siha.
- Bikaner State in present-day Rajasthan, founded in 1465 by Rao Bika (son of Rao Jodha).
- Kishangarh State in present-day Rajasthan, founded in 1611 by Maharaja Kishan Singh.
- Ratlam State in present-day Madhya Pradesh, founded in 1651 by Maharaja Ratan Singh.
- Jhabua State in present-day Madhya Pradesh, founded in 1584 by Raja Keshav Das.
- Sitamau State in present-day Madhya Pradesh, founded 1701 by Raja Kesho Das.
- Sailana State in present-day Madhya Pradesh, founded in 1730 by Raja Jai Singh.
- Alirajpur State in present-day Madhya Pradesh, founded in 1437 by Raja Anand Deo.
- Idar State in present-day Gujarat, founded in 1257 by Rao Sonag, reconquered in 1729 by Rao Anand Singh.

=== Non-salute states ===
Non-salute States who claimed Rathore ancestry included:

- Jobat State in present-day Madhya Pradesh, founded in 1437 by Raja Anand Deo.
- Jubbal State in present-day Himachal Pradesh founded in by the 12th century by Rana Karam Chand
- Malpur State in present-day Gujarat, founded in 1466,
- Vijaynagar (Pol) State in present-day Gujarat, founded in 1577
- Valasana State in present-day Gujarat
- Saraikela State in present-day Jharkhand, founded in 1620 by Raja Bikram Singh.
- Kharsawan State in present-day Jharkhand, founded in 1650

== Rulers ==
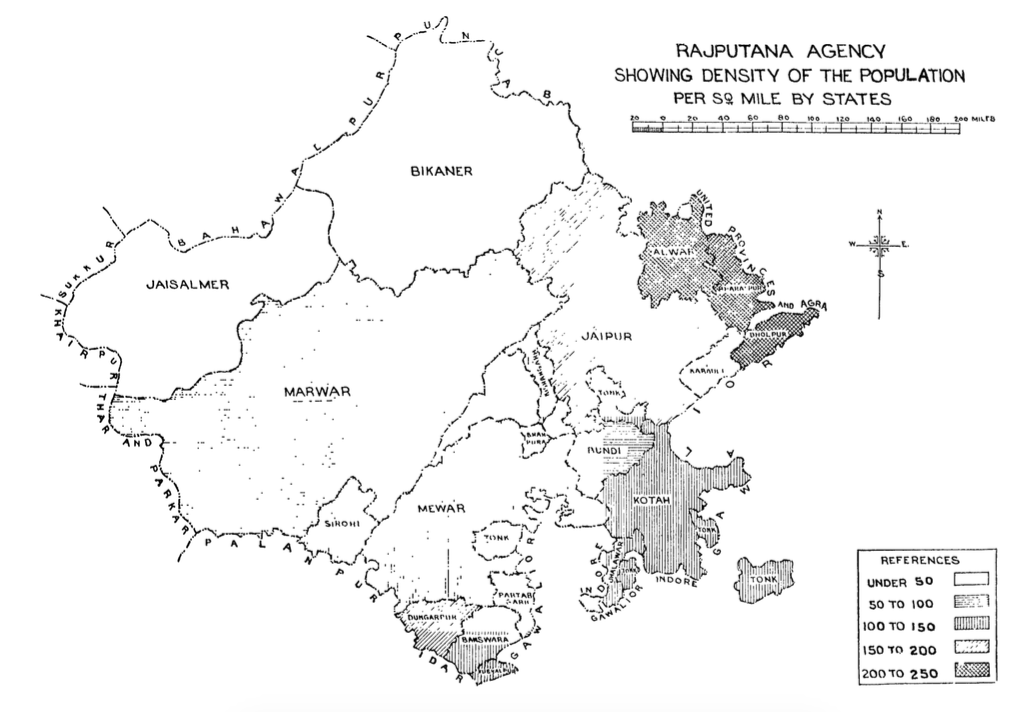
Map of the Rajputana Agency

=== Main Branch in Marwar ===
==== Rulers: 1226–1438 ====
(From Pali and Mandore)

Name		Reign began	Reign ended
1	Rao Siha	1226	1273
2	Rao Asthan	1273	1292
3	Rao Doohad	1292	1309
4	Rao Raipal	1309	1313
5	Rao Kanhapal	1313	1323
6	Rao Jalansi	1323	1328
7	Rao Chaddo	1328	1344
8	Rao Tida	1344	1357
	Rao Kanhadev	1357	1374
	Rao Salkha	1374	?
9	Rao Vikramdev	?	1383
11	Rao Chunda	1383	1428
12	Rao Kanha	1428	1428
13	Rao Ranmal	1428	1438

==== Rulers: 1438–1949 ====
(From Jodhpur)

Name		Reign began	Reign ended
1	Rao Jodha	12 May 1438	6 April 1489
2	Rao Satal	6 April 1489	13 March 1492
3	Rao Suja	13 March 1492	2 October 1515
4	Rao Biram Singh	2 October 1515	8 November 1515
5	Rao Ganga	8 November 1515	9 May 1532
6	Rao Maldeo	9 May 1532	7 November 1562
7	Rao Chandra Sen	7 November 1562	11 January 1581
8	Raja Udai Singh Mota Raja	4 August 1583	11 July 1595
9	Sawai Raja Suraj Mal	11 July 1595	7 September 1619
10	Maharaja Gaj Singh I	7 September 1619	6 May 1638
11	Maharaja Jaswant Singh	6 May 1638	28 December 1678
12	Maharaja Ajit Singh	19 February 1679	24 June 1724
13	Raja Indra Singh	9 June 1679	4 August 1679
14	Maharaja Abhai Singh	24 June 1724	18 June 1749
15	Maharaja Ram Singh	18 June 1749	July 1751
16	Maharaja Bakht Singh	July 1751	21 September 1752
17	Maharaja Vijay Singh	21 September 1752	31 January 1753
18	Maharaja Ram Singh	31 January 1753	September 1772
19	Maharaja Vijay Singh	September 1772	17 July 1793
20	Maharaja Bhim Singh	17 July 1793	19 October 1803
21	Maharaja Man Singh	19 October 1803	4 September 1843
22	Maharaja Sir Takht Singh	4 September 1843	13 February 1873
23	Maharaja Sir Jaswant Singh II	13 February 1873	11 October 1895
24	Maharaja Sir Sardar Singh	11 October 1895	20 March 1911
25	Maharaja Sir Sumer Singh	20 March 1911	3 October 1918
26	Maharaja Sir Umaid Singh	3 October 1918	9 June 1947
27	Maharaja Sir Hanwant Singh	9 June 1947	7 April 1949
28	(titular) Maharaja Gaj Singh II of Jodhpur	26 January 1952	Present

=== Bikaner Branch ===
- 1465 – 1504: Rao Bika
- 1504 – 1505: Rao Nar Singh
- 1505 – 1526: Rao Lunkaran Singh
- 1526 – 1542: Rao Jait Singh
- 1542 – 1571: Rao Kalyan Mal Singh
- 1571 – 1612: Rao / Raja Rai Singh
- 1612 – 1613: Raja Dalpat Singh
- 1613 – 1631: Raja Sur Singh
- 1631 – 1667: Raja Karan Singh
- 1667 – 1669: Interregnum
- 1669 – 1698 Maharaja Anup Singh
- 19 Jun 1698 – 15 December 1700: Maharaja Swarup Singh (b. 1689 – d. 1700)
- 15 Dec 1700 – 16 December 1735: Maharaja Sujan Singh (b. 1690 – d. 1735)
- 16 Dec 1735 – 15 May 1746: Maharaja Zorawar Singh (b. 1713 – d. 1746)
- 15 May 1746 – 25 March 1787: Maharaja Gaj Singh (b. 1723 – d. 1787)
- 25 Mar 1787 – 25 April 1787: Maharaja Raj Singh (b. 1744 – d. 1787)
- 25 Apr 1787 – 9 October 1787: Maharaja Pratap Singh (b. 1781 – d. 1787)
- 25 Apr 1787 – 25 March 1828: Maharaja Surat Singh (Regent to 9 October 1787) (b. 1766 – d. 1828)
- 25 Mar 1828 – 7 August 1851: Maharajadhiraj Shri Narendra Shiromani Maharaja Ratan Singh (b. 1790 – d. 1851)
- 7 August 1851 – 16 May 1872: Maharajadhiraj Shri Narendra Shiromani Maharaja Sardar Singh (b. 1818 – d. 1872)
- 16 May 1872 – 19 August 1887: HH Shri Maharajadhiraj Narendra Shiromani Maharaja Sir Dungar Singh (b. 1854 – d. 1887)
- 19 Aug 1887 – 2 February 1943: HH Shri Maharajadhiraj Narendra Shiromani General Maharaja Sir Ganga Singh Bahadur (b. 1880 – d. 1943) (from 24 July 1901, Sir Ganga Singh)
- 19 Aug 1887 – 16 December 1898: the British Political Agents-Regent
- 2 February 1943 – 15 August 1950: HH Shri Maharajadhiraj Narendra Shiromani Lt. General Maharaja Sir Sadul Singh (b. 1902 – d. 1950) (since 1 January 1946, he was addressed as Sir Sadul Singh)
- 15 August 1950 - 6 September 1988: HH Shri Maharajadhiraj Narendra Shiromani Colonel Dr. Maharaja Karni Singh (b. 1924 - d. 1988) (Post the 26th Constitutional Amendment Act, 1971, Royal titles were formally abolished and the Maharaja became the head of the Family and the seat of Bika Rathores)
- 6 September 1988 - 24 October 2003: (titular) Maharaja Narendra Singh (b. 1946 - d. 2003)
- 24 October 2003 - 12 April 2022: (titular) Maharaja Raviraj Singh (b. 1977 - d. 2022)
- 12 April 2022 – Present: Vacant. (No direct male heirs) (Closest Male line relatives: 6th Cousins)

=== Kishangarh Branch ===
- 1611 – 1615: Raja Kishan Singh
- 1615 – 1618: Raja Sahas Mal
- 1617 – 1629: Raja Jag Mal
- 1629 – 1643: Raja Hari Singh
- 1643 – 1658: Raja Roop Singh
- Jun 1658 – Oct 1706: Raja Man Singh (b. 1655 – d. 1706)
- Oct 1706 – Apr 1748: Raja Raj Singh (b. 1674 – d. 1748)
- 1748 – 1781: Raja Bahadur Singh (d. 1781)
- 1748 – 21 August 1765: Raja Sawant Singh (b. 1699 – d. 1765) (in opposition to 1756; from 1756 raja of Roopnagar)
- 21 August 1765 – 16 May 1768: Raja Sardar Singh (b. 1730 – d. 1768) (Raja of Roopnagar; regent for Raja Sawant Singh 1756–65)
- 1781 – 22 Nov 1788: Raja Birad Singh (b. 1737 – d. 1788)
- 22 November 1788 – 5 March 1798: Raja Pratap Singh (b. 1763 – d. 1798)
- 5 March 1798 – 22 May 1839: Maharaja Kalyan Singh (b. 1794 – d. 1839)
- 22 May 1839 – 31 August 1841: Maharaja Mohkam Singh (b. 1817 – d. 1841)
- 31 August 1841 – 25 December 1879: HH Umda-e-Raja-e-Buland Makan Diwan Maharaja Shri Prithvi Singh Bahadur (b. 1838 – d. 1879)
- 25 December 1879 – 18 August 1900: HH Umda-e-Raja-e-Buland Makan Diwan Maharaja Shri Sir Sadul Singh Bahadur (b. 1857 – d. 1900) (from 1 January 1892, Sir Sardul Singh)
- 18 August 1900 – 25 September 1926: Lieutenant-Colonel HH Umda-e-Raja-e-Buland Makan Diwan Maharaja Shri Sir Madan Singh Bahadur (b. 1884 – d. 1926) (from 1 January 1909, Sir Madan Singh)
- 25 September 1926 – 3 February 1939: HH Umda-e-Raja-e-Buland Makan Diwan Maharaja Shri Yagya Narayan Singh Bahadur (b. 1896 – d. 1939)
- 3 February 1939 – 15 August 1947: HH Umda-e-Raja-e-Buland Makan Diwan Maharaja Shri Sumer Singh Bahadur (b. 1929 – d. 1971)

=== Ratlam Branch ===
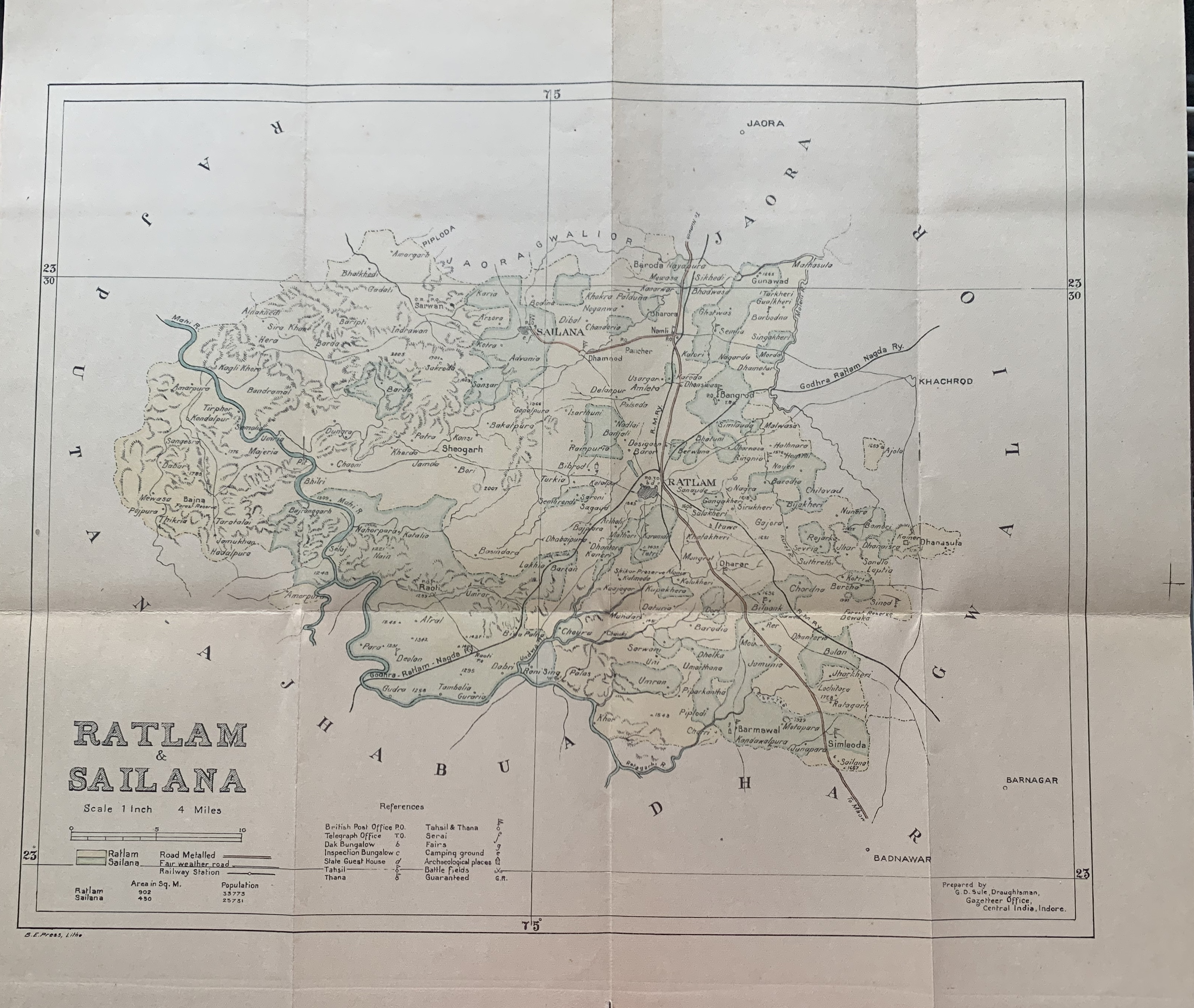
Map of Sailana and Ratlam

Name	Date of Reign
Ratan Singh (d.1658)	1648–1658
Ram Singh	1658–1682
Keshodas	1682–1701
Chhatrasal (d. 1712)	1705–1709
Keshri Singh	1709 – Feb 1716
Pratap Singh	Feb 1716–1716
Man Singh	1716–1743
Prithvi Singh	1743–1773
Padam Singh	1773–1800
Parbat Singh	1800–1825
Balwant Singh	1825–29 Aug 1857
Borthwick	1825–c.1832
Bhairon Singh	29 August 1857 – 27 January 1864
Ranjit Singh	27 January 1864 – 20 January 1893
Regency	27 January 1893 – 15 December 1898
Sajjan Singh	20 January 1893 – 1 January 1921
Sajjan Singh (s.a.)	1 January 1893 – 3 February 1947
Lokendra Singh (b. 1927 – d. 1991)	3 February 1947 – 15 August 1947

=== Jhabua Branch ===
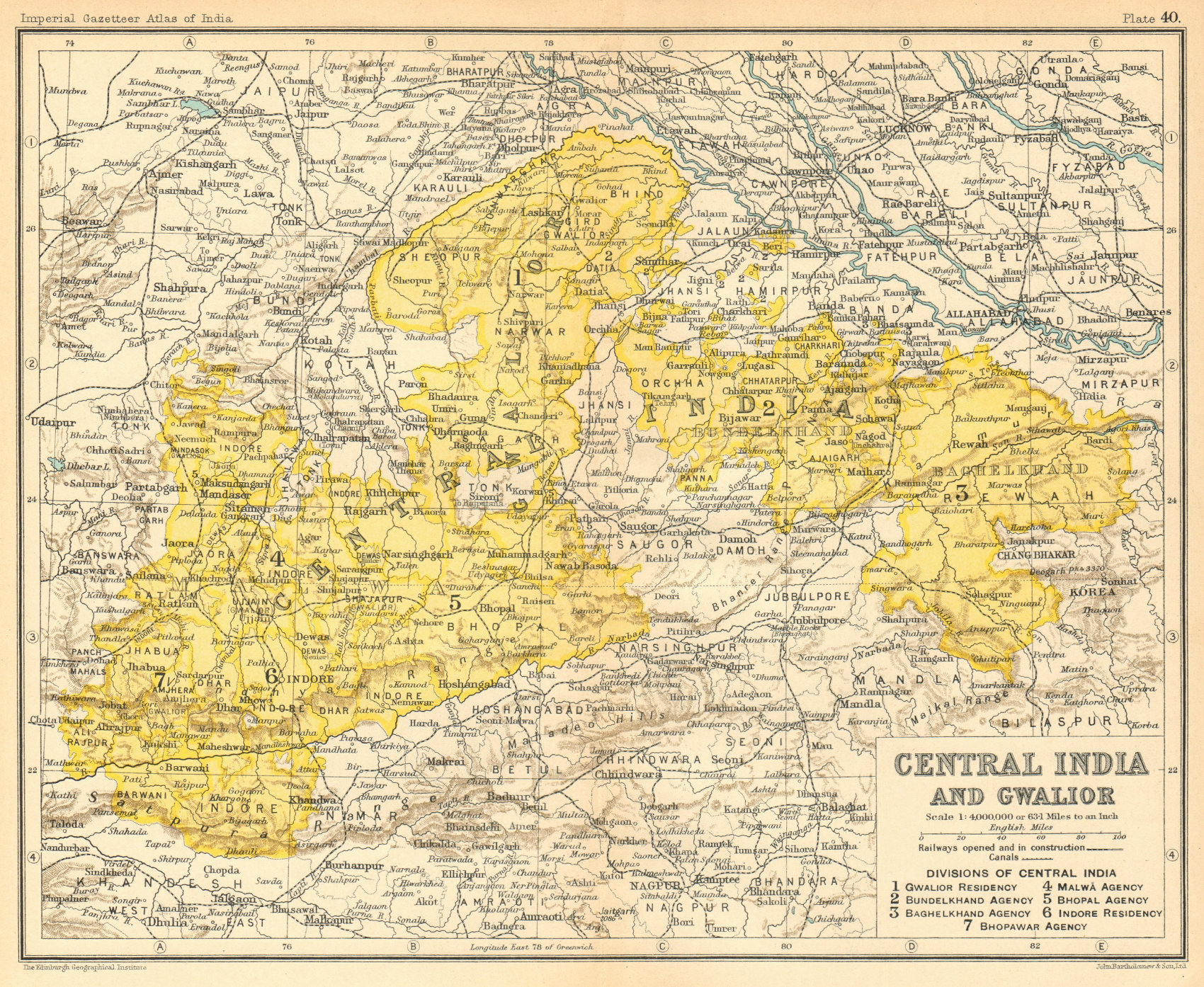
Map of the Central India Agency

1584 – 1607	Raja Keshav Das
1607 – 1610	Raja Karan Singh
1610 – 1677	Raja Maha Singh
1677 – 1723	Raja Kushal Singh
1723 – 1727	Raja Anup Singh
1727 – 1758	Raja Sheo Singh	(d. 1758)
1758 – 1770	Raja Bahadur Singh
1770 – 1821	Raja Bhim Singh	(d. 1829)
1821 – 1832	Raja Pratap Singh	(d. 1832)
1832 – 1840	Raja Ratan Singh	(d. 1840)
Nov 1841 – 1895	HH Raja Sir Gopal Singh	(b. 1841 – d. 1895)
26 Apr 1895 – 1942	HH Raja Sir Udai Singh	(b. 1875 – d. af.1945)
1942 – 15 Aug 1947	HH Raja Sir Dilip Singh	(b. 1905 – d. 1965)

=== Sitamau Branch ===
- 1701 – 1748 Raja Keshav Das
- 1748 – 1752 Raja Gaj Singh
- 1752 – 1802 Raja Fateh Singh
- 1802 – 1867 Raja Raj Singh (d. 1867),
- 1867 – 28 May 1885 Raja Bhawani Singh (b. 1836 – d. 1885)
- 8 Dec 1885 – 1899 Raja Bahadur Singh
- 1899 – 9 May 1900 Raja Shardul Singh
- 11 May 1900 – 15 August 1947 HH Raja Ram Singh (b. 1880 – d. 1967) (from 11 December 1911, Sir Raja Ram Singh )

=== Sailana Branch ===
Name	Year
Raja Jai Singh	1736–1757
Raja Jaswant Singh I	1757–1772
Raja Ajab Singh	1772–1782
Raja Mokham Singh	1782–1797
Raja Lakshman Singh	1797–1826
Raja Ratan Singh	1826–1827
Raja Nahar Singh	1827–1841
Raja Takhat Singh	1841–1850
Rajmata Nath Kanwarji (regent)	1850–1859
Raja Duleh Singh	1850–1895
HH Maharaja SirJashwant Singh II	1895–1919
HH Maharaja Sir Dileep Singh	1919 – 1948 (1948 – 1961 titular)
Maharaja Digvijay Singh (titular)	1961–1990
Maharaja Vikram Singh (titular)	1990 – present

=== Alirajpur Branch ===
- 1437–1440: Anand Deo (d. 1440)
- 1440–....: Pratap Deo
- .... - .... Chanchal Deo
- .... - .... Gugal Deo
- .... - .... Bachchharaj Deo
- .... - .... Dip Deo
- .... - .... Pahad Deo I
- .... - .... Udai Deo
- .... - 1765 Pahad Deo II (d. 1765)
- 1765 - 1818 Pratap Singh I (d. 1818)
- 1818 Musafir Makrani
- 1818 - 17 Mar 1862 Jashwant Singh (usurper) (b. 1818 - d. 1862)
- 1818 - 1839 Musafir Makrani -Manager
- 1862 - 1869 Ganga Deo (b. c.1845 - d. 1871)
- 1871 - 29 Oct 1881 Rup Deo (b. 1847 - d. 1881)
- 1869 - 1873 Muhammad Najaf Khan -Superintendent
- Shamsuddin Makrani Superintendent of Police alirajpur State
- 1881 - 16 Aug 1890 Bijai Singh (b. 1881 - d. 1890)
- 16 Aug 1890 – 14 Feb 1891 Interregnum
- 14 Feb 1891 - 1911 Pratap Singh II (b. 1881 - d. af. 1950) (installed Mar 1892)
- 1911 - 1941 Pratap Singh II (s.a.) (from 3 Jun 1933, Sir Pratap Singh II)(personal style of Maharaja from 1941)
- 1941 - 23 Oct 1941 Fateh Singh (b. 1904 - d. 1941)
- 23 Oct 1941 – 15 Aug 1947 Surendra Singh (b. 1923 - d. 1996)
- 23 Oct 1941 – 15 Aug 1947 Sir Pratap Singh -Regent (s.a.)

=== Saraikela Branch ===
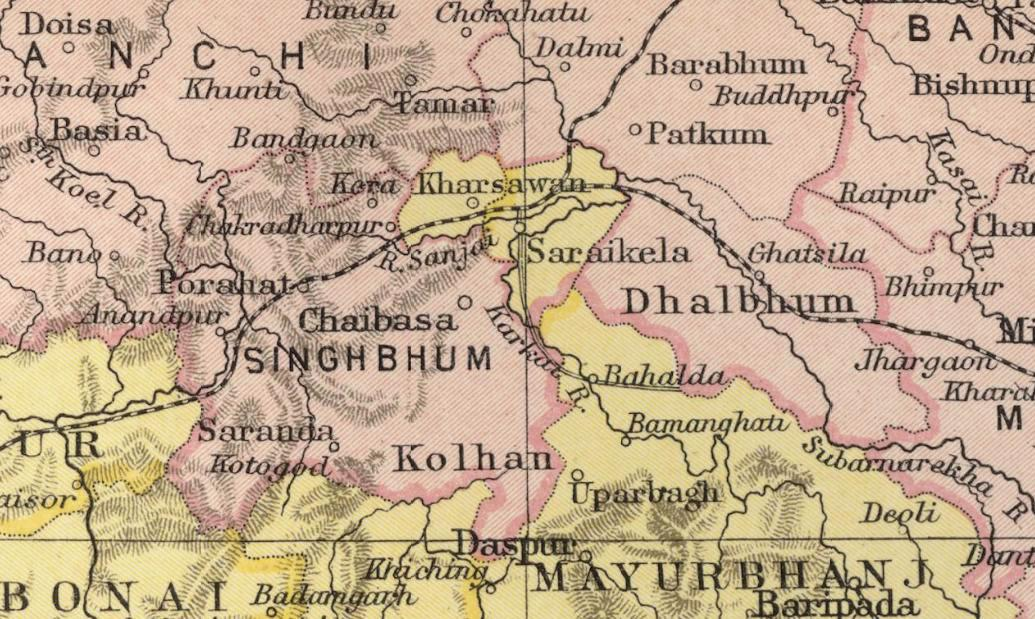
Map of Sairakela and Kharsawan

- 1620 – 1677 Bikram Singh I
- 1677 – 1728 Nru Singh
- 1728 – 1743 Satrughan Singh
- 1743 – 1818 Abhiram Singh
- 1818 – 1823 Bikram Singh II
- 1823 – 1837 Ajamber Singh
- 1837 – 1883 Chakradhar Singh
- 25 Nov 1883 – Nov 1884 Udit Narayan Singh (b. 1849 – d. 1931)
- Nov 1884 – 9 December 1931 Udit Narayan Singh (s.a.)
- 9 December 1931 – 15 August 1947 Aditya Pratap Singh (b. 1887 – d. 1969)

=== Kharsawan Branch ===
- 1857 – 1863 Gangaram Singh Deo (b. 1836 – d. 18..) (personal style Raja from 1860)
- 1863 – 18.. Ram Narain Singh
- 18.. – 2 March 1884 Raghunath Singh Deo (b. 1841 – d. 1884)
- 2 March 1884 – 6 February 1902 Mahendra Narayan Singh Deo (b. 1869 – d. 19..)
- 6 February 1902 – 1917 Siram Chandra Singh Deo (b. 1892 – d. 19..)

=== Jubbal Branch ===
Princely states in Himachal Pradesh, Jubbal in dark green

- .... - 1803 : Purana Chandra
- 1815 - 1832 : Purana Chandra (return to power)
- 1840 : Purana Chandra (3rd time)
- 1840 - 1877 : Rubin Kazan Chandra
- 1877 - 1898 : Padma Chandra (b. ... - d. 1898)
- 1898 - 29 Apr 1910 : Gyan Chandra (b. ... - d. 1910)

=== Vijaynagar (Pol) Branch ===
- .... – 1720 Chandrasinhji (d. 1720)
- 1720 – 1728 Kesarisinhji
- 1728 – .... Kasansinhji
- .... – .... Makansinhji
- .... – .... Hathisinhji
- .... – .... Madhavsinhji
- .... – .... Ajabsinhji
- .... – .... Bhupatsinhji I
- .... – .... Bhavansinhji
- .... – .... Surajsinhji
- .... – .... Vajesinhji
- .... – .... Ratansinhji
- .... – .... Abheysinhji
- .... – .... Kiratsinhji
- .... – .... Laxmansinhji
- .... – .... Bharatsinhji
- .... – .... Amarsinhji
- .... – 1852 Anandsinhji
- 1852 – 1859 Pahadsinhji Gulabsinhji (b. 1839 – d. 1859)
- 1859 – 1864 Navalsinhji (d. 1864)
- 23 Nov 1864 – 24 October 1889 Hamirsinhji I Gulabsinhji (b. 1840 – d. 1889)
- 24 Oct 1889 – 1905 Prithisinhji Hamirsinhji (b. 1872 – d. 1905)
- Feb 1906 – 1913 Bhupatsinhji II Hamirsinhji (b. 1885 – d. 1913)
- 1913 – 17 November 1914 Mohabatsinhji Bhupatsinhji (b. 1883 – d. 1914)
- 17 Nov 1914 – 1947 Hamirsinhji II Hindupatsinhji (b. 1902/4 – d. 1986)
- 17 Nov 1914 – 1924 .... -Regent

=== Jobat Branch ===
- Rana Bahhram Dev
- Rana Keshavdas Dev
- Rana Loonkaran Dev
- 1864 – 1874 Ranjit Singh
- 1874 – 1897 Sarup Singh
- 1897 – Mar 1916 Indrajit Singh
- 18 Jun 1917 – 15 Aug 1947 Bhim Singh (b. 1915)

Map of the Mahi Kantha Agency

=== Valasna State ===
- 1812 - .... Nathu Singh
- c.1880 Man Singh (b. 1850 - d. ....)
- .... - 1926 Hamir Singh (b. 1881 - d. 1926)
- 1926 - 1947 Shiv Singh (b. 1910).
- Thakore Sahib Shri Badrinarayansinh
- Kunwar Sahib Shri Satyanarayansinh Rathore

=== Malpur State ===
- 1780–1796 Indrasinhji
- 1796 Jamalsinhji (d. 1796)
- 1796–1816 Takhtsinhji Jamalsinhji
- 1816 –1822 Shivsinhji I
- 1822–1843 .... -Manager
- 1843–18.. Dipsinhji I (b. 1822 – d. 18..)
- 1875–1882 Shivsinhji II Khumansinhji (1841–1882)
- 12 Apr 1882 – 1914 Dipsinhji II (1863–1914)
- 1914–1923 Jaswatsinhji Dipsinhji (1886–1923)
- 23 Jun 1923 – 1947 Gambhirsinhji Himmatsinhji (1914–1969)
- 23 Jun 1923 – 1935 .... -Manager
- 11 May 1969 Gambhirsinhji Himmatsinhji (died)
- Present Chief of the Ruling Family and Maha Raolji – Saheb Shri Krishnasinhji (b. 1954)

=== Idar State ===
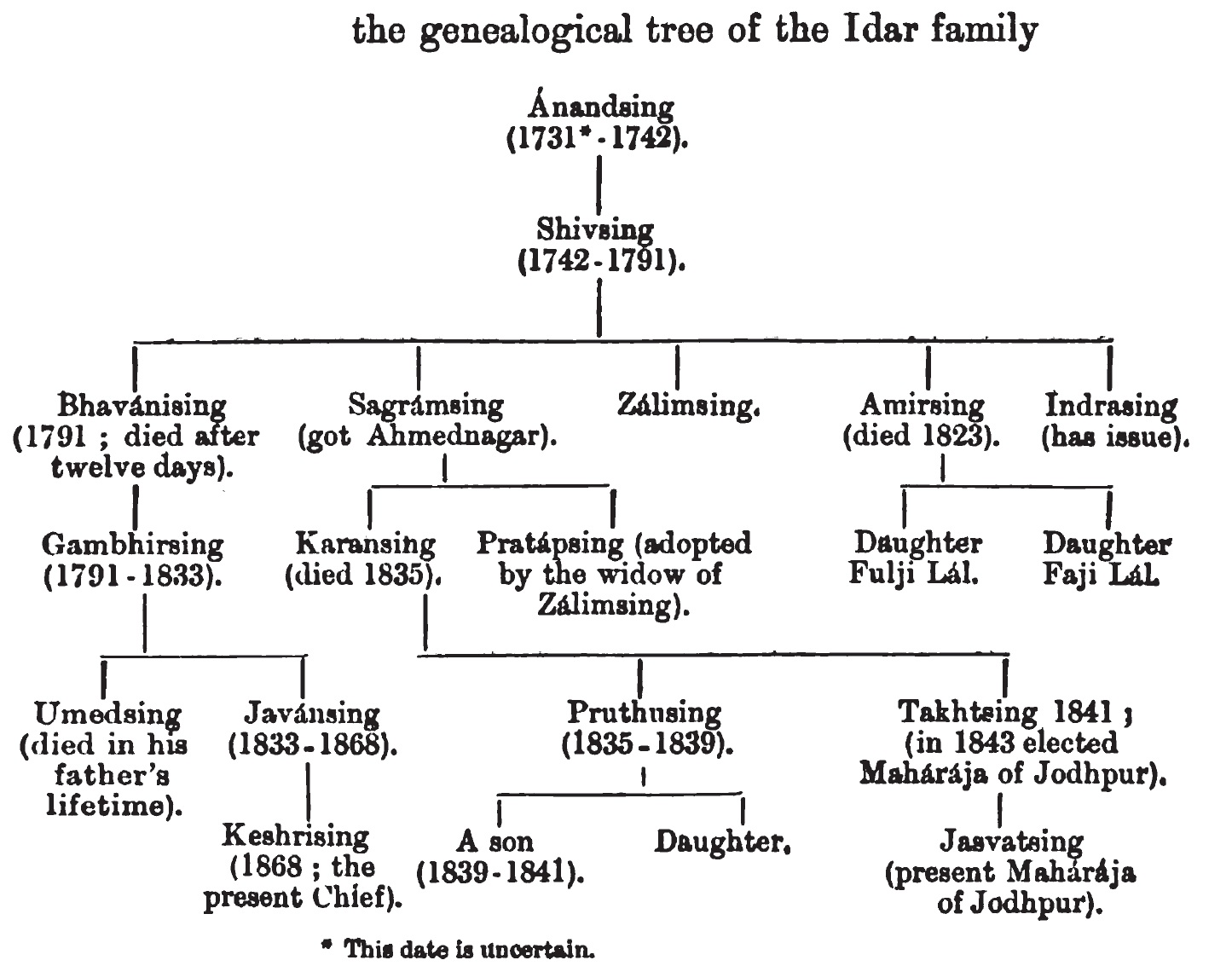

== Subclans ==
The Rathore dynasty has several notable subclans, which are branches or offshoots of the main lineage. These subclans were typically formed by prominent members of the dynasty, often as a result of territorial expansion or the establishment of new kingdoms. Some of the most recognised subclans are as follows:

Jodha, descendants of Rao Jodha Rathore of Jodhpur

Bika, descendants of Rao Bika Rathore of Bikaner

Vadhel, descendants of Rao Vadhel Rathore of Vadhel

Jaitawat, descendants of Rao Jaita Rathore

Jaitmalot, Descendants of Rao Jaitmal Rathore of Banol

Kumpawat, Descendants of Rao Kumpa Rathore of Harsor

Karnot, descendants of Veer Durgadas Rathore

Champawat, descendants of Rao Champa Rathore of Kaparda

Mertiya, descendants of Rao Duda Rathore of Merta

Bidawat, descendants of Rao Bida Rathore of Bidasar

Kandhalot, descendants of Rao Kandhal Rathore of Rawatsar

Udawat, descendants of Rao Uda Rathore of Neemaj

Sohar, descendants of Rao Shobhit Rathore of Soharawati

Bijawar, descendants of Rao Bijay Rathore of Marwar

Karamsot, descendants of Rao Karamsi Rathore of Khimsar

Mahecha, descendants of Rao Mallinath Rathore of Malani & Jasol

Vitthal Dasot, descendants of Rao Vitthaldas Rathore of Rinsi

Ratansinghot, descendants of Maharaja Ratan Singh Rathore of Ratlam

Fatehsinghot, descendants of Thakur Fateh Singh Rathore of Kod

Seendhal, descendants of Rao Seendhal Rathore of Namisa

Joloo, descendants of Rao Joloo Rathore

Jorawar, descendants of Rao Jorawat Rathore

Oohad, descendants of Rao Oohard Rathore of Korna

Moloo, descendants of Rao Moloo Rathore

Raikwar, descendants of Rao Raankaa Rathore of Raikwar

Patoji, descendants of Rao Pato Rathore of Barah

Rupawat, descendants of Rao Rupa Rathore of Chutila

Barsinghot, descendants of Rao Bar Rathore

Rare some of the branches or subclans of Rathore Rajputs.

== Gallery of Rulers ==
=== Marwar ===
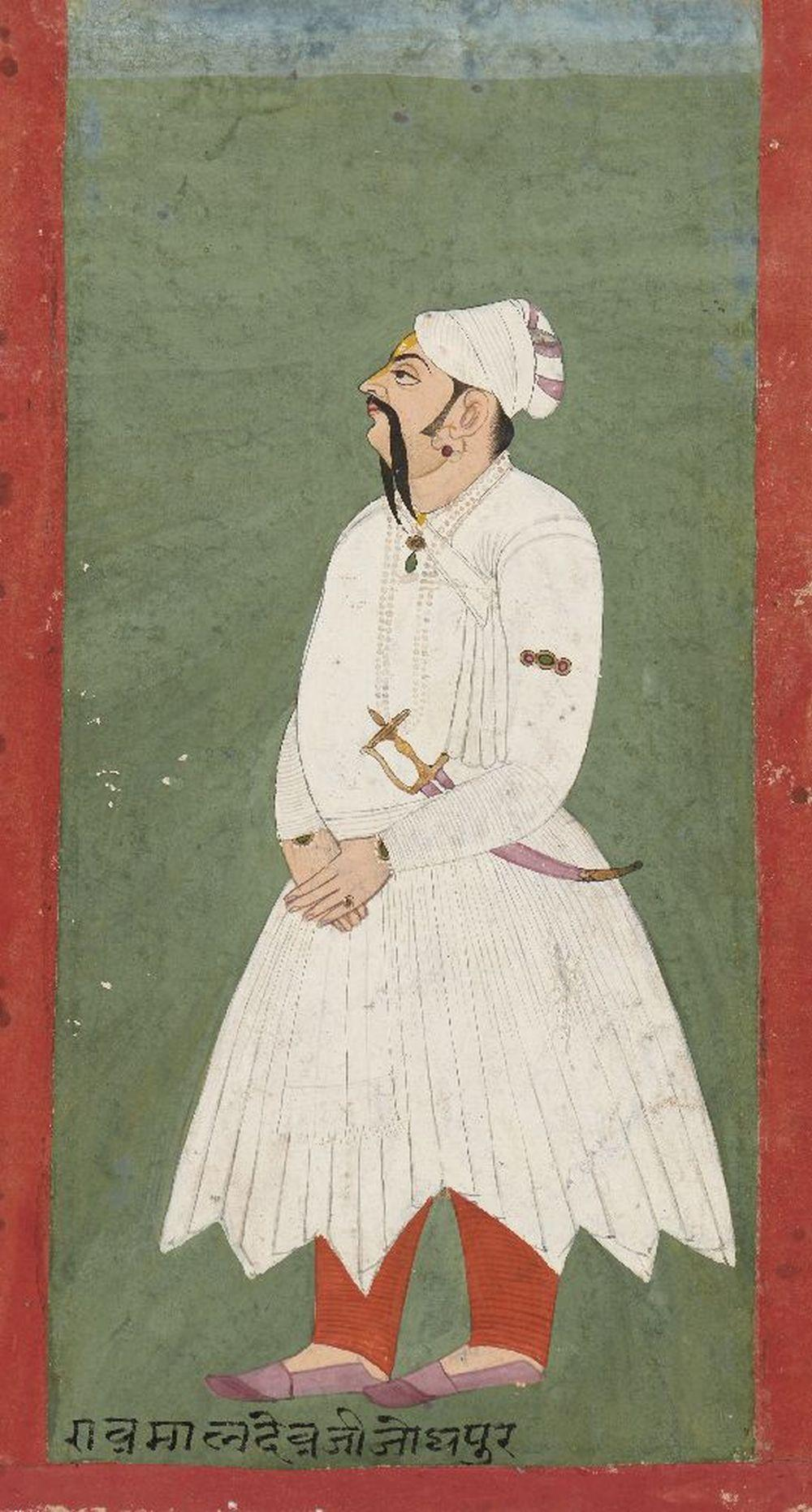
Maldeo Rathore

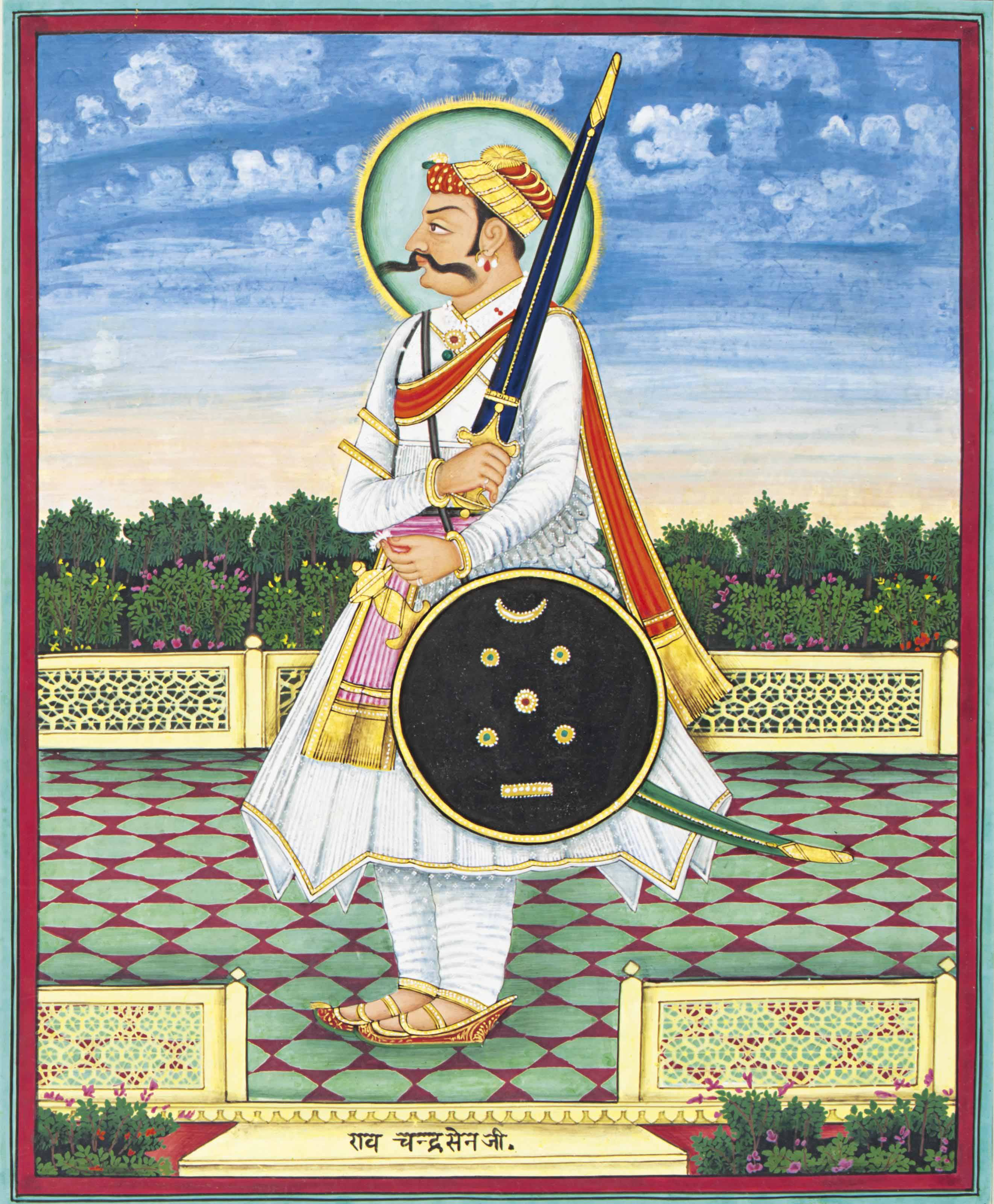
Chandrasen Rathore

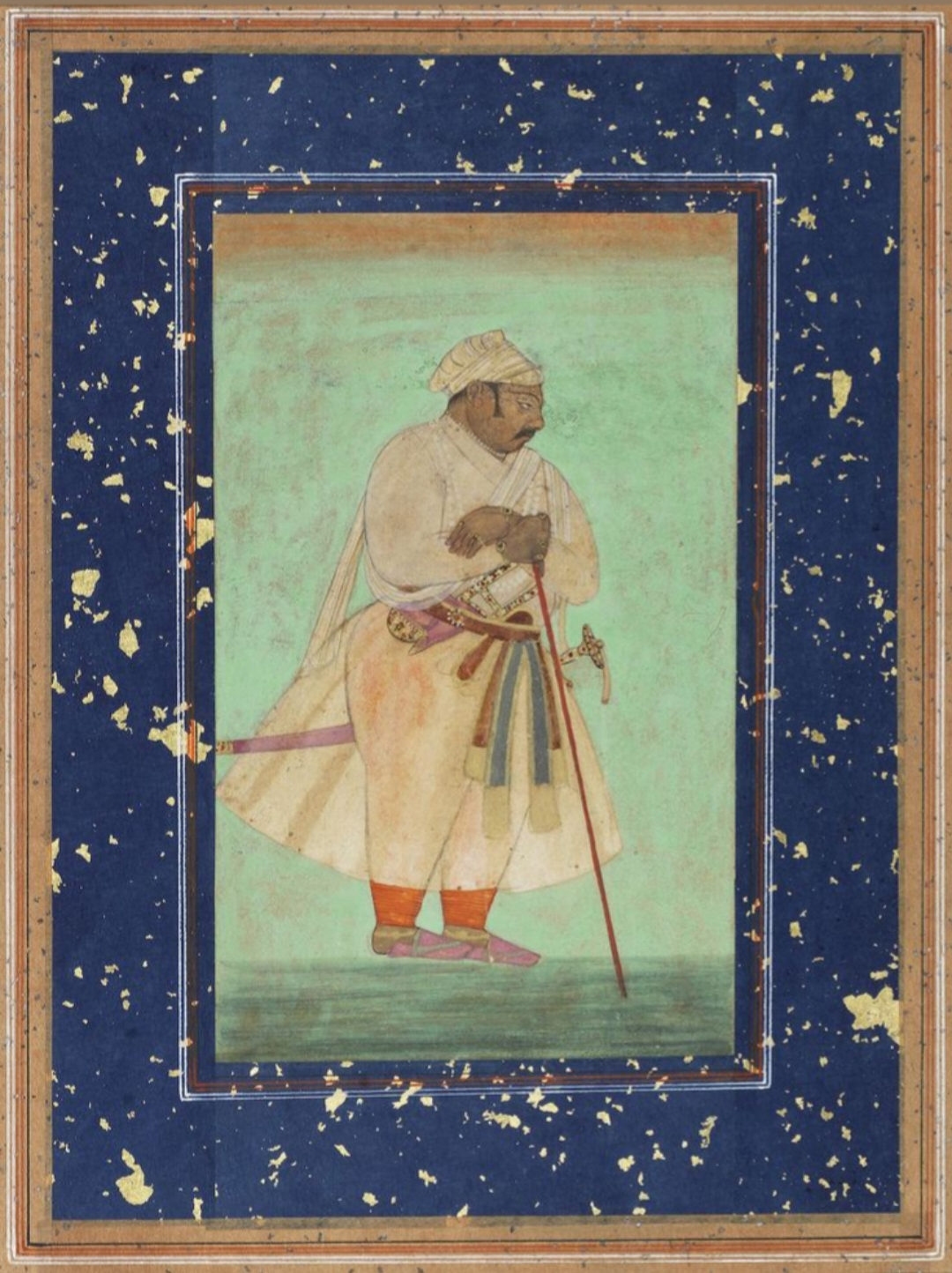
Udai Singh

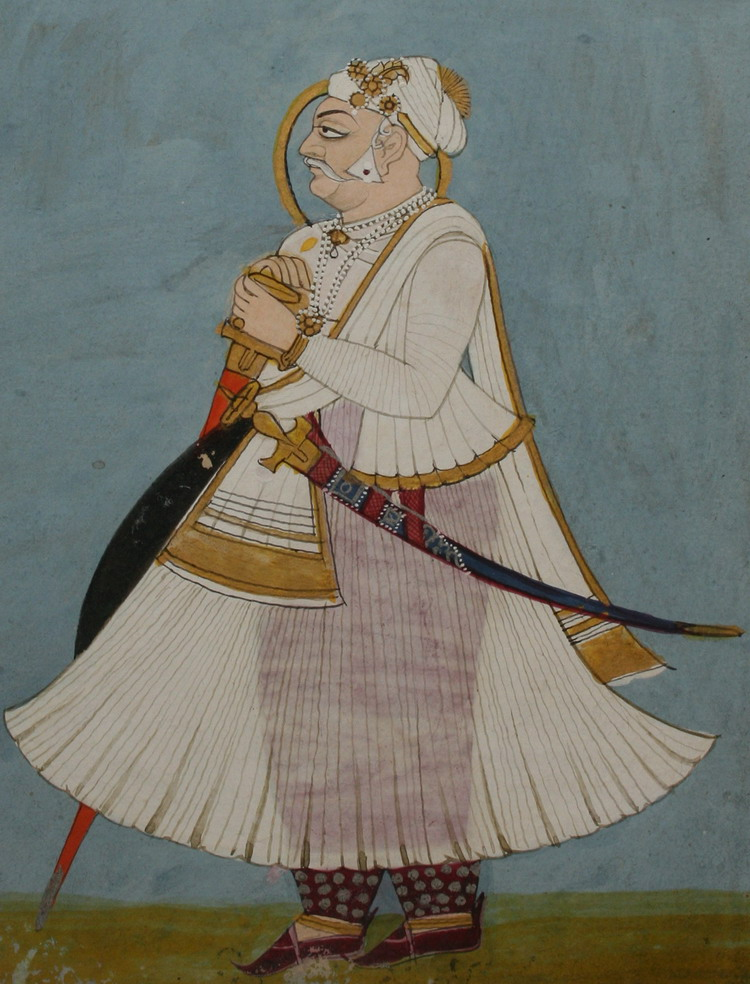
Jaswant Singh I

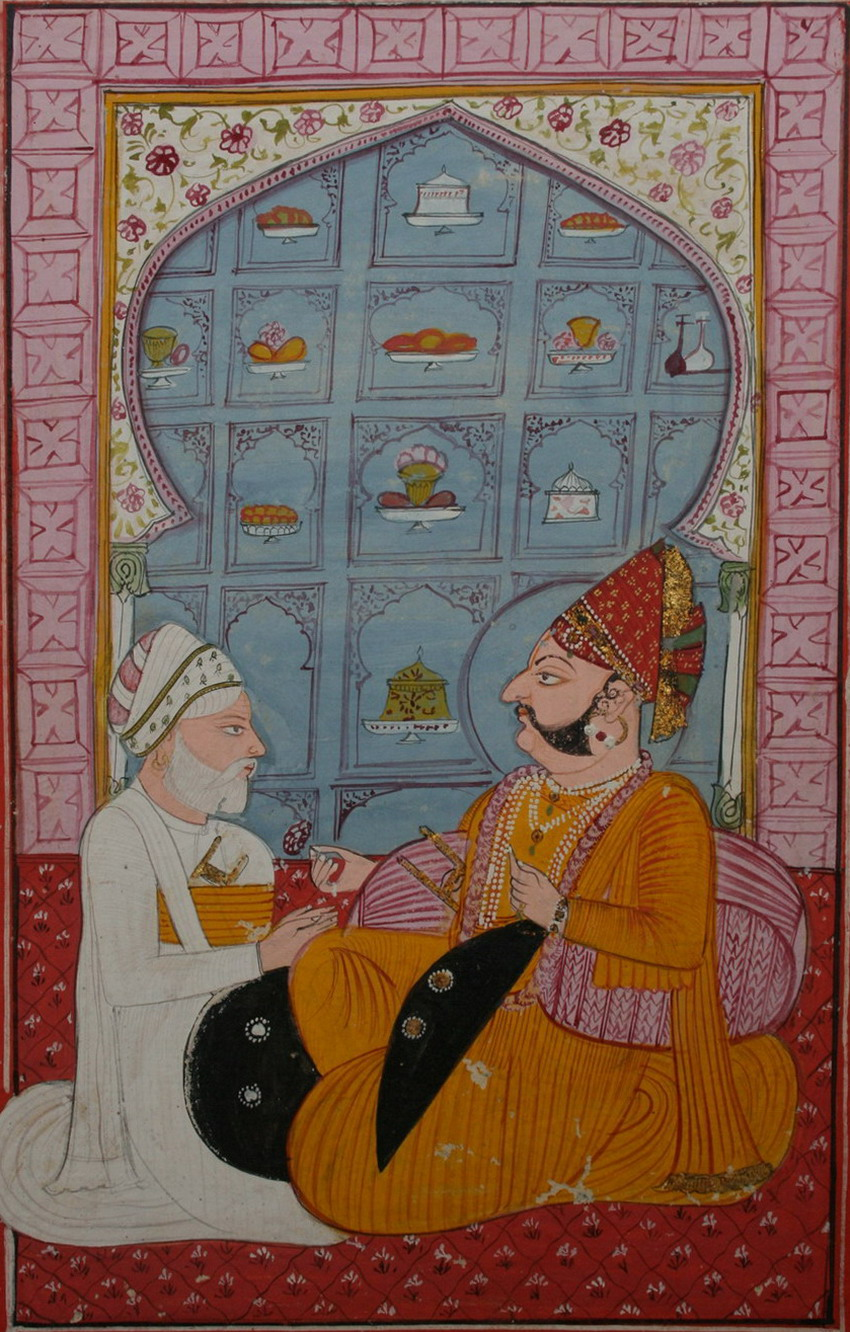
Ajit Singh

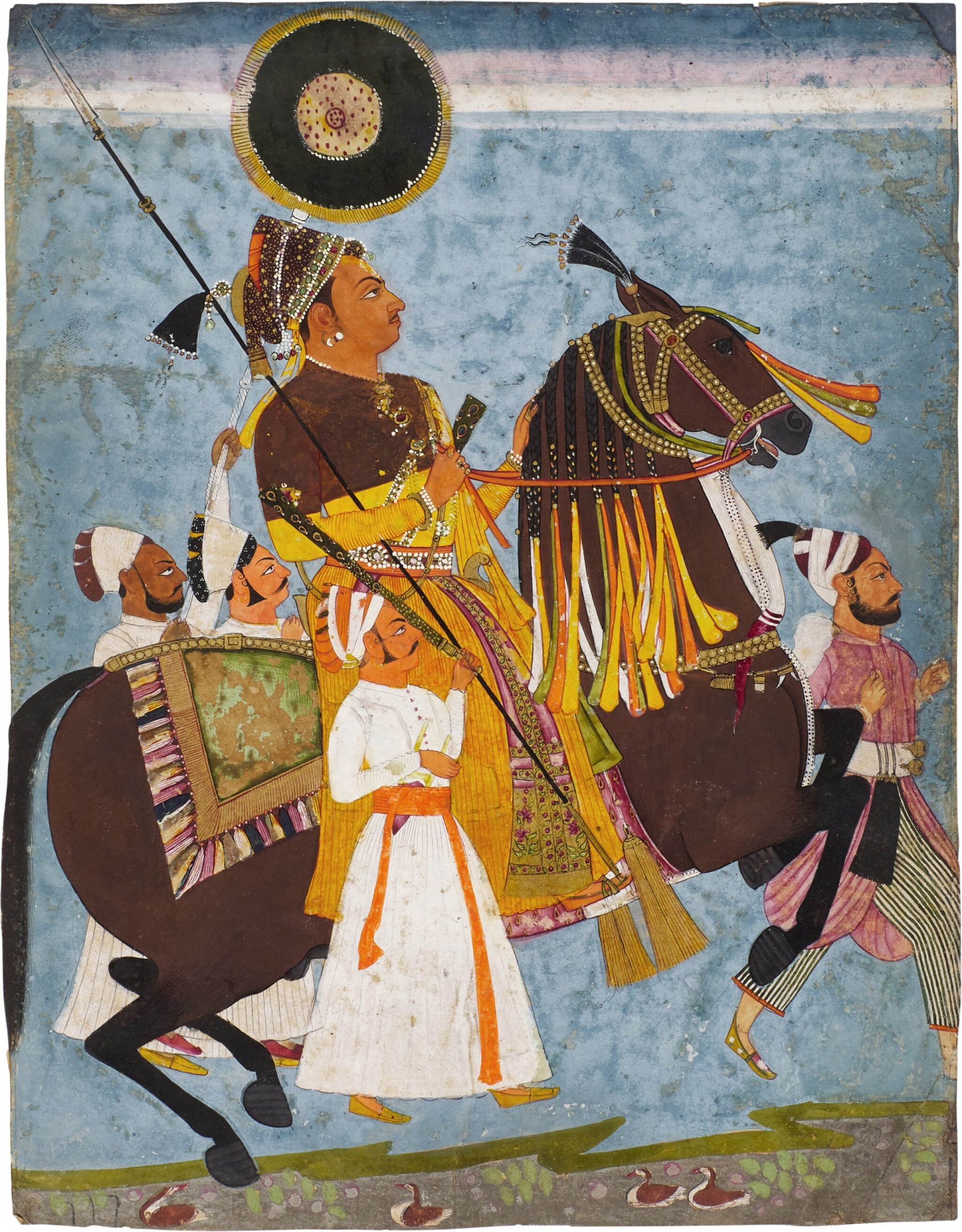
Abhai Singh

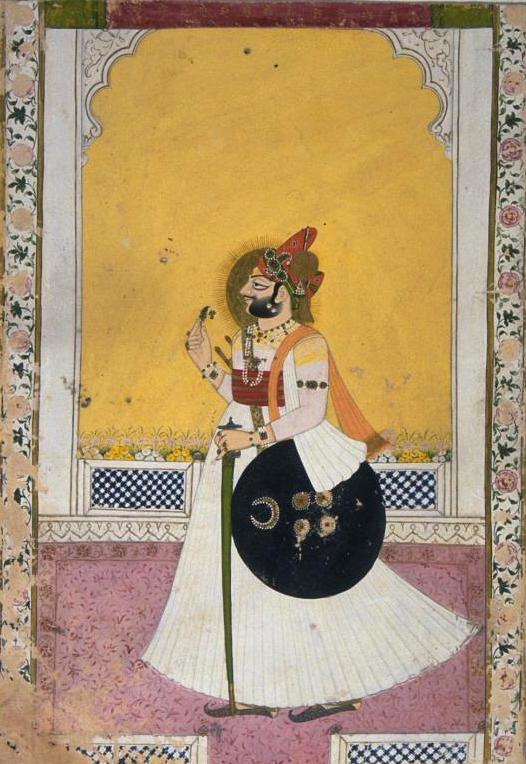
Man Singh

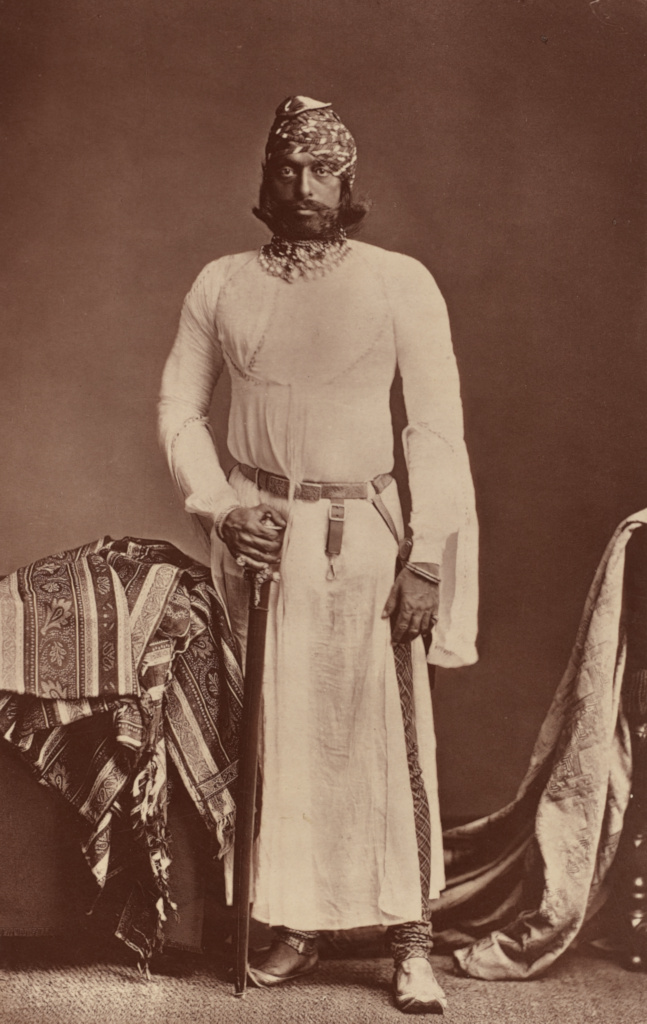
Jaswant Singh II

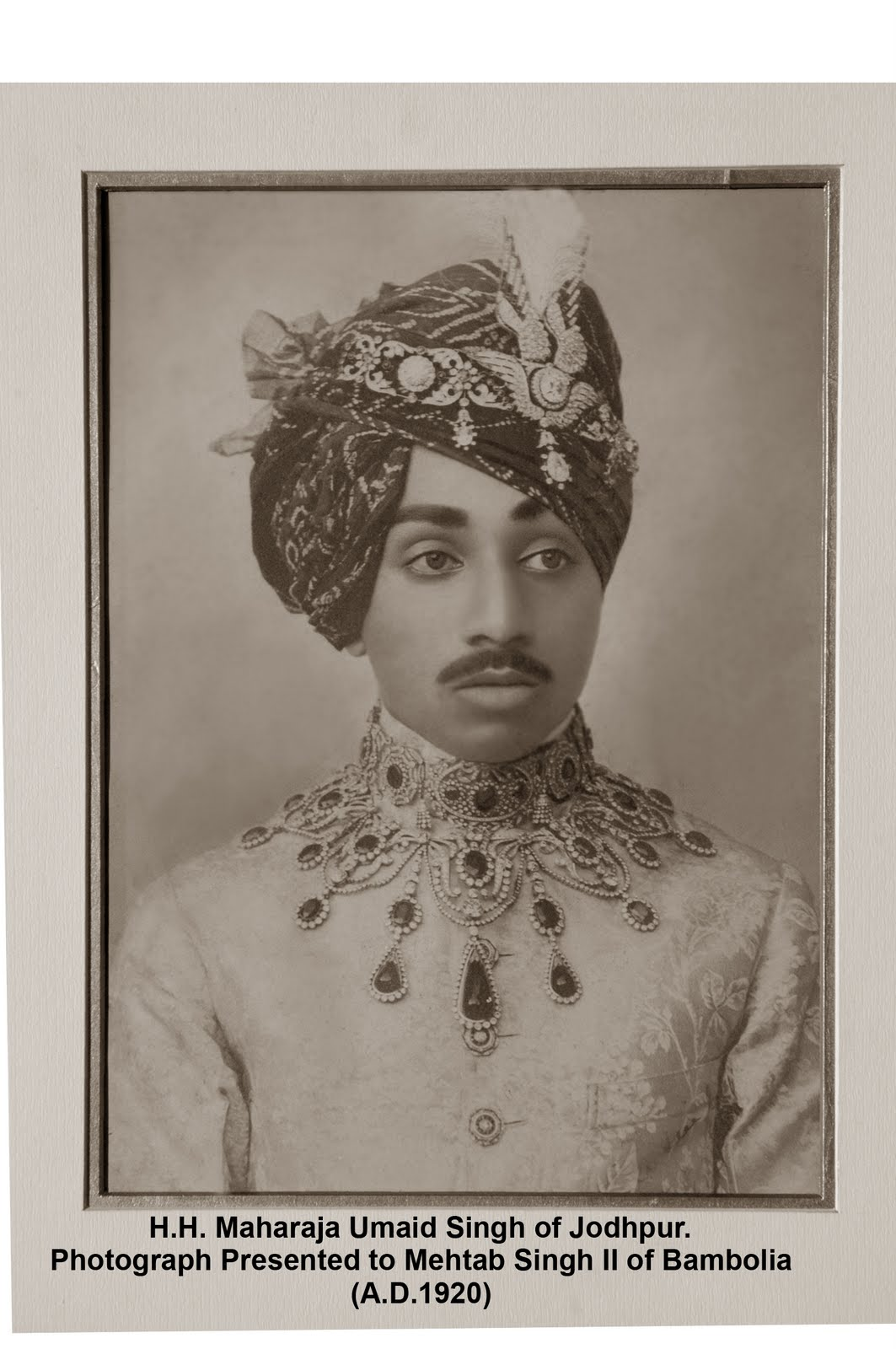
Umaid Singh

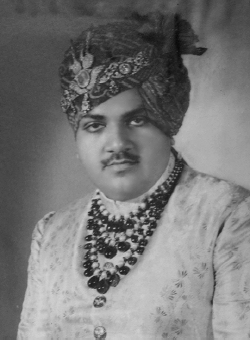
Hanwant Singh

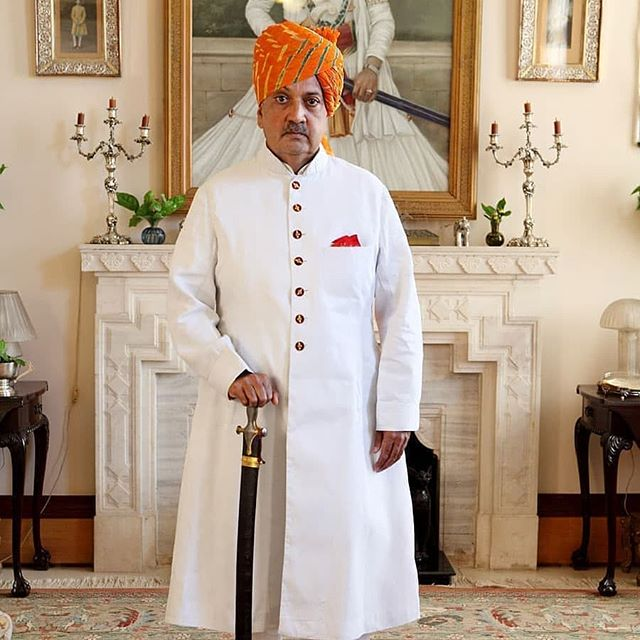
Gaj Singh (current head)

=== Bikaner ===
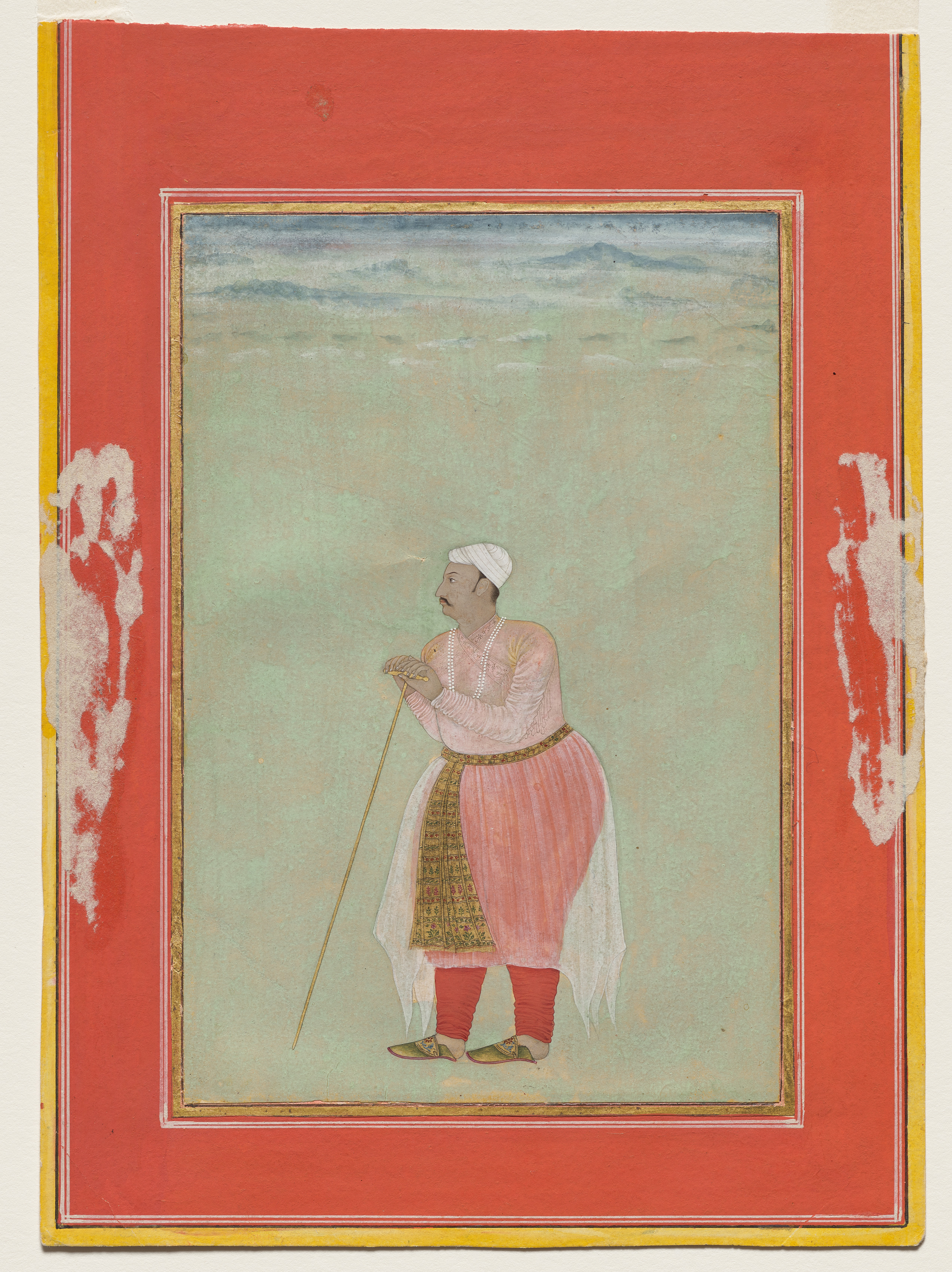
Rai Singh

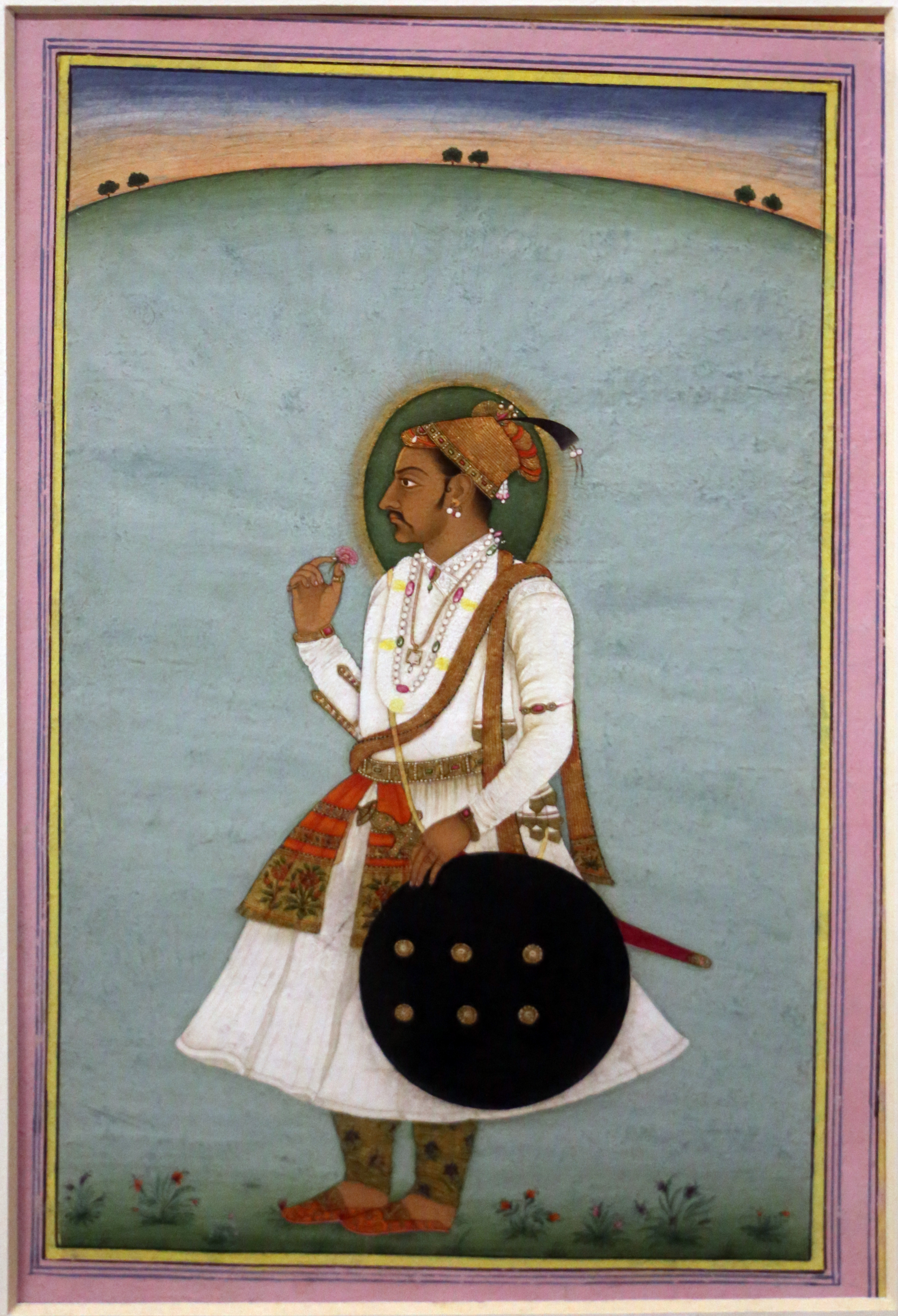
Anup Singh

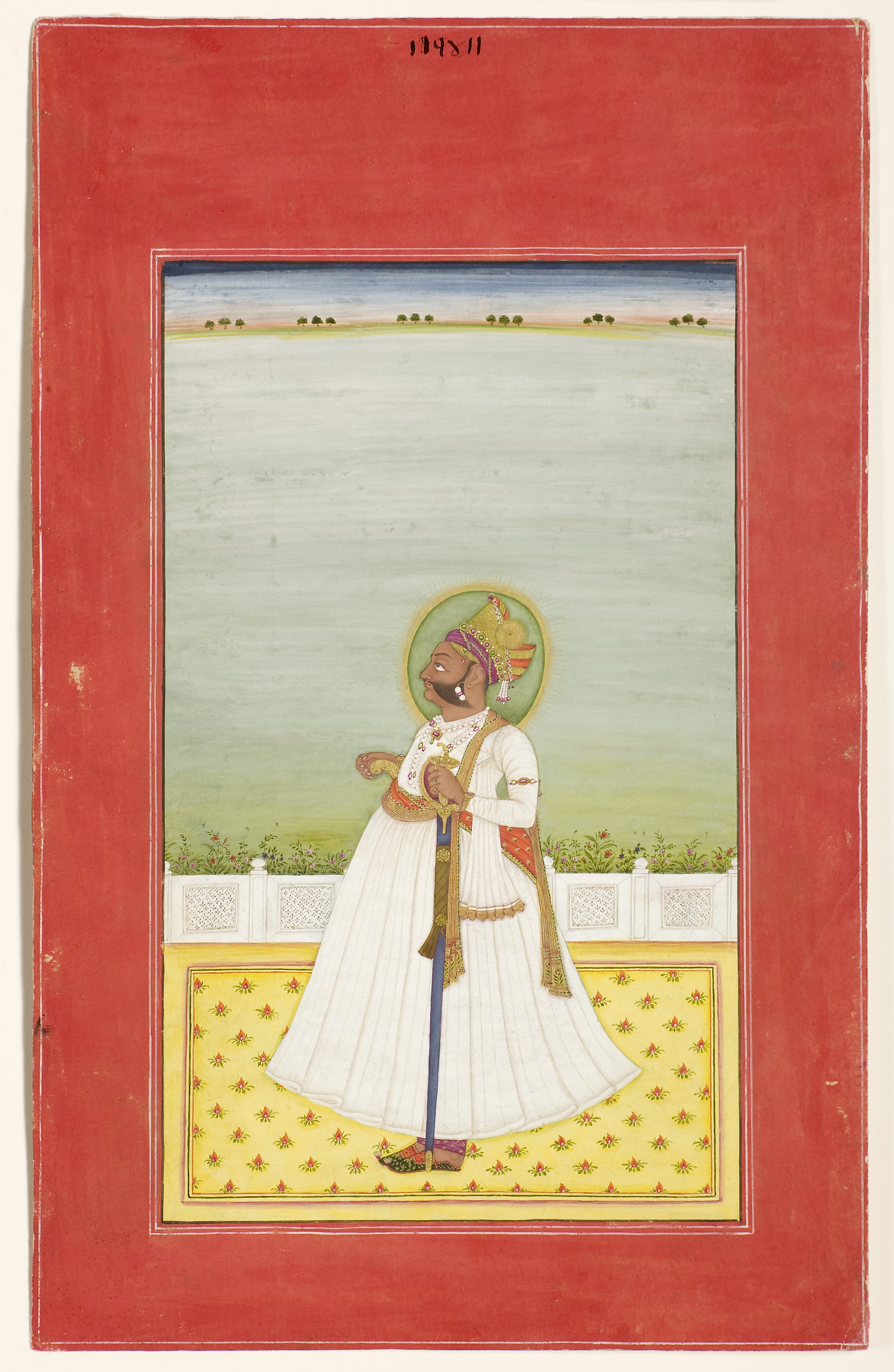
Gaj Singh

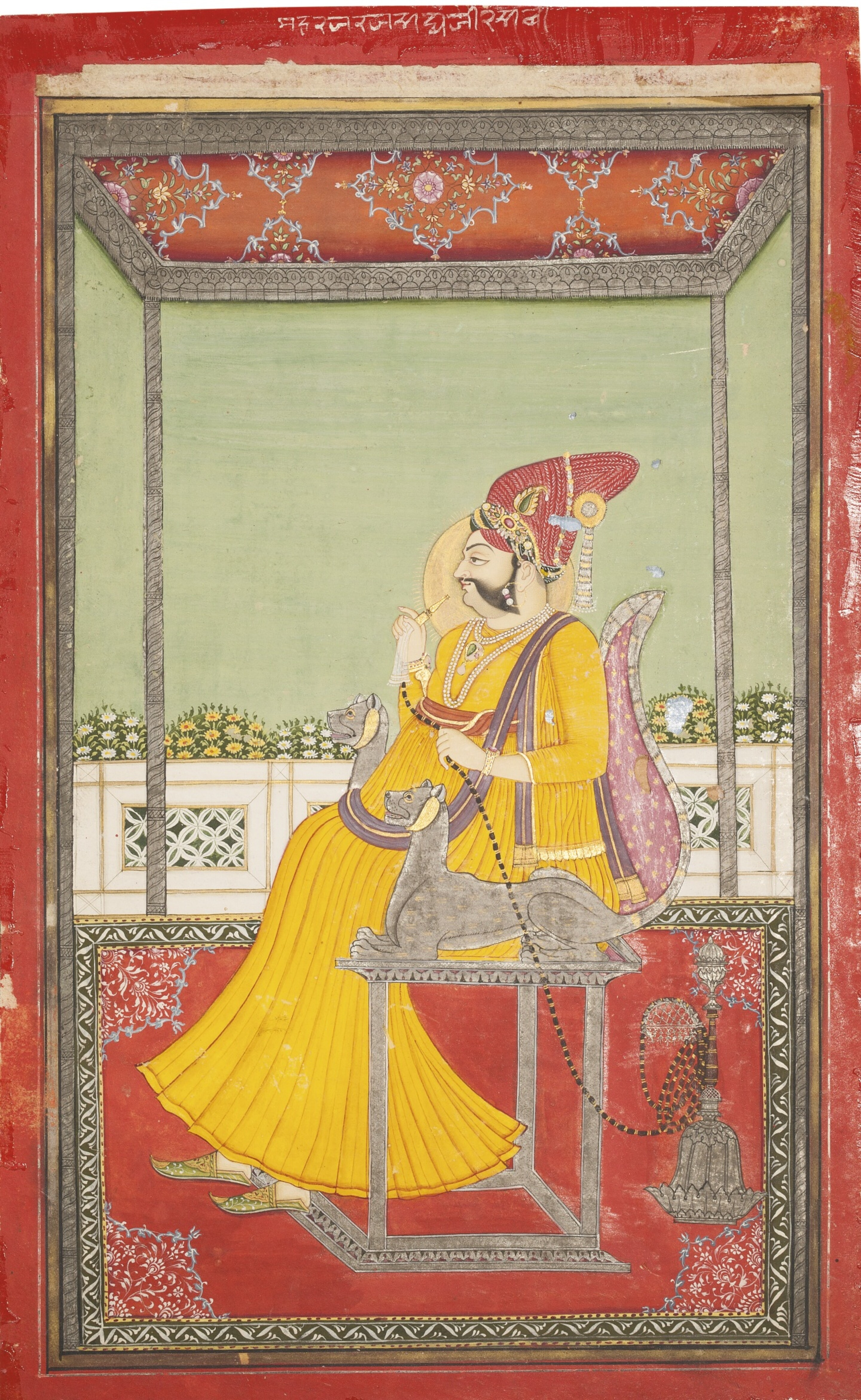
Surat Singh

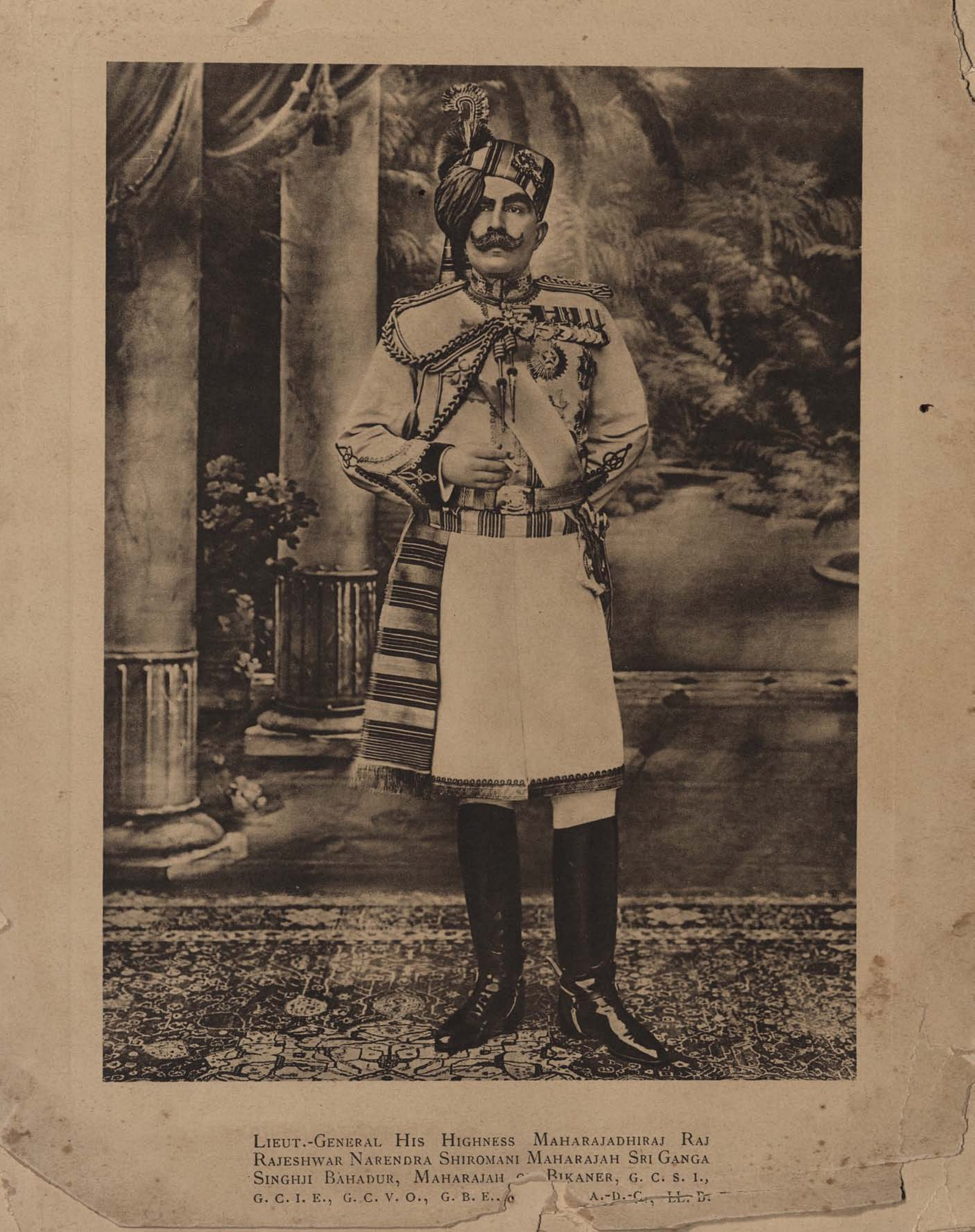
Ganga Singh

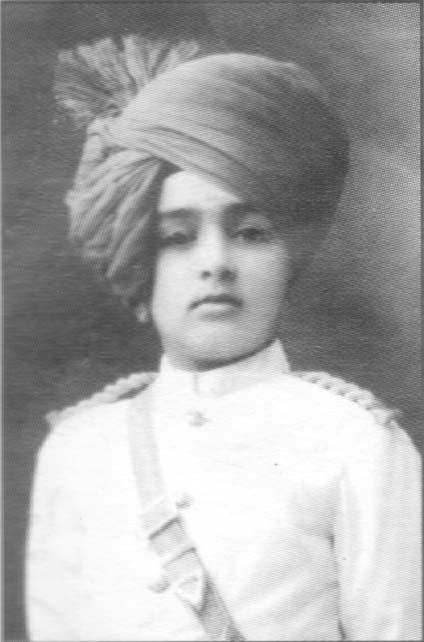
Karni Singh

=== Kishangarh ===
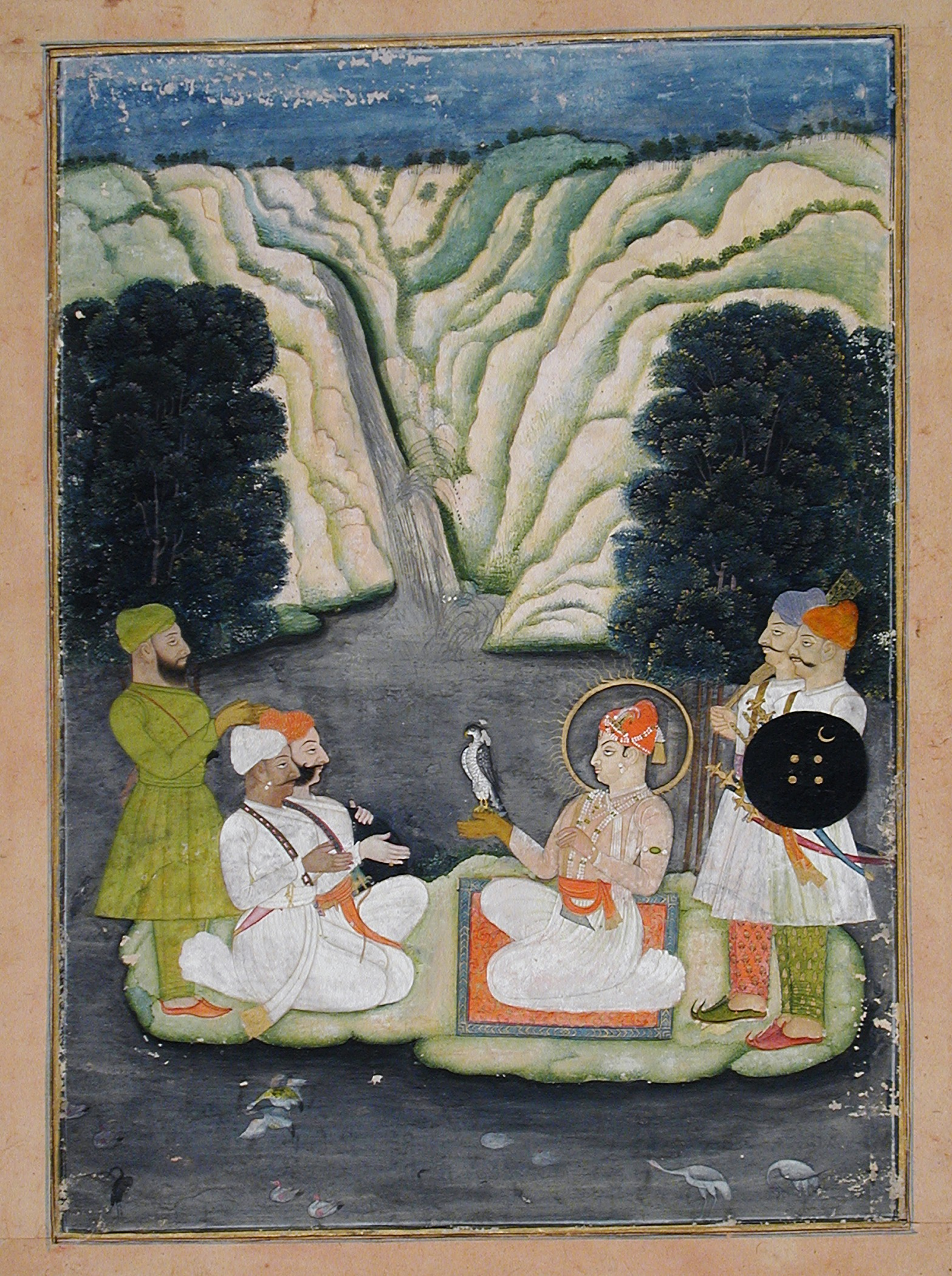
Kalyan Singh

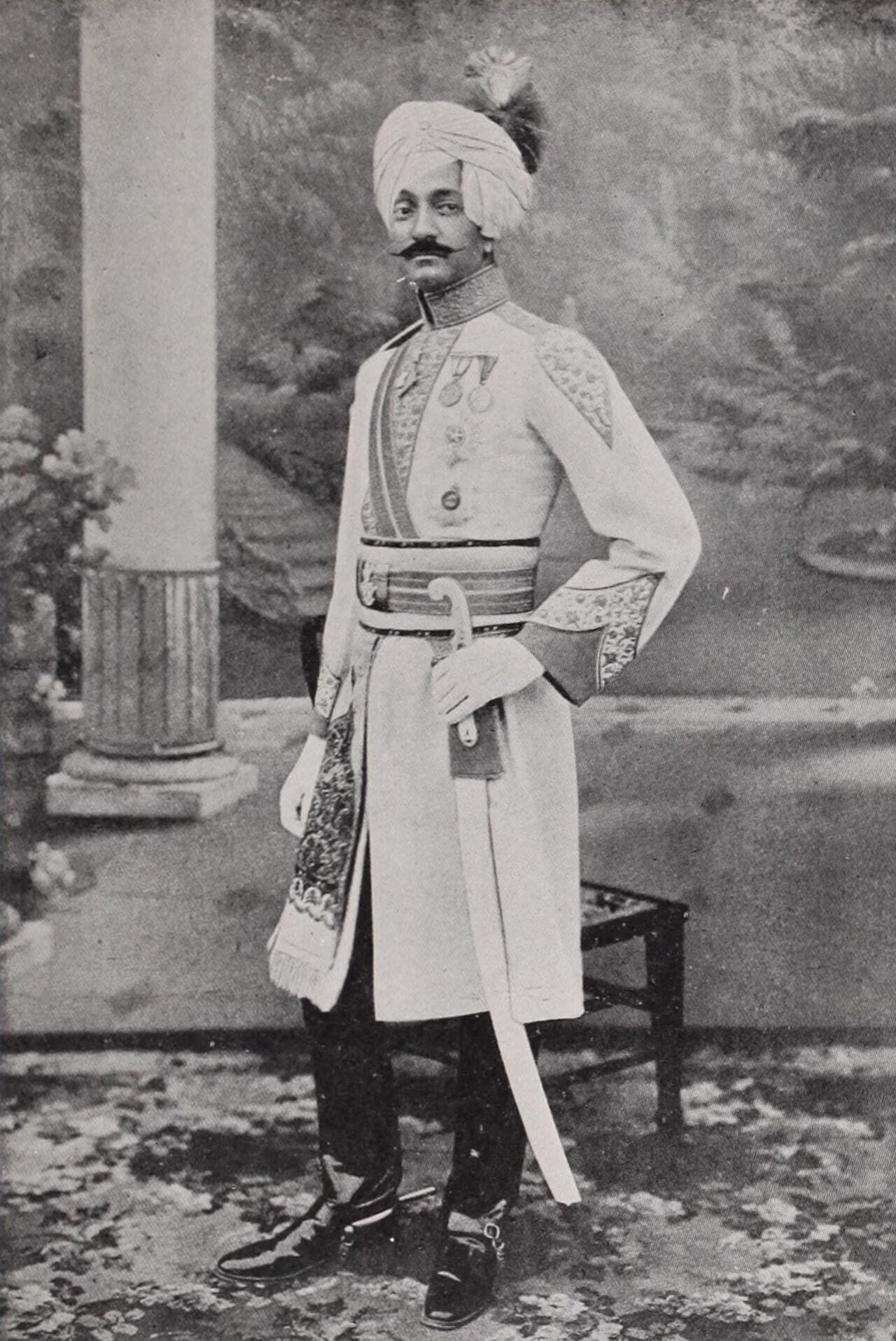
Madan Singh

=== Ratlam ===
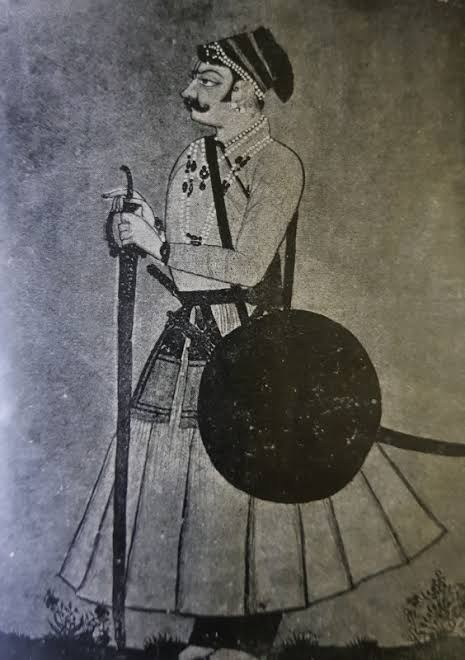
Ratan Singh

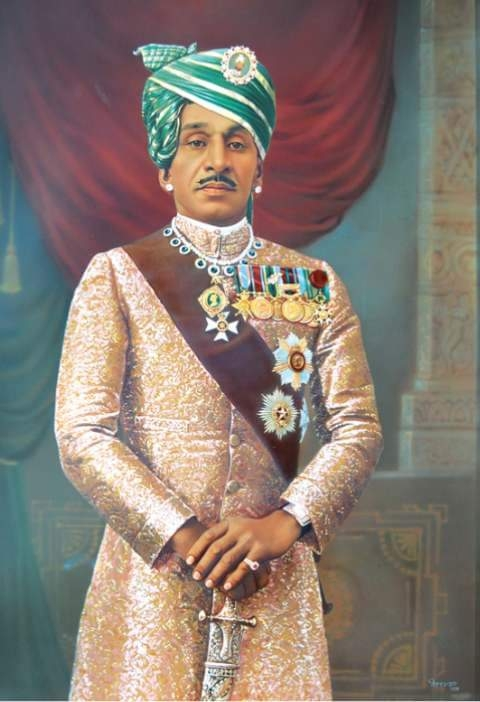
Sajjan Singh

=== Jhabua ===
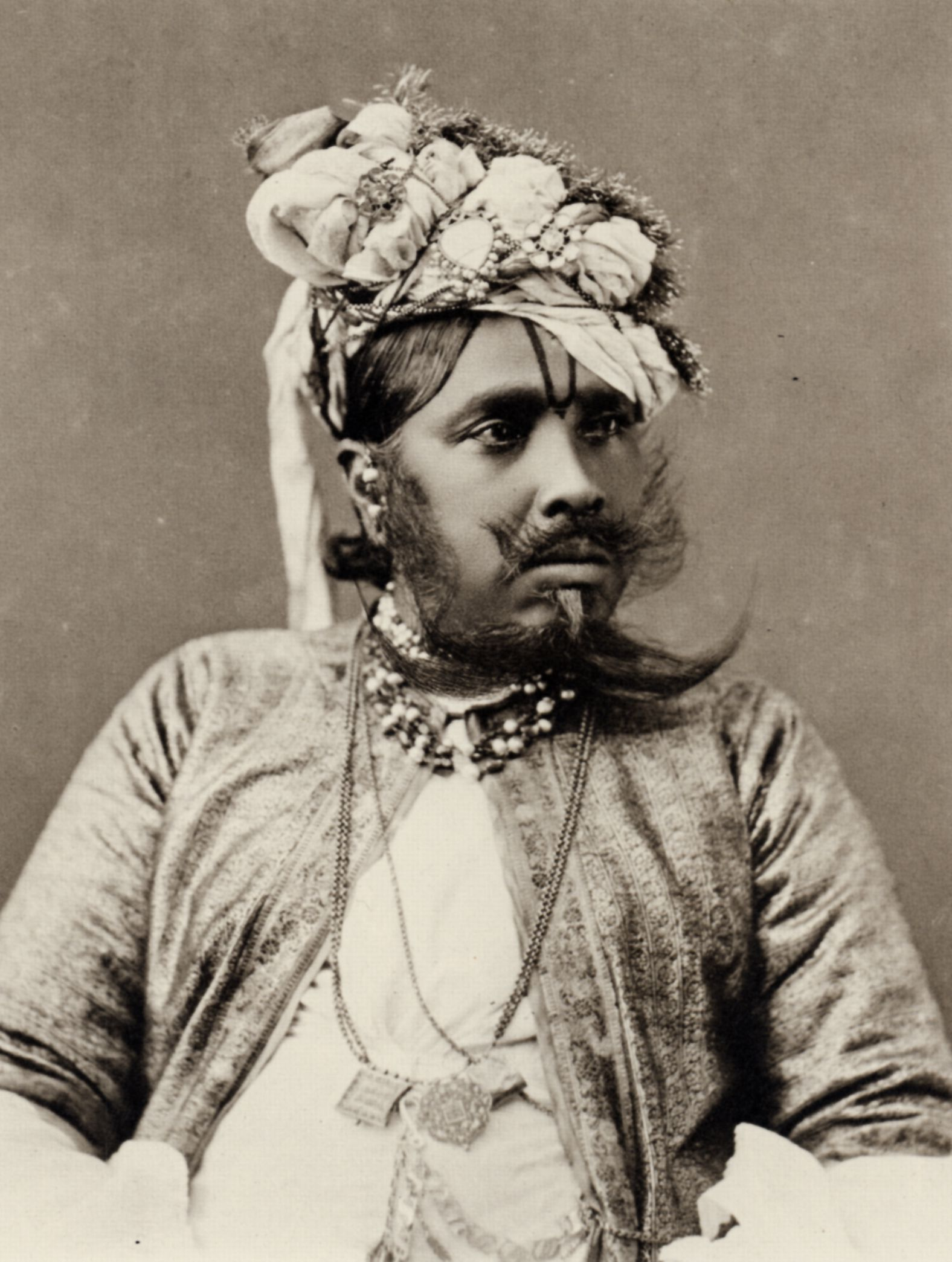
Gopal Singh

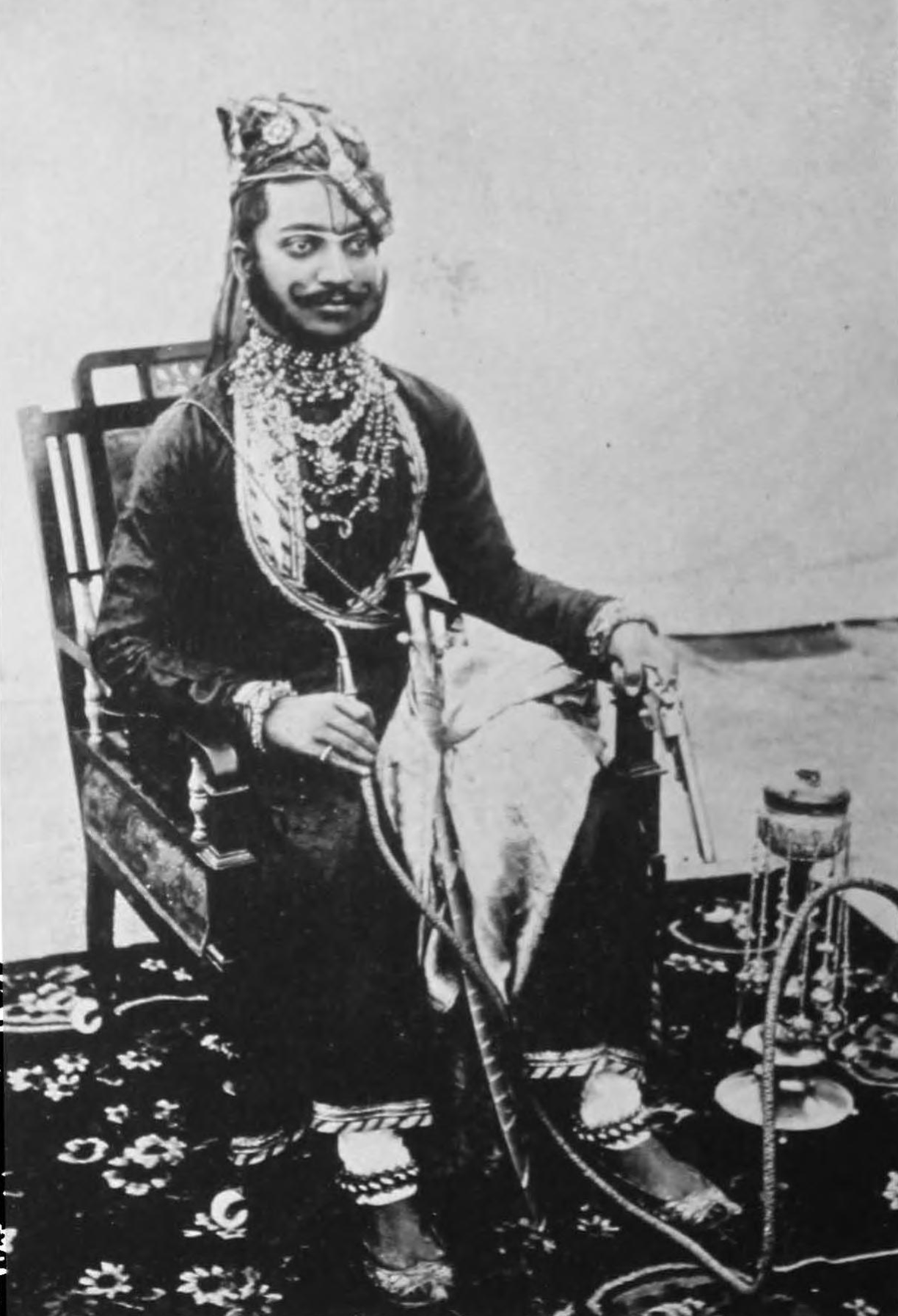
Udai Singh

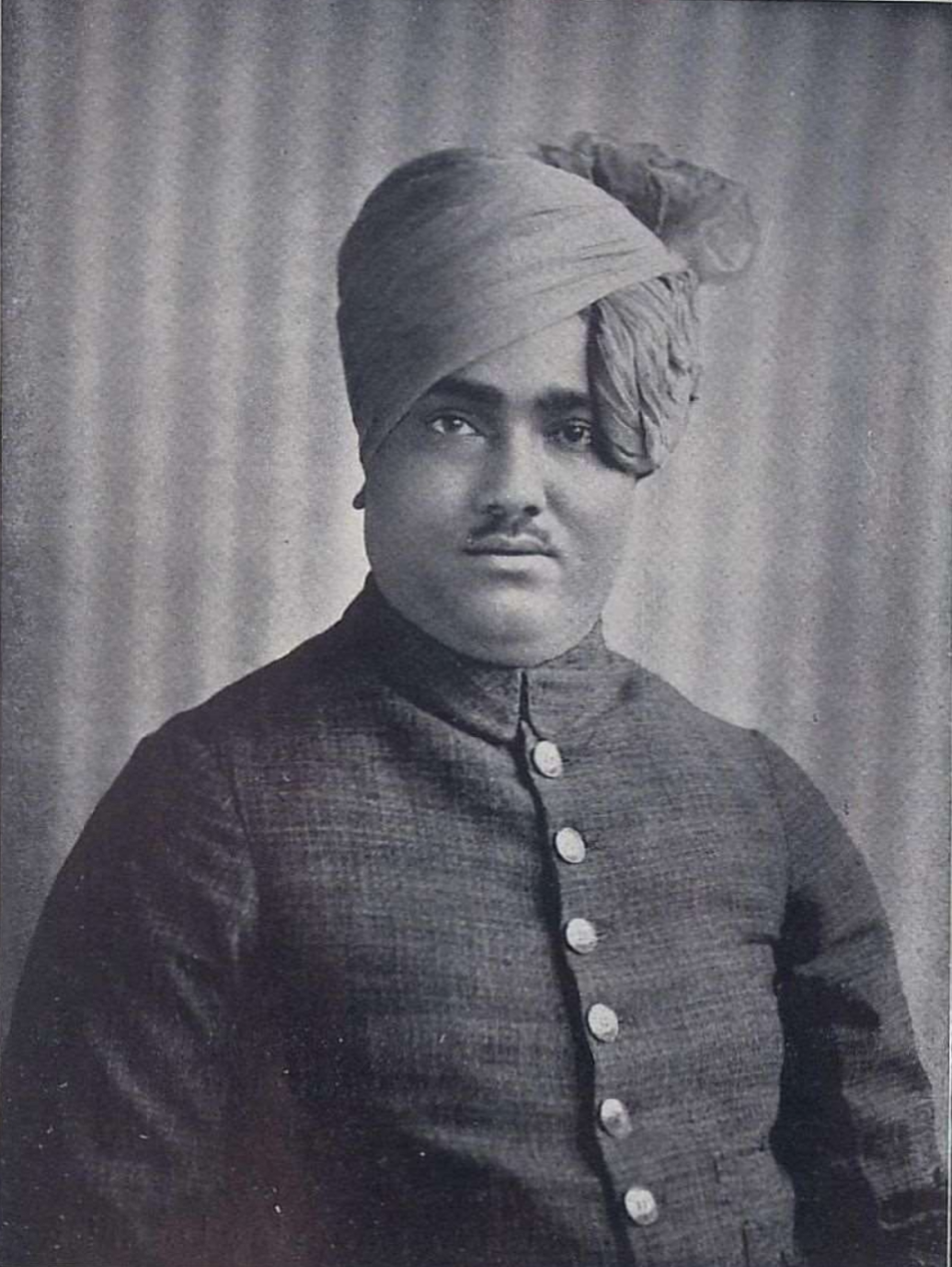
Dileep Singh

=== Sailana ===
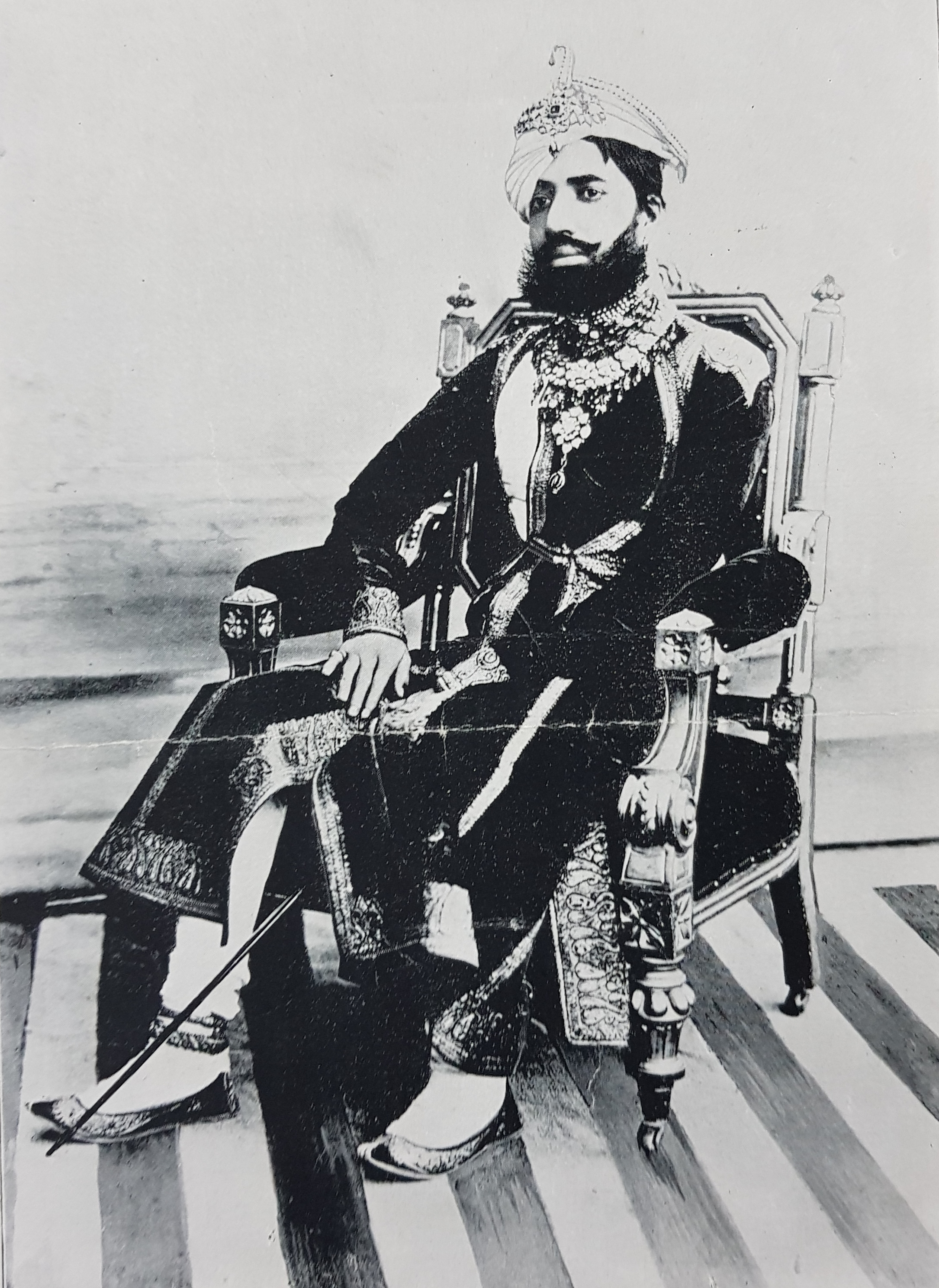
Jaswant Singh II

=== Idar ===
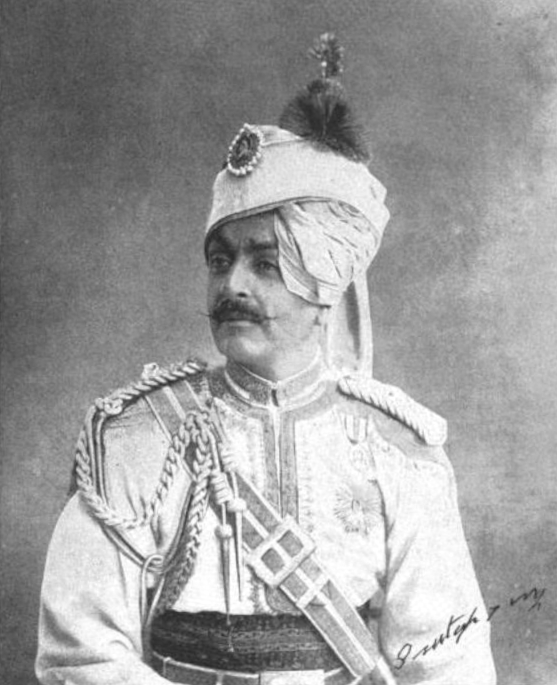
Pratap Singh

=== Saraikela ===
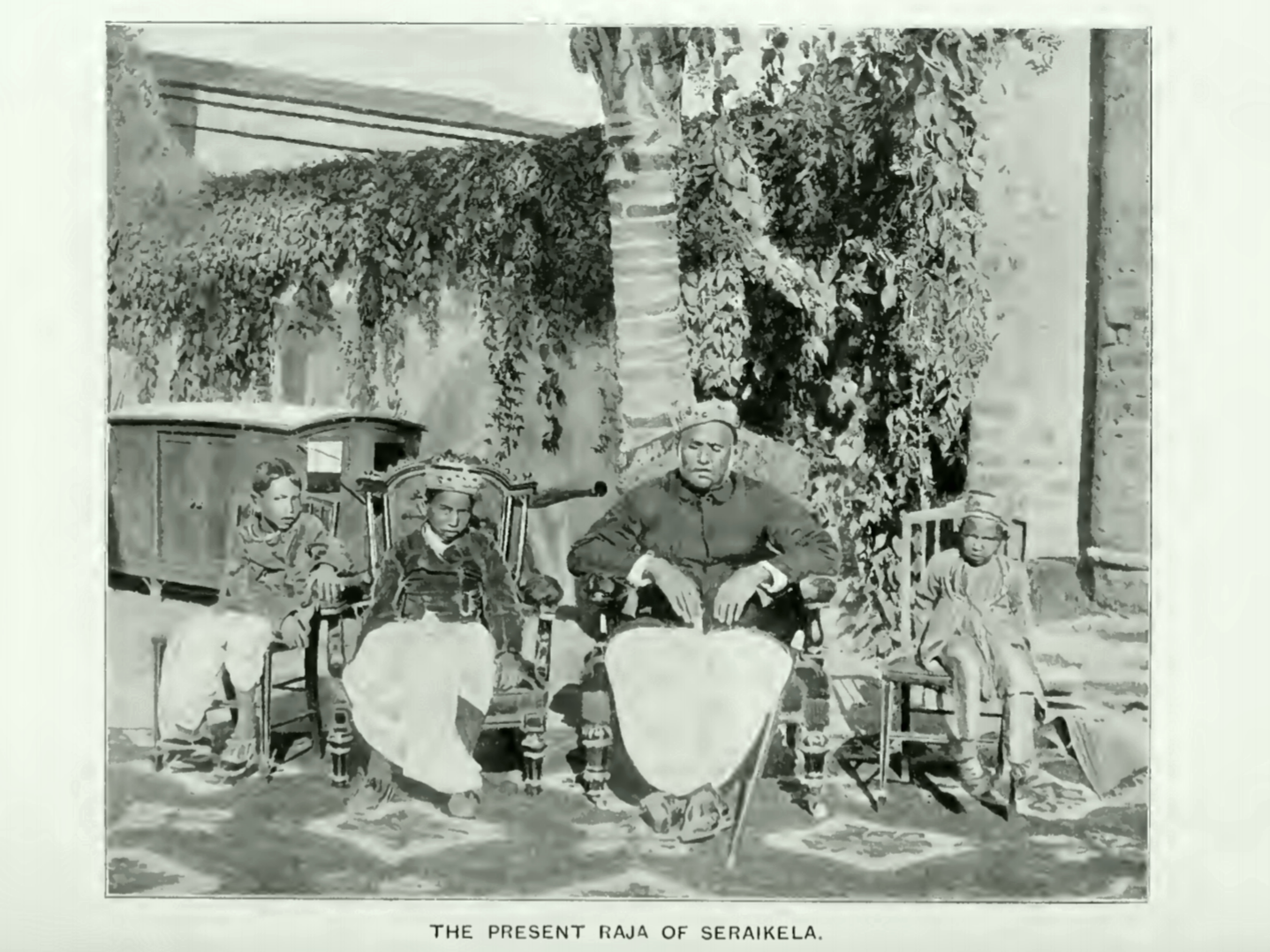
Udit Narayan Singh

== Beenkar Family ==
The beenkar family, an offshoot of the Rathore dynasty of Kishangarh, was founded by Naubat Khan, a Rudra veena player in the court of Akbar. Members of the family were important Hindustani musicians in the courts of Mughal Emperors.

=== Members ===
- Naubat Khan
- Lal Khan Gunsamundra
- Khushal Khan Gunsamundra
- Bisram Khan
- Bhupat Khan
- Sadarang
- Adarang
- Sidhar Khan
- Omrao Khan
- Ameer Khan
- Wazir Khan
- Dabir Khan
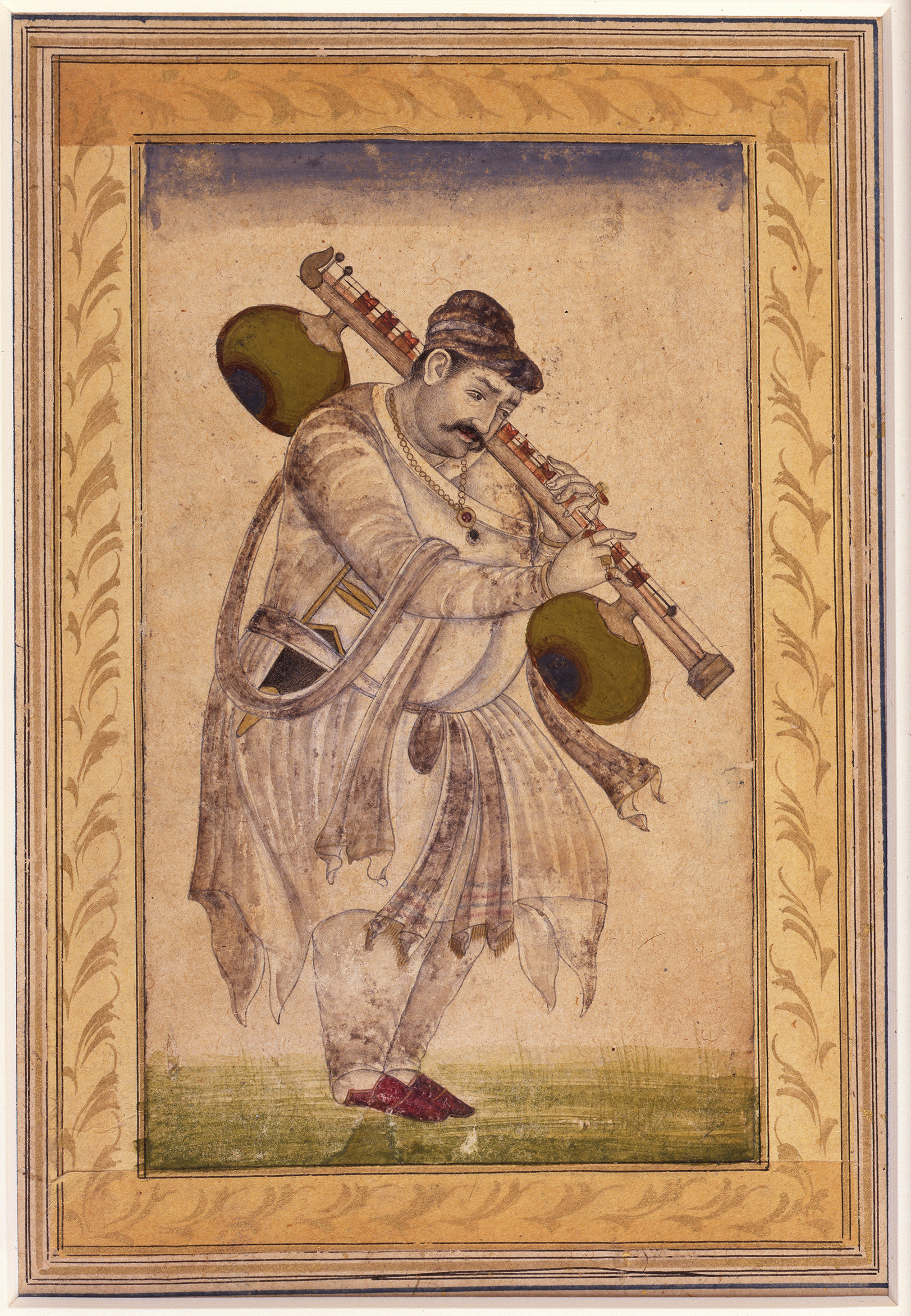
Naubat Khan

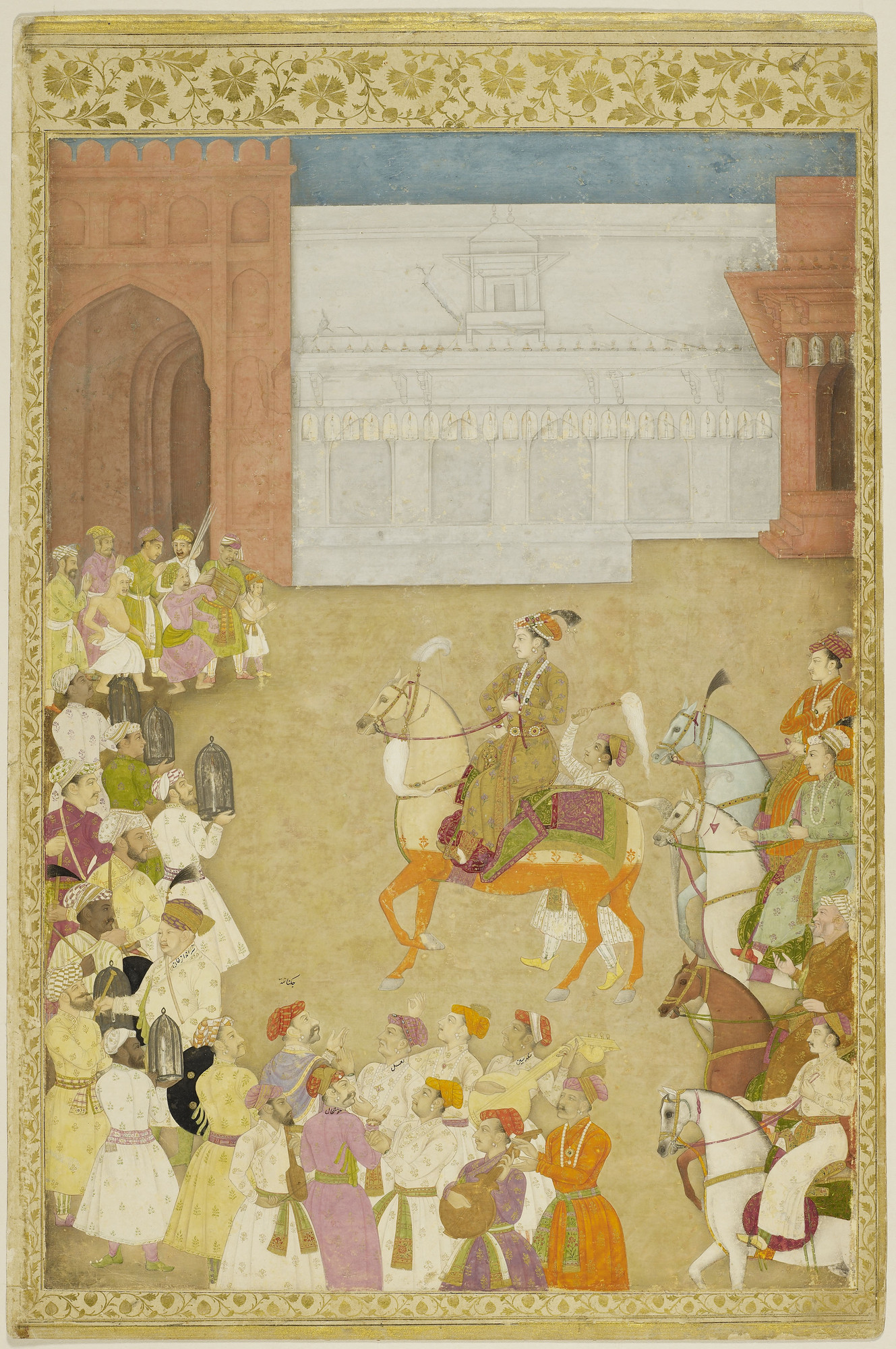
Lal Khan and Khushal Khan Gunsamundra

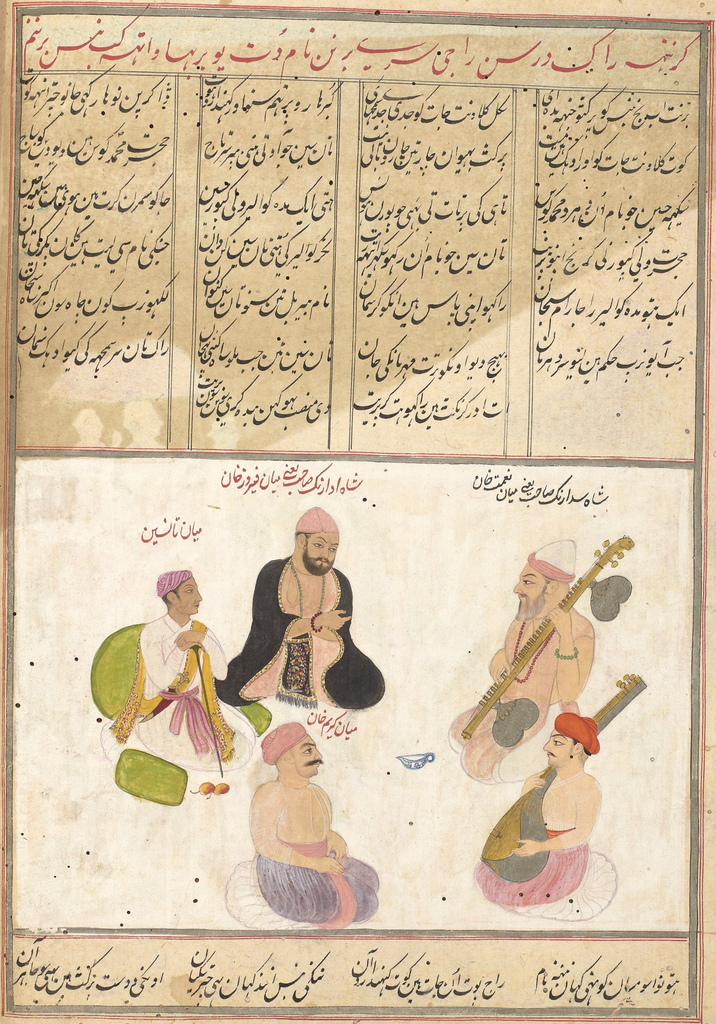
Sadarang

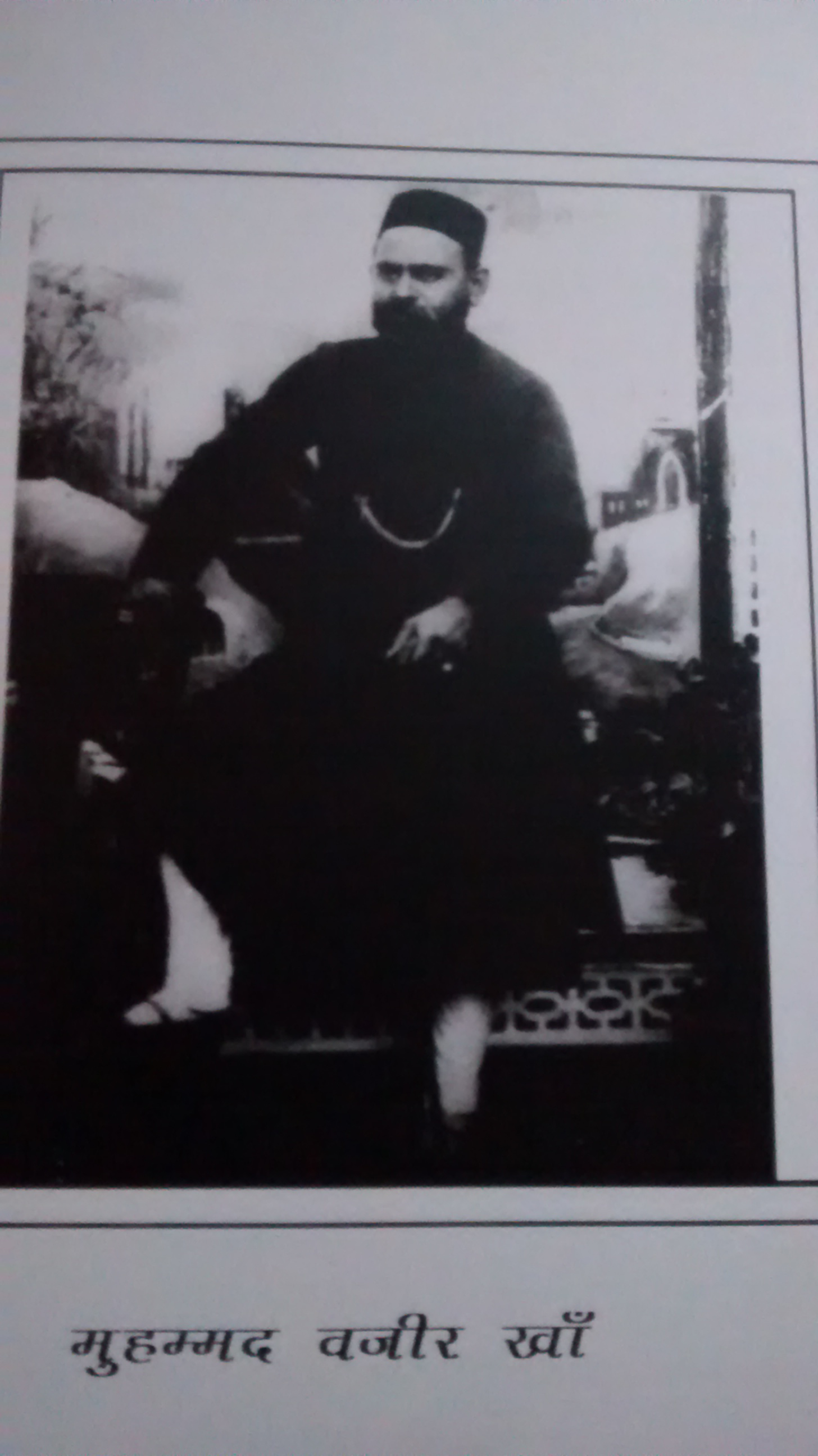
Wazir Khan

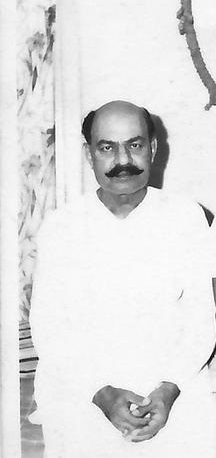
Dabir Khan

== Forts and Palaces ==
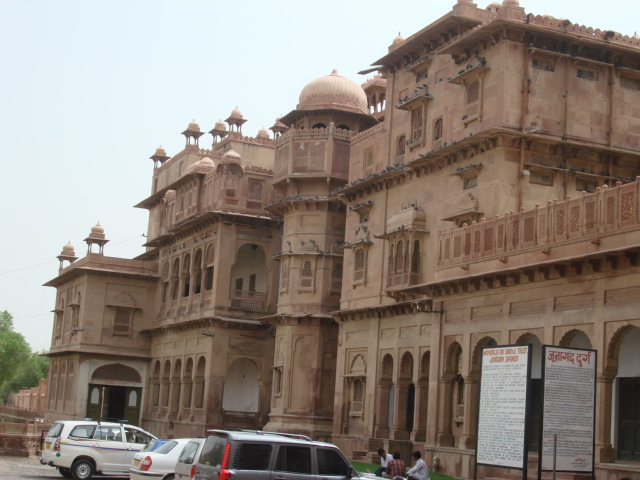
Mehrangarh

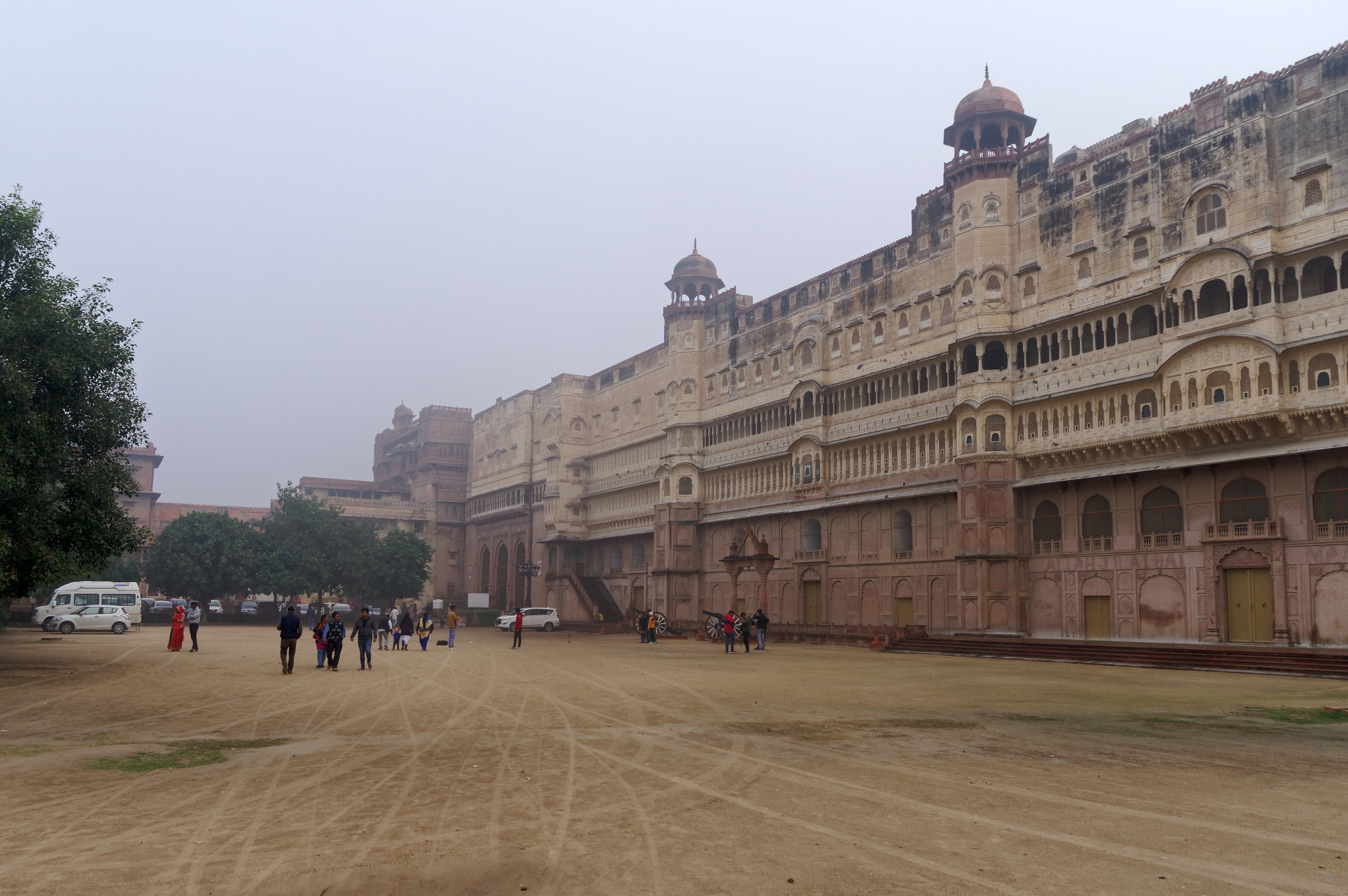
Junagarh Fort

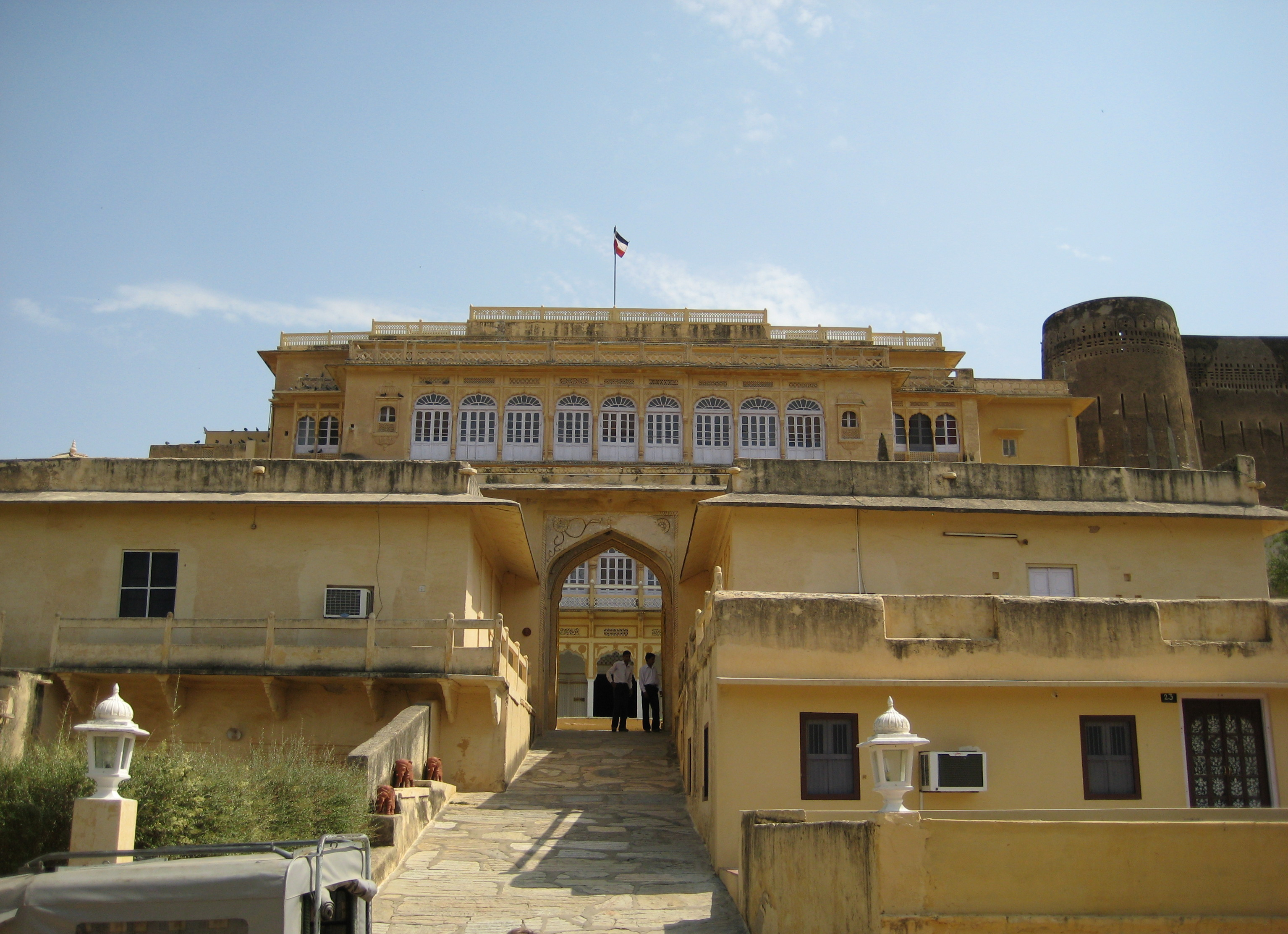
Roopangarh Fort

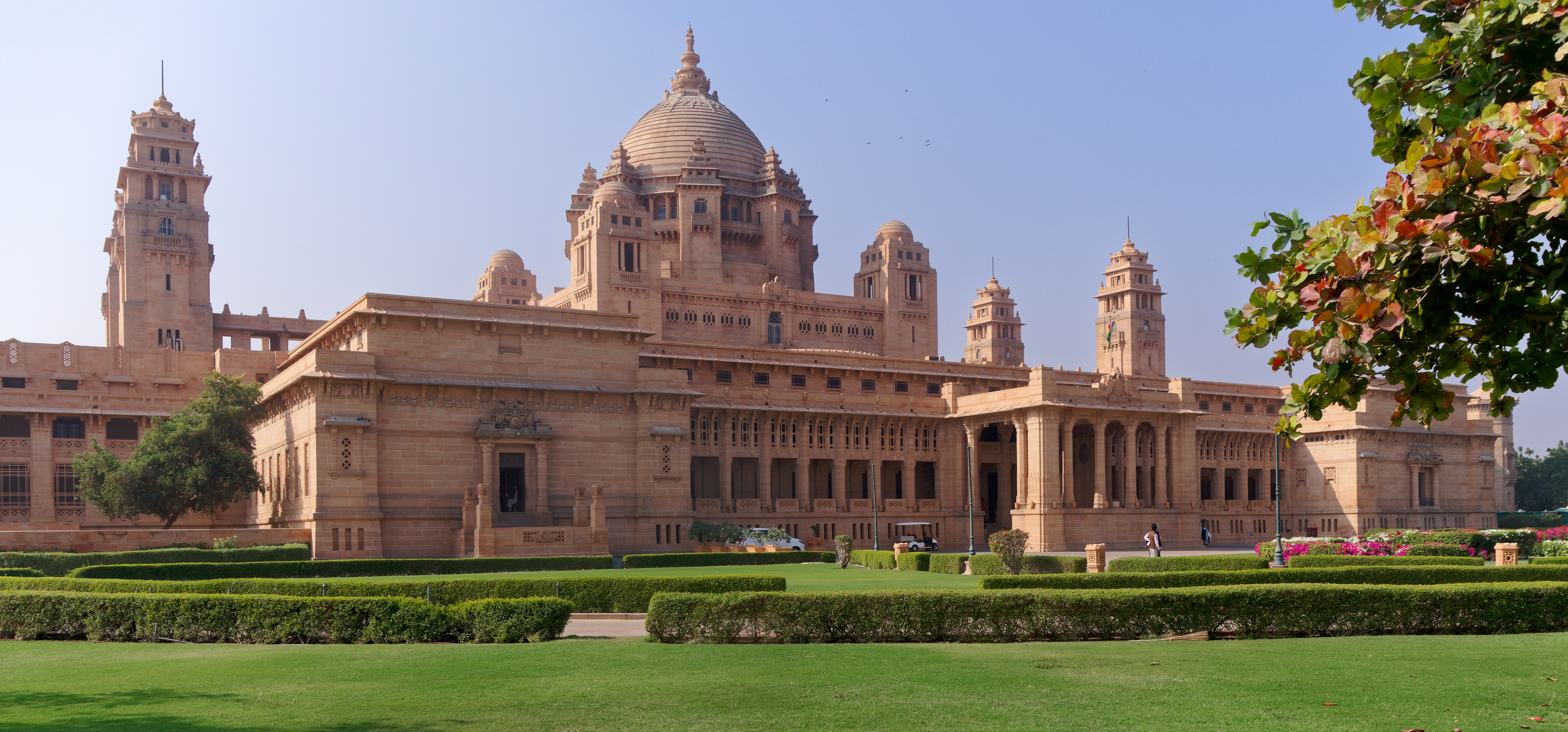
Umaid Bhawan Palace

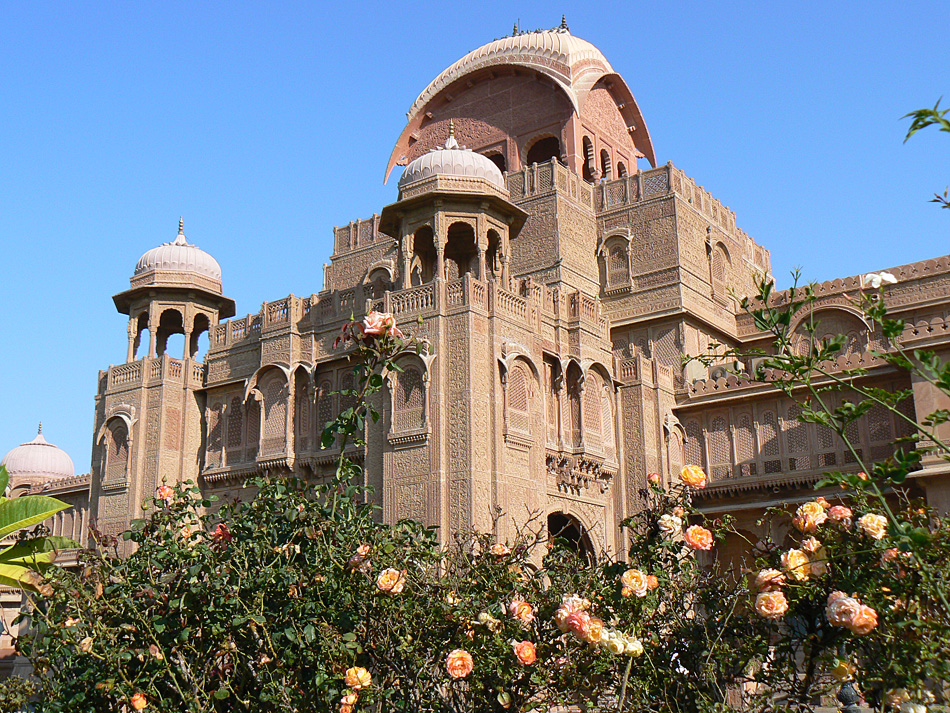
Lalgarh Palace

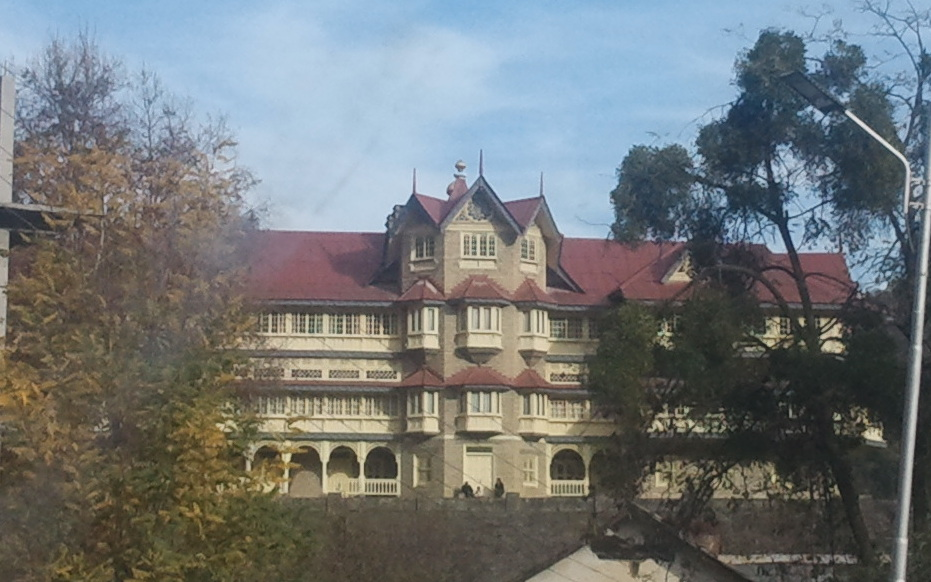
Jubbal Palace

== Flags ==
Flag	Kingdom
	Marwar-Jodhpur
	Bikaner
	Kishangarh
	Ratlam
	Jhabua
	Sitamau
	Sailana
	Alirajpur
	Idar
	Saraikela
	Kharsawan
	Vijaynagar (Pol)
	Valasna
	Malpur

== See also ==
- Rajput clans
- List of Rajput dynasties and states
- Marwar
