= Swami Swarupdas =

Dadupanthi saint-poet (1801–1863)

Swami Swami Swarupdas

Personal life
- Born: 1801 Badli, Ajmer region, Rajasthan, India
- Died: 1863 (aged 62) Ratlam, Malwa, India
- Notable work: Pandava Yashendu Chandrika
- Known for: Teaching Suryamall Misran, guru of Ratlam, Sailana, and Sitamau rulers

Religious life
- Religion: Dharma

Senior posting
- Teacher: Dadupanthi saint-poet
- Disciples: Shivaram Dadhich, Maharaja-Kumar Ratan Singh 'Natnagar', Bhairav Singh

Swami Swarupadas (1801–1863) was a Dadupanthi saint-poet, religious teacher, and reformer in Rajasthan and Malwa. He taught the famous poet and historian, Suryamall Misran and was also the guru of the rulers of Ratlam, Sailana and Sitamau States and was referred to as Annadata. He authored 12 major texts about philosophy, devotion, ethics; out of which his best known work is Pandava Yashendu Chandrika.

== Biography ==
=== Early life ===
His birth name was Shankardan. His father's name was Mishridanji and uncle's name was Paramanandji. The village of their ancestors, Kharoda, was located in the Umarkot district of the Dhat region (Sindh). His father and uncle both lived in Kharoda. It is said that once, Muslim raiders looted the village of Kharoda and inflicted a lot of suffering, due to which Mishridanji and Paramanandji decided to leave and migrated to Badli, a town in Ajmer region of Rajasthan. Paramanandji was a celibate, scholar, poet, and devotee of God. Dulhesingh, the Thakur of Badli, honored Paramanandji and persuaded both brothers to settle in Badli. Shankardan (Swarupdasji) was born here in Badli.

They initially intended to migrate to settle in their clan brothers' village near Badli, Daulatgadh. Paramanandji had even visited Daulatgadh, perhaps to adopt a son from his Detha clan brothers. Swami Swarupdasji prophesied that every third generation of his descendants would produce a saint and a poet, even if they were illiterate. This blessing is believed to continue today. So far, Sarjudasji and Sundardasji have become saints in the lineage of Swamiji. Currently, Sant Manohardasji is a saint.

At that time Maharaja Man Singh ruled in Jodhpur, who was considered unparalleled in his generosity and was captivated by the qualities of devotion and scholarship of the learned Charanas. When he came to rule the Jodhpur kingdom, to the 17 Charanas who came to his help during the siege of Jalore, he granted them lands and villages in sasan to appease them.

Paramanandji did not wish to be patronized by anyone, and his elder brother Mishridanji was neither a great scholar or a poet. Together with his brother, he thought that if his nephew Shankardan became a scholar and a poet, he could become eligible to receive a jagir (land grant) from Maharaja Man Singh or any other king.

With this thought in mind, Paramanand himself started teaching Shankardan from his childhood and made him proficient in the Sanskrit language. However, since Paramanand was himself a devotee of Lord Vishnu and a profound scholar of Vedanta along with being an expert in Sanskrit, his influence had a strong impact on young Shankardan. As a result, after completing his education, Shankardan found a Dadupanthi sage living in Devliya, became his disciple and took renunciation with the name 'Swarupdas'.

Seeing his vision for his nephew's future come to fail, Paramanandji was very saddened and wrote many letters to Shankardan. He himself went to convince him to return but did not succeed because Shankardan had developed a strong sense of renunciation. After remaining unsuccessful in his efforts, a few days later, Paramanandji died.

=== Life as renunciate ===
Afterwards, Swarupdas primarily resided in Malwa, although he also temporarily stayed in Ajmer. Maharaja Balwant Singh (1882-1914) of Ratlam held him in high regards as his guru, resulting in Swamiji frequently residing in Ratlam.

Besides Ratlam, Swarapdas was also greatly esteemed at Sitamau and Sailana. Maharaja-Kumar Ratan Singh 'Natnagar' (1865-1920) of Sitamau, who himself was a good poet, considered Swamiji his guru. Ratan Singh had unparalleled devotion towards him and considered him to be the incarnation of God. Even in official affairs, he gave precedence to Swamiji's advise and would touch his feet in reverence. Swarupdas had a significant influence on the entire life of Maharaja-Kumar. Even when Swamiji was on a journey outside Sitamau, their correspondence would continue, mostly in the form of poetic letters from both sides. In his book Natnagar Vinod, Ratan Singh did not praise God in the mangalacharan but rather praised his guru Swarupdas, as he considered him to be a siddha person and an incarnation of God.

In the Guru Vandana chapter of Vansh Bhaskar, Suryamal writes about his guru Swarupdas from whom he had studied yoga, the extremely difficult poetry style of Mammat, various non-dualistic Vedanta scriptures, as well as Nyaya and Vaisheshika philosophy texts from childhood. Suryamal greatly respect for Swamiji throughout his life. Swarupdas was very generous-minded, who understood the essence of knowledge, saw that his student Suryamal had surpassed him with his extraordinary talent and thus developed a great admiration for him in his heart. In one of his letters to Suryamal in 1846, Swarupdas expressed his admiration and called Suryamal 'supreme among the learned'.

One of Swamiji's disciples was the poet Shivaram Dadhich, who wrote a treatise called "Takhat Vilas" in 1899. In its mangalacharan (auspicious introduction), he composed hymns of praise to his guru Swarupdasji, in which he remembers and praises him with great reverence.

=== Death ===
The heir of Balwant Singh of Ratlam, Bhairav Singh was also a disciple of Swarupdas. In 1863, both Ratan Singh of Sitamau and Bhairav Singh of Ratlam died on the same night. Swarupdas was greatly pained by this unfortunate event. When Raja Raj Singh, father of prince Ratan Singh, informed Swamiji of the incident, Swamiji was numbed and only replied, "Ratna should have waited, I was also ready to go with him." Some time later, in 1864, Swarupdas died in Ratlam.

The Dadu-Dwara of Ratlam, located near Tripolia, was the residence of Swami Swarupdas. His disciple Kishandas expanded this building in 1860. It was at this place Swami Swarupdas spend his last days. In 1864, a cenotaph (chhatri) was built as a memorial to him.

== Works ==
His works include philosophy, faith, ethics, self-realisation etc. His composed texts are:

- Pandava Yashendu Chandrika (Rajasthani Mahabharata)
- Rasa Ratnakar
- Varnartha Manjari
- Vritti Bodh
- Hrinayananjan
- Tarka Prabandha
- Drishtanta Dipika
- Sadharanopadesha
- Sukshimopadesha
- Aviek Paddhati
- Pakhand Khandan (Pakhand Pradhvansh)
- Chijjada Bodhpatrika
