= Laxman Singh =

Last ruling Maharawal of Dungarpur from 1918–1949

HH Maharawal Sir Lakshman Singh
- Maharawal of Dungarpur

Maharawal of Dungarpur
- Reign: 1918–1949
- Predecessor: HH Maharawal Sir Bijay Singh
- Successor: Mahipal Singh

Speaker of Rajasthan Legislative Assembly
- Reign: 1977–1979
- Predecessor: Ram Kishore Vyas
- Successor: Gopal Singh
- Born: 7 March 1908; Udai Vilas Palace, Dungarpur Dungarpur State, Rajputana, British Raj
- Died: 6 June 1989 (aged 81); Udai Vilas Palace, Dungarpur, Rajasthan, India
- Spouse: HH Maharaniji Sa Bisenji Shri Brajraj Kanwarji of Bhinga Estate HH Maharaniji Sa Rathorji Shri Manhar Kanwarji of Kishangarh State
- Issue: Mahipal Singh Maharajkumarji Jai Singh Maharajkumarji Raj Singh Maharajkumariji Baiji Lal Rajendra Kanwarji m.to Thakore Saheb Dharmendra Sinhji of Muli State Maharajkumariji Baiji Lal Sushila Kanwarji m.to HH Maharaja Karni Singh of Bikaner State Maharajkumariji Baiji Lal Hemant Kanwarji m.to HH Maharana Prithviraj Sinhji of Danta State Maharajkumariji Baiji Lal Krishna Kanwarji m.to HH Raja Lalit Sen of Suket State
- Dynasty: Guhila dynasty
- Father: HH Maharawal Sir Bijai Singh
- Mother: HH Maharaniji Sa Rathorji Shri Devendra Kanwarji Saheba d.of HH Maharaja Sir Jashwant Singh II of Sailana State

HH Rai-e-Rayan Mahi Mahendra Maharajadhiraj Ravi Kula Bhushan Shri Shri 108 Maharawal Sir Lakshman Singh Bahadur GCIE, KCSI (7 March 1908 – 6 June 1989), was the last ruling Ahar Guhilot Maharawal of the Princely State of Dungarpur from the year 1918 to 1989, a former MP in the Rajya Sabha and speaker of the Rajasthan Legislative Assembly from July 1977 to June 1979.

== Early life ==
Maharawal Sir Lakshman Singh was born on 7 March 1908 at Udai Villas, Dungarpur, the eldest son and heir apparent of Maharawal Sir Bijai Singh of the princely state of Dungarpur. He was the elder brother of Nagendra Singh, later the President of the International Court of Justice.

In November 1918, during the influenza pandemic, both Lakshman Singh and his father contracted the disease; though Singh survived, his father developed double pneumonia and died. As a result, he succeeded to the throne at the age of 10, ruling under the regency of the Dungarpur political agent until he came of age in 1928.

== Political career ==
From 1931 to 1947, Lakshman Singh was a member of the standing committee of the Chamber of Princes, and was knighted as a Knight Commander of the Order of the Star of India (KCSI) in the 1935 King's Birthday and Silver Jubilee Honours. On 14 August 1947, he was appointed as the last Knight Grand Commander of the Order of the Indian Empire (GCIE). Following Independence, he established an interim legislature for Dungarpur, then with his fellow rulers formed the United State of Rajasthan on 25 March 1948. The following year, this became the Greater Rajasthan Union to which Dungarpur acceded on 30 March. From 1952 to 1958, Sir Lakshman served as an MP for Aspur in the Rajya Sabha, then became President of the Swatantra Party in Rajasthan from 1961 to 1969. From 1962 until his death, he also served as President of the All-India Kshatriya Mahasabha and as an MLA for Chittor in the Rajasthan Legislative Assembly, serving as speaker from 1977 to 1979; he also served as the leader of the Opposition from 1962 to 1979. He also served as president of Akhil Bharatiya Kshatriya Mahasabha from 1960 till his death.

== Personal life ==
On 8 February 1920 at Benares, Lakshman Singh married Biswanji Maharani Shri Brijraj Kunwari Ba Sahiba of Bhinga (1907–1982); the couple had two daughters. On 8 March 1928, he married Rathorji Maharani Shri Manhar Kunwar Ba Sahiba of Kishangarh (1914–1975); the couple had three sons and two daughters. His youngest son Raj Singh Dungarpur was a president of Board of Control for Cricket in India.

== Later life ==
Despite being officially deprived of his titles as a monarch by the Indira Gandhi government in 1971, Sir Lakshman continued to serve in politics to the end of his days. He died while in office at his birthplace, Udai Villas at Dungarpur, on 6 June 1989 after a reign of 71 years, aged 81. At the time of his death he was also the second-to-last surviving Knight Grand Commander of the Order of the Indian Empire (Chithira Thirunal of Travancore would die two years later). Lakshman Singh was succeeded as titular Maharawal of Dungarpur by his eldest son, Mahipal Singh.

== Titles ==
- 1908–1918: Maharajkumar Shri Lakshman Singh Sahib Bahadur, Yuvaraja of Dungarpur
- 1918–1935: His Highness Rai-i-Rayan, Mahimahendra, Maharajadhiraj Maharawal Shri Lakshman Singh Sahib Bahadur, Maharawal of Dungarpur
- 1935–1947: His Highness Rai-i-Rayan, Mahimahendra, Maharajadhiraj Maharawal Shri Sir Lakshman Singh Sahib Bahadur, Maharawal of Dungarpur, KCSI
- 1947–1989: His Highness Rai-i-Rayan, Mahimahendra, Maharajadhiraj Maharawal Shri Sir Lakshman Singh Sahib Bahadur, Maharawal of Dungarpur, GCIE, KCSI

== Honours ==
- King George V Silver Jubilee Medal-1935
- Knight Commander of the Order of the Star of India (KCSI)-1935
- King George VI Coronation Medal-1937
- Indian Independence Medal-1947
- Knight Grand Commander of the Order of the Indian Empire (GCIE)-1947
