= Ram Singh of Sitamau =

Raja of Sitamau from 1900 to 1967

Ram Singh
- Raja

Raja of Sitamau
- Reign: 21 November 1900 – 25 May 1967
- Coronation: 21 November 1900
- Investiture: 28 February 1905
- Predecessor: Shardul Singh
- Successor: Krishan Singh
- Born: 2 January 1880
- Died: 25 May 1967 (aged 87)
- Wives: Chauhaniji; Rajawatiji; Batianiji
- Issue: Raghubir Singh; Govind Singh; Raghunath Singh; Chand Kanwar; Kishan Kanwar
- Father: Dalel Singh

Sir Ram Singh KCIE was the Raja of Sitamau from 1900 until his death in 1967.

== Early life, family, and education ==
He was born on 2 January 1880, as the second son of Dalel Singh, the Thakur of Kachhi Baroda. He was educated at Daly College in Indore, where he remained for nearly seven years. When he left the school, he went to Bharatpur. There, under the tutelage of Michael O'Dwyer, who was acting as a settlement officer, he learned about land tenures, revenue, and other matters connected with the management of estates. He was married three times and had three sons and two daughters. He married, firstly, in 1902 to a daughter of the Raja of Chhota Udaipur; secondly, in 1903 to a daughter of the Thakur of Baleri in Bikaner; and thirdly to a granddaughter of the Thakur of Maroli in Udaipur. His wives were: Chauhaniji, Rajawatiji and Batianiji, respectively. His sons were Raghubir Singh, Govind Singh, and Raghunath Singh. His daughters were Chand Kanwar and Kishan Kanwar.

== Succession ==
When Shardul Singh died without an heir to succeed him as the Raja of Sitamau on 10 May 1900, the Government of India selected Ram Singh as his successor. He was installed on the vacant throne by the political agent in Malwa on 21 November 1900, in the absence of the agent to the governor-general in Central India, who was unable to attend the ceremony. As during the reign of his predecessor, the state had encountered a terrible famine, to combat which it had to take a loan of 1,25,000 rupees, and still, the state's condition had not improved. The government, in consideration of this, took only 40,600, or half a year's net income, as nazrana and made it payable in four installments. They also presented him with a khilat valued at 10,125 rupees at his installation, in the form of a deduction from the nazrana. As he was a minor at the time, the administration of the state on his behalf was carried out by the state's dewan, Pandit Balwant Rao Trimbak. He was invested with full ruling powers on 28 February 1905.

== Reign ==
During his reign, Sitamau became a seat of learning and culture. Following India's independence in 1947, he signed the instrument of accession and the standstill agreement, through which he acceded his state to the Dominion of India. Upon the formation of Madhya Pradesh, Sitamau was merged into it, and he handed over his state's management to the newly formed state government on 20 June 1948. His privy purse was 58,000 rupees, of which 48,000 rupees were dynastic and 10,000 rupees were personal.

== Personal life ==
He was a good poet and encouraged his children and others to take part in literary activities. He personally taught his children English.

== Death ==
He died on 25 May 1967, and was succeeded by his grandson, Krishan Singh, as the Raja of Sitamau.

== Honours ==
He was invested with the insignia of Knight Commander of the Order of the Indian Empire by George V on the occasion of the Delhi durbar of 1911.

Country	Year	Honour	Class/Grade	Ribbon	Post-nominal letters
United Kingdom	1911	Order of the Indian Empire	Knight Commander		KCIE
