= Multhan =

Village in Madhya Pradesh, India

Coordinates: 22.0147°N 75.7475°E

Multhan is a village in the Dhar district of Madhya Pradesh.

== School's in Multhan ==
Government Higher Secondary School, Jahwar Navoday Vidhyalay, Bharat Vidhiya Niketan

== History ==
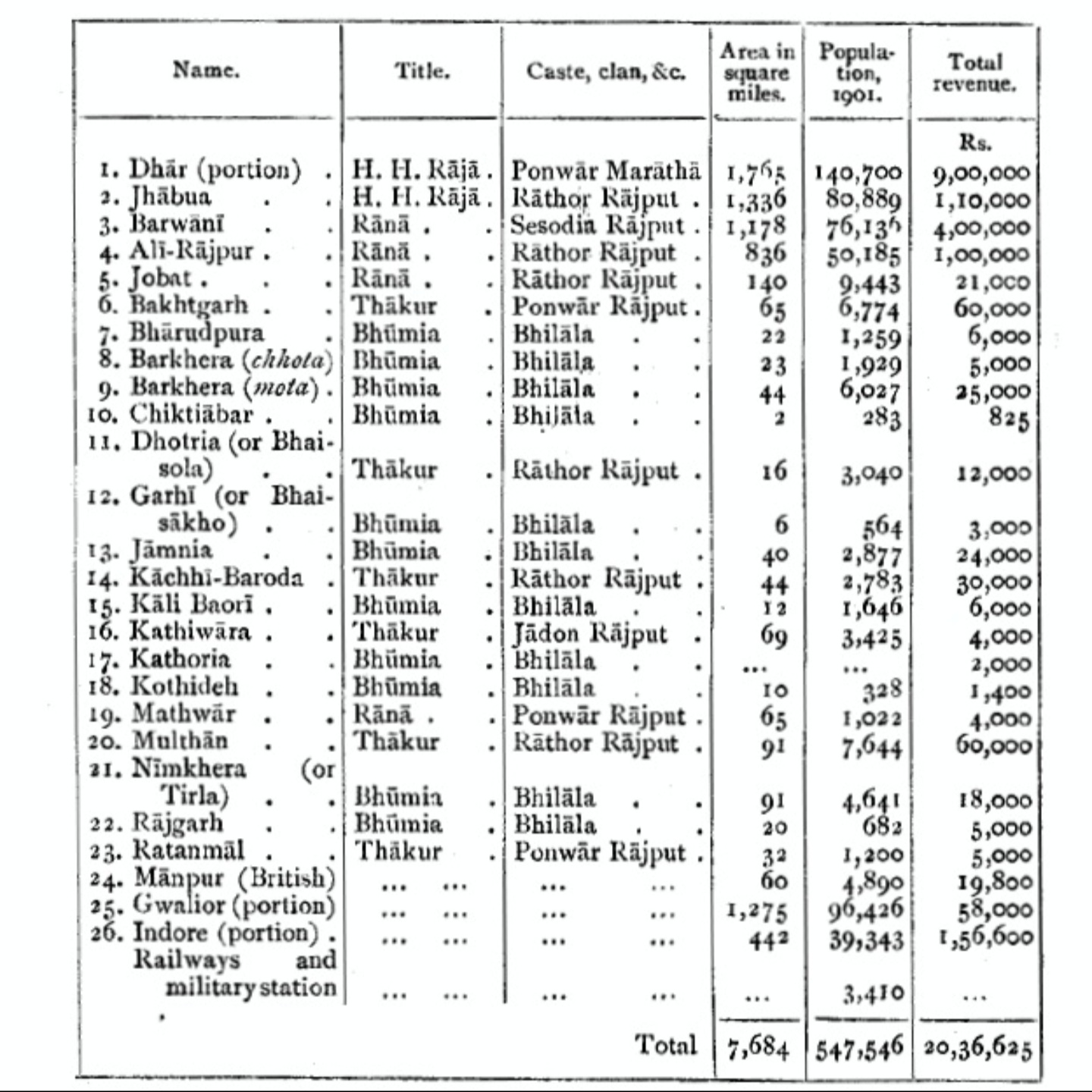
Multhan and the Bhopawar agency

During British Raj, the State was in the Badnawar pargana. The chief was a Rathore rajput, had the title of thakur. Bharat Singh, who was born in 1893 and succeeded on adoption in 1901, was the second son of Raja Jashwant Singh II of Sailana State. The residence of the chief is the town of Multhan. Area 91 square miles. Population was 7,644.

== Rulers ==
| Name | Year |
|---|---|
| Maharaj Sakat Singh Ji | 1657 - 1691 |
| Maharaj Anup Singh ji | 1691 - 1709 |
| Maharaj Indra Singh ji | 1709 - 17.. |
| Maharaj Raj Singh ji | 17..–17.. |
| Maharaj Roop Singh ji | 1756–... |
| Maharaj Chhatra Singh ji | ...–... (7 years) |
| Maharaj Anand Singh ji | ...–... |
| Maharaj Lakshman Singh ji | ...–... |
| Maharaj Sawai Singh ji | 1810 - 1849 |
| Rajmata Wagheliji Man Kunwar (regent) | 1849 |
| Maharaj Dalpat Singh ji | 1849 - 1900 |
| Interregnum | 1900 - 26 August 1901 |
| Maharaj Bharat Singh ji | 26 August 1901-1947 |
| Maharaj Rameshwar Singh ji | 1971–1973 |
| Maharaj Raghuveer Singh ji | 1973 - present |

== External links and sources ==
- WorldStatesmen - India - princely States K-Z

Specific
