= Raoti =

Raoti Rawati, Rawti
- town
- Location in Madhya Pradesh, India Raoti (India)
- Coordinates: 23°13′41″N 74°50′34″E
- Country: India
- State: Madhya Pradesh
- District: Ratlam
- Established: 1636

Government
  - Type: panchayat

Population (2015)
  - Total: 8,000

Languages
  - Official: Hindi
- Time zone: UTC+5:30 (IST)
- PIN: 457769
- Telephone code: 07413
- ISO 3166 code: IN-MP
- Vehicle registration: MP
- Nearest city: Ratlam Sailana Bajna
- Sex ratio: 51%/49% ♂/♀
- Vidhan Sabha constituency: 217

Raoti or Rawati is a town and tehsil of Ratlam district in the Indian state of Madhya Pradesh. It was once a part of the Sailana State It falls in the Malwa region of Madhya Pradesh.

== History ==
Raoti was founded in the year 1635–1636, when the new Maharaja Ratan singh came to the throne of Ratlam State. It passed on to a descendant called Pratap Singh. Raja Pratap singh killed his elder brother Raja Keshri Singh of Ratlam and conquered Ratlam and Dhamnod. Pratap Singh was then killed by Keshri Singhs younger son Jai Singh at the battle of Sagode. Who then became Raoti's ruler in 1716. Raoti was the capital of Sailana State until Raja Jai Singh decided to build a new capital. He constructed Sailana as his new capital in 1736. Raja Jai Singh then gave Raoti to a Rathore of the Prithvirajot branch. This family ruled for many generations, one of the thakuranis also built a temple outside the garhi at the cost of Rs.5,000. The Prithvirajot line of Raoti went extinct due to no successors. After which Raja Jaswant Singh of Sailana gave Raoti to one of his younger sons. Raoti was a 1st class thikana of Sailana State. A small fortified palace still exists in Raoti.

== Geography ==
Raoti is located at 23.2333°N 74.8333°E. It has an average elevation of 377 m (1,237 ft). It is 25 km (16 mi) west from Ratlam by road and 307 km (191 mi) from the state capital Bhopal

There is a dam and large pond near Raoti named Saroj Sarowar bandh (also known as Dholawad dam). which is 6 km (3.7 mi) by road.

== Demographics ==
Raoti's total population as per the provisional population data for census 2011 is reported to be 4,948. Males constitute approximately 51% of the population and females 49%

== Transport ==
=== Railways ===
Raoti Rail Station (RTI) is situated 27 km (17 mi) from Ratlam Junction on Ratlam-Godhra section of Western Railways. Not many trains stop at Raoti stations except for few long distance and local trains. Station is 6 km (3.7 mi) away from the town, however transportation is generally available for commuters.

=== Roads ===
Raoti is 34 km (21 mi) from Ratlam via Shivgarh and 25 km (16 mi) via Morwani by road. Raoti is now well connected to nearby towns and villages, due to the Pradhan Mantri Gram Sadak Yojana and NREGA.

== Educational institutions ==
- Government primary school
- Government middle school
- Government higher secondary school
- Government Girl's primary school
- Government Girl's middle school
- Government Girl's higher secondary school
- Shri Jain public school
- Shri Sant Jamnadas public school
- Government Degree College Mela Ground Raoti Ratlam
