= Raghubir Sinh =

Indian politician

Raghubir Singh
- Born: 23 February 1908
- Died: 21 February 1991 (aged 82)
- Spouse: Mohan Kumari
- Father: Ram Singh
- Military career
- Allegiance: British Raj
- Branch: British Indian Army
- Years of active service: 1941–1945
- Rank: Major (1942–1945); Captain (1941–1942)
- Unit: Observer Crops

Raghubir Sinh

Member of Parliament, Rajya Sabha
- In office 1952–1960
- Constituency: Madhya Pradesh

Personal details
- Born: 23 February 1908
- Party: Indian National Congress

Raghubir Sinh (Raghubir Singh) was an Indian Rajkumar of Sitamau, historian then politician. Later in life he was a Member of Parliament, representing Madhya Pradesh in the Rajya Sabha the upper house of India's Parliament as a member of the Indian National Congress.

== Birth ==
He was born on 23 February 1908, at Laduna Palace in Sitamau to Ram Singh, the Raja of Sitamau.

== Education ==
He received his primary education at home and later attended Shri Ram High School in Sitamau for his middle school education. He enrolled at Daly College, Indore, in 1920 but had to withdraw after a few months due to illness. In 1924, he passed the matriculation examination of Bombay University from Baroda High School as a private candidate. He later completed the intermediate examination in 1926, also as a private candidate. He did his B.A. in 1928. Thereafter, he joined Holkar College in Indore and earned his LL.B. from Agra University in 1930. He passed his M.A. in history from Agra University in 1933. He conducted his research on Malwa in Transition, 1698–1766 under the guidance of Jadunath Sarkar and earned a D.Litt. from Agra University in 1936. He received his military training in Indore from 1940 to 1941.

== Career ==
He taught at Shri Ram High School, Sitamau, from 1926 to 1928 and again from 1930 to 1933. He was appointed as a judge of the High Court of Sitamau in 1932 and served in this role until 1940. In 1934, he was given charge of the Sitamau state's departments of revenue, education, police, health, and local self-government. He remained in charge of these departments until 1938. He was commissioned as a Captain in the Observer Corps of the Indian Army in 1941 and was promoted to Major in 1942. He resigned his commission and retired from the army in 1945.

== Personal life ==
He married Mohan Kumari of Pratapgarh on 2 December 1929 and had four children with her: two sons and two daughters.

== Death ==
He died on 21 February 1991.
