= Jashwant Singh II =

Raja of Sailana from 1895 to 1919

- Raja
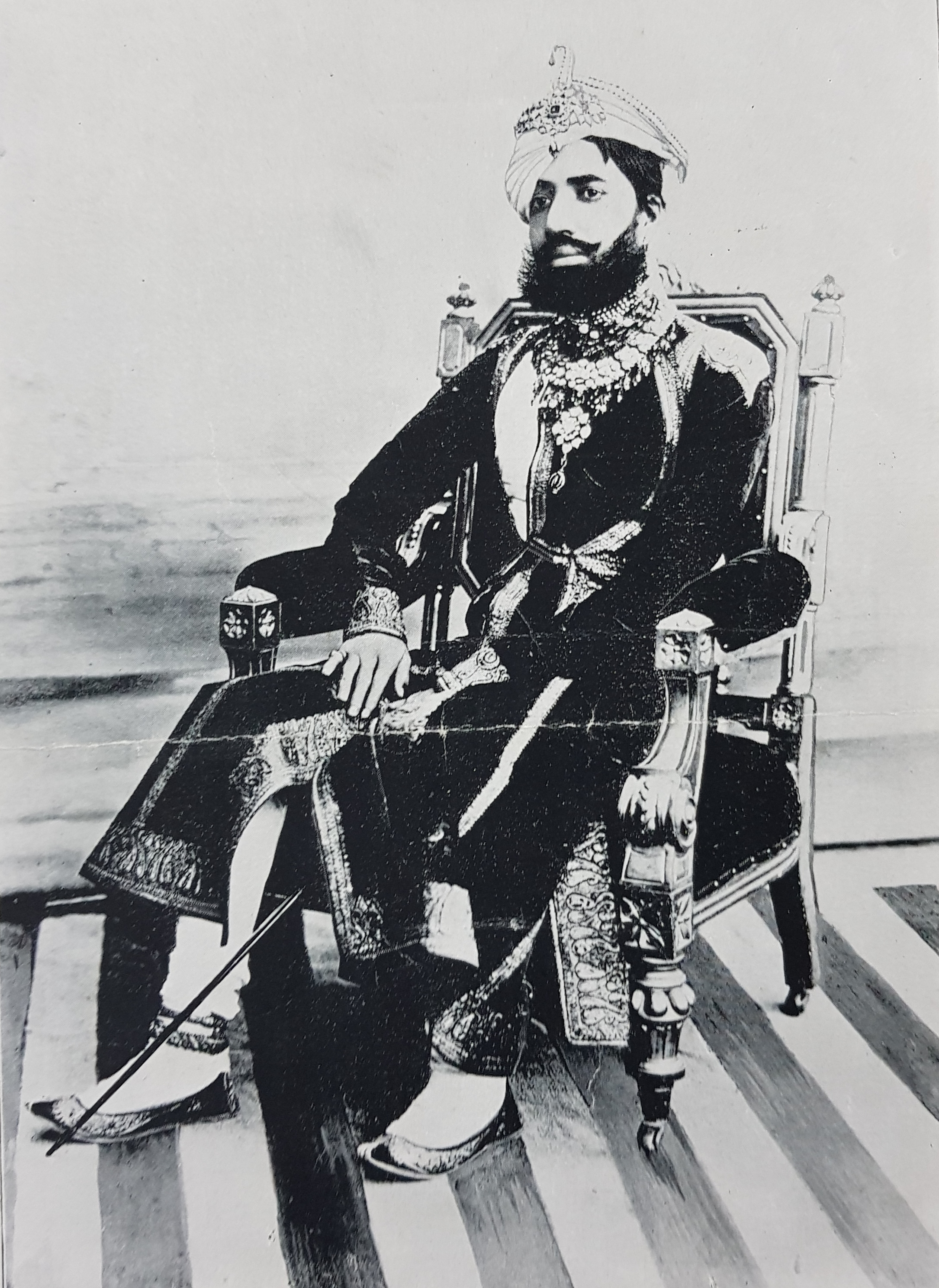

Raja of Sailana
- Reign: October 1895 – 13 July 1919
- Predecessor: Duleh Singh
- Successor: Dileep Singh
- Born: 3 September 1864
- Died: 13 July 1919 (aged 54)
- Spouse: Bhatianiji; Kachhawaiji; Ranawatiji; Sisodniji
- Issue: Dileep Singh; Bharat Singh; Mandhata Singh; Ramchandra Singh; Ajatshatru Singh; Devendra Kanwar; Shiva Kanwar; Lakshmi Kanwar
- House: Sailana
- Dynasty: Rathore
- Father: Bhawani Singh (biological); Duleh Singh (adoptive)
- Religion: Hinduism
- Education: Daly College

Sir Jashwant Singh II (or Jaswant Singh II) KCIE (1864–1919) was the Raja of Sailana from 1895 until his death in 1919.

== Early life, education, and family ==
He was born on 3 September 1864 to Bhawani Singh, the Jagirdar of Semlia. He received his early education in the vernacular and Sanskrit from Bhawani Singh. Later, he was sent to Daly College in Indore for his further studies. He was proficient in Persian. In 1884, he was adopted by Duleh Singh, the Raja of Sailana. In the same year, the Government of India approved his adoption. He married four times. He first married Bhatianiji, the daughter of the jagirdar of Barodia under Ratlam, in 1882. She died in 1898. In 1888, he married Kachhawaiji, the daughter of the Raja of Machhand under Gwalior. In the same year, he married Ranawatiji, the daughter of the Rao of Dhariawad. He married Sisodniji, the daughter of the Rana of Barwani, in 1895.

He had six sons and five daughters of whom one son and two daughters died in infancy. His sons were Dileep Singh, Bharat Singh, Mandhata Singh, Ramchandra Singh, and Ajatshatru Singh. Dileep was his heir and successor. Bharat was adopted in Multhan and succeeded there in 1901. Mandhata was granted an estate of Adwaria which consisted of three villages. He was later granted the jagir of Raoti. Ramchandra was given the jagir of Kaneri. Ajatshatru received Advani, Govindpura, and other villages as his appanage. He had houses built for each of his sons. Both Mandhata and Ajatshatru left Sailana in 1919 due to a conflict with their elder brother and moved to Bikaner.

His daughters were Devendra Kanwar, Shiva Kanwar, and Lakshmi Kanwar. Devendra Kanwar was married to Bijai Singh, the Maharawal of Dungarpur. Shiva Kanwar was married to Arjun Singh, Raja of Narsinghgarh, and Lakhsmi Kanwar was married to Durjan Sal, Rao of Khilchipur.

== Succession ==
Following the death of Duleh Singh in October 1895, he became the Raja of Sailana. He was installed on the throne by David Barr on 24 December 1895 and was simultaneously granted full administrative powers. On the occasion, the Raja of Ratlam presented claims regarding the ceremony of Talwar Bandhai, but they were rejected.

== Reign ==
One of the first challenges he faced upon his succession was that his predecessor had left the state with a heavy debt and the affairs of state were in disarray. He made considerable efforts to improve the financial condition of the State and nearly paid off its debt. However, the Indian famine of 1899–1900 caused a setback, and the State had to take another loan of 100,000 Rs. He paid off the entire state debt. He reorganized each department to align with modern requirements. He organized the state police and established permanent Courts of Justice. He was invited to attend the Delhi Durbar on 1 January 1903 but did not attend due to state obligations. He constructed Jaswant Niwas at a cost of 200,000 rupees and oversaw the reconstruction of the fort and the stepwell known as Govind Kund.

He served as president of Akhil Bharatiya Kshatriya Mahasabha in 1911.

=== Delhi Durbars ===
==== Durbar of 1903 ====
He was invited to attend the Delhi Durbar on 1 January 1903 but did not attend due to state obligations.

==== Durbar of 1911 ====
When the Delhi Durbar of 1911 was scheduled, the Governor-General of India sent him a Kharita invitation. He attended it along with his sons. On the occasion, his sons, Mandhata Singh and Ramchandra Singh, served as pages to the Queen-Empress Mary. Both received diamond badges from Mary.

== Death ==
He died on 13 July 1919 and was succeeded by Dileep Singh as the Raja of Sailana.

== Honours ==
He received the Kaisar-i-Hind gold medal in 1901. In June 1904, he was appointed a Knight Commander of the Order of the Indian Empire and was formally invested with the honor by George V, then Prince of Wales, in November 1905 at Indore. In 1904, he was awarded the title of Bahadur. In 1904, George Curzon arranged a conference to discuss the reorganization of Mayo College in Ajmer of which he was selected a representative. He was later appointed a permanent member of the General Council of Mayo College. He was appointed a permanent member of the Daly College Council.
