= Bijai Singh =

Maharawal of Dungarpur from 1844 to 1898

- Maharawal

Maharawal of Dungarpur
- Reign: 1898 – 1918
- Coronation: 1898
- Investiture: 27 February 1909
- Predecessor: Udai Singh II
- Successor: Laxman Singh
- Born: 17 July 1887
- Died: 15 November 1918 (aged 31)
- Spouse: Devendra Kanwar
- Issue: Laxman Singh; Virbhadra Singh; Nagendra Singh; Pradyuman Singh; Rama Kumari
- House: Dungarpur
- Dynasty: Sisodia
- Father: Khuman Singh

Sir Bijai Singh KCIE (also spelled as Bijay Singh or Vijay Singh) was the Maharawal of Dungarpur from 1898 to 1918.

== Early life ==
Singh was born on 17 July 1887 to Khuman Singh. While he was five years old, he lost his father, Khuman Singh, and became the heir to the throne of his grandfather, Udai Singh. Shortly afterward, he also lost his mother.

== Education ==
He was educated at Mayo College, Ajmer, where he received the college diploma in 1906. He then entered the Imperial Cadet Corps for a brief period of time and later returned to Mayo College to join the post-diploma course. He left the college in 1907.

== Reign ==
He succeeded his grandfather, Udai Singh II, as Maharawal of Dungarpur in February 1898. As he was a minor at the time of his succession, the state was placed under direct management, and its administration was carried out by a political agent, assisted by a chief executive officer and a council of two consultative members. He was formally invested with full ruling powers by Colonel F. H. Pinhey, the Agent in Rajputana to the Governor-General of India, on 27 February 1909. He had demarcated the Dungarpur's 450 miles of reserved jungles and instituted a regular forest law. He established regular courts of law and constituted the Legislative and Executive Councils in his state. He reorganized the police, customs, and forest departments, modernized the excise department, and introduced the Madras system in his state. During his reign, World War I broke out, and he contributed men and money to the British Government for the war effort. He offered a contingent of 100 men for garrison duty in India and personally accompanied the first installment on 6 May 1918 to Nowgong and returned to Dungarpur on 11 May 1918.

He attended the Delhi Durbar in 1903 and 1911.

== Personal life ==
He married Devendra Kanwar, the daughter of the Raja of Sailana, on 19 January 1907. They had four sons: Laxman Singh, Virbhadra Singh, Nagendra Singh, and Pradyuman Singh, as well as one daughter, Rama Kumari.

== Death ==
He contracted influenza during the 1918–1920 flu pandemic, which later developed into double pneumonia, leading to his death. He died on 15 November 1918 and was succeeded by his son, Laxman Singh, as Maharawal of Dungarpur. He had written a will at the time of his death, stating that the administration of the Dungarpur would be carried out under the guidance of the political agent and a council. During Laxman Singh's minority, which lasted for a decade, Bijai's wife, Devendra Kanwar, played a key role in serving the state's interests, and the political agents frequently sought her advice.

== Honours ==
He was appointed Knight Commander of the Order of the Indian Empire by George V in the 1912 Birthday Honours list.

Country	Year	Honour	Class	Ribbon	Post-nominal letters
British Raj	1903	Delhi Durbar Medal (1903)	Gold		
British Raj	1911	Delhi Durbar Medal (1911)	Gold		
United Kingdom	1912	Order of the Indian Empire	Knight Commander		KCIE
