= Ratlam State =

Princely State Of India

Coordinates: 23.32°N 75.07°E

Ratlam State रतलाम रियासत
- Princely State
- 1652–1948
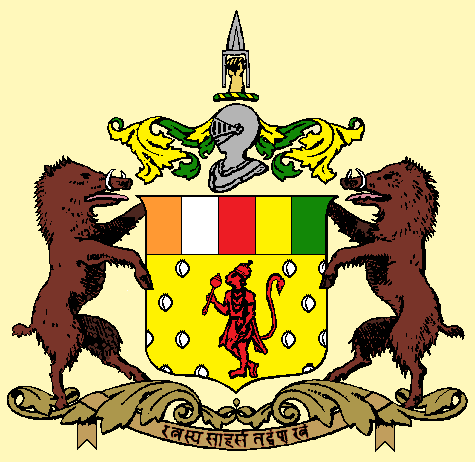
- Flag Coat of arms

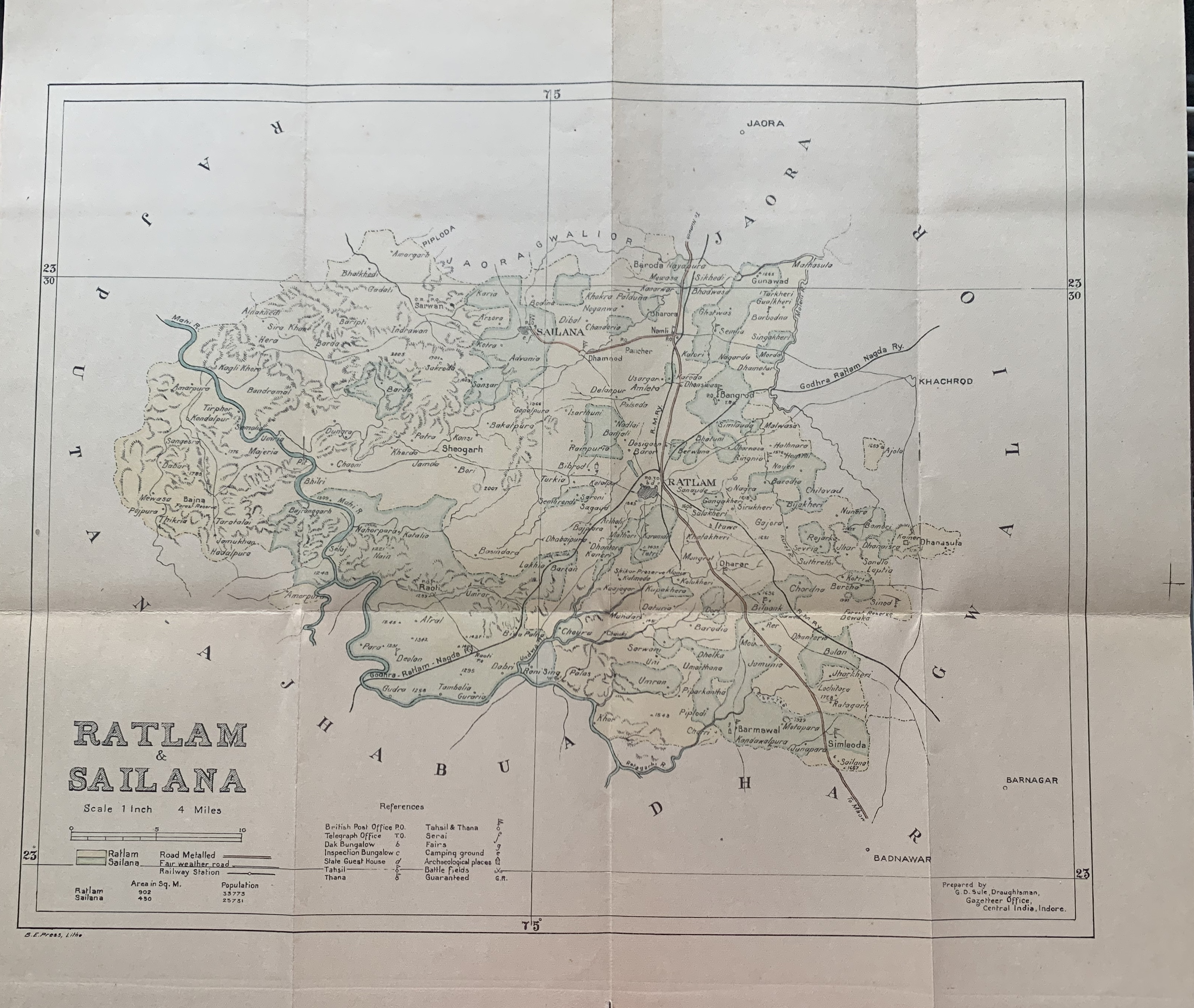
- A map showing the division of Ratlam (yellow) and Sailana (green).
- Capital: Ratlam
- Area
  - 1901: 2,336 km^{2} (902 sq mi)
- Government
  - Motto: Ratanasya Sahasam Tadvansh Ratnam; "Ratan's valour is the glory of his race"
- History
  - Established: 1652
  - Independence of India: 1948
Succeeded by
India
- Today part of: Madhya Pradesh, India

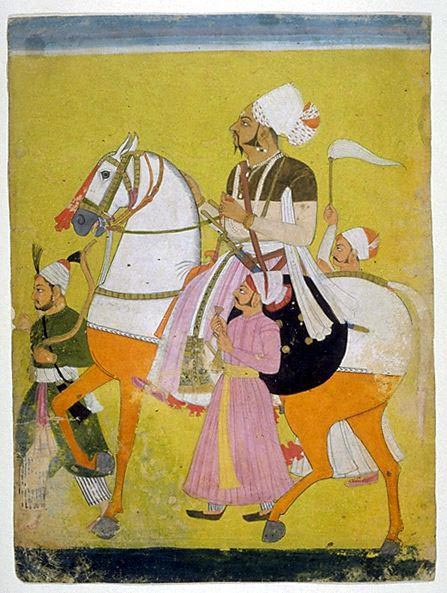
Painting of Padam Singh, the Raja of Ratlam (1773–1800)

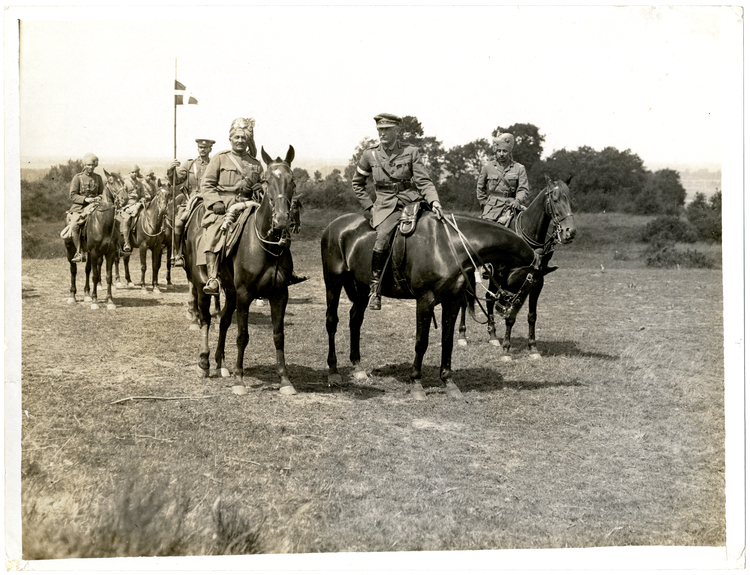
Sajjan Singh, the Maharaja of Ratlam, riding with Lt. Gen. Rimington and Sir Partab Singh. Linghem, France, 28 July 1915

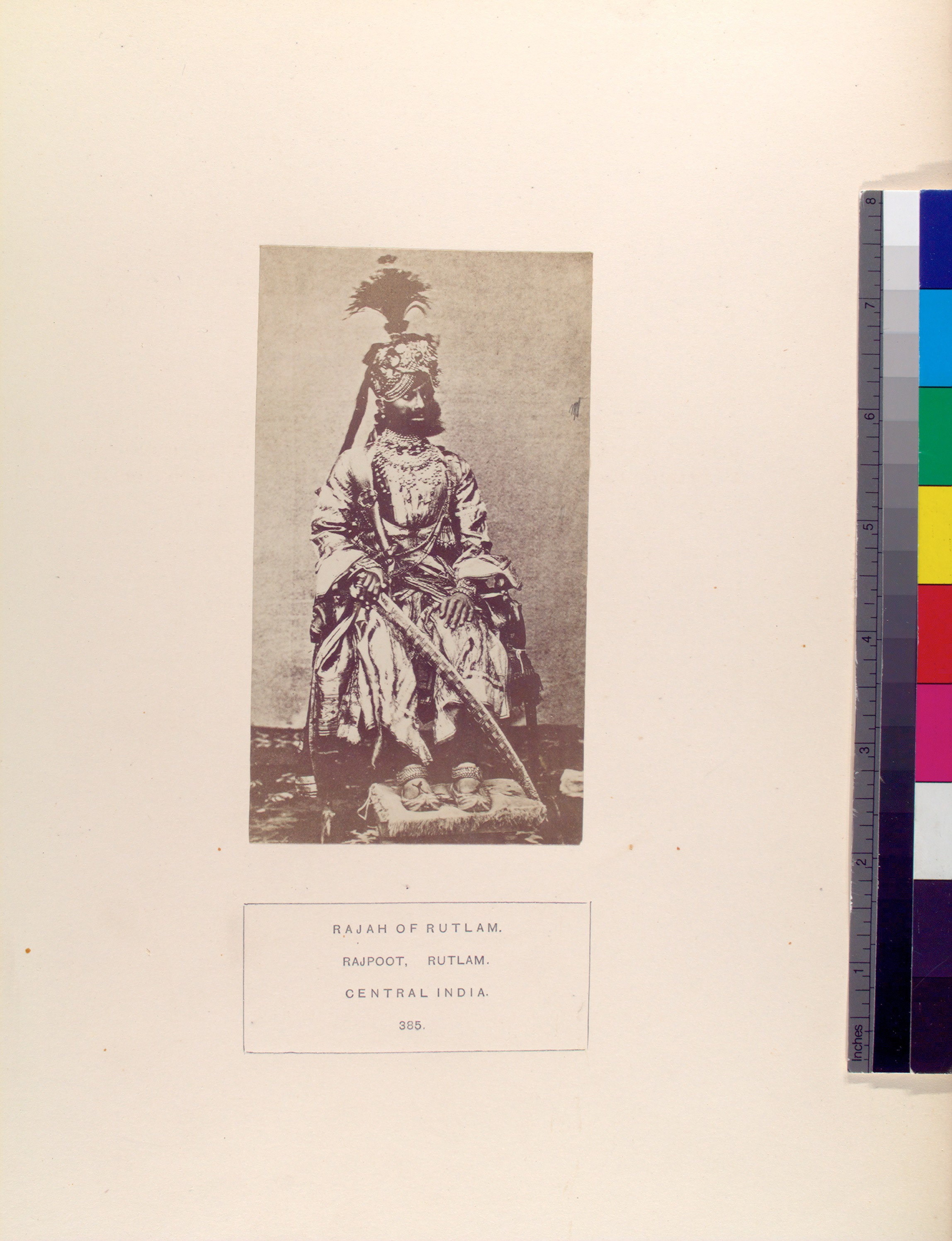
Raja Bhairon Singh (b.1839–d.1864)

Ratlam State was a 13 gun salute (15 local) princely state in India, part of the Malwa Agency of Central India during the British Raj.

The state's capital was Ratlam town in modern Ratlam district of Madhya Pradesh. Ratlam State was originally a prosperous kingdom, its parganas included Dharad (Ratlam), Raoti, Dhamnod, Badnawar, Dagparawa, Alot, Titrod, Kotri, Gadgucha, Agar, Nahargarh, Kanar, Bhilara and Ramgharia yielding a revenue of Rs.53,00,000 in the 17th century. Maharaja Ratan Singh Rathore of Ratlam supported Dara Shukoh during the Mughal succession war. However Dara Shukoh lost and Ratan Singh was killed in battle. The new emperor Aurangzeb annexed Ratlam and reduced the state to a great extent. The state further lost land to the Scindias of Gwalior. During British rule in 1901 the state had an area of 1795 km^{2} and an estimated revenue of Rs.10,00,000.

== History ==
=== Early history ===
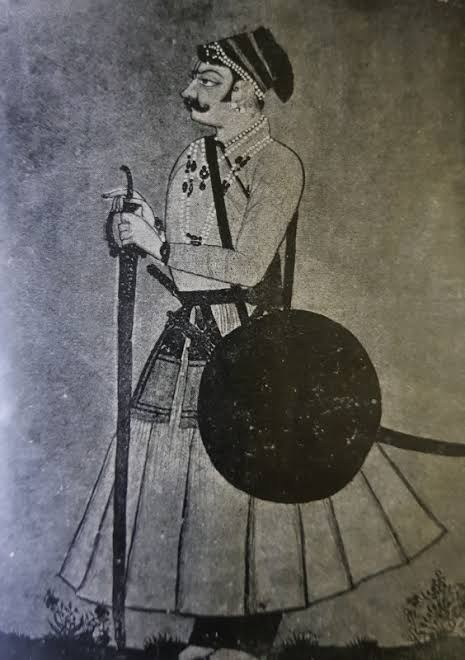
Painting of Maharaja Ratan Singh, the ancestor of the Rajas of Ratlam, Sailana and Sitamau.

The rulers of Ratlam were originally princes and Jagirdars (nobles) of Marwar. Dalpat Singh, who was the 4th son of Raja Udai Singh of Marwar was given the jagirs of Balaheda, Pisangan and Kherwa. Dalpat Singhs son Maheshdas Rathore was given the jagir of Jalore by the Mughal emperor Shah Jahan for his successful campaign against the Pashtun tribes of Afghanistan. Maheshdas Rathore's son Ratan Singh continued his father's legacy as a Mughal general in Afghanistan. He repelled Central Asian marauders and campaigned against the Persian Safavids with the Mughal prince Dara Shukoh.

Shah Jahan made Ratan Singh the Maharaja of Dharad for his bravery shown against the Persians at Khorasan and the Uzbeks at Kandahar. Ratan Singh had also shown his bravery by controlling the emperors favourite elephant. The imperial elephant had trampled several civilians in Agra and none could stop its rampage, but Ratan Singh quickly climbed the elephant and controlled it by using his katar dagger. Shah Jahan was so impressed by the heroics shown by Ratan Singh, that he gave him the parganas of Dharad, Raoti, Dhamnod, Badnawar, Dagparawa, Alot, Titrod, Kotri, Gadgucha, Agar, Nahargarh, Kanar, Bhilara and Ramgharia. Maharaja Ratan Singh thus founded the kingdom of Dharad in 1652 (predecessor to the State of Ratlam). Ratan singh was given the titles of Maharajadhiraj, shree Huzur and Maharaja Bahadur by Shah Jahan. He was further decorated with the insignias of chaur (yak's tail), morchal (peacock plumes), suraj mukhi (fans with a representation of the sun and moon) and mahi-maratib (insignia of the fish). Ratan Singh was killed in battle while fighting the son of Shah Jahan, Aurangzeb, during the succession civil war, in Dharmatpur, his wife Maharani Sukhroopde Kanwar Shekhawat Ji Sahiba committed sati in 1658.

=== Division of Ratlam ===
After Ratan Singhs death, Aurangzeb degraded Ratlam to a zamindari but his descendants were allowed to rule the area. In 1695 Aurangzeb annexed Ratlam due to "imperial displeasure". Keshodas who was the second grandson of Ratan Singh had his men kill the Jaziya collectors due to which all land holdings of Ratlam were confiscated by the Mughals and transferred to Muhammad Azam Shah. Keshodas was punished and degraded in rank. The Rathore dynasty of Ratlam suffered during this time period and their fortune declined rapidly. However Keshodas joined Mughal service and was able to recover some of his holdings through which he became the raja of Sitamau State, Ratlam itself remained under Mughal control. Another son of Ratan Singh called Chattrasal was also active as a Mughal general and was able to lead a successful career, however during a siege his eldest son Hathe Singh was killed by the shot of European artillery. The Mughal emperor restored Ratlam to Chattrasal in 1705 for his sons sacrifice. Chattrasal soon died and divided his state into three parts which was held by his two sons and one grandson, each successor was given equal ranks and Privileges. This division caused a lot of infighting, Chattrasals second son Keshri Singh took Ratlam and displaced his nephew Berisal (son of first son Hathe Singh), in turn the third son Pratap Singh killed Keshri Singh and took over all three divisions. During this time Keshri Singhs elder son Man Singh was at Delhi while his younger son Jai Singh was at Ratlam. Jai Singh successfully escaped and started preparing an army, he rallied his relatives from Narwar and Lalgarh and soon prepared an army to attack Ratlam. Pratap Singh was defeated by Jai Singh at Sagod and was killed in the action that followed. Jai Singh soon entered Ratlam and captured it, his brother Man Singh was at Amber during this time and tried to get help from its ruler but it was not needed any longer. Jai Singh met his brother and they both returned to Ratlam. Man Singh succeeded as the next ruler of Ratlam while Jai Singh took over Pratap Singhs lands and became the first ruler of Sailana State.

=== British Era ===
During Parbat Singhs reign Ratlam was harassed by Gwalior state, but on 5 January 1819 it became a British protectorate, following which an arrangement was made by which the Sindhia engaged never to send any troops into the country or to interfere with the internal administration in return for a yearly tribute. The tribute treaty did not last for long as Daulat Rao Scindia soon relinquished his rights of tribute on Ratlam and Sailana, the tribute was thus paid directly to the British instead.

During British rule, the State had an area of 1795 km^{2}, which was closely interlaced with the territory of the princely State of Sailana. In 1901, the state had a population of 83,773; the town of Ratlam had a population of 36,321. The state enjoyed an estimated revenue of rs.8,00,000. The town was a junction on the Rajputana-Malwa Railway, and was an important trade centre, especially of opium.

The state's last ruler signed the instrument of accession to the Indian Union on 15 June 1948.

== Rulers ==
The rulers were Ratanawat Rathore Rajputs and were closely related to the ruling families of Sailana, Sitamau, Kachhi Baroda and Multhan.

=== Maharajas ===
Date of Reign	Maharajas of Ratlam	Note
1648–1658	Ratan Singh (d.1658)	Courageous in youth, he gained emperor Shah Jahan's notice by slaying the Emperor's favourite elephant which had run amok in the Agra Palace Garden, fought for the Emperor against the Persians in Kabul and Kandahar, later in 1652, the Emperor substituted Jalore for the pargana of Ratlam and many other areas, and he became the first Raja of Ratlam, in 1658 a false rumour of the death of the Emperor resulted in a frenzied scramble for succession to the throne amongst his sons. Dara Shikoh who was officiating for his father, sent a combined army of Rajputs and Muslims under the command of Maharaja Jaswant Singh of Jodhpur, against his brother Aurangzeb. The Maharaja, as head of the Rathore clan, was persuaded to hand over command of the Imperial army to Maharaja Ratan Singh. Non-cooperation by the Muslim commanders resulted in the army sustaining heavy losses in the fierce battle at Dharmat, as well as the death of Ratan Singh (said to have sustained 80 sword wounds on his body), he married (amongst others), Maharani Sukhroopde Kanwar Shekhawat Ji Sahiba, daughter of Kunwar Purshottam Das of Jhajhar [Shekhawati], and had issue. He died in 1658 Battle of Dharmat near Ujjain.

=== Rajas ===
Pictures	Date of Reign	Rajas of Ratlam	Note
	1658–1682	Ram Singh	He ruled for 24 years and was killed in battle.
	1682–1701	Keshodas	His soldiers killed a Mughal tax collector due to which he was banished from his kingdom by Aurangzeb. He was later compensated with Titrod (Sitamau State).
	1705–1709	Chhatrasal (d. 1712)	He was a younger son of Maharaja Ratan Singh. He held the Mughal rank of 1500 Zat and 1500 Sawar. A great Imperial commander who served in the wars against the sultanates of Bijapur and Golconda, at the sieges of Rajgarh, Jinji and Panhala. He was restored to the Ratlam throne by emperor Aurangzeb because of his bravery shown in the siege of Panhala, he received 30 sword wounds and his eldest son was also killed. Ratlam was reduced to three Paraganas (Ratlam, Raoti and Dhamnod) by the Mughal emperor and Chhatrasal further divided the kingdom by giving equal shares to all of his sons. Chhatrasal lost interest in earthly pleasures because of the shock he received from his sons death, he left Ratlam and lived his remaining years in Ujjain.
	1709 – Feb 1716	Keshri Singh	He was killed by his younger brother Pratap Singh of Raoti and his throne was usurped by him. Keshri Singhs elder son Man Singh was in Delhi and his younger son Jai Singh escaped and started preparing an army against Pratap Singh.
	Feb 1716–1716	Pratap Singh	He was killed by his nephew Jai Singh in the battle of Sagode. Jai Singh remained loyal to his brother and secured Ratlam until his return.
	1716–1743	Man Singh	He divided his state with his younger brother Jai Singh, who became the first raja of Sailana State.
	1743–1773	Prithvi Singh	
	1773–1800	Padam Singh	
	1800–1825	Parbat Singh	During his rule Ratlam was invaded by the Scindia's of Gwalior. He concluded treaties with both the Scindia's and the British to protect his kingdom. A tribute was promised to Gwalior and in return Scindia promised to not interfere in Ratlam affairs.
	1825–29 Aug 1857	Balwant Singh	
	1825–c.1832	Borthwick	Regent
	29 August 1857 – 27 January 1864	Bhairon Singh	
HH_Maharaja_Ranjeet_Singh_Of_Ratlam	27 January 1864 – 20 January 1893	Ranjit Singh	
	27 January 1893 – 15 December 1898	Regency	Regency until Sajjan Singh came of age.
	20 January 1893 – 1 January 1921	Sajjan Singh	During his rule Ratlams gun salutes were increased to 13 guns and 15 local. His title was also increased from raja bahadur to maharaja bahadur for his services in the Anglo-Afghan war.

=== Maharajas ===
Date of Reign	Maharajas of Ratlam
1 January 1893 – 3 February 1947	Sajjan Singh (s.a.)
3 February 1947 – 15 August 1947	Lokendra Singh (b. 1927 – d. 1991)

== Jagirdars ==
The jagirdars of the state were styled as Thakur, or, if they were descendants of a former ruler, as Maharaj. They held their jagirs from the State on service tenure. They were required to assist their ruler by providing a designated quota of armed men and performing other specified services. They all paid tribute, called tanka, to the ruler. There were 30 in total, divided into several classes.

The following were the First Class Jagirdars of Ratlam.

Name	Revenue(Rs.)	Dynasty
Pancher	48,000	Chauhan
Namli	33,500	Chauhan
Amleta	27,600	Rathore
Sarwan	26,400	Rathore
Shivgarh	15,800	Rathore

== See also ==
- List of Rajput dynasties and states
- Malwa Agency
