= Ratan Singh Rathore =

Maharaja of Ratlam from 1648 to 1658

Raja Ratan Singh
- Maharajadhiraj Shree Huzur Bahadur
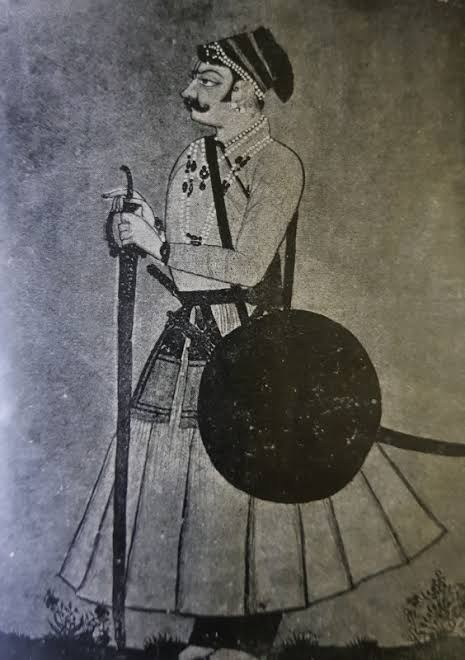
- Depiction of Ratan Singh Rathore

Maharaja of Ratlam
- Reign: 1648–1658
- Predecessor: Rao Mahesh Das
- Successor: Raja Ram Singh
- Born: 6 March 1619; Jalore, Pali, Marwar, Rajputana
- Died: 15 April 1658; Fatehabad, near Ujjain, Malwa, Mughal Empire
- Spouses: Chauhanji Harroop Deiji of Bedla in Mewar; Shekhawatji Sukhroop Deiji of Khandela in Amber; Sisodiniji Manohar Deiji of Pratapgarh; Rajawatji Atiroop Deiji of Dhula in the Kingdom of Amber; Rajawatji Gunroop Deiji of Bhangarh in Amber; Devadiji Ratan Deiji of Sirohi
- Issue: Sons: List; Ram Singh; Rai Singh; Nahar Singh; Karan Singh; Chatrasal; Akhairaj; Prithviraj; Jait Singh; Kishan Singh; Soor Singh; Dhirat Singh; Sagat Singh; Daughters: List; Pratap Kanwarji (married Maharawal Amar Singh of Jaisalmer); Kushal Kanwarji (married Maharawal Ajab of Banswara); Maha Kanwarji (married Raja Daulat Singh of Shahpura)
- Father: Rao Mahesh Das
- Mother: Kachwahiji (Rajawatji) Kusum Deiji d.of Raja Bhagwant Das of Amber

Raja Ratan Singh (6 March 1619 – 15 April 1658) was the founder of the city of Ratlam and its eponymous Ratlam State, an imperial governor of 16 parganas in northern Malwa Subah, an important Mughal Subahdar of high rank and a renowned warrior of his time. He gained fame under the patronage of the Mughal Emperor Shah Jahan.

== Family ==
Raja Ratan Singh was born on 6 March 1619 as the eldest son of Rao Mahesh Das in Jalore Fort under the territory of his paternal home Marwar and his wife Kachwahiji (Rajawatji) Kusum Deiji, a granddaughter of Mirza Raja Man Singh I of Amber through his son Jhujhar Singh. His paternal grandfather, Kunwar Dalpat Singh was the son of Mota Raja Udai Singh of Marwar.

Two of his paternal aunts were married to Rao Chattarsal of Bundi who became the mother of his successor Rao Bhao Singh and his uncle Hari Singh younger brother of Rao Chattarsal and Rao Madho Singh founder of Kota, i.e. sons of Rao Raja Ratan Singh of Bundi.

== Accession and career ==
At a young age of twenty-three, Ratan Singh, armed with nothing but a dagger fought and controlled a mad elephant in Delhi and impressed its Emperor. Ratan Singh was recruited as an imperial general by Shah Jahan and was posted in Afghanistan as a mansabdar. He continued to gain fame by defeating wild bands of central Asian invaders and by later campaigning against the Persians under the Mughal prince Dara Shukoh. In 1648 he was given a Mughal rank of 3000 horsemen, the standard of Mahi Maratib and a Jagir of Malwa, where he made Ratlam his capital. Ratan Singh was soon informed about Aurangzeb and Murad's betrayal and he immediately came to the aid of Shah Jahan to stop the Mughal princes. Ratan Singh fought the rebel army at Dharmatpur on 15 April 1658, most sources say that the Mughal generals deputed by Shah Jahan either fled or remained inactive throughout the battle. Ratan Singh thus took command of the remaining army and fought till his death.

== Recognition ==
According to Karuna Joshi - "The Battle of Dharmat did not end after Jaswant Singh's flight from the war, but it was finished after the death of Ratan Singh." "Though Jaswant Singh fought bravely and got wounded, his escape from the battlefield was considered to be derogatory according to the custom of Rajasthan. So he obtained no place in the heroic poetry of Rajasthan. But Ratan singh's bravery, courage and sacrifice brought him name and fame which was amply described in the poems of contemporary poets like Khadia Jaga and Kumbhakaran Sada."

James Tod has written - "Of all the deeds of heroism performed on this day, those of Ratan of Ratlam by universal consent are pre-eminent and are wreathed into immortal rhyme by the bard in the Rasa Rao Ratna."

Banhe Raso, Ratan Raso and Vachanika Rathore Ratan Maheshdasot Ri are some works of Rajasthani literature that have written about Ratan Singhs life.

== Successors ==
His successors founded the states of Ratlam, Sailana, Sitamau.
