= Suryamal Misran =

Indian writer & historian from Bundi

Kaviraj Mahakavi Suryamal Misran
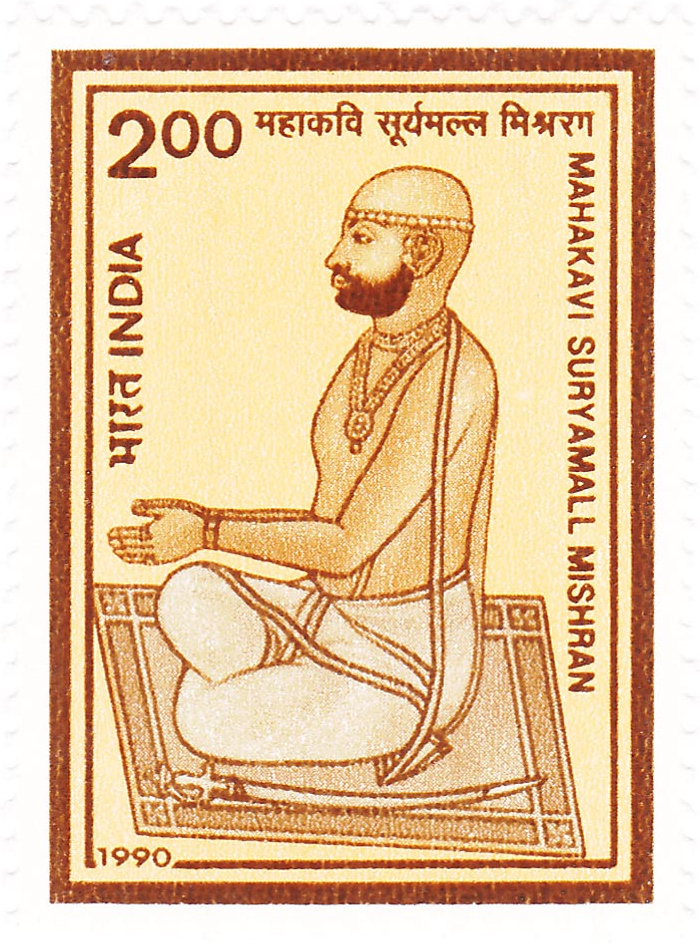
- Commemorative stamp of Suryamall Mishran (1815-1868)
- Born: 19 October 1815; Harna, Bundi State
- Died: 11 October 1868 (aged 52); Bundi
- Occupations: Poet; Historian
- Children: 1 Murari Dan Misran (Rajkavi of Bundi)
- Writing career
- Language: Dingal; Sanskrit; Rajasthani; Prakrit; Hindi; Apabhraṃśa
- Notable works: Vansha Bhaskar Veer Satsai Sati Raso

Kaviraja Suryamall Misran (also spelled Suryamall Meesan; 1815–1868) was the Rajkavi (poet-historian) of Bundi kingdom. He was proficient in six languages including Dingal, Sanskrit, Prakrit, Apabhraṃśa, and was a scholar of grammar, logic, history and politics. His important works include Vansh Bhaskar, Vir Satsai, Balwant Vilas and Chhandomayukh.

== Biography ==
=== Early life and family ===
The great poet-historian of Rajasthan, Suryamall Misran was born in Harna village of Bundi district on 19 October 1815 AD (VS 1872). His father's name was Kaviraja Chandidan and his mother's name was Bhawani Bai. Suryamall Mishran's lineage can be traced back to poet Chandkoti, who was renowned for his mastery of six languages. He and his successors, including Bhan, who settled in Bundi, were all great poets. Among them, Kavi Badanji gained fame for his poetry in Pingal (Brij-Bhasha).

The family originally resided in the kingdom of Mewar. Bhan, an esteemed ancestor of Suryamall, held a respected position in the Chittorgarh darbar and would occasionally visit Rao Suryamal, the reigning ruler of Bundi. During one such visit, Rao bestowed great honor upon Bhan as his guest, and while on during a hunting expedition, Bhan and Rao Suryamal encountered two large bears, which Rao Suryamal skillfully dispatched with his katar. Impressed, Bhan immortalized the event in his poetry, evoking the appreciation of Rao Suryamal, who gifted him an elephant, a horse, and a substantial amount. Rao Suryamal persuaded Bhan to stay as his guest for several months. However, upon returning to Chittorgarh, Bhan narrated the tale of Suryamal's valor and generosity to Rana Ratan Singh, who, out of jealousy, asked him to leave his domain. Bhan then returned to Bundi, where he was warmly received and honored with a jagir in sasan and valuable presents. Later, Bhan's descendants made Bundi their permanent residence. Kaviraja Chandidan, the father of poet Suryamall Misran, was the tenth successor in line from Bhan.

Kaviraja Chandidan was a prolific scholar and poet of his time, skilled in Pingala, Dingala and Sanskrit. Vishnu Singh, the then Maharaja of Bundi, had conferred the fiefdom of a village in sasan, lakh pasav, and the title of Kaviraja to Chandi Dan. Chandi Dan composed three texts of utmost importance, namely Balavigraha, Saar Sagar, and Vanshabharan.

=== Education ===
Suryamal was endowed with sharp acumen and extraordinary memory since childhood. He acquired deep knowledge of many disciplines in his childhood. Having been educated by the leading scholars of his age, Suryamal Misran was well-versed in astronomy, religion, culture, astrology, philosophy, and several languages, in addition to possessing exceptional literary gifts. His deep inclination towards music is reflected by the fact that he usually carried a Veena with him.

"The boars lay waste the greenery, the elephants muddle the lake, While the lion is lost in his lioness' love oblivious of the stake
Don't be called now Simhas (lions), O Thakurs, while alien mercy you seek
Only those whose paws fell the elephants, are worth the name, not the meek."

— Suryamall Mishran

He received education in Dingala, Sanskrit, philosophy, history, and poetics from various Gurus besides his own father. Swami Swarupdas, a Dadupanthi, gave him training in Yoga, Vedanta, Nyaya, and Vaiseshika literature. From Pandit Ashanand, he learned grammar, verses, poetry, astrology, Ashvadhak, and Chanakya Shastra. From Muhammad, he learned veena-playing and Persian from another mentor. From another Muslim teacher, he acquired knowledge about Islamic religion and culture and had read Persian histories like the Tarikh-i-Firishta and the Akbar-Nama by Abul-Fazl. Thus, Suryamal Misran received an educational, literary, and historical atmosphere right from the beginning, giving rise to a unique confluence of knowledge, wisdom, and valor. In his book Vansh-Bhaskar, Suryamall expresses his deep respect for these Gurus. For one of his guru, a Muslim scholar named Mohammad, Suryamall writes:

My Guru and Teacher Mohammad is an embodiment of virtue and is a staunch worshipper of Allah. It is from him that I have learnt the secrets of his religion. — Vansh-Bhaskar

== Career ==
Suryamall succeeded his father in the court in the office of Kaviraja in the reign of Maharao Raja Ram Singh. He wrote primarily in Dingal, though he also made occasional use of Sanskrit, Prakrit, Magadhi, Pingal and other dialects.

Misran was a court poet (Raj-Kavi) of the Bundi kingdom, which was ruled by Hada Chauhans. In the poetry world, they are known as "Mahakavi". He undertook the work Vans Bhaskar during the reign of Maharao Ram Singh. He intended to write Vans Bhaskar in two volumes and twelve parts as an analogy with the sun, which has two solstices and twelve months in a year. He left the work unfinished at the eighth part of the second volume because of differences with the king, whose territory became a British protectorate, while the poet supported the Indian Rebellion of 1857.

Suryamal Misran felt moved by the plight of ordinary Rajput soldiers. In at least three couplets of Veer Satsai he expressed his concern for the wives of soldiers, who asked the queen for a handful of grains against the promise of their husbands' heads rolling before hers, whenever needed in return. Veer-Satsai is an expression of the hopes and aspirations of the Rajasthani Warriors and their spouses. It describes those who engaged in defiance and death, preferring extinction with honour to a life of slavery and shame.

Misran's glorification of local heroes helped to develop the spirit of nationalization in Rajasthan.

== Anti-British Sentiment ==
Suryamal Misran was a proponent of resistance against colonial powers. In his views, subjection to the British implied loss of dharma (faith and way of life). He warned that if the British stayed on no one would be jami ka thakur (lord of the land) and all would become Isai (Christian).

Suryamal wrote to most Kings and Thakurs of Rajputana to stand up against the British. He envisioned a coalition of the Hindu kings of India who would wage war and drive out the British once and for all.

During the 1857 war against the British, Suryamal celebrated the courage of the Auwa Thakur Kushal Singh who had given shelter to the Purabia soldiers of the Jodhpur Legion which had rebelled against the British East India Company and were marching from Sirohi towards British India.

== Death ==
Although Suryamal had no dearth of wealth and resources he spent his days depressed because he had no children, he felt suffocated by the growing hold of British power over India. The last days of his life were spent in a crisis. He found shelter in music and alcohol, he was immersed in alcohol by night, and alcohol made him diseased, gradually his body became thin and he succumbed to death. In this way, he died in Bundi on 11 October 1868(VS 1925 Ashadh Krishna Ekadashi). His death was mourned by the people and nobles of Rajasthan and Malwa, many poems were written as a tribute to him.

== Legacy ==
Throughout his life, Suryamal Misran married six times. His first wedding was attended by Maharao Ram Singh, the King of Bundi himself.

He was counted among the five gems (panch-ratna) of Bundi. His epic creation "Vansh Bhaskar" book also remained incomplete, which was later completed by his adopted son Kaviraja Murari Dan.

Suryamal Misran is often referred to by Indian scholars as the ‘Veda Vyas’ of the recent modern period, in that his Vansha Bhaskar is regarded as an epic on par with Mahabharata.

== Works ==
=== Vansha Bhaskar ===
Suryamall's monumental work, Vansh-Bhaskar, is a vast source of knowledge on war, astronomy, yoga, religion, and ancient traditional sciences of India, while extensively covering the history of the Chauhans and other dynasties of Rajasthan.

In the 19th century, publication of Vansh Bhaskar proved to be disruptive for bardic poetry in Bundi.

Its publication has very nearly killed Bardic activity at Bundi, because every poet I met with recited verses from the Vamsabhaskar. I enquired about old families of bards, but I was told that during the last 70 years their libraries have been dissipated. In fact, I was shown a huge mass of loose pages of a collection of Bardic songs purchased from a Bania for two pice.

Works of Suryamal Misran remained influential even after a century. Gyasiram Misra (from Mathura) who was given the same position in Bundi Court based his work Vamsa Pradipaka on Suryamall’s Vansh Bhaskar.

Prominent compositions by Suryamal Misran are:

1. Vansh Bhaskar
2. Veer Satsai
3. Dhatu Roopawali
4. Balwad Vilas (Balwant Vilas)
5. Ram Ranjat
6. Chhand Mayukh
7. Sati Raso
8. Sati Sujas

== Suryamal Mishran Shikhar award ==
Suryamal Mishran Shikhar Award, in the memory of the 19th century poet-historian Suryamal Misran, is given on the basis of the commendation of the committee constituted by Rajasthani Bhasha Sahitya and Sanskriti Akademi, Bikaner (Government of Rajasthan) for special contribution to Rajasthani literature.

== In popular culture ==
In recent years, his persona has been staged in theatre, most notably in Rajendra Panchal's 'Katha Sukavi Suryamall Ki' performed by the Perafin group of Kota.
