= Dileep Singh =

H.H. Raja Sir Dileep Singh K.C.I.E. (18 March 1891 - 8 February 1961) was the last official ruler of the princely state of Sailana from 1919 to 1948.

Raja Sir Dileep Singh was educated at the Mayo college Ajmer and completed his diploma and post diploma in the B.A. standard in 1912. He was further trained in Judicial and revenue works by Mr. A.T. Holve C.I.E, commissioner of Ajmer. He succeeded to the throne upon the death of his father Raja Sir Jashwant Singh II in 1919.

He received the Delhi Durbar Medal in 1911, King George V Silver Jubilee Medal in 1935 and the Indian Independence Medal in 1948.

He was created KCIE in 1934. He served as president of Akhil Bharatiya Kshatriya Mahasabha in 1920 and 1930 and was the permanent vice president thereof.

Singh was also the permanent president of the Kurukshetra Jirnodhar committee whose sole objective was the restoration of the ponds, lakes and shrines of Kurukshetra extending over 96 miles of the holy land. The Raja also constructed the Krishna temple at Thanesar.

He was also a food connoisseurs of his time and built a collection of 5000 recipe.

He signed the instrument of accession to the Dominion of India on 15 June 1948, merging the Sailana State in to the Union of India.

He died on 8 February 1961. He was succeeded by his son Digvijay Singh as the titular Raja of Sailana.
