= Nagendra Singh =

Indian lawyer and administrator

Judge (Dr.) Nagendra Singh
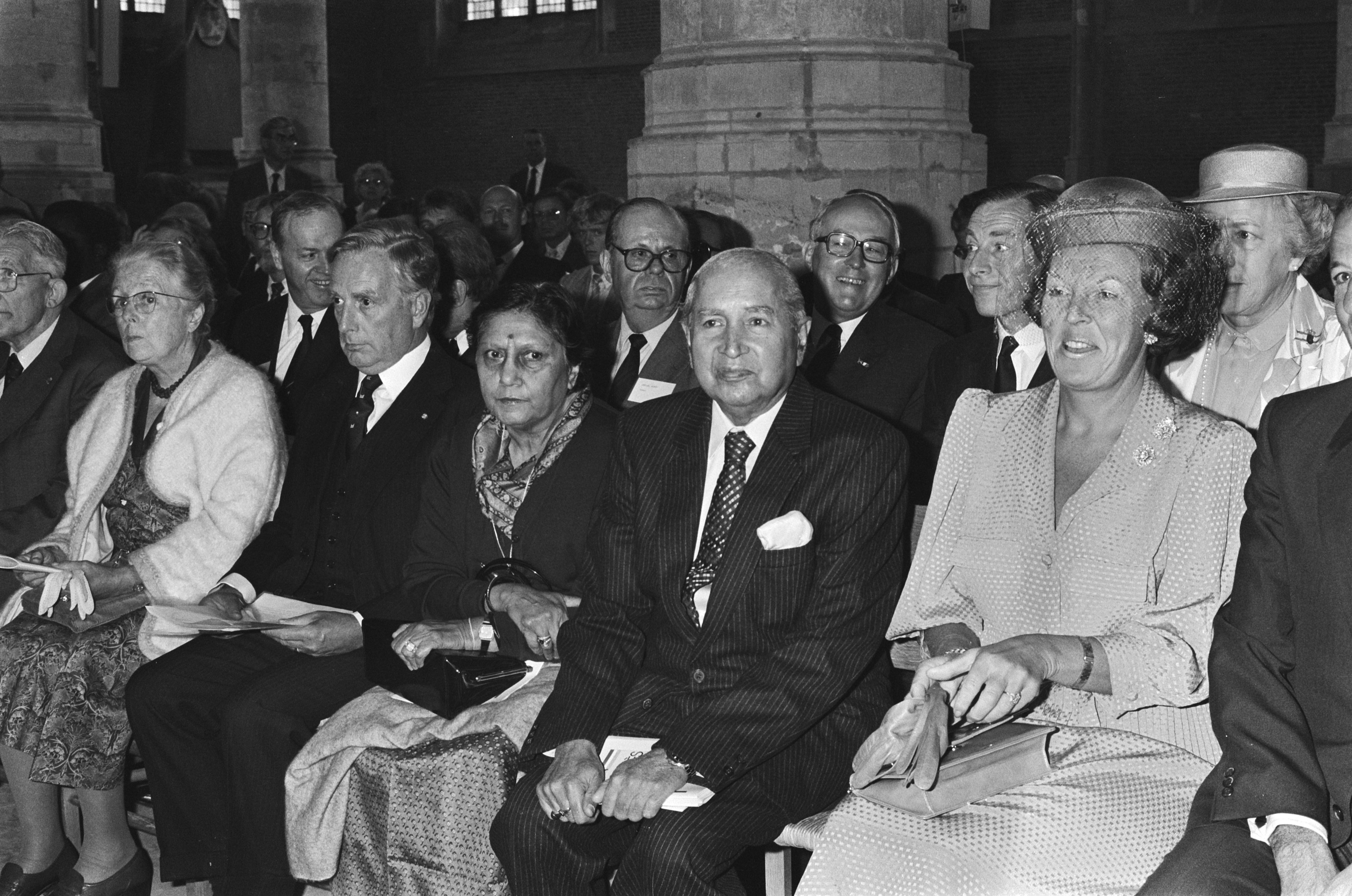
- Nagendra Singh with Queen Beatrix at the Congress of the International Association of Lawyers (UIA) in Hague, 1985.

President of the International Court of Justice
- In office 1985–1988
- Preceded by: Taslim Elias
- Succeeded by: José Ruda

4th Chief Election Commissioner of India
- In office 1 October 1972 – 6 February 1973
- Preceded by: SP Sen Verma
- Succeeded by: T. Swaminathan

Personal details
- Born: 18 March 1914 Dungarpur, Rajasthan
- Died: 11 December 1988 (aged 74) The Hague, Netherlands
- Relatives: Laxman Singh; Bijai Singh
- Education: Mayo College; St. John's College, Cambridge

Prince Sri Nagendra Singh (18 March 1914 – 11 December 1988; Hindi pronunciation: [n̪əgeːn̪d̪ɾə sɪŋgʱ]) was an Indian lawyer and administrator who served as President of the International Court of Justice from 1985 to 1988. He was the first Indian judge at the International Court of Justice and one among the four judges from India to have been judges of the International Court of Justice in The Hague, the others being B. N. Rau (1952–1953), R. S. Pathak (1989–1991) the 18th Chief Justice of India, and Dalveer Bhandari (2012–), former judge of the Supreme Court of India.

== Early life ==
Nagendra Singh was born on 18 March 1914 in the State of the Kingdom of Dungarpur, to Bijai Singh and his wife Davendra Kanwar; his elder brother was Laxman Singh I, the last monarch of Dungarpur. Before joining the Civil Service he was educated at St John's College, Cambridge.

== Career ==
He joined the Indian Civil Service and served as Regional Commissioner for the Eastern States, a member of the Constituent Assembly of India, joint secretary for India's Defense Ministry, Director-General of Transport, and special secretary in the Ministry of Information and Broadcasting.

Between 1966 and 1972 Singh was secretary to the President of India, then from 1 October 1972 to 6 February 1973 he was Chief Election Commissioner of India. In 1966, 1969, and 1975, he was appointed a representative of India in the United Nations Assembly and served on the United Nations International Law Commission on a part-time basis from 1967 to 1972. He was also elected as secretary of the International Bar Association. In 1973, he moved to The Hague to become a judge of the International Court of Justice and was its president between February 1985 and February 1988, when he retired. He continued to live at the Hague and died there in December 1988.

== Honours ==
Singh received the Padma Vibhushan from the Government of India in 1973.
