= Sitamau State =

Princely state of India

Coordinates: 20.02°N 75.35°E

- Princely State of British India
- 1701–1948
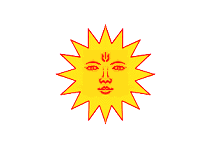
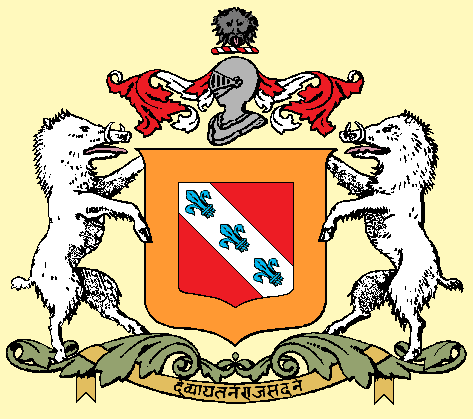
- Flag Coat of arms
- Capital: Sitamau
- Area
  - 1901: 906 km^{2} (350 sq mi)
- Population
  - 1901: 23,863
- History
  - Established: 1701
  - Accession to the Indian Union: 1948
Succeeded by
India

Sitamau State was a princely state of the British Raj before 1947. Its capital was in Sitamau town, Mandsaur district, Madhya Pradesh. The total area of the state was 350 square miles. The average revenue of the state was Rs.130,000.

== History ==
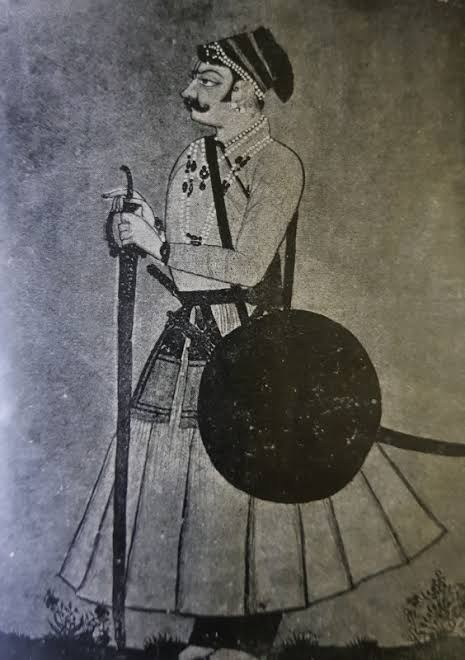
Painting of Maharaja Ratan Singh, the ancestor of the Rajas of Ratlam, Sailana and Sitamau.

Ratan Singh Rathore was killed in the battle of Dharmat against Aurangzeb, after which his descendants continued to rule Ratlam. During Raja Keshodas's reign some soldiers of the Raja killed the Jaziya tax collectors due to which the Mughals completely annexed Ratlam. Keshodas stuck to imperial service during this time and on 3 September 1699, he was made the faujdar of Nalgunda. Due to his good governance, Aurangzeb later granted Keshodas the Pargana of Titrod from which Raja Keshodas founded Sitamau State on 31 October 1701. The State of Ratlam was restored to an uncle of Keshodas called Chattrasal in 1705. In 1714 the emperor Farrukhsiyar further added the paragana of Alot to the new state. Sitamau faced invasions after the decline of the Mughal Empire. Nahargarh was captured by Gwalior State and Alot by Dewas State. This forced the rulers of Sitamau to seek the help of John Malcolm who formed a treaty between Gwalior and Sitamau, through which Sitamau paid a yearly tribute of Rs.33,000 to Gwalior and Scindia in return promised not to show hostility towards Sitamau. This tribute was later reduced to Rs.27,000.

== Rulers ==
The rulers were Ratanawat Rathor Rajputs and descendants of Ratan Singh Rathore.

=== Rajas ===
- 1701 – 1748 Raja Keshav Das son of Raja Ram Singh second ruler of Ratlam
- 1748 – 1752 Raja Gaj Singh
- 1752 – 1802 Raja Fateh Singh
- 1802 – 1867 Raja Raj Singh (d. 1867), One of the Longest-Reigning monarchs in History
- 1867 – 28 May 1885 Raja Bhawani Singh (b. 1836 – d. 1885)
- 8 Dec 1885 – 1899 Raja Bahadur Singh
- 1899 – 9 May 1900 Raja Shardul Singh
- 11 May 1900 – 15 August 1947 HH Raja Ram Singh (b. 1880 – d. 1967) (from 11 December 1911, Sir Raja Ram Singh )

Raghubir Sinh, the famous historian of Malwa and a notable student of a noted historian Sir Jadunath Sarkar was the eldest son of Raja Ram Singh who passed on the titular title of "Raja" to his son Krishan Singh who succeeded as the family head .

=== Titular Rajas ===
- 11 May 1947 – 15 August 1967 Raja Ram Singh
- 1967–2008 Raja Krishan Singh
- 2008–present Raja Puranjay Singh

== See also ==
- Malwa Agency
