= Sailana =

- Town
- The royal palaces of Sailana

- Location in Madhya Pradesh, India Sailana (India)
- Coordinates: 23.47°N 74.92°E
- Country: India
- State: Madhya Pradesh
- District: Ratlam
- Established: 1736
- Founder: Raja Jai Singh Rathore
- Elevation: 479 m (1,572 ft)

Population (2011)
  - Total: 134,959

Languages
  - Official: Malvi, Hindi
- Time zone: UTC+5:30 (IST)

Sailana is a town in the Malwa region of the Indian state of Madhya Pradesh. Sailana is 25 km (16 mi) from Ratlam city and 50 km (31 mi) away from Banswara district of the neighboring state of Rajasthan.

Sailana was once the capital of the Sailana State before it merged into India. A fort belonging to the former royal family still stands tall in Sailana. The Kedareshwar temple, situated 4 km (2.5 mi) from Sailana is a notable shrine.

== Demographics ==
As of the 2011 Census of India, Sailana had a population of 1,34,959. There are 226 villages in Sailana block. Sailana has an average literacy rate of 86%, higher than the state average of 69%: male literacy is 93%, and female literacy is 78%. In Sailana, 11% of the population is under 6 years of age. The sub-district has a high population of Scheduled tribes.

== Geography ==
Sailana is located at 23.47°N 74.92°E. It has an average elevation of 479 metres (1,571 feet).

== Foundation of Sailana ==
Raja Jai Singh wanted to shift his capital from Raoti to a safer location, he ordered the construction of his new capital close to the Kedareshwar temple and named it Jashnagar. While Jai Singh halted there with the intention of building a town, the god Kedareshwar appeared in his dream and told him that his temple was just below the hill on which Jashnagar stood, and the sewage of the new town would flow over the temple and defile it and he must therefore move east, selecting the spot on which he should kill and bury game. The god promised him that the town founded there would be healthy and prosperous. Accordingly, Raja Jai Singh rode out eastwards until he found a hare which he pierced with his spear and buried on the spot where the great Palace gate called Suraj Pole now stands. Raja Jai Singh named his new capital "Sailana" from its location at the foot of the hills (in Sanskrit, anana means mouth and shaila means hills).

== History ==
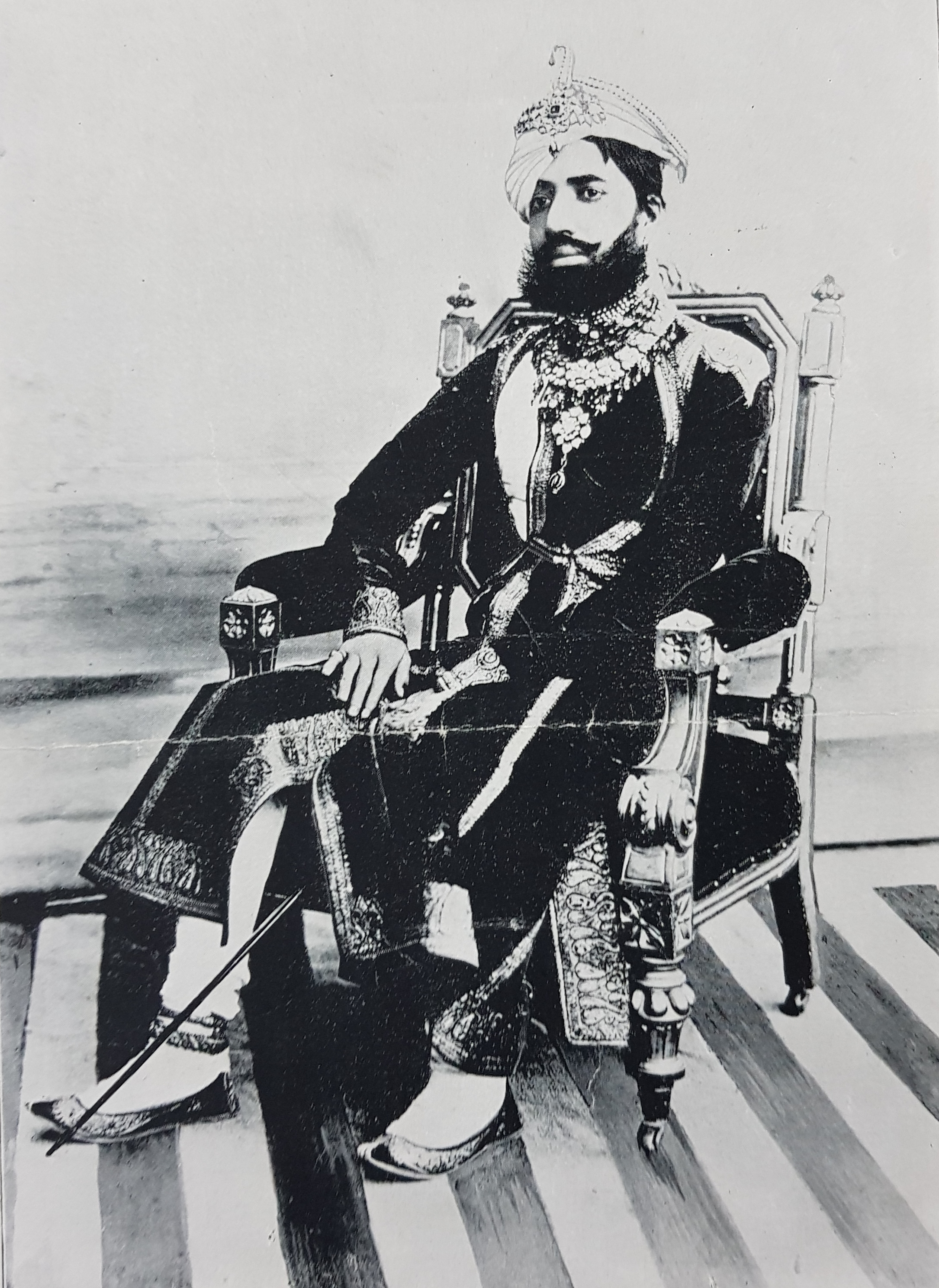
Jaswant Singh II, Raja of Sailana State (r.1895–1919)

Sailana State was founded by Raja Jai Singh Rathore (r. 1716–1757), great-grandson of Maharaja Ratan Singh Rathore. In 1716 Jai singh took revenge against his uncle for the murder of his father, he killed him in a pitched battle at sagode and secured Ratlam for his elder brother. The two brothers then divided the state between themselves. Jai singh's capital was initially at Raoti. He built Sailana town as his new capital in 1736. He fought 22 battles in his lifetime, turning Sailana into an independent state. Jai Singh was succeeded by Jaswant Singh I, Ajab Singh, Mokham Singh and Lakshman Singh. The state was able to remain independent until it was invaded by Gwalior State, the ruler Raja Lakshman Singh of Sailana initially opposed the incursions however in 1819 he approached the British for protection of his state. Sir John Malcom mediated a peace between Gwalior and Sailana and an agreement was signed according to which Gwalior promised not to interfere in the state of Sailana and Lakshman Singh promised to pay tribute to the British. Lakshman Singh was succeeded by Ratan Singh, Nahar Singh, Takhat Singh, Duleh Singh and Jaswant Singh II. Major improvements took place during Raja Jaswant Singh II's reign, which turned Sailana into a model state. Jaswant Singh II built schools, hospitals, roads, the clock arched gate, Kirti Stambh, a permanent court and organised the state police. Jaswant Singh II advocated temperance and vegetarianism and received many honours, which included the gold kaiser-I-hind medal, which he received for his work in the 1900 famine. The state would be further developed by his son Dilip Singh. Dilip Singh would improve the infrastructure of the state by building modern schools for both sexes and a hospital with a big maternity ward. Education was made free and compulsory, while medical aid was also provided free of charge during his reign. He took part in religious organisations and built the Krishna temple in Thanesar. He was also responsible for giving a democratic constitution to the local municipality. On 15 June 1948, Raja Dileep Singh signed the accession to the Indian Union.

== Royal Cuisine ==
In the days of the Princely era, Sailana was famous for its hospitality, cuisine and liquor. The tradition was started by Raja Sir Dilip Singh K.C.I.E of Sailana and was elaborated by his son Raja Digvijaya Singh. The Rajas of Sailana excelled in the culinary arts and invented many unique recipes apart from collecting recipes of bygone era from the Nizam of Hyderabad, Maharaja of Kashmir and Begum of Bhopal amongst others, from where emanated the most exotic culinary recipes. The recipes were translated from ancient recipe books in Sanskrit, Urdu and Persian to ensure that these recipes were preserved for posterity. The current head of the family, Vikram Singh, has a collection of more than 2,000 ancient recipes out of which only 164 have been made public through the cookbook, "Cooking Delights of the Maharajas" written by the former ruler of Sailana, Digvijay Singh.

== Cactus Garden ==
The Sailana Cactus garden was built by Raja Digvijay Singh in 1960. The garden is behind the Sailana Palace and has rare species of cactus. It was the first of its kind in India and once had the biggest collection of cacti in Asia.

== Kedareshwar Temples ==
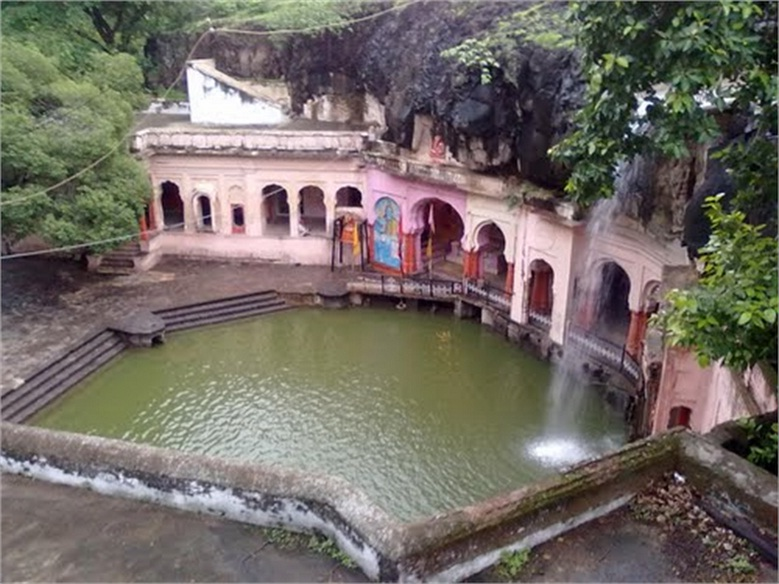
Kedareshwar temple.

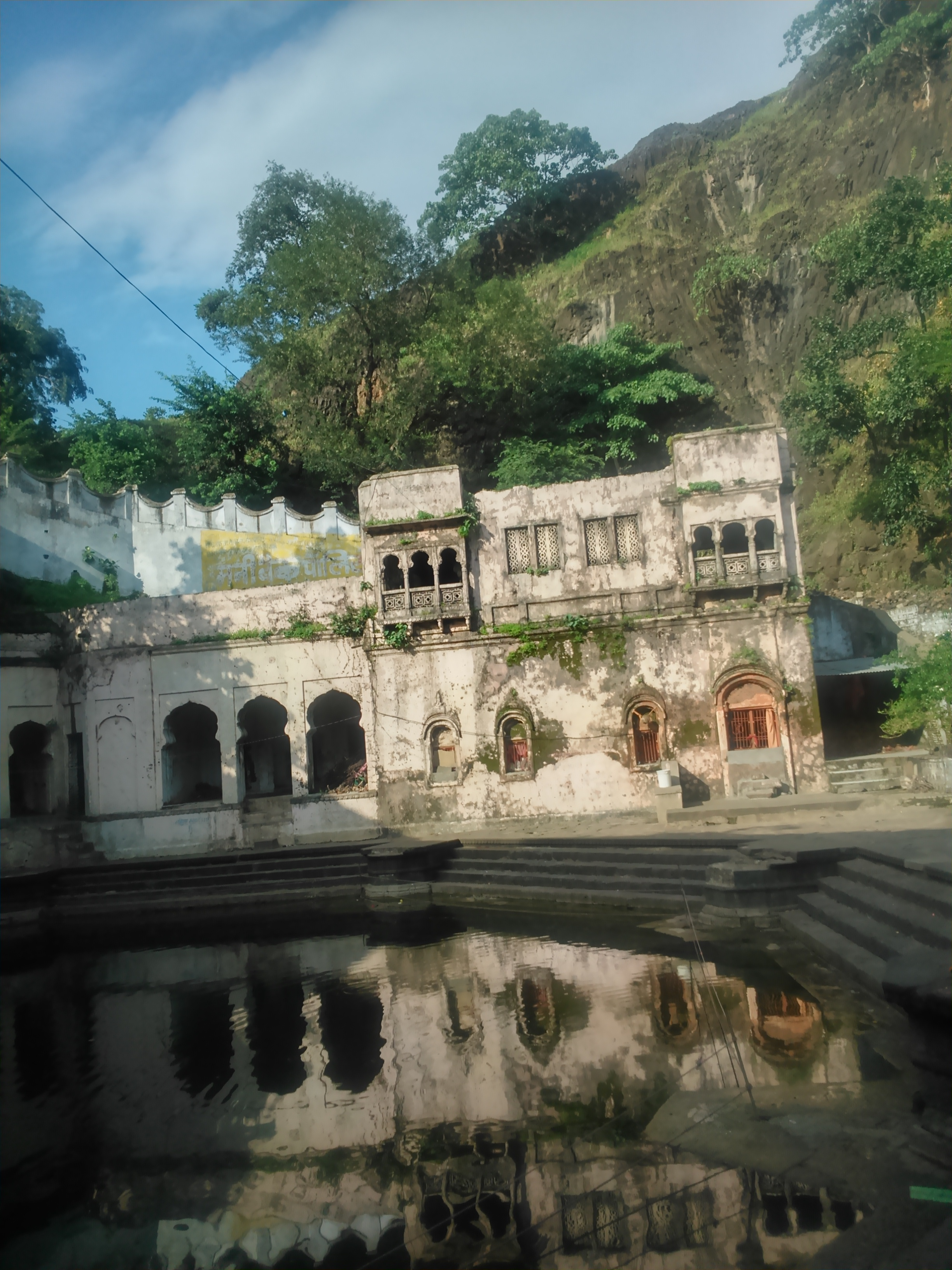
The small palace of Raja Duleh Singh built opposite the Kedareshwar temple.

The Kedareshwar temples (Bada Kedareshwar and Chota Kedareshwar) of Lord Shiva are famous in Sailana, there are two of them, both are 4 km from the fort in opposite directions. The temples are situated in man made caves carved out from a cliff of igneous rocks. The initial structure of Bada Kedareshwar was built by Raja Jai Singh (r.1736 – 1757), Raja Duleh Singh (r.1850 – 1895) later spent Rs.150,000 on the temple and built several structures in and around the temple including a man-made lake that flows over the temple. Chota Kedareshwar is built on a cliff which is surrounded by a small valley. From the top of the cliff, a small stream of monsoon rain water forms a waterfall and joins a small pond of water in the valley. From here a river originates and flows down into the plains of Rajasthan.

== Sailana Kharmour Bird Sanctuary ==
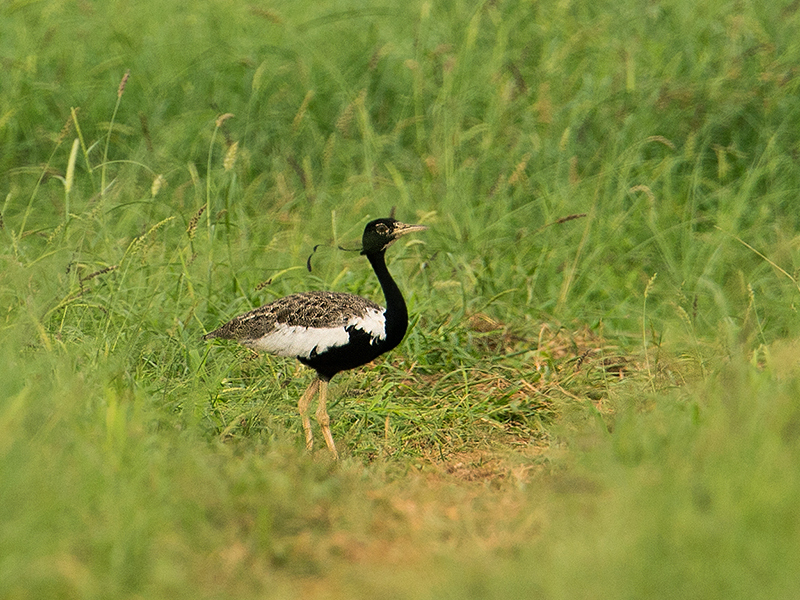
Lesser Florican or Kharmour are sighted in Sailana.

The Kharmour Bird Sanctuary, also known as Sailana Bird Sanctuary, is situated in Sailana Village of the Ratlam District. This sanctuary is spread in a total area of 13 km^{2} and was established in 1983. This sanctuary is home to and is named after the 'Kharmour' bird, a very rare species; and it is also a major stop for a wide variety of migratory birds. It is also one of the breeding habitats of Lesser Florican in India. The famous ornithologist Salim Ali visited the sanctuary and spotted 89 species of birds. This sanctuary is part of the Khathiar-Gir dry deciduous forests ecoregion. "This Sanctuary has been identified as an Internationally Important Bird Area. The habitat is predominantly tropical grassland interspersed with agricultural fields consisting of pure grasslands and grass patches in crop fields and grazing lands."

=== Threat ===
The Kharmour bird is facing a sharp decline due to encroachments and farming. The sanctuary in Sailana originally had teak and Palash trees. However, they have all been harvested and now the sanctuary is without any trees and is dominated by the grass Sehima nervosum-Chrysopogon fulvus. The use of pesticides on the encroached land has also led to a decline in insects, which has reduced the overall food source for the birds. The grassland continues to shrink without any intervention by the authorities.

== Education ==
The Government College in Sailana was founded in 1989. It is affiliated to Vikram University, Ujjain.

== Travelling distance from Sailana ==
The nearest city is Ratlam, 19 km from Sailana. Distances from other major places are,

City	km
Ratlam	19
Ujjain	95
Indore	127
Mandu	133
Maheshwar	158
Udaipur	175
Vadodara	219
Bhopal	256

== See also ==
- Sailana State
- Sailana (Vidhan Sabha constituency)
- Rathor Dynasty
