= Mahi Maratib =

Mughal Empire award

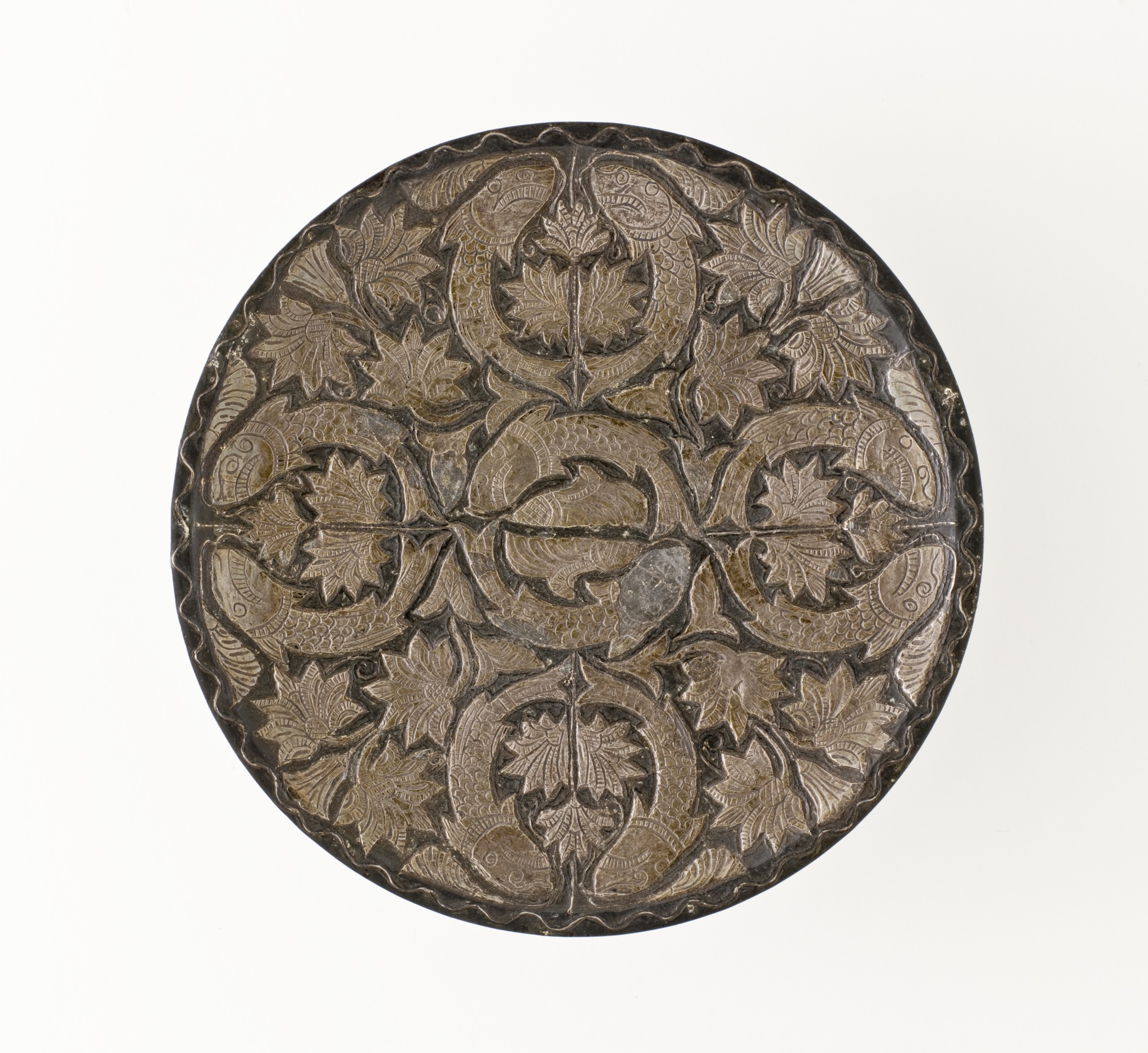
Plate with emblematic pairs of fish (mahi-ye maratib), Awadh, Lucknow, circa 1880

The Mahi Maratib was the highest honour bestowed by the emperor during the Mughal Empire. It was introduced during the reign of Mughal emperor Shah Jahan.

A standard made out of metal in the form of a fish head was normally carried. The fish was the goonch (Bagarius yarrelli). The standard was called Mahi Maratib, also spelled Mahi-maratib.

== See also ==
- Bharat Ratna
