= Ratlam =

City in Madhya Pradesh, India

- City
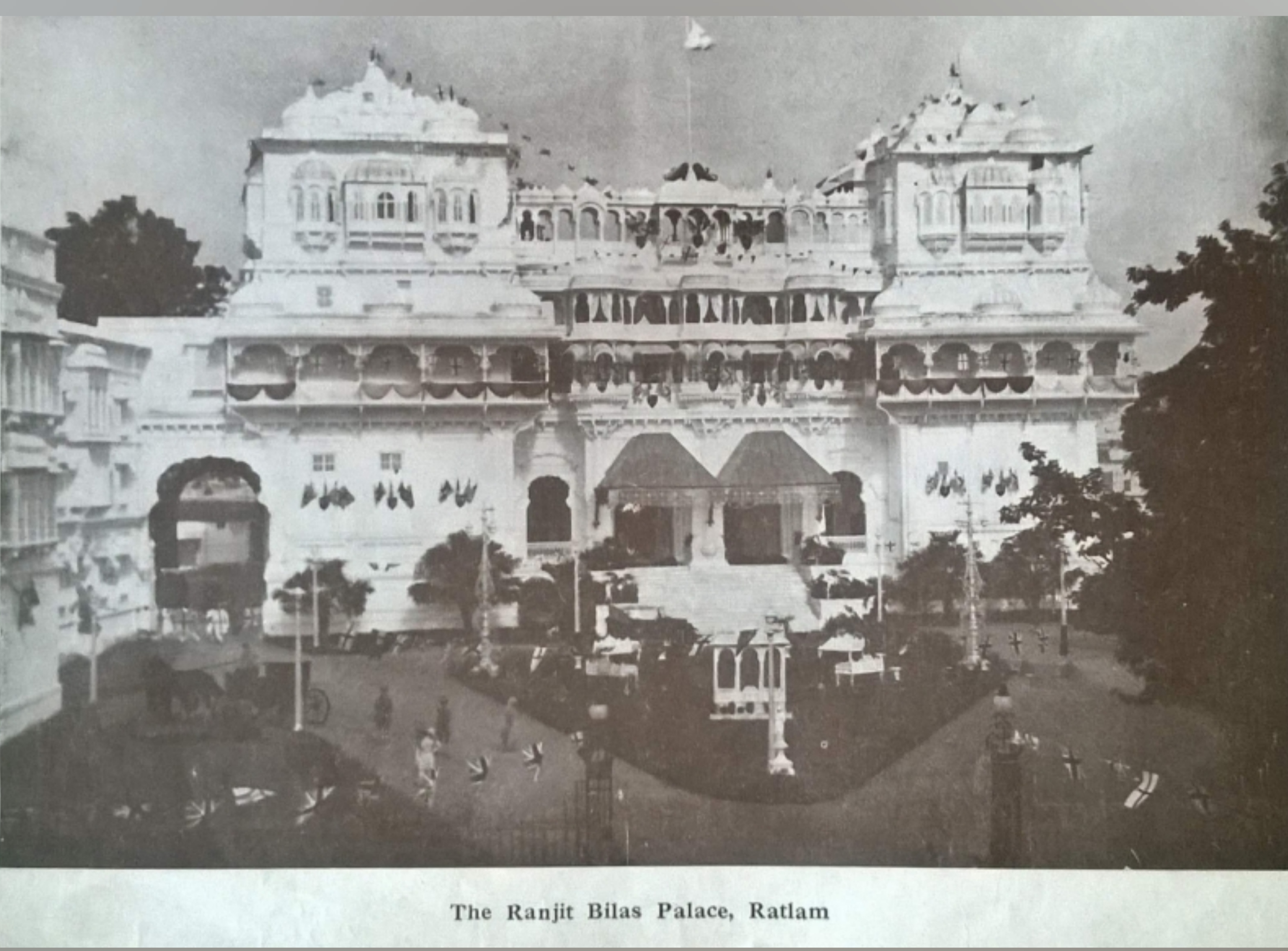
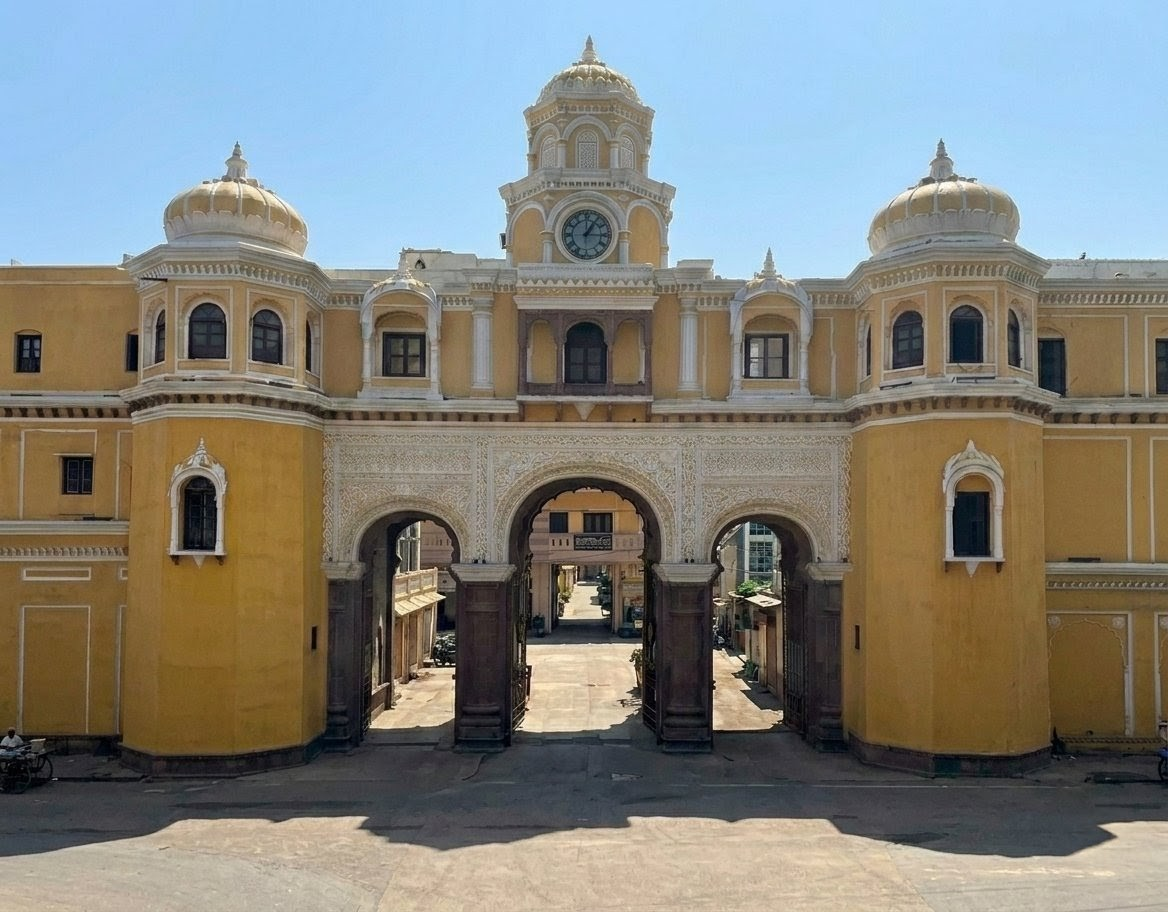
- Ranjit Vilas Palace, Ratlam Ghanta Ghar, Ratlam

- Location in Madhya Pradesh, India Ratlam (India)
- Coordinates: 23.334°N 75.037°E
- Country: India
- State: Madhya Pradesh
- Region: Malwa
- District: Ratlam
- Established: 1652; 374 years ago
- Founder: Ratan Singh
- Named for: Ratan Singh

Government
  - Body: Ratlam Municipal Corporation rmcratlam.in
  - MP: Anita Nagar Singh Chouhan (BJP)
  - Mayor: Prahlad Patel BJP

Area
  - Total: 39.19 km^{2} (15.13 sq mi)
- Elevation: 480 m (1,570 ft)

Population (2011)
  - Total: 264,914
  - Rank: 9th in Madhya Pradesh
  - Density: 6,760/km^{2} (17,510/sq mi)
- Demonym: Ratlami

Language
  - Official: Hindi
  - Regional: Malvi
- Time zone: UTC+5:30 (IST)
- PIN: 457001
- Telephone code: 07412
- Vehicle registration: MP-43
- Climate: Humid subtropical climate (Köppen)
- Precipitation: 937 millimetres (36.9 in)
- Avg. annual temperature: 24 °C (75 °F)
- Avg. summer temperature: 28 °C (82 °F)
- Avg. winter temperature: 16 °C (61 °F)
- Website: ratlam.nic.in

Ratlam (Hindi: IPA: [ɾət̪.laːm]),is a city in the northwestern part of the Malwa region in Madhya Pradesh state of India. The city of Ratlam lies 480 metres (1,570 ft) above sea level. It is the administrative headquarters of Ratlam district, which was created in 1947 after the independence of India. It is located 294 kilometres west of the state capital Bhopal.

In 2024 Indian general election, Anita Nagar Singh Chouhan of Bharatiya Janata Party was elected as the Member of Parliament from Ratlam.

Ratlam railway division is one of the six railway divisions under Western Railway zone of Indian Railways. Whose headquarters is in Ratlam city. This is an important railway junction of the state.

== History ==
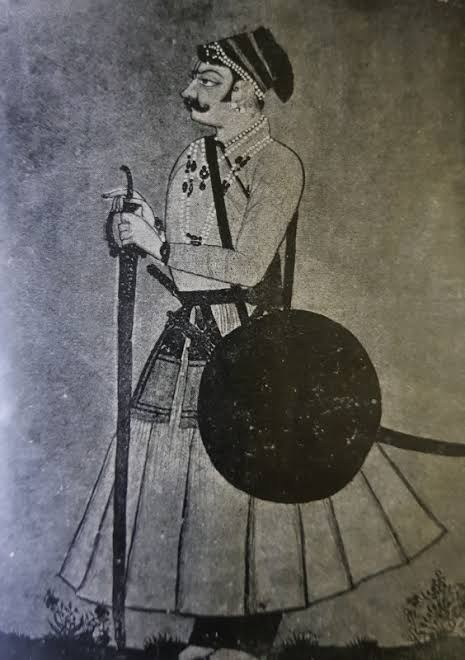
Maharajadhiraj Shree Huzur Ratan Singh, Bahadur of Ratlam.

Ratlam State was founded in 1648 when Ratan Singh Rathore at the age of 23, armed only with a dagger, boldly attacked a mad elephant rampaging in the streets of Delhi. An impressed Shah Jahan, the Mughal builder of the Taj Mahal, inducted him into the mansabdari (impe-rial administrative system), where the Rathore Rajput served with distinction. In 1648 Ratan Singh received a jagir in Malwa, a mansab rank of 3000, the emblem of the Mahi Maratib (Order of Fish), and settled in Ratlam village as his capital.

The new town of Ratlam was founded in 1829 by Captain Borthwick.

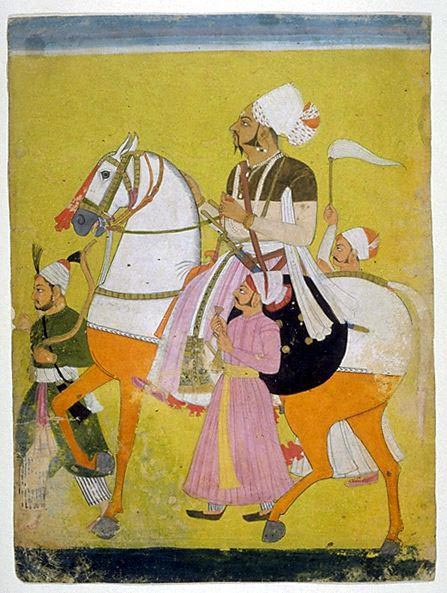
Padam Singh of Ratlam

The state was closely interlaced with the territories of the princely state of Sailana. In 1901, Ratlam State had a population of 83,773,

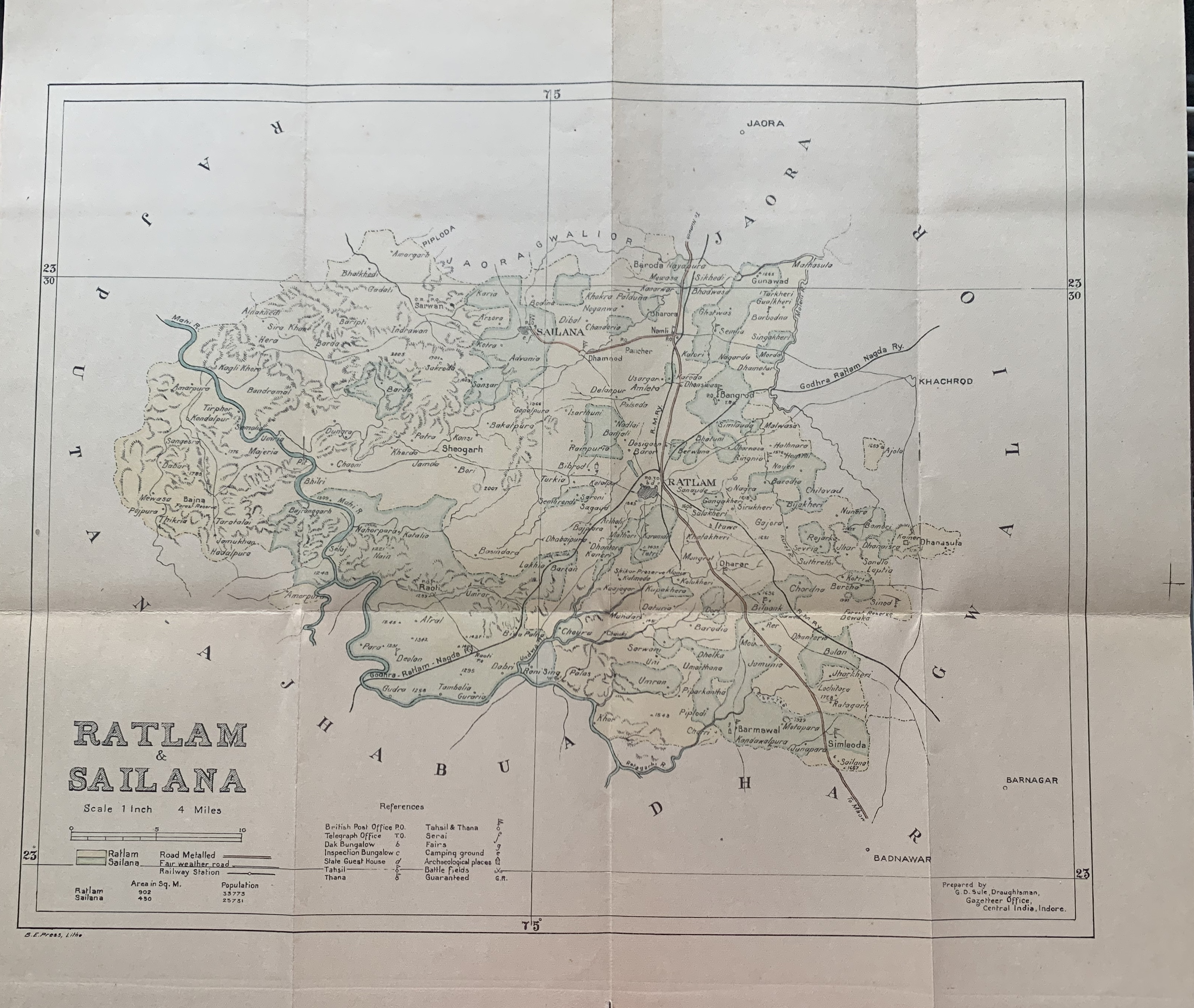
Map of Sailana and Ratlam States

== Geography ==
Ratlam is located at coordinates: 23°19′0″N 75°04′0″E (23.316667, 75.066667). The city has an area of 39 km^{2} (15 sq mi). It is very close to the borders of Rajasthan and Gujarat.

== Climate ==
Ratlam, like most of Madhya Pradesh, has tropical savanna climate (Köppen climate classification Aw) bordering humid subtropical climate (Cwa) zone. Three distinct seasons are observed: summer, monsoon and winter. Summers start in mid-March and can be extremely hot from April through June. Highs can reach 112 °F (44 °C), although the humidity is extremely low. The monsoon season starts in late June, with temperatures averaging around 100 °F (38 °C), with sustained, torrential rainfall and high humidity. The average rain fall is 37 in (940 mm). Winters start in mid-November and are dry, cool and sunny. Temperatures average about 39–46 °F (4–8 °C), but can fall close to freezing on some nights. Ratlam gets moderate rainfall of 35 to 38 inches (890 to 970 mm) from July through September, due to the southwest monsoon.

Climate data for Ratlam (1991–2020, extremes 1948–2009)
| Month | Jan | Feb | Mar | Apr | May | Jun | Jul | Aug | Sep | Oct | Nov | Dec | Year |
|---|---|---|---|---|---|---|---|---|---|---|---|---|---|
| Record high °C (°F) | 34.0 (93.2) | 37.8 (100.0) | 41.9 (107.4) | 45.2 (113.4) | 45.5 (113.9) | 45.0 (113.0) | 40.6 (105.1) | 38.7 (101.7) | 39.3 (102.7) | 39.0 (102.2) | 36.9 (98.4) | 33.8 (92.8) | 45.5 (113.9) |
| Mean daily maximum °C (°F) | 25.8 (78.4) | 28.5 (83.3) | 34.1 (93.4) | 38.4 (101.1) | 39.8 (103.6) | 36.3 (97.3) | 30.1 (86.2) | 28.2 (82.8) | 30.3 (86.5) | 33.0 (91.4) | 30.6 (87.1) | 27.6 (81.7) | 31.9 (89.4) |
| Mean daily minimum °C (°F) | 10.4 (50.7) | 12.7 (54.9) | 17.6 (63.7) | 22.9 (73.2) | 25.8 (78.4) | 25.1 (77.2) | 23.3 (73.9) | 22.8 (73.0) | 21.9 (71.4) | 19.0 (66.2) | 15.5 (59.9) | 11.8 (53.2) | 19.1 (66.4) |
| Record low °C (°F) | 2.5 (36.5) | 2.6 (36.7) | 9.0 (48.2) | 11.6 (52.9) | 18.4 (65.1) | 17.3 (63.1) | 18.1 (64.6) | 16.9 (62.4) | 14.0 (57.2) | 12.5 (54.5) | 7.9 (46.2) | 3.9 (39.0) | 2.5 (36.5) |
| Average rainfall mm (inches) | 3.1 (0.12) | 1.2 (0.05) | 1.7 (0.07) | 0.3 (0.01) | 8.9 (0.35) | 104.4 (4.11) | 363.9 (14.33) | 282.1 (11.11) | 119.1 (4.69) | 36.5 (1.44) | 2.4 (0.09) | 1.6 (0.06) | 925.2 (36.43) |
| Average rainy days | 0.3 | 0.3 | 0.3 | 0.1 | 0.7 | 5.8 | 13.8 | 12.4 | 6.0 | 1.4 | 0.1 | 0.2 | 41.5 |
| Average relative humidity (%) (at 17:30 IST) | 35 | 29 | 20 | 19 | 24 | 46 | 71 | 77 | 63 | 37 | 35 | 35 | 41 |
Source: India Meteorological Department

== Demographics ==
Religions in Ratlam city (2011)
| Religion | Percent |
| Hindus | 67.64% |
| Muslims | 24.08% |
| Jains | 6.63% |
Distribution of religions

According to the 2011 Census, the city of Ratlam has a population of 264,914 of which 134,915 are male and 129,999 are female. The sex ratio is 964 females to 1000 males. Children between the 0 to 6 years of age constitute 29,763 individuals. The total number of literates in Ratlam was 204,101, which constituted 77.0% of the population with male literacy of 81.2% and female literacy of 72.8%. The effective literacy rate of 7+ population of Ratlam was 86.8%, of which male literacy rate was 91.7% and female literacy rate was 81.8%. The Scheduled Castes and Scheduled Tribes population was 27,124 and 12,567 respectively. The total number of households in Ratlam is 53133. 28.17% Scheduled Tribe (Adivasi) of total population in Ratlam district. Adivasi group of Ratlam

== Railways ==
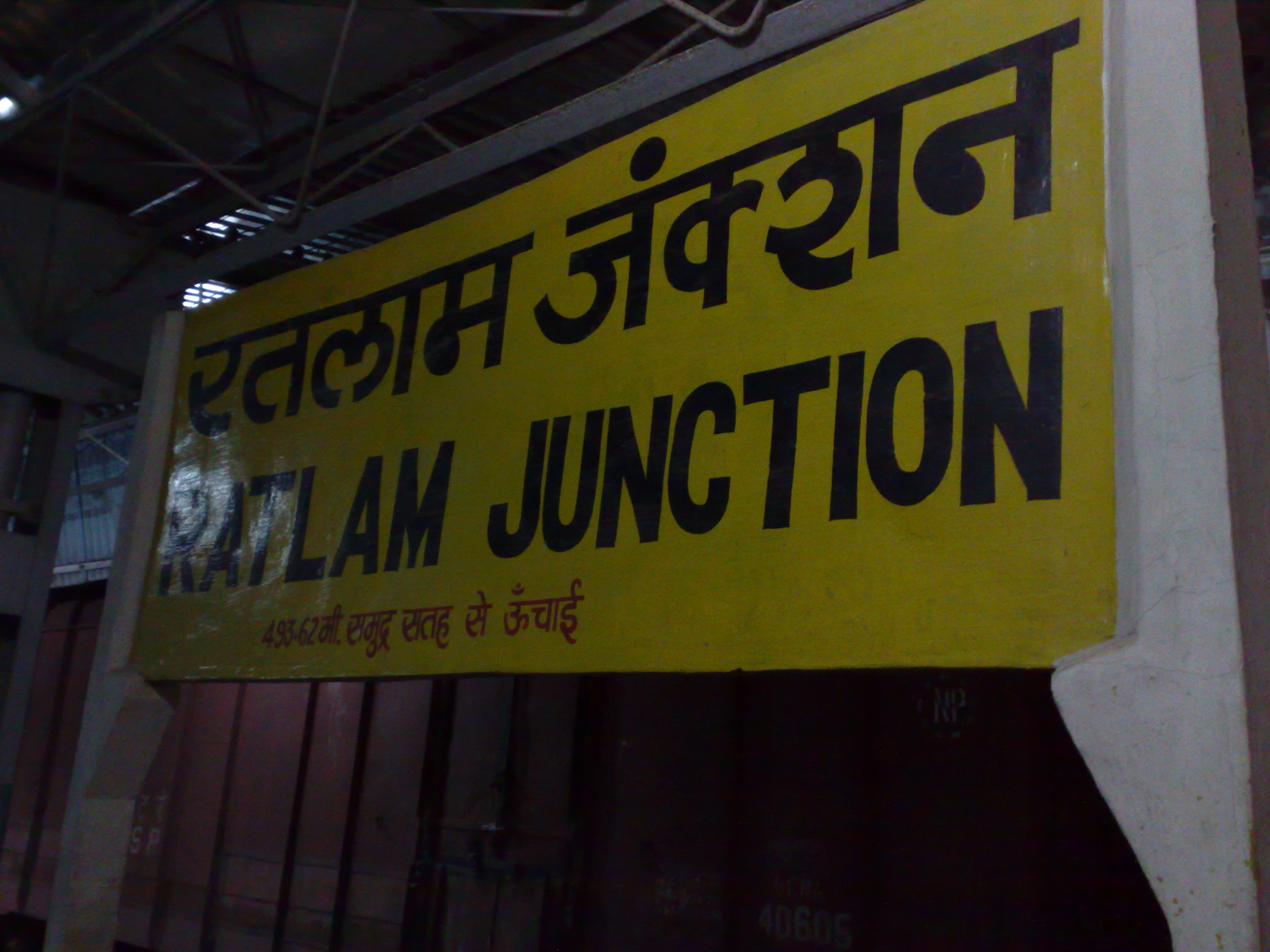
Ratlam Junction

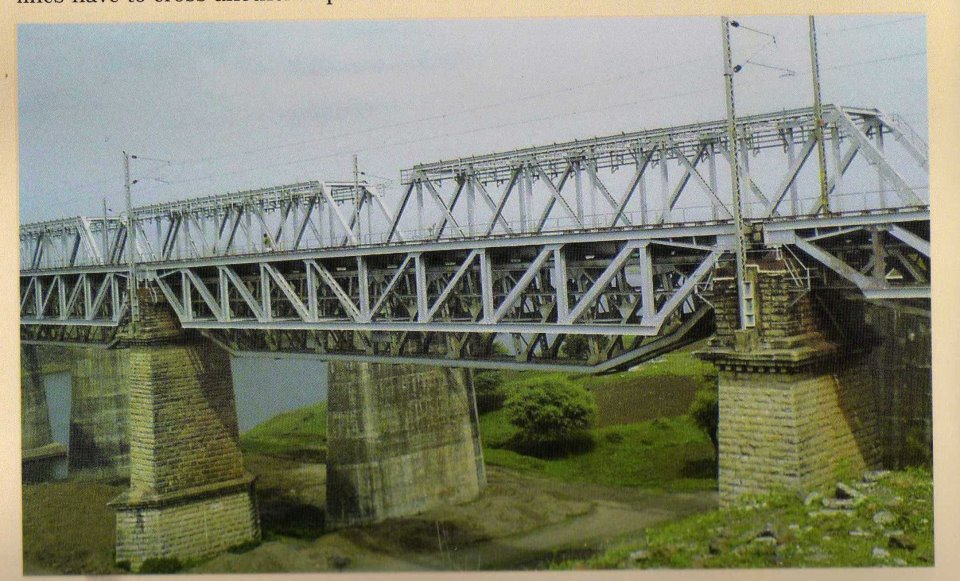
Mahi Railway Bridge Ratlam

Ratlam Junction is a major junction on Delhi-Mumbai and Ajmer-Khandwa Rail routes and rail division of Indian Railways on broad gauge lines on Western Railways Zone. Ratlam junction is Divisional headquarters of Western Railway Zone.

Ratlam is the first clean train station of Indian Railways network. Under this scheme, Indian Railways has introduced cleaning of coaches of a train en route while it halts at a particular station for 15 to 20 minutes. The entire train is cleaned with vacuum cleaners and toilets are washed with handheld portable HP cleaners.

Ratlam station is believed to be one of the busiest railway stations in India.

Ratlam Junction is referred to in the 2007 Hindi romantic comedy film Jab We Met.
