= Sailana State =

Princely state of India

Coordinates: 23.47°N 74.92°E

- Princely State
- 1736–1948
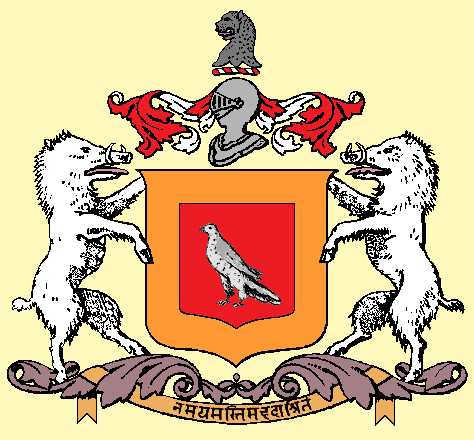
- Flag Coat of arms

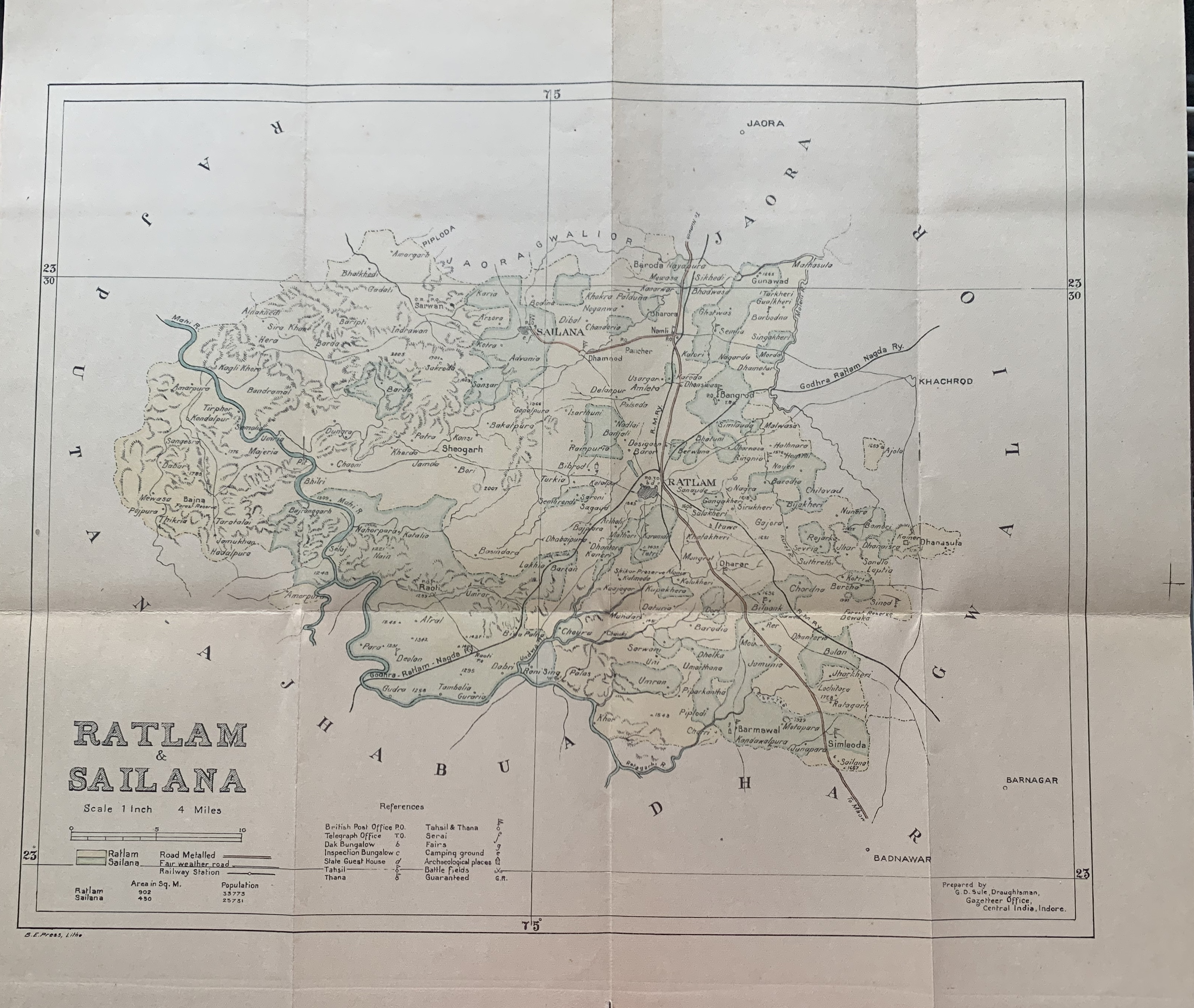
- A map showing the territories of Sailana State (in green).
- Capital: Sailana
- Area
  - 1881: 1,165 km^{2} (450 sq mi)
- History
  - Established: 1736
  - accession to the Indian Union: 1948
Succeeded by
India
- (Princely State)

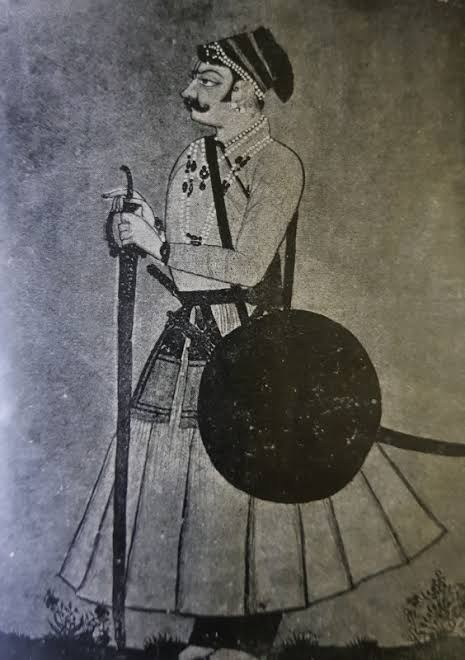
Painting of Maharaja Ratan Singh, the ancestor of the Rajas of Ratlam, Sailana and Sitamau.

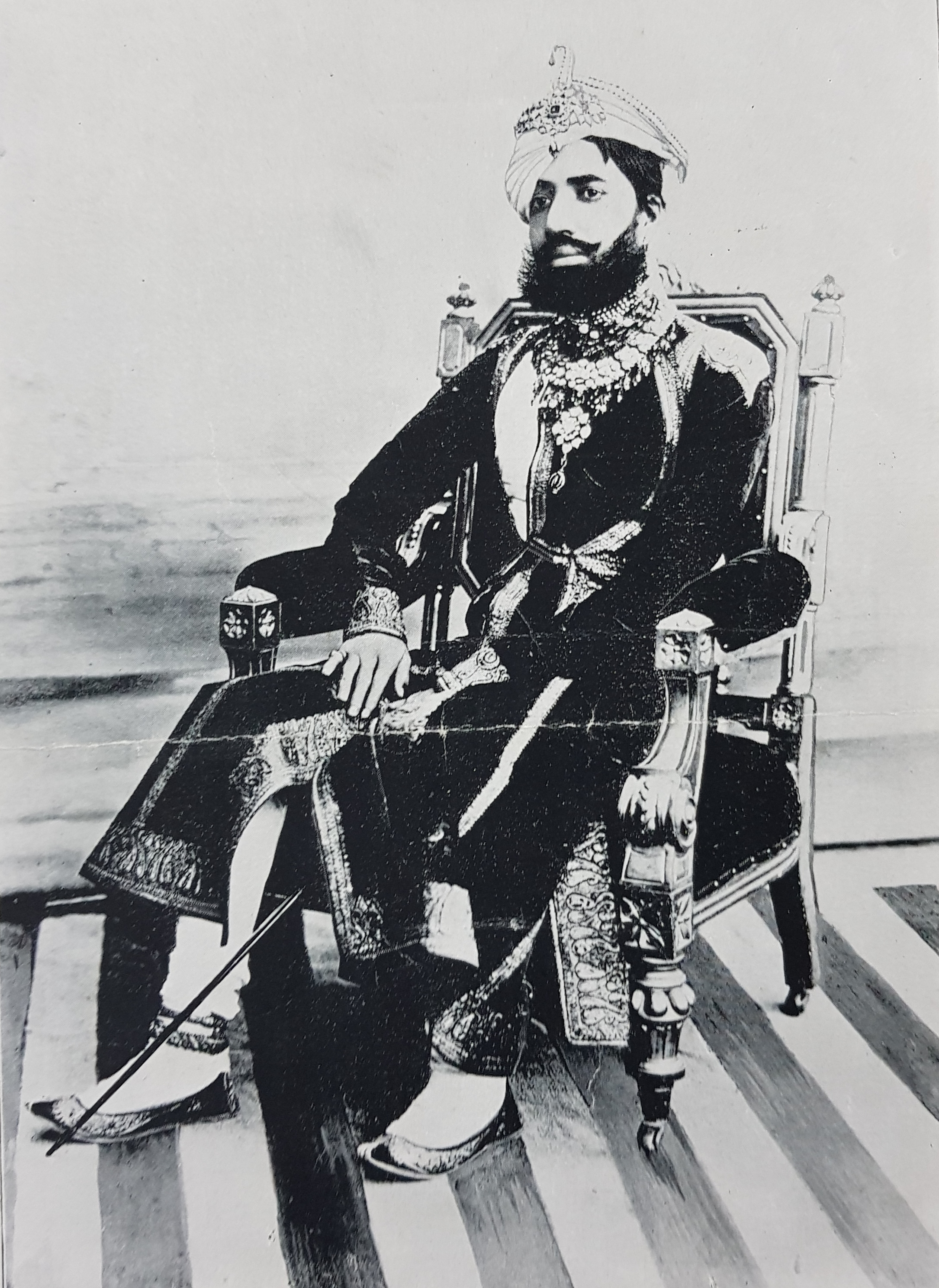
Jaswant Singh II, Raja of Sailana State (r.1895–1919)

Sailana State was an 11 gun salute princely state in India, part of the Malwa Agency of Central India during the British Raj. The state enjoyed an estimated revenue of Rs.5,00,000.

== History ==
Sailana State was founded by Raja Jai Singh, great-grandson of Maharaja Ratan Singh, founder of Ratlam State. It is a branch of the Rathore house. In 1716 Jai singh took revenge against his uncle for the murder of his father, he killed him in a pitched battle at sagode and secured Ratlam for his elder brother. The two brothers then divided the state between themselves. Jai Singh's capital was initially at Raoti. He built Sailana as his new capital in 1736. During this period the Maratha influence in central India had been growing and several states had been annexed or forced to pay heavy tributes to the Peshwa. However Jai Singh had the wisdom to form alliances with the Maratha officials, he helped the Peshwa agent Ambaji Pant Trimbak Purandare to collect tribute in Malwa and used the situation to annex the surrounding lands. He fought 22 battles in his lifetime, establishing himself as an independent ruler. Jai Singh maintained an army that was feared by the surrounding states forcing some states to take Holkar's aid against him. The Raja of Sailana favoured Rajputs and Pathans as horsemen while the infantry was drawn from the local populace. His descendant Mokham Singh however replaced this army composition with a surplus of elephants and emptied the state coffers, allowing the Marathas and Pindaris to encroach and loot with impunity. Jai Singh was succeeded by a string of weak rulers. During Raja Mokham Singh's rule much of the territory of Sailana was annexed by Scindia and Holkar, the Raja's of Sailana were further forced to pay tribute to the Scindias of Gwalior. Raja Lakshman Singh of Sailana tried to push the Scindia's out of his kingdom, in 1818 he refused to pay chauth which was regularly levied, the Scindias retaliated by sending an army under Bujang Rao, the Gwalior army which had European arms and was French trained lost its advantage on the hills en route to Sailana and was defeated by Lakshman Singh, the captured soldiers were allowed to leave but all of their guns and artillery were taken. In 1819, Bapu Rao Sindia was appointed to punish the raja of Sailana and enforce tribute upon him. Bapu Rao had previously been sent by the Scindia's to defeat and exact tributes from the Maharaja of Jaipur and the Maharana of Udaipur. On 5 January 1819, John Malcolm mediated between Gwalior and Sailana upon which Raja Lakshman Singh accepted British protection and agreed to pay a fixed tribute to Gwalior until 1860, in return for Daulat Rao Sindhia agreeing to refrain from any interference in Sailana. The tribute treaty did not last for long as Daulat Rao soon relinquished his rights of tribute on Sailana and Ratlam, the tribute was thus paid directly to the British instead. During British rule Sailana saw development under the capable rule of Raja Jashwant Singh II and then under his son Raja Dileep Singh, many reforms were introduced over the coming years, with particular attention being paid to education and the provision of vernacular educational facilities. By 1947, education and medical aid were provided free of charge, the local municipality was placed on a democratic footing and the judiciary and executive made independent of each other. Although the economy was primarily agricultural, some limited industrialisation included oil mills, and iron and steel works. On 15 June 1948, Raja Dileep Singh signed the accession to the Indian Union.

== Rulers ==
The chiefs of Sailana are Rathore Rajputs and have a common ancestry with the Maharajas of Jodhpur and Ratlam.

=== Rajas ===
Name	Year
Raja Jai Singh	1736–1757
Raja Jaswant Singh I	1757–1772
Raja Ajab Singh	1772–1782
Raja Mokham Singh	1782–1797
Raja Lakshman Singh	1797–1826
Raja Ratan Singh	1826–1827
Raja Nahar Singh	1827–1841
Raja Takhat Singh	1841–1850
Rajmata Nath Kanwarji (regent)	1850–1859
Raja Duleh Singh	1850–1895
HH Maharaja SirJashwant Singh II	1895–1919
HH Maharaja Sir Dileep Singh	1919 – 1948 (1948 – 1961 titular)
Maharaja Digvijay Singh (titular)	1961–1990
Maharaja Vikram Singh (titular)	1990 – present

== Jagirdars of Sailana State ==
All the jagirdars owe fealty and service to the ruler and pay cesses and tanka. No jagirdar has the right to adopt without the permission of the raja. The 1st class jagirdars are allowed to wear gold anklets, and at their succession, they are installed by the ruling raja himself. Half of the states lands were alienated because of the large number of Jagirs. Raja Dilip Singh (r. 1919–1948) later extinguished several Jagirs and replaced them with governors. This harsh but effective action helped the states revenue which was then used to provide medical and educational facilities in Sailana.

The following were the 1st class Jagirdars of Sailana in 1908.

Name	Revenue (Rs.)	Dynasty
Kaneri & Birmawal	30,000	Rathore
Semlia	30,000	Rathore
Raoti	20,000	Rathore
Kariya	17,000	Rathore

The following were the 2nd class Jagirdars of Sailana in 1908.

Name	Revenue (Rs.)	Dynasty
Ghatwas	5,000	Rathore
Umran	4,000	Songara
Nayapura	1,100	Rathore
Nalkui	1,700	Songara
Kotria	1,200	Rathore
Bharoda	4,000	Rathore
Advania	6,000	Rathore
Morda	4,000	Rathore

== See also ==
- List of Rajput dynasties and states
- Malwa Agency
- Kaneri Thikana
