= Sitamau =

- Town
- Location in Madhya Pradesh, India Sitamau (India)
- Coordinates: 24.02°N 75.35°E
- Country: India
- State: Madhya Pradesh
- District: Mandsaur
- Elevation: 457 m (1,499 ft)

Population (2011)
  - Total: 15,000

Languages
  - Official: Hindi
- Time zone: UTC+5:30 (IST)
- Postal code: 458990
- ISO 3166 code: IN-MP
- Vehicle registration: MP

Sitamau is a town and a nagar panchayat in Mandsaur district in the Indian state of Madhya Pradesh. It is in the Mandsaur district of Malwa region of Madhya Pradesh.

It was the seat of the princely Sitamau State.

== Demographics ==
As of 2001 India census, Sitamau had a population of 12,889. Males constitute 51% of the population and females 49%. Sitamau has an average literacy rate of 71%, higher than the national average of 59.5%: male literacy is 79%, and female literacy is 26%.

== Notable people ==
King Sattaji Bhil was a founder of Sitamau in 1700.
