= Naubat Khan =

Indian classical music musician and composer

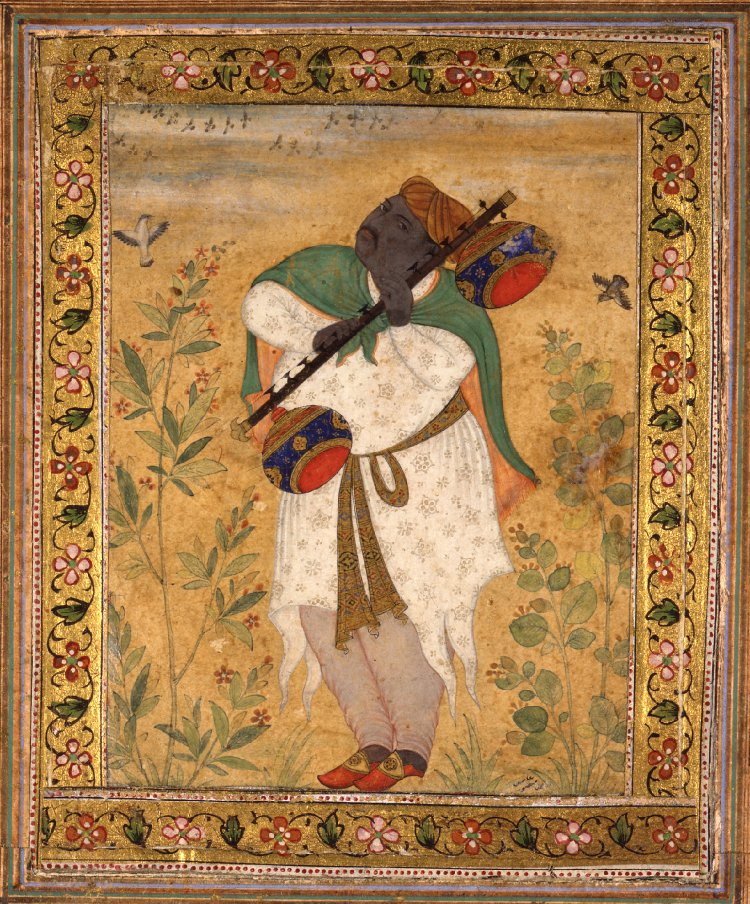
- Portrait of Naubat Khan Kalawant by Ustad Mansur, Mughal School ca. 1600, British Museum, London.

Background information
- Born: Misri Singh; Kishangarh, Rajasthan
- Genre: Hindustani Classical Music
- Occupations: Karori, Beenkar, Classical Mughal Era Musician, Darogha of Naqqar Khana
- Instrument: Rudra veena

Naubat Khan (also known as Ali Khan Karori) was an Indian classical music composer, musician and instrumentalist who was made a Mansabdar by Mughal Emperor Akbar. He is known today for his skills with the rudra veena or bīn, which he is shown playing in paintings by Mughal court artists. Naubat Khan was the contemporary and son in law of legendary Tansen.

== Early life and background ==
Naubat Khan was the grandson of Raja Samokhan Singh of Kishangarh. Samokhan Singh, a Jodhpur prince, was himself a great veena player of his time.

As the Mughal Emperor Akbar fought his wars of conquest in India, he fought against Raja Samokhan Singh. Singh was defeated in the battle and his grandson Misri Singh (Naubat Khan) was kept under house arrest. Misri Singh later accepted Islam and was named Ali. He was trained under Abdul Rahim Khan-I-Khana, the son of Bairam Khan to get an understanding of the Mughal court procedures. Ali was given the title of Khan by Mughal Emperor Akbar, and the post of Karori, i.e. Collector of revenue. He was later given the prestigious position of the darogha of the Naqqar Khana. As mentioned in Tuzk-e-Jahangiri, Ali Khan Karori was given the title of Naubat Khan and promoted to the rank of 500 personnel and 200 horse on 9 July 1607 (Gregorian), or 14 Rabi ul Awwal 1016 (Hijri), during Jahangir's visit to Kabul.

== Marriage ==
Mughal Emperor Akbar himself arranged the marriage of Naubat Khan to Tansen's daughter, Saraswati. Saraswati accepted Islam and was named Hussaini. They had a son named Lal Khan. Lal Khan was the son-in-law of Tansen's son Bilas Khan. Lal Khan would become the chief musician of Mughal Emperor Shahjahan. Shahajahan conferred on him the title of Gunsamundra.

== Subject of individual portrait ==
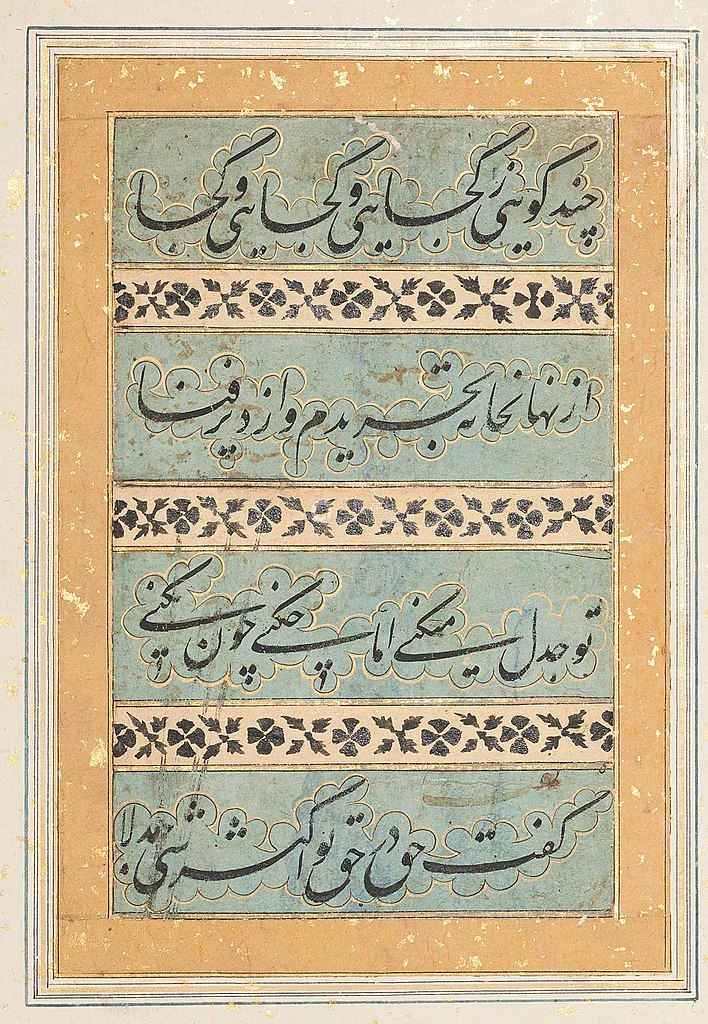
A double sided Muraqqa Folio, The Verso Folio, ca. 1580-1600.

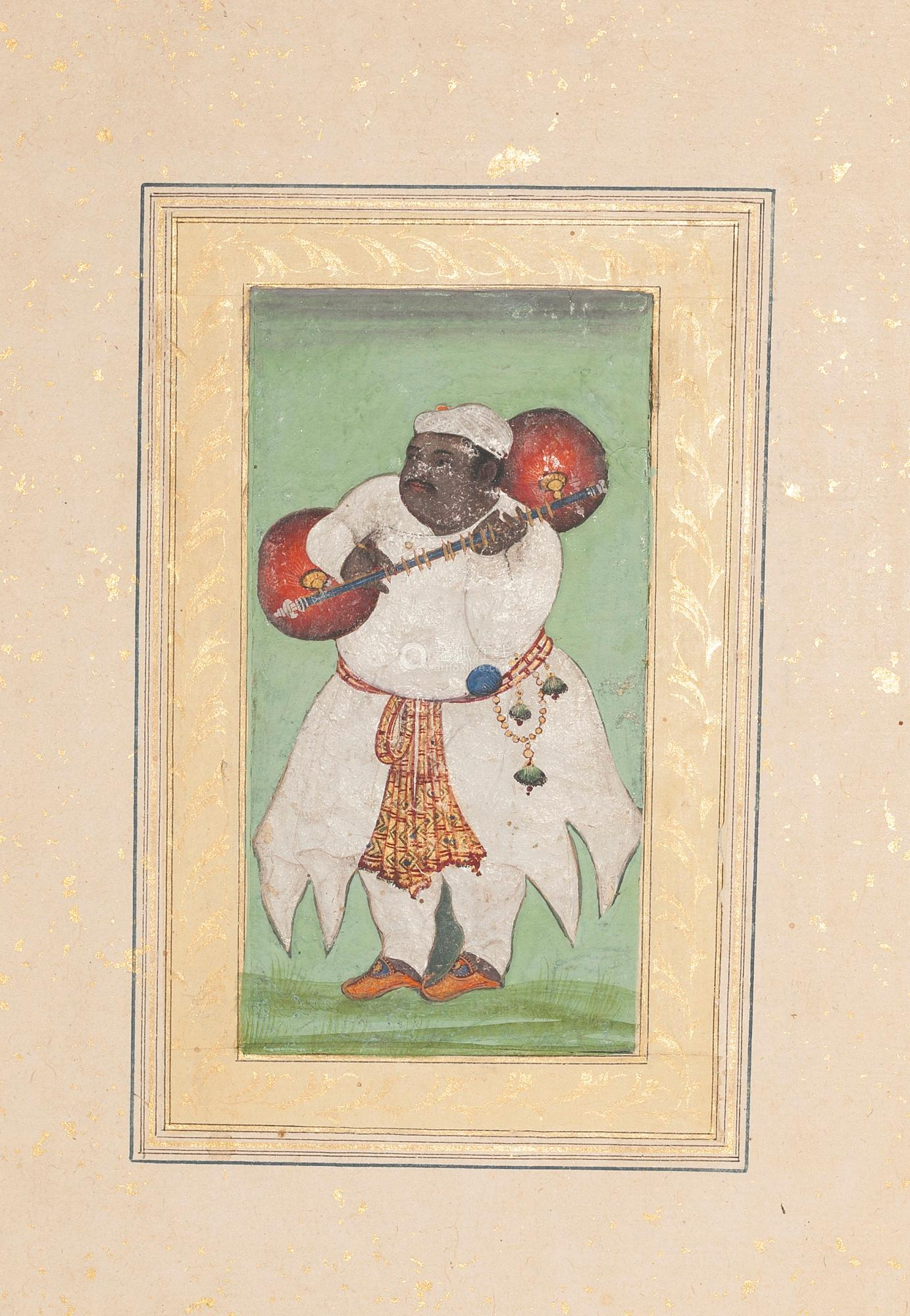
The musician Naubat Khan playing a rudra vina (front side), ca. 1580-1600.

Only highly ranked figures of the court enjoyed the privilege of being painted alone or within an assembly by the painters of the court, and Naubat Khan is one of the rare musicians (along with the illustrious singer-composer Tansen) to have been the subject of an individual portrait. Both Tansen and Naubat Khan were individually immortalized by artists of the Imperial atelier during the reign of Mughal Emperor Akbar.

A well-known portrait of Naubat Khan painted during Akbar's reign and attributed to the artist Mansur, is held in the British Museum. Another tinted drawing of him is in the Museum of Fine Arts, Boston and yet another from the Edwin Binney 3rd Collection is presently held in the San Diego Museum of Art. In a fourth portrait from Karl and Meherbai Khandalavala Collection a plump Naubat Khan is standing crossed-legged and playing a Rudra Veena (stringed instrument). He is wearing a striped pajama and translucent muslin jama. An inscription on the top identifies him as Naubat Khan, the son-in-law of Tansen, (famous musician of Emperor Akbar’s court).Presently held in Chhatrapati Shivaji Maharaj Vastu Sangrahalaya, Mumbai.

In a fifth portrait of Naubat Khan, part of a Double Sided Muraqqa Folio, Naubat Khan is shown playing a rudra vina, or bin, with its large round orange gourds, wearing an Akbar period white muslin chakdar (four pointed) jama with a small white kulhadar (an early Akbar-style turban) on his head. The reverse side of the image has calligraphic nasta'liq script. It contains a work of poetry (possibly Sufi poetry), reading:

چند گویی ز کجایی و کجایی و کجا
chand gu'i ze kojā'i o kojā'i o kojā
از نهانخانه تجریدم و از دیر فنا
az nahān-khāneh-ye tajridam o az deyr fanā
تو جدل میکنی اما چکنی چون نکنی
to jadal mi-koni amā che-koni chun na-koni
گفت حق در حق تو اکثر شی جدلا
goft haqq dar haqq-e to aksar-e shay jadalā

Translation

"How many times will you ask: Where are you? Where are you? Where?
I am from the closet of separation and from the transitory world.
You dispute, but what will you achieve if you do not?
He said: Truth, you will always be the cause of disagreement".

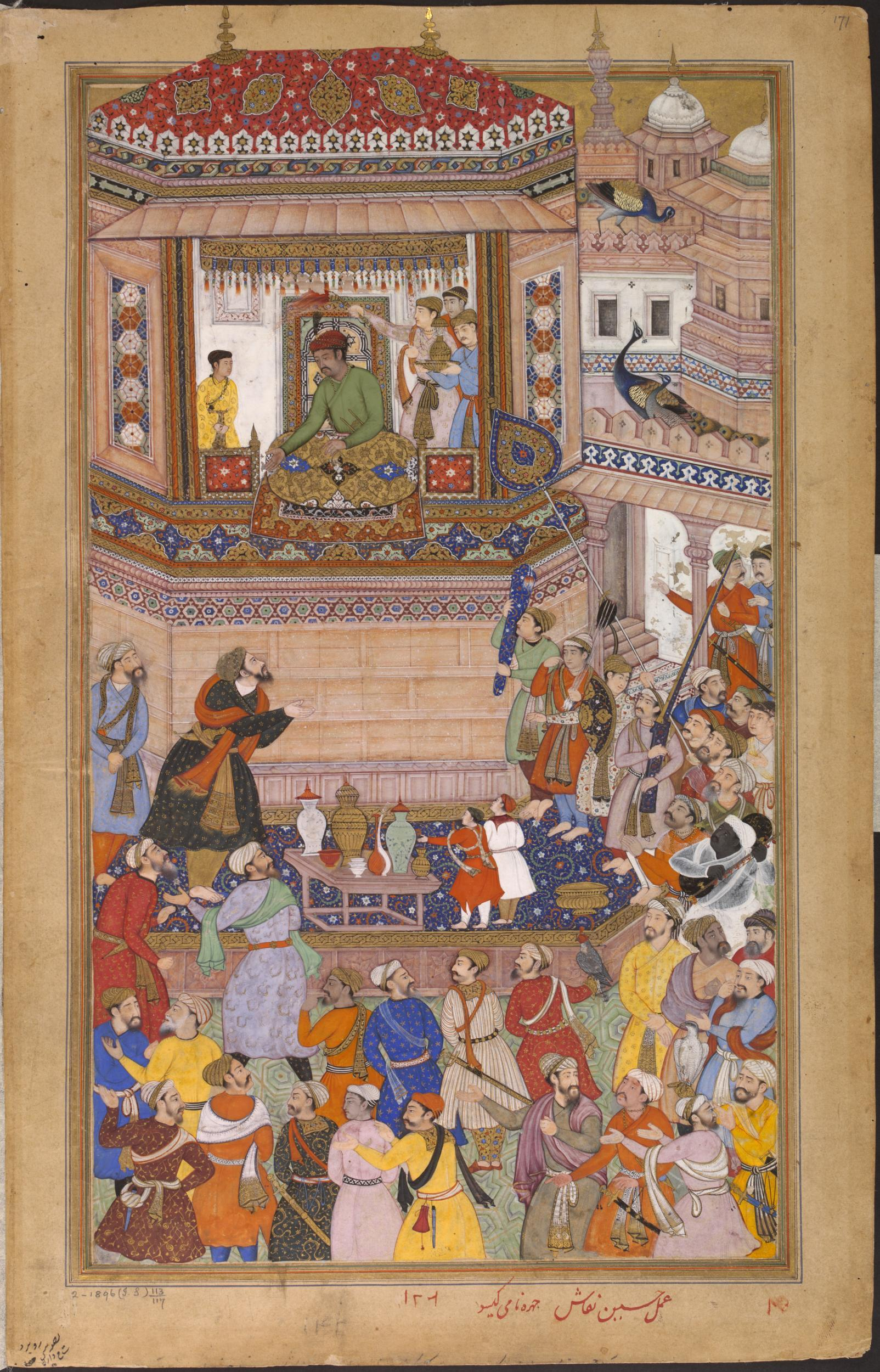
Hussain Quli presents prisoners of war to Akbar, a view of the bin player Naubat Khan (in white dress holding Rudra Vina). Illustration from the Akbar-nama, Mughal school, towards 1590.Victoria & Albert Museum U.K.

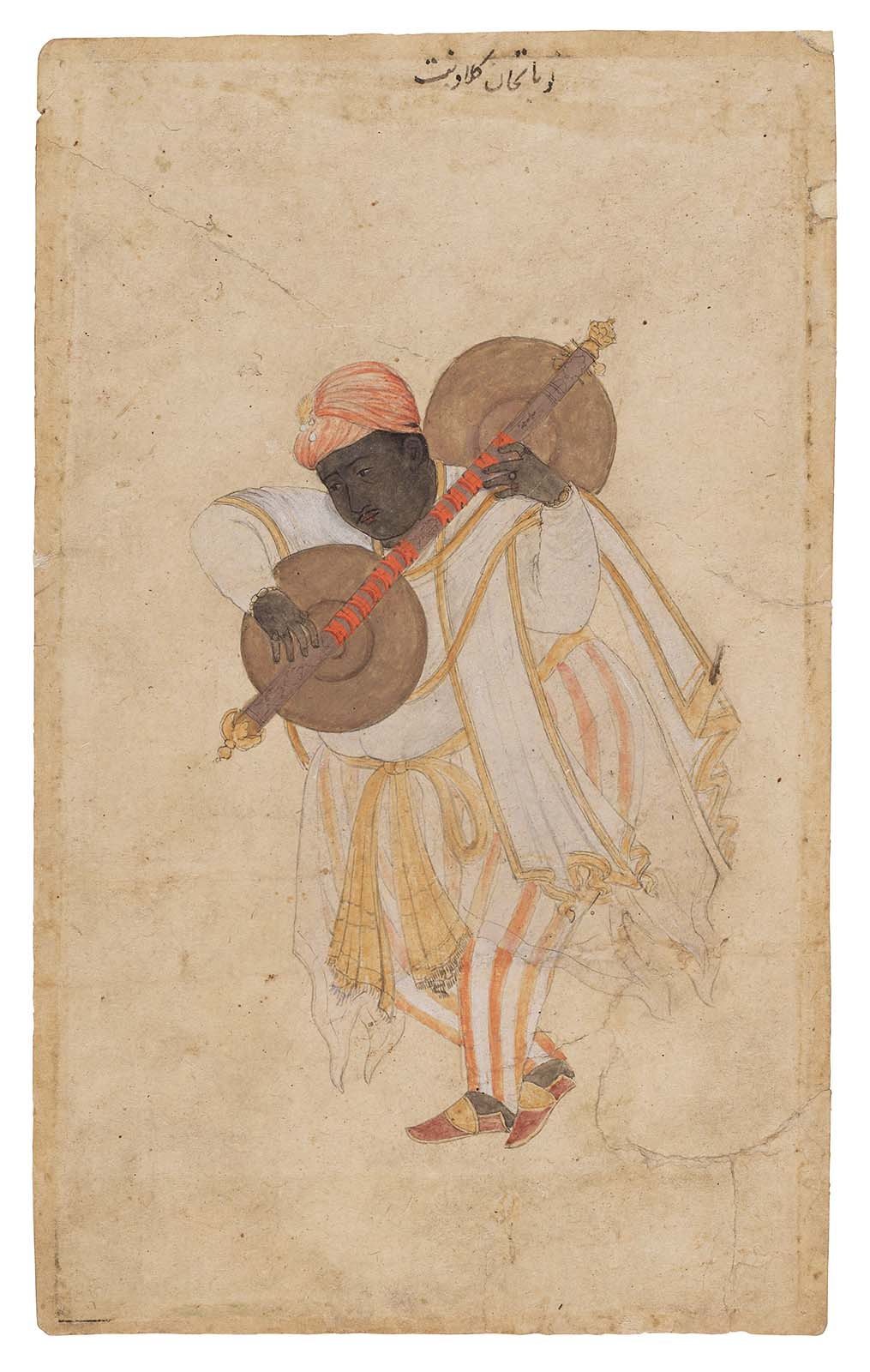
India, Mughal period. Naubat Khan the Vina Player, Museum of Fine Arts, Boston.

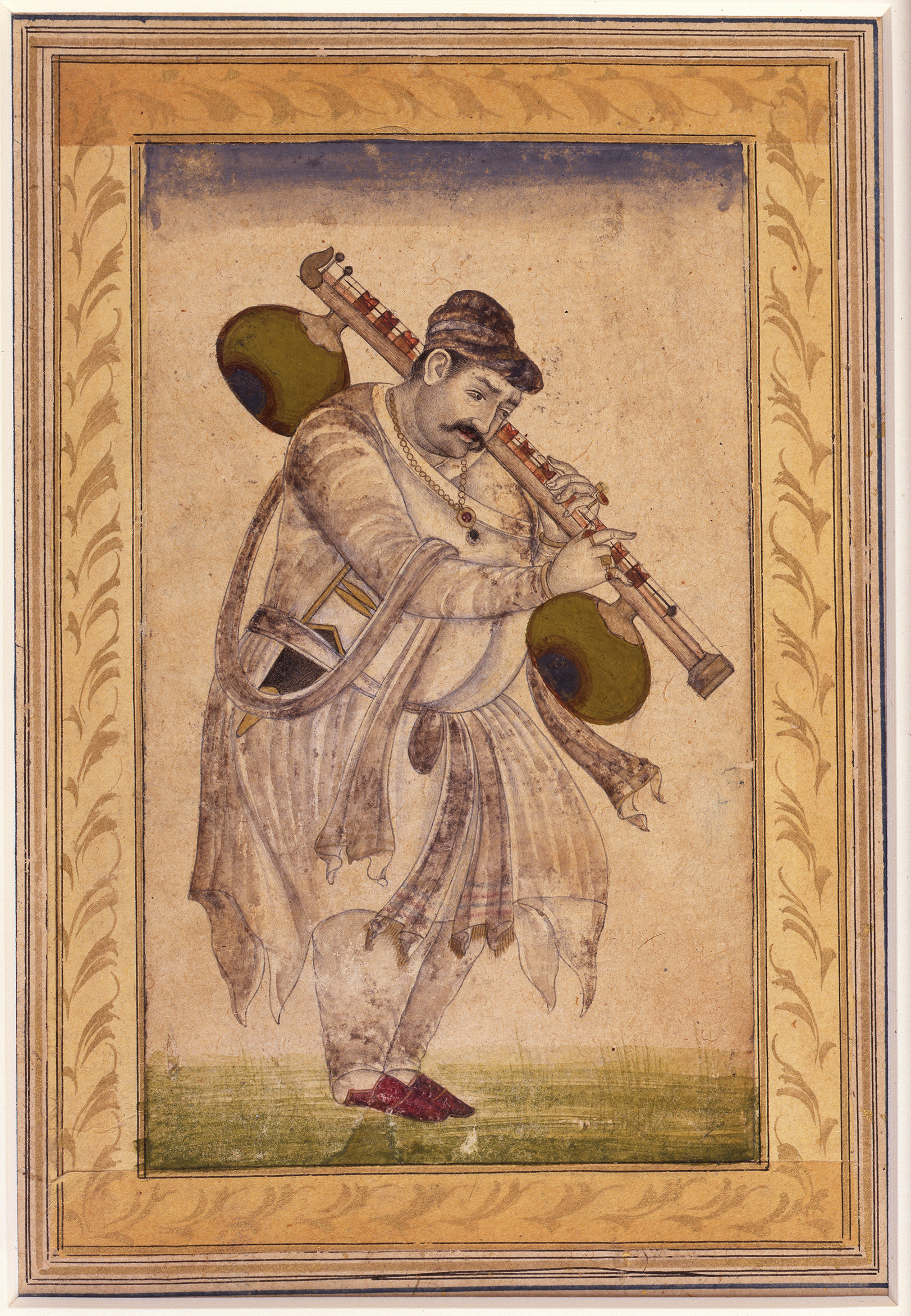
18th century C.E. portrait of Naubat Khan Kalawant, San Diego Museum of Art, Edwin Binney 3rd Collection.

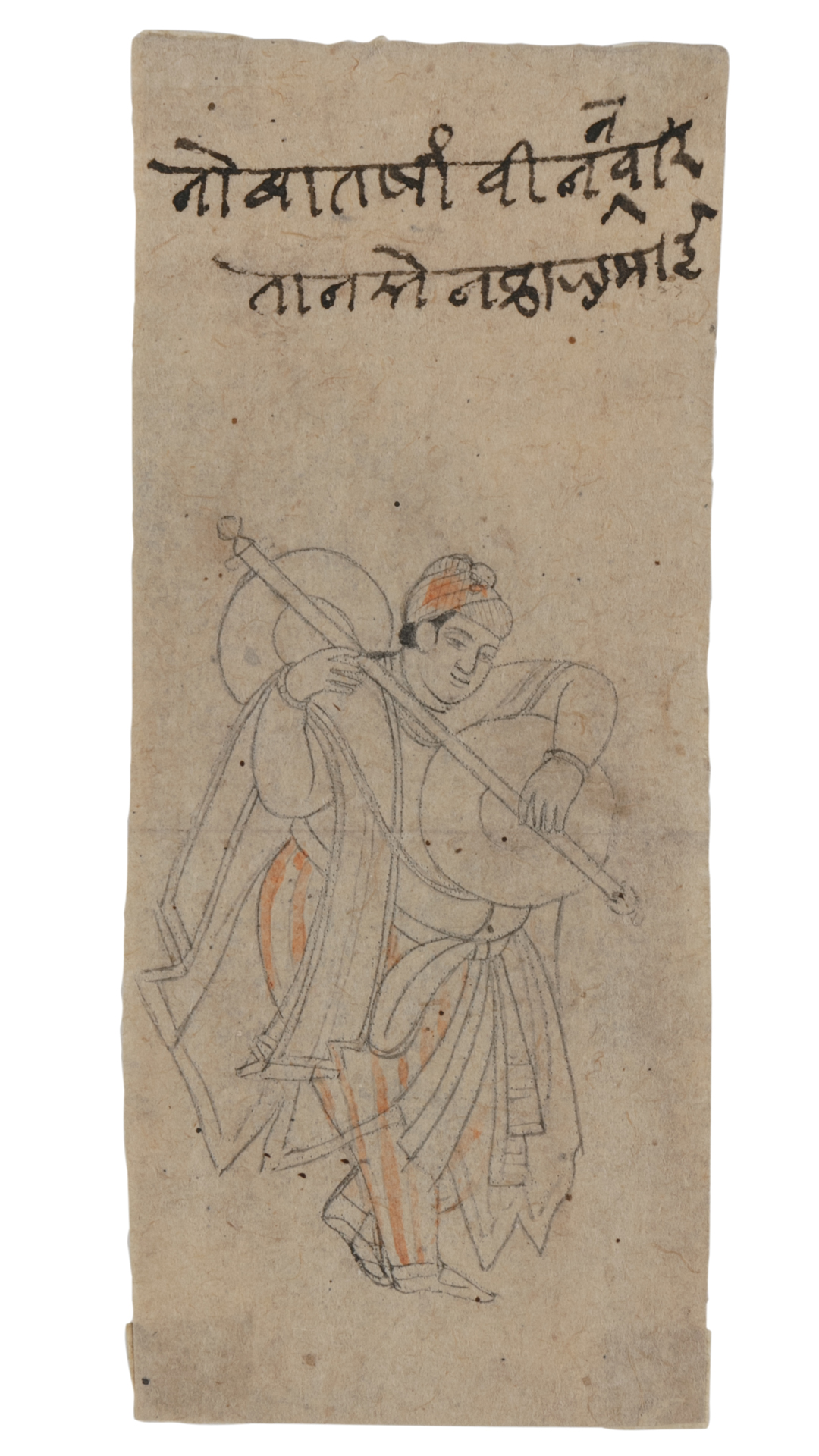
Naubat Khan playing a Been.Mughal Miniature Painting, Circa 1600.Karl and Meherbai Khandalavala Collection,Chhatrapati Shivaji Maharaj Vastu Sangrahalaya.

== Beenkar dynasty ==
Naubat Khan was the founder of the beenkar or binkar dynasty of India. His direct descendants commanded respect in musical circles for several centuries. Notable members of this family are

- Lal Khan Gunsamundra (chief musician of Shahjahan, son-in-law of Tansen's son Bilas Khan)
- Khushal Khan Gunsamundra (title of Gunsamundra conferred by Shahjahan, chief musician at the court of Mughal Emperor Shahjahan and Mughal Emperor Aurangzeb).
- Bisram Khan (son of Lal Khan Gunsamundra, One of the Chief musicians at the court of Mughal Emperor Shahjahan and Mughal Emperor Aurangzeb).
- Bhupat Khan
- Sadarang (chief musician of Mughal Emperor Muhammad Shah)
- Adarang
- Sidhar Khan
- Omrao Khan Beenkar
- Ameer Khan
- Wazir Khan (Master of Nawab Hamid Ali Khan of Rampur, Allauddin Khan, Hafiz Ali Khan, Vishnu Narayan Bhatkhande)
- Dabir Khan

== See also ==
- Hindustani classical music
- Sadarang
