= Wazir Khan (Rampur) =

Indian Classical Vocalist (1860–1926)

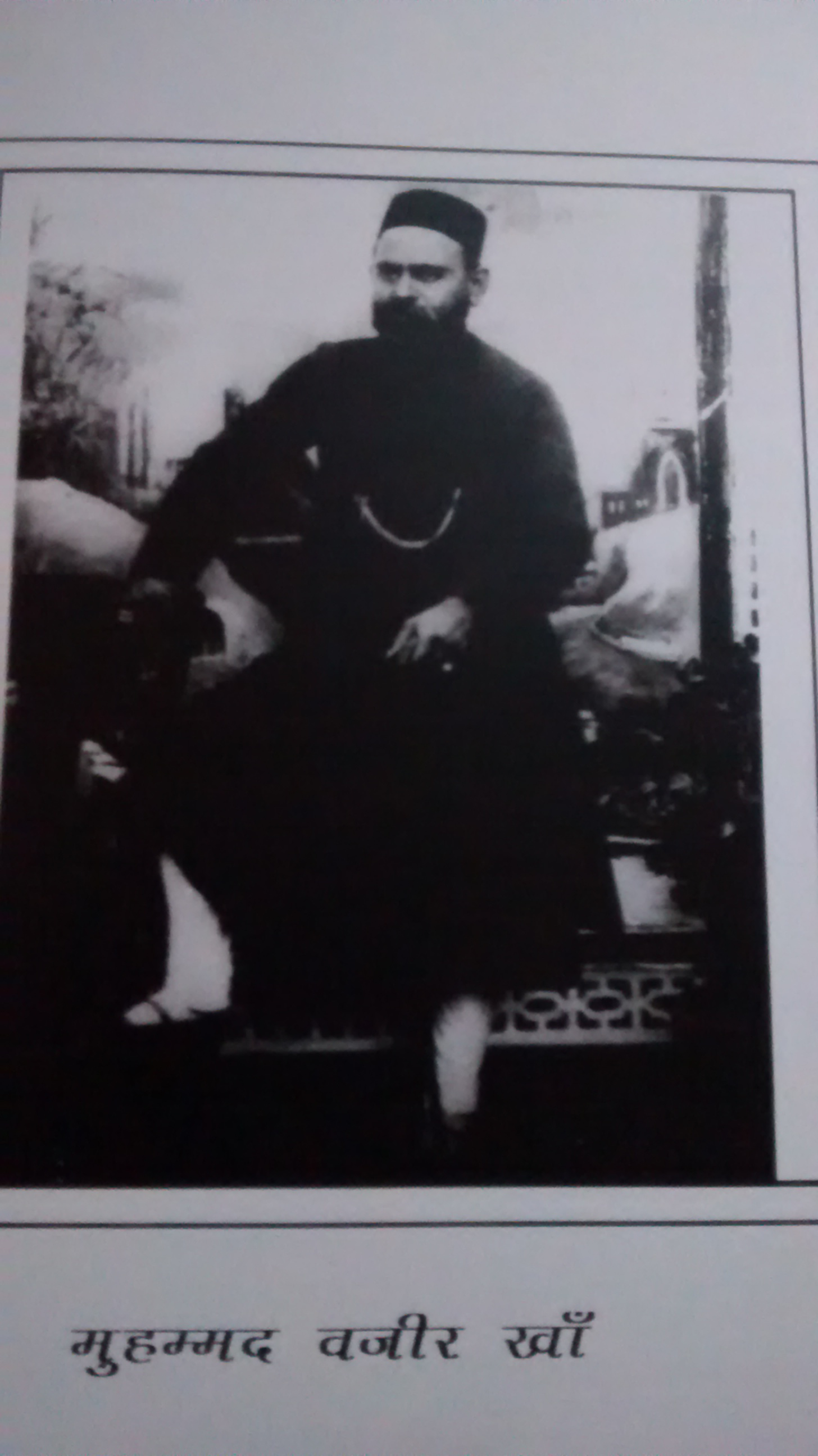
- Born: Mohammad Wazir Khan; 1860; Rampur State
- Died: 1926 (aged 66); Rampur State
- Occupations: Musician; Playwright; Poet; Musicologist
- Writing career
- Pen name: Wazir (Urdu poetry), Gauhar Piya (Hindi poetry)
- Period: 1860 – 1926
- Genres: Hindustani Classical Music; Musical Theatre
- Notable works: Vilayati Chakkar (Urdu Novel); Risala mousibi

Ustad Mohammad Wazir Khan (1860–1926) served as the head of Arbab-e-Nishat (Music Department of Rampur State) during the period of Nawab Hamid Ali Khan of Rampur. He was also an excellent playwright who established the Rampur theatre in the building of club Ghar in Rampur.

== Early life and background ==
Wazir Khan was born in 1860 in the former Rampur State to Ameer Khan Beenkar. He was the descendant of Naubat Khan and Hussaini (Tansen's daughter). Besides music, Wazir Khan's interests spanned many fields and areas. He was also a professional playwright, poet, published author, painter, passionate photographer, and a well-practiced calligrapher. Primarily he used to do calligraphy in Arabic and Persian. In poetry, he was the student of the noted poet Daagh Dehlvi. As a musicologist, he wrote the Risala Mausibi. In addition, Wazir Khan was proficient in many languages, such as Arabic, Persian, Urdu, Hindi, Bangla, Marathi and Gujarati.

== Cuisine ==
All the Naubat Khanis were fond of good food. They were able to develop their own cuisine. Rice preparations were included in their meals and Kabab featured regularly. Rakabdars from the court of Awadh were employed in their kitchens. It was said that if anyone from this family doesn't take dessert after each meal then he is not a Naubat Khani.

The preparation at their kitchens was so rich in ingredients that once Nawab Hamid Ali Khan said that if this family was not fond of such good food, they could have houses made of gold and silver.

== Career ==
Ustad Muhammad Wazir Khan was the master of Nawab Hamid Ali Khan of Rampur, Allauddin Khan, Hafiz Ali Khan, and Vishnu Narayan Bhatkhande. Alauddin Khan went on to establish the modern Maihar Gharana, with disciples such as Ali Akbar Khan (son), Annapurna Devi (daughter), Pandit Ravi Shankar (son-in-law), Nikhil Banerjee, Vasant Rai, Pannalal Ghosh, Bahadur Khan, and Sharan Rani.

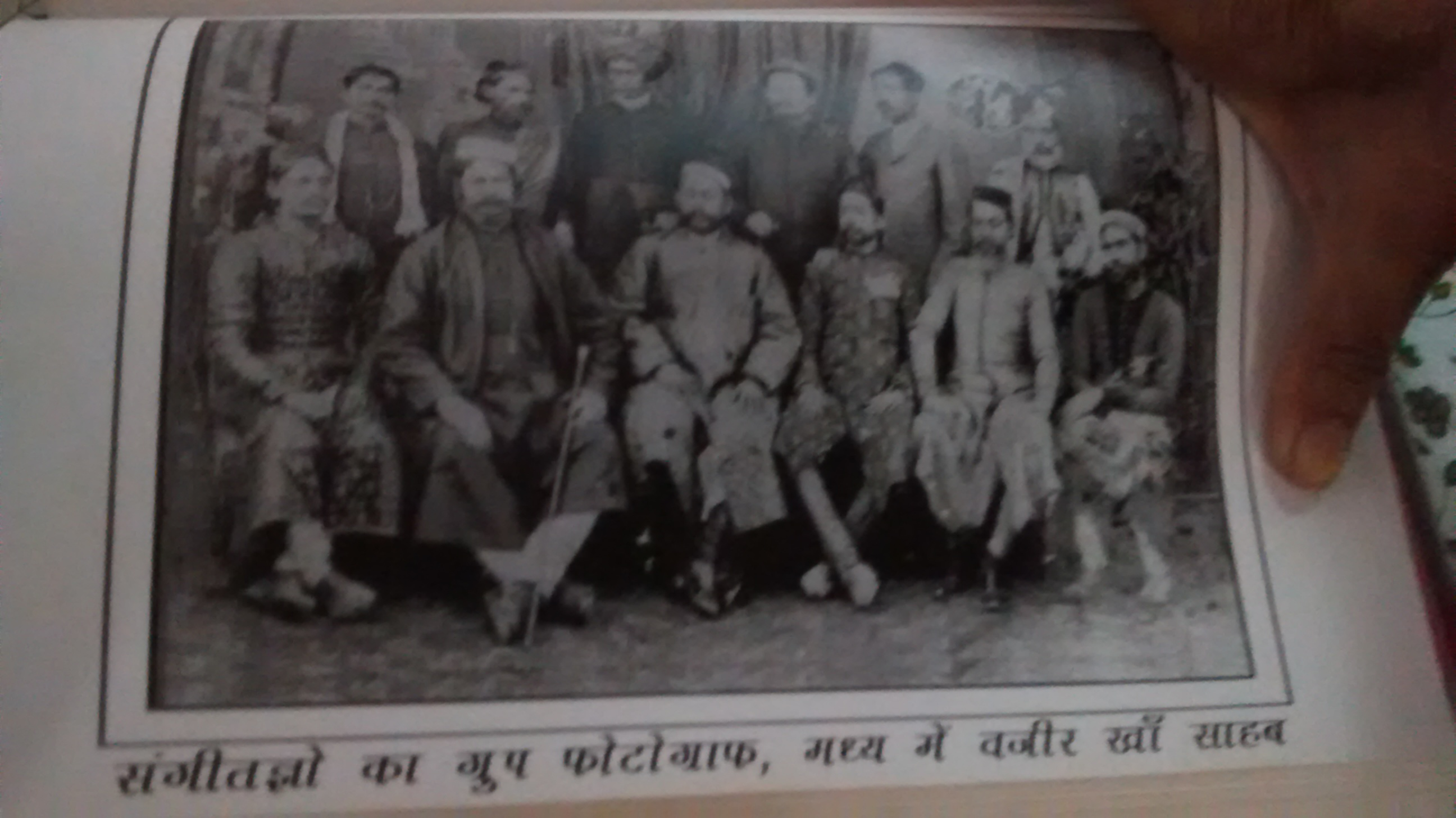
Wazir Khan (centre) with other musicians

== Struggle of Alauddin Khan ==
Wazir Khan lived like a prince and it was not easy for a commoner to approach the musician directly. Alauddin was quite desperate to become his disciple and it is said that one day he threw himself in front of the Nawab's vehicle. The Nawab of Rampur was pleased with Alauddin's perseverance so he sent the vehicle to fetch Wazir Khan and Alauddin was made the disciple of Wazir Khan. Wazir Khan taught Alauddin nothing for two years and only began to teach him when he came to know about the hardships Alauddin's wife was facing at home.

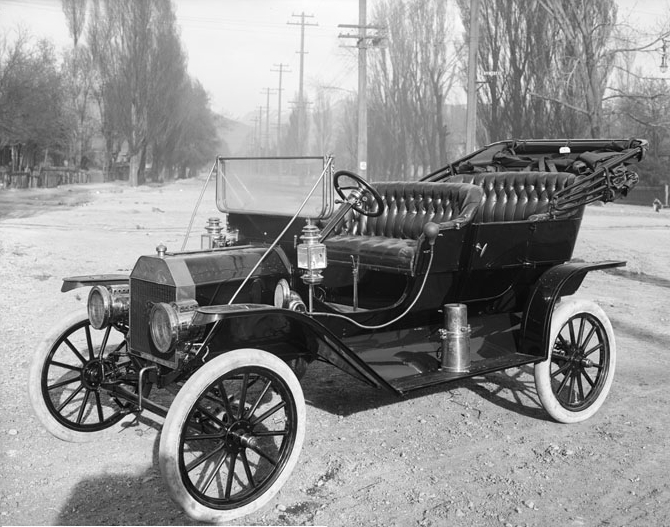
1907 Ford owned by Ustad Wazir Khan, the earliest Ford car in Calcutta

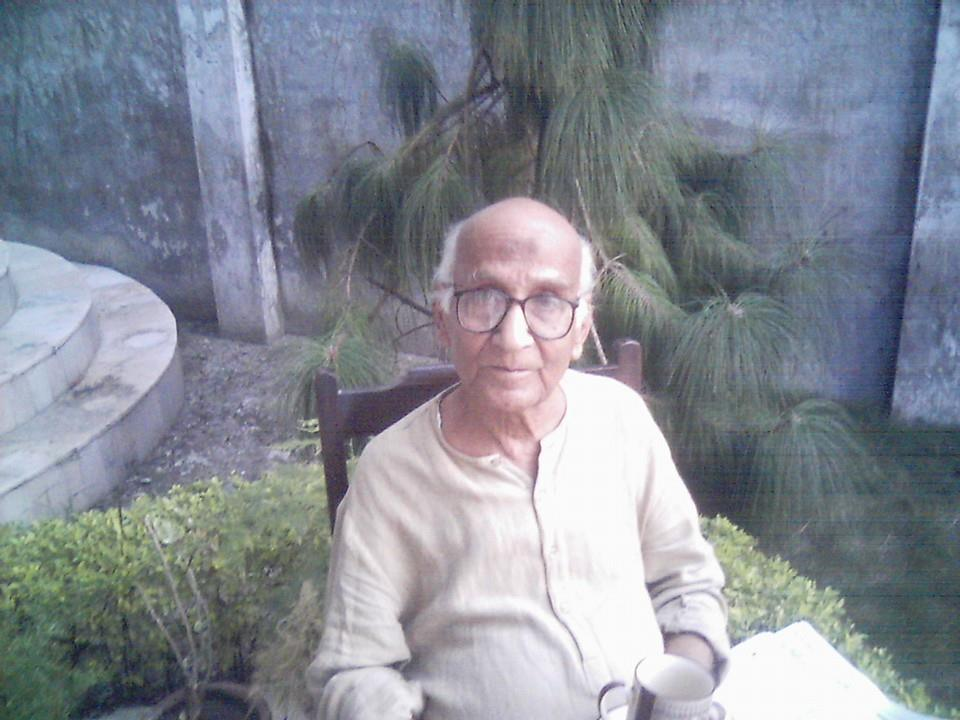
Imtiyaz Ali Khan, nephew of Wazir Khan

== Family tree ==
- I. Samokhan Singh, Raja of Kishangarh. Imperial forces fought with the forces of Mughal Emperor Akbar. Samokhan Singh was killed in battle.
  - II. Jhanjhan Singh, Yuvraj Sahib of Kishangarh. Present in the battle and was killed.
    - III. Misri Singh (Naubat Khan), Yuvraj Sahib of Kishangarh. Put under house arrest. Accepts Islam. Akbar confers title of Khan. Emperor Akbar arranges Naubat Khan's marriage to Saraswati, the daughter of Tansen. Jahangir confers the title of Naubat Khan and promotes him to the rank of 500 personnel and 200 horse.
      - IV. Lal Khan Gunsamundra. Title of Gunsamundra conferred by Shahjahan on 19 November 1637.
        - V. Bisram Khan. One of the chief musicians at the court of Mughal Emperor Shahjahan and Mughal Emperor Aurangzeb
        - VI. Manrang
        - VII. Bhupat Khan
          - IX. Sidhar Khan
        - VIII. Khushal Khan Gunsamundra
          - X. Nirmol Shah
            - XI. Naimat Khan, Sadarang (1670–1748). Developed Khayal, chief musician of Mohammad Shah Rangeela.
            - XII. Naubat Khan II
              - XIII. Feroz Khan, Adarang
              - XIV. Mohammad Ali Khan
              - XV. Omrao Khan
                - XVI. Haji Mohammad Ameer Khan Khandara. Went to perform Haj with Nawab Kalbey Ali Khan
                  - XVII. Wazir Khan (Rampur). (1860–1926). Chief musician at the court of Nawab Hamid Ali Khan of Rampur
                    - XIX. Mohammad Nazeer Khan
                      - XXII. Mohammad Dabir Khan
                        - XXIII. Mohammad Shabbir Khan
                    - XX. Mohammad Naseer Khan
                    - XXI. Mohammad Sagheer Khan
                  - XVIII. Fida Ali Khan
                    - XXIV. Mumtaz Ali Khan
                    - XXV. Imtiyaz Ali Khan
                    - XXVI. Imdad Ali Khan

== See also ==
- Hindustani classical music
- Sadarang
- Tansen
- Naubat Khan
- Kishangarh
