= Ameer Khan Khandara =

19th-century Indian musician

Ameer Khan امیر خان
- Born: Ameer Khan; Banda
- Died: Rampur State
- Occupations: Musician author painter poet
- Writing career
- Notable work: Gulistaan e Musarrat

Ameer Khan Beenkar (fl. 1872) was an illustrious veena player of the eighteenth century. He was also an outstanding dhrupad singer. He along with his uncle and father-in-law Bahadur Hussain Khan established the Rampur musical court during the period of Nawab Yusef Ali Khan and Nawab Kalbey Ali Khan. Ameer Khan went to Haj pilgrimage with Nawab Kalbey Ali Khan in the year 1872. Ameer Khan was also a capable portrait artist. His self-portrait was published in Musaddas Tahniyat-e-Jahsn-e-Benazeer written by Awadh poet and later Rampur courtier Meer Yar Ali Jaan Sahab. Musaddas is currently in Rampur Raza Library. Ameer Khan wrote Gulistaan-e-Musarrat which is also preserved in Rampur Raza library.

== Personal life ==
Ameer Khan was born in Banda to Omrao Khan.He was the father of celebrated vina player Wazir Khan.Ameer Khan died in Rampur and his obituary was published in Akhbaar Dabdaba e Sikandri.

== See also ==
- Sadarang
- Wazir Khan (Rampur)
- Tansen
- Naubat Khan
- Kishangarh
