= Bahadur Hussain Khan =

19th-century Indian musician

Ustad Bahadur Hussain Khan
- Origin: Awadh, India
- Died: Rampur, Uttar Pradesh, India
- Genres: Hindustani classical music; Dhrupad
- Occupations: Musician; Music educator
- Instruments: Been; Veena

Bahadur Hussain Khan was the direct descendant of Miyan Tansen and his son-in-law Naubat Khan. He was the favourite musician of Nawab Wajid Ali Shah. The Nawab conferred on him the title of Zia Ud Daulah.

== Life ==
Bahadur Hussain Khan was invited to Rampur by Nawab Yusef Ali Khan as Awadh was annexed by Britishers. He came to Rampur on 26 April 1857. Nawab Yusef Ali Khan gave him a mansion, a mango orchard, and a palanquin to honor him. He was given a salary of Rs 300 by his employer that was increased to Rs 350 during the period of Nawab Kalbey Ali Khan.

== Career ==
Bahadur Hussain Khan along with his nephew and son-in-law Ameer Khan Beenkar established the Rampur Musical Court. Both of them performed at the Rampur fair at Benazeer palace in Rampur during the reign of Nawab Kalbey Ali Khan. Famous poet of Awadh court Meer Yaar Ali Jaan sahab who joined Rampur court after 1857 gave a detailed sketch of these two musicians in his Musaddas.Jalal Lakhnavi who was one of the most prominent poet of the Awadh court and after 1857 joined the Rampur court waxed eloquent about Bahadur Hussain Khan and Ameer Khan Beenkar in his poetry.These details were published by Rampur Raza Library.

== Disciples ==
Bahadur Hussain Khan taught music to Nawab Yusef Ali Khan and Nawab Kalbey Ali Khan.

A portrait of Bahadur Hussain Khan was published in Musaddas Tahniyaat e Jashn e Benazeer, written by Meer Yaar Ali Jaan Sahab.

== Death ==
Bahadur Hussain Khan died childless in Rampur. His obituary was published in Akhbaar Dabdaba e Sikandri. His maternal niece married his paternal nephew Ameer Khan Beenkar. The mango orchard of Bahadur Hussain Khan was later given to his grandson Ustad Wazir Khan by Nawab Hamid Ali Khan of Rampur.
