= Imtiyaz Ali Khan =

Indian Marxist thinker (1928–2018)

Imtiyaz Ali Khan Khandara
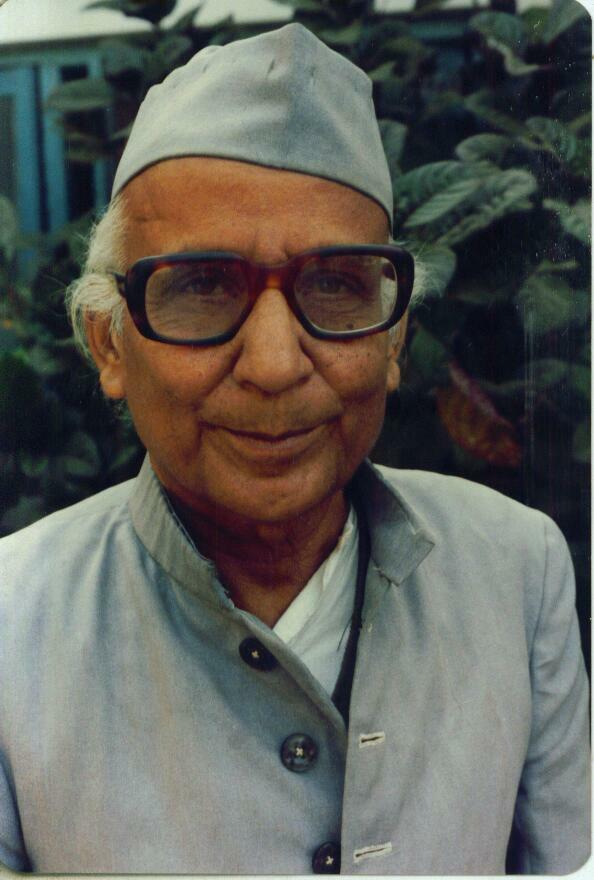
- Born: Rampur, India
- Occupations: Painter; art historian; Marxist

Imtiyaz Ali Khan Khandara (1928–2018) was a painter, Marxist thinker, and art historian.

== Life ==
Famously known as Master Sahab, Khan was born in Rampur, British India in 1928. He was one of the three sons of Fida Ali Khan. Fida Ali Khan was employed as a Tahseeldar in the erstwhile princely state of Rampur.Imtiyaz Ali Khan's paternal uncle was the legendary Vina player Ustad Muhammad Wazir Khan.

== Cuisine ==
All the Naubat Khanis were fond of good food. They were able to develop their own cuisine. Rice preparations were included in their meals and Kabab featured regularly. Rakabdars from the court of Awadh were employed in their kitchens.

Naseeruddin was a Rakabdar who was employed at the house of Imtiyaz Ali Khan. He was addressed as Peerji as he shared his name with Chiragh Dilli. This family had great respect for the Sufi saint. Peerji was an expert kababiya and he came from Awadh. His father was employed with the Nawab of Rampur.

It was said that if anyone from this family doesn't take Dessert after each meal than he is not a Naubat Khani.

The preparation at their kitchens were so rich in Ingredients that once Nawab Hamid Ali Khan said that if this family was not fond of such good food they could have houses made of Gold and silver.

== Writings ==
Imtiyaz Ali Khan has been the editor of Musaddas Tahniyat-e- Jashn-i-Benazeer. He has also done extensive work on Mughal Miniatures.

== Political career ==
Imtiyaz Ali Khan was associated with the Communist Party of India.

== See also ==
- Wazir Khan (Rampur)
- Sadarang
- Tansen
- Naubat Khan
- Kishangarh
