= Khushal Khan Gunsamundra =

Khushal Khan was a vocalist and instrumentalist in the Mughal court. He was the foremost luminary of the durbar of the Mughal emperor Aurangzeb.

== Career ==
He was trained in alap and dhrupad by his father Lal Khan "Gunsamundra." Khushhal Khan was one of the most feted Mughal court musicians of his time. Chief musician to the Mughal emperors Shah Jahan (r. 1627–58) and Aurangzeb ‘Alamgir (r. 1658–1707), he was written about extensively in his lifetime as a virtuoso classical singer of exceptional merit and serious character. He was the teacher of Mughal Emperor Aurangzeb in classical music. In 1658, Mughal Emperor Aurangzeb bestowed a gift of a She-elephant to Khushhal Khan. In February 1659, after the victory in Battle of Khajwa, Aurangzeb bestowed gifts on Khushhal Khan.

== Depiction ==
A portrait of him, dressed in pink with other renowned court musicians at the wedding of Dara Shukoh in 1633, may be found in the Royal Collection Trust.

== See also ==
- Hindustani classical music
- Sadarang
- Tansen
- Wazir Khan (Rampur)
- Kishangarh
