= Gunsamundra =

Musician in the court of a Mughal emperor

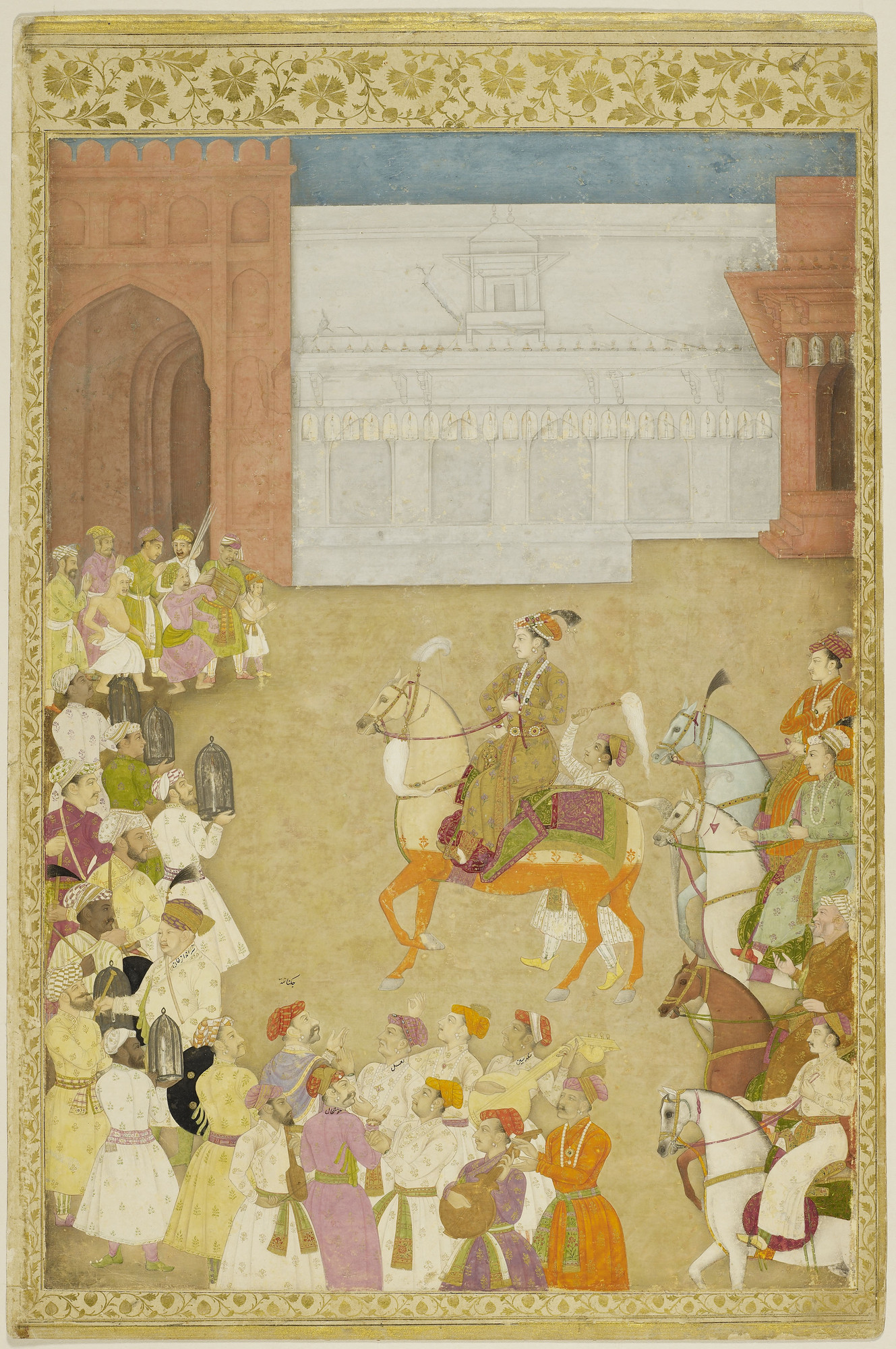
Gunsamundra (in white) and his son Khushal Khan (in pink) can be seen at the wedding procession of Dara Shikoh. Names are inscribed. Royal Collection Trust, London.

Lal Khan was a musician in the court of the Mughal emperor Shah Jahan, who conferred the title of Gunsamundra on him on 19 November 1637.

== Career ==
The most venerated musician of the time, who had imperium over all the rest of the court, was Lal Khan Gunsamundra. In Badshahnama Lal Khan is invariably mentioned. As a great musician of court he was frequently rewarded by the emperor. In 1642, to mark the second year of coronation of Mughal Emperor Shahjahan, the emperor gave an elephant to Lal Khan after listening to him. On the occasion of the New Year festivities in 1645-46, Lal Khan was one of the recipients of appropriate rewards. In the 10th year of the accession Shahjahan gave Lal Khan a cash award of 4000 in 1645, and 6 months later gave 1000 cash award.Lal Khan also composed songs in the name of the Emperor.

== Divine healing touch ==
After returning from Taj Mughal Emperor Shahjahan laid on his bed for the whole day partly conscious. As the night fell the pain increased and the hakeem had to be sent for. Shahjahan said Tansen's grandson Lal Khan Gunsamundra should be called and asked to sing. Whenever his pain used to become unsufferable, Shahjahan liked to listen to Dhrupad.Physician was worried about the health of the Emperor. Shahjahan said that it was pain which had clotted. The singer came and listening to the melody, Shahjahan at last fell asleep.

== Personal life ==
Lal Khan was the son of celebrated vina player Naubat Khan and the son-in-law of Tansen's son Bilas Khan.He was the father of Khushal Khan Gunsamundra. Lal Khan died at the age of 90 years.

== See also ==
- Hindustani classical music
- Sadarang
- Tansen
- Wazir Khan (Rampur)
- Kishangarh
