= Omrao Khan =

18th-century Indian musician

- Born: Agra, Mughal Empire (India)
- Years active: 18th century
- Relatives: Naubat Khan
- Musical career
- Instruments: Rudra veena; surbahar

Omrao Khan was a veena wizard, of the 18th century. He was a descendant of Naubat Khan.

== Early life ==
Omrao Khan was born in Agra to Naubat Khan II. He was the nephew of Nirmol Shah and first cousin of Pyar Khan, Jafar Khan and Basit Khan, of Awadh. He came to Banda on the invitation of Nawab of Banda. Omrao Khan had two sons Ameer Khan beenkar and Rahim Khan. Ameer Khan was the father of legendary vina player Ustad Muhammad Wazir Khan.

== Career ==
The court of Maharaja Udit Narayan Singh of Banaras was home to one of the foremost bīn-playing lines of the time. Topmost among the musicians of banaras, and first among all contemporary musicians named by Karam Imam, was Omrao Khan. Khan was the master of Ali Bahadur II ("Hashmat Jung"), the nawab of Banda from 1850 to 1858, who participated in the first war of Independence in 1857. Ali Naqi, the prime minister of Awadh, and Raja sahab Rewa also learned music under his instruction.

== Surbahar ==
Omrao Khan invented the surbahar, a plucked string instrument akin to a "bass sitar", and taught it to his disciple Ghulam Mohammad at Banda.

== See also ==
- Sadarang
- Tansen
- Naubat Khan
