= Dabir Khan =

20th century beenkar and vocalist from India

- Born: 1905; Rampur State
- Died: 1972 (aged 66–67)
- Occupations: Vocal and instrumental musician of Hindustani classical music
- Awards: Sangeet Natak Akademi Award by the Government of India in 1969

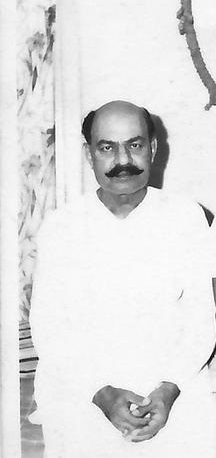
Dabir Khan

Dabir Khan was a 20th-century 'beenkar' and a vocalist. He was the grandson of legendary vina player Wazir Khan.

== Career ==
Dabir Khan learned veena from his grandfather, Wazir Khan. He was employed at All India Radio Calcutta. Dabir Khan is also considered as one of India's legendary musician Miyan Tansen's last descendants and in 1969 was awarded a Sangeet Natak Akademi Award. Among the pupils of Dabir Khan were K. C. Dey, the noted singer Manna Dey, Asit De (head of the Theory Division of the Saha Institute of Nuclear Physics, Kolkata), and Pandit Santosh Banerjee (formerly head of department of instrumental music, Rabindra Bharati University, Calcutta).

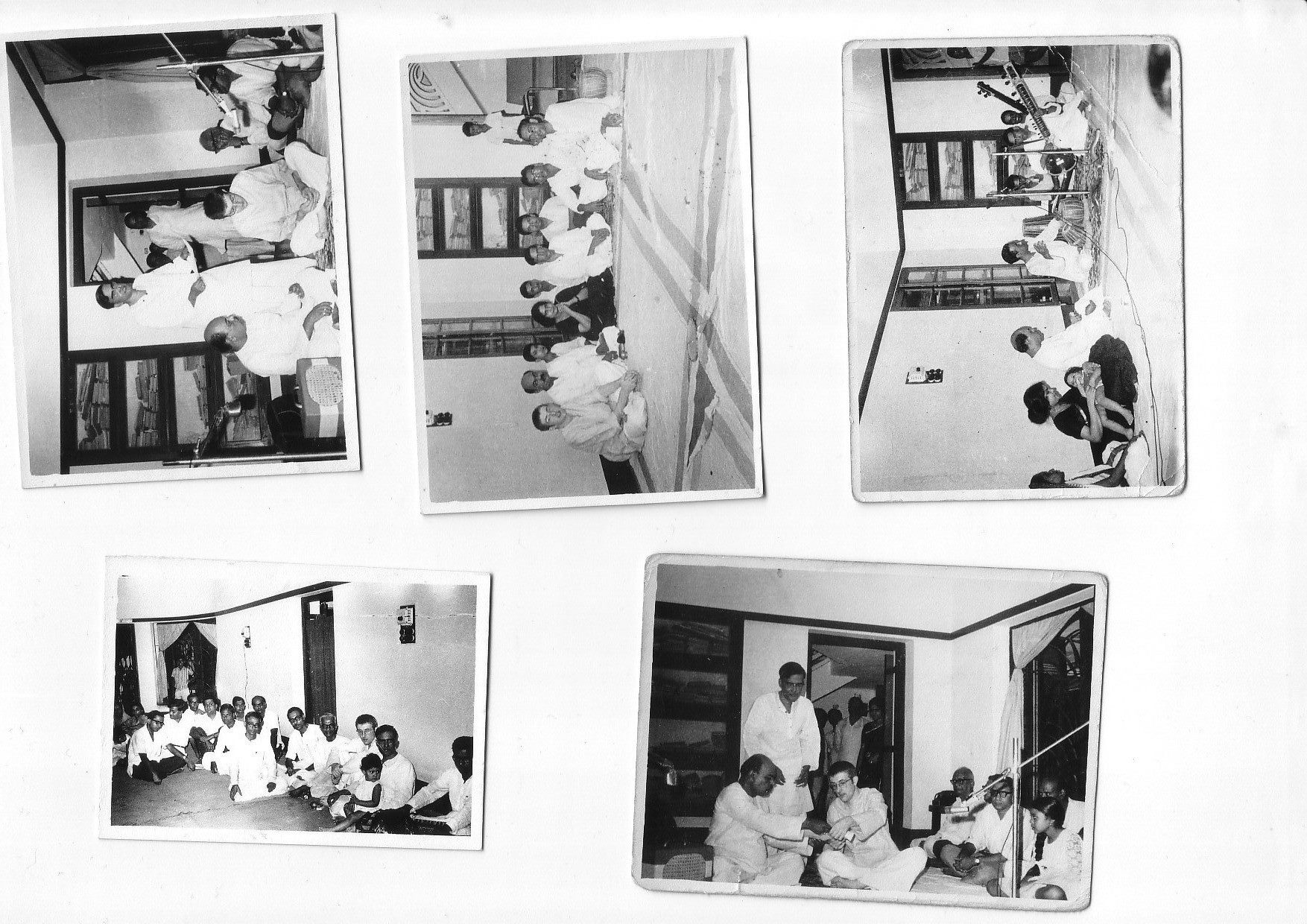
Dabir Khan as external examiner to Clem Alford at Midnapore, West Bengal in 1969

Clem Alford was a student of Pandit S.N. Saha, who was himself a student of Ustad Muhammad Dabir Khan. Muhammad Dabir Khan was the external examiner of Clem Alford in 1969 at Midnapore Music College.

== Personal life ==
Dabir Khan was born in Rampur State in 1905. He died in 1972.

== Awards and recognition ==
- Sangeet Natak Akademi Award by the Government of India in 1969

== See also ==
- Hindustani classical music
- Sadarang
- Tansen
