= Imtiaz =

Imtiaz or Imtiyaz (امتياز) is a given name of Arabic origin, which means "distinct" or "unique". It may refer to:

- Imtiaz Abbasi (born 1968), Emirati cricketer
- Imtiyaz Ahmed (born 1985), Indian cricketer
- Imtiaz Alam Hanfi (1929–2015), Pakistani banker
- Imtiaz Ali (cricketer) (born 1954), West Indian cricketer
- Imtiaz Ali (director) (born 1971), Indian film director
- Imtiyaz Ali Khan (1926–2018), Indian painter and art historian
- Imtiaz Ali Taj (1900–1970), Pakistani writer
- Imtiaz Bhatti (1933–2024), Pakistani cyclist and Air Force pilot and officer
- Imtiaz Dharker (born 1954), British poet and filmmaker
- Imtiaz Gilani (born 1947), Pakistani civil engineer
- Imtiaz Hossain (born 1985), Bangladeshi cricketer
- Imtiaz Khan (1942–2020), Indian actor
- Imtiaz Safdar Warraich (born 1952), Pakistani politician
- Imtiaz (retail chain), Pakistani supermarket chain
