= Samokhan Singh =

Ruler of Kishangarh

Raja Samokhan Singh was the ruler of the city and principality of Kishangarh in present-day Rajasthan. He was a scion of the Rathore clan of Rajputs.

== Capture of Kishangarh ==
Raja Samokhan Singh was the greatest Vina player of his time. The Mughal Emperor Akbar managed to get Miyan Tansen to his court, but he wanted an instrumentalist for his durbar. He conferred with Tansen on this matter. Tansen told him that he could get as many players as he wanted but there is only one master that is Raja Samokhan Singh of Kishangarh. Akbar sent a letter to Samokhan Singh and expressed his desire. Samokhan Singh knew the political desires of Akbar, he refused by saying that he used to play Vina for God. Akbar never expected such an answer, he got furious and asked the Faujdar of Ajmer to get Samokhan Singh to terms. Heavy fight ensued at Kishangarh and rajputs fought bravely. But the Mughals were superior in numbers hence Raja Samokhan Singh and his son Jhanjhan Singh were killed in the battle. His grandson, Mishri Singh who would be known as Naubat Khan later in his life was captured and put under house arrest.

== Khanda ==
The family weapon of Samokhan Singh's family was Khanda after which the bani of dhrupad is named i.e Khandar bani. This family was also called as Khandara Beenkar after their family weapon Khanda.

== Fort ==
The ruins of the fort of Samokhan Singh is present in Kishangarh, Rajasthan.

== Portrait ==
A portrait of Raja Samokhan Singh was published in a Magazine depicting Samokhan Singh with his staff crossing a river in a boat.

== See also ==
- Marwar
- Kishangarh
- Hindustani classical music
- Naubat Khan
- Sadarang
- Tansen
- Wazir Khan (Rampur)
