= Hafiz Ali Khan =

Haafiz Ali Khan
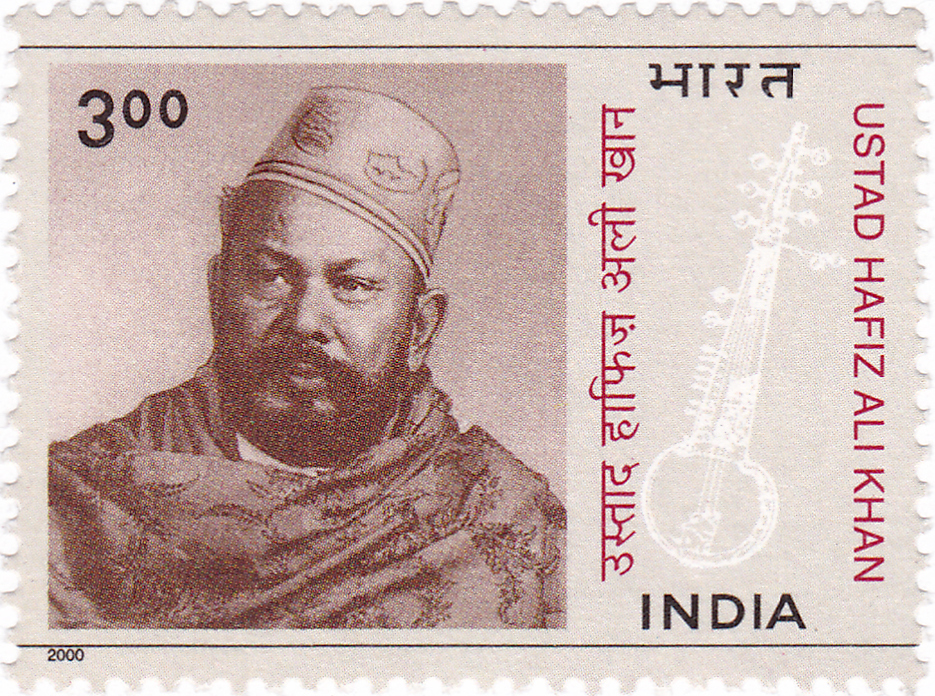
- Hafiz Ali Khan on a 2000 stamp of India

Background information
- Born: 1888; Gwalior, Madhya Pradesh
- Died: 1972 (aged 84) Mumbai, Maharashtra, India
- Genre: Hindustani classical music
- Occupations: Composer, Sarod player
- Instrument: Sarod

Hafiz Ali Khan (1888 – December 1972) was an Indian sarod player.

A fifth-generation descendant of the Bangash (Gwalior Gharana) (Gwalior Music School) of sarod players, Hafiz Ali was known for the lyrical beauty of his music and the crystal-clear tone of his strokes on the sarod instrument. The occasional critic has, however, observed that Khan's imagination was often closer to the semi-classical thumri idiom than the austere dhrupad style prevalent at the time. He was a recipient of the civilian honour, the Padma Bhushan, in 1960.

== Early life and background ==
A son of the sarod player Nanneh Khan, Hafiz Ali grew up in a community of sarod players, and it is likely that he studied with his father and a number of his proximate disciples. He later took lessons from his cousin Abdulla Khan, nephew Mohammad Amir Khan, and finally the beenkar Wazir Khan of Rampur. Wazir Khan was supposedly a direct descendant of the legendary Tansen, through the lineage of the latter's daughter. Notably, Allauddin Khan of Maihar was also a pupil of Wazir Khan in Rampur in the same period. It is said that Hafiz Ali later studied dhrupad and thumri with Ganeshilal Chaubey in Mathura and Bhaiya Ganpatrao, respectively.

== Performing career ==
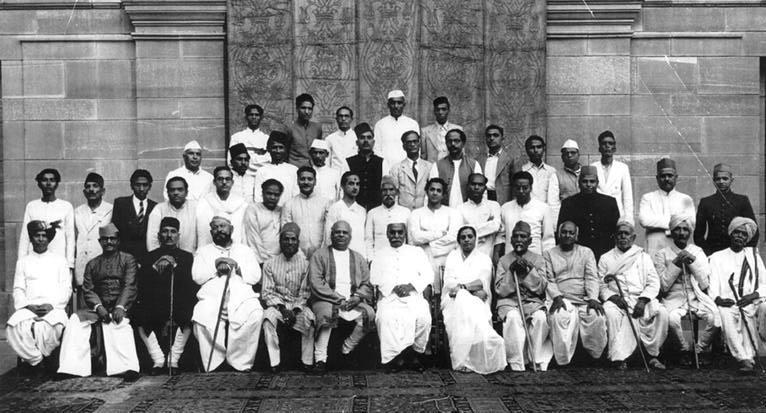
Hafiz Ali Khan (front row 4th from left) amongst noted Indian musicians at the first Music conference after India's independence, 1948

Hafiz Ali's regal appearance and electrifying charisma made him one of the most sought-after musicians of his time, which was no mean feat for an instrumentalist in an era largely dominated by vocal music. Old-timers who have seen him in concert recall his stage presence and musicianship with reverence and awe. While still a court musician in Gwalior, he would undertake numerous trips to Bengal, where he performed at major music festivals, and taught a number of disciples. Khan's music found generous patrons in two Bengali aristocrats, Raychand Boral and Manmatha Ghosh, both of whom studied with him at various points. Haafiz Ali Khan was also appreciated in the Viceregal firmament of colonial India for his unique, stylized renditions of "God Save The King" on his sarod.

== Legacy ==
Hafiz Ali died in 1972, at the age of 84 in New Delhi. A road in his name was inaugurated by the Chief Minister, Smt. Sheila Dikshit on 10 February at PWD Road. This is the 2nd entry road to Nizamuddin Railway Station. This is the only road named after an artist after Tansen and Thyagaraja in the capital city. This road is about 300 metres long.

== See also ==
- Vasant Rai
- Allauddin Khan
- Bahadur Khan
- Radhika Mohan Maitra
- Amjad Ali Khan
- Buddhadev Das Gupta
- Ali Akbar Khan
