= Adarang =

Indian musical composer and artist

Firoz Khan, who used the pen name Adarang, was a Hindustani musical composer and artist.

== Career ==
Mughal Emperor Muhammad Shah patronized Adarang, who revolutionized Hindustani classical music through propagation of Khayal with Sadarang. In the context of Sitar the mention of Adarang deserves attention. Firoz Khan, Adarang, was one of the chief musicians in the royal court and is considered as the first musician who introduced sitar in the 18th century through the Delhi court. Nawab Dargah Quli Khan's description of his mehfils in Muraqqa-e-Dehli is taken as the earliest mention yet found of Sitar in Northern India. Later Sadullah Khan the son of Ali Mohammed Khan used to invite Adarang to Aonla for musical conferences.

== Personal life ==
Adarang was the nephew and son-in-law of Sadarang. He was the son of Naubat Khan II. Adarang was the descendant of Naubat Khan and Hussaini (Tansen's daughter).
