= Kishan Singh of Kishangarh =

Founder and Maharaja of Kishangarh State (1583–1615)

Raja Kishan Singh
- Raja of Kishangarh; Rajkumar of Marwar
- Reign: c. 1611 – May 1615
- Successor: Raja Sahasmal
- Born: Krishan Singh; 28 April 1575; Jodhpur, Marwar Kingdom, Rajputana
- Died: May, 1615; Ajmer, Ajmer Subah, Mughal Empire
- Spouse: Bhatiyaniji Sujan Deiji d.of Kunwar Dayaldas son of Yuvraj Khet Singh of Jaisalmer Sisodiniji Phool Deiji Hadiji Roop Deiji of Bundi
- Issue: Sahas Mal Jag Mal Bhar Mal Hari Singh
Names
- Raja Kishan Singh Rathore
- House: Rathore
- Father: Raja Udai Singh Rathore
- Mother: Kachwahiji (Rajawatji) Manrang Deiji d.of Raja Askaran of Amber later Gwalior
- Religion: Hinduism

Raja Kishan Singh (28 April 1575 – May 1615) was the first Rathore Rajput ruler of Kishangarh and younger son of Mota Raja Udai Singh of Marwar Kingdom and the founder of Kishangarh and the eponymous Kishangarh State.

== Family ==
Born on 28 April 1575 as Kunwar Krishan Singh,he was one of the younger sons of Raja Udai Singh ruler of Marwar. His mother was Rajawatji (Kachwahiji) Manrang Deiji the tenth and the principal consort of his father and the daughter of Raja Askaran of Narwar, who was also briefly Raja of Amber before being ousted in favour of his uncle, Bharmal. He was also the younger full-brother of Sur Singh, ruler of Marwar and Mani Bai, wife of Jahangir and mother of Shah Jahan.

== Under Imperial Service ==
Kishan Singh was sent to Mughal service at a very young age. In 1594, he was confirmed by Akbar, the grant of a territory southeast-ward of Jodhpur.

In 1607, he was granted a mansab of 1000 Zat and 500 Sawar by Jahangir.

In 1608, he assisted Mahabat Khan against the Rana of Mewar and had been wounded on the leg by a spear. For his laudable service, Jahangir raised his rank to 2000 Zat and 1000 Sawar. He was also granted the jagir of Setholav.

In 1609, he founded the town of Kishangarh on the site of Setholav.

In 1612, he was granted the title of "Maharaja" by Jahangir. In March 1615, his mansab was raised to 3000 Zat and 1500 Sawar.

== Death ==
Kishan Singh died in May 1615 near Ajmer. The incident is described by Jahangir as follows:

On the night of Friday, the 15th, a strange affair occurred. By chance on that night I was at Pushkar. To be brief, Kishan, own brother to Rāja Sūraj Singh, was in great perturbation through Gobind Dās, the Vakil of the said Raja having some time ago killed his nephew, a youth of the name of Gopāl Dās. The cause of the quarrel it would take too long to tell. Kishan Singh expected that, as Gopāl Dās was also the nephew of the Raja (Sūraj Singh), the latter would kill Gobind Dās. But the Raja, on account of the experience and ability of Gobind Dās, relinquished the idea of seeking revenge for his nephew's death. When Kishan saw this neglect on the part of the Raja, he resolved himself to take revenge for his nephew, and not allow his blood to pass away unnoticed. For a long time he kept this matter in his mind, until on that night he assembled his brothers, friends, and servants, and told them that he would go that night to take Gobind Dās's life, whatever might happen, and that he did not care what injury might happen to the Raja. The Raja was in ignorance of what was happening, and when it was near dawn Kishan came with Karan, his brother's son, and other companions. When he arrived at the gate of the Raja's dwelling he sent some of the experienced men on foot to the house of Gobind Dās, which was near the Raja's. He himself (Kishan) was on horseback, and stationed himself near the gate. The men on foot entered Gobind Dās's house, and killed some of those who were there on guard. Whilst this fight was going on Gobind Dās awoke, and seizing his sword in a state of bewilderment was coming out from one side of the house to join the outside watchmen. When the men on foot had finished killing some of the people, they came out of the tent to endeavour to find out Gobind Dās, and, meeting him, they finished his affair (killed him). Before the news of the killing of Gobind Dās reached Kishan, he, unable to bear it any more, dismounted and came inside the dwelling. Although his men protested in a disturbed state that it was not right to be on foot, he would in no way listen to them. If he had remained a little longer and the news of his enemy having been killed had reached him, it is possible that he would have escaped safe and sound, mounted as he was. As the pen of destiny had gone forth after another fashion, as soon as he alighted and went in, the Raja, who was in his maḥall (female apartment), awoke at the uproar among the people, and stood at the gate of his house with his sword drawn. People from all sides were aroused and came in against the men who were on foot. They saw what the number of men on foot was, and came out in great numbers and faced Kishan Singh's men, who were about ten in number. In short, Kishan Singh and his nephew Karan, when they reached the Raja's house, were attacked by these men and both of them killed. Kishan Singh had seven and Karan nine wounds. Altogether in this fight 66 men on the two sides were killed, on the Raja's side 30 and on Kishan Singh's 36. When the sun rose and illumined the world with its light, this business was revealed, and the Raja saw that his brother, his nephew, and some of his servants, whom he considered dearer than himself, were killed, and the whole of the rest had dispersed to their own places. The news reached me in Pushkar, and I ordered them to burn those who were killed, according to their rites, and inform me of the true circumstances of the affair. In the end it became clear that the affair had happened in the manner in which it has been written here, and that no further enquiry was necessary.

He was succeeded by his son Sahas Mal.

== Ancestry ==
Ancestors of Kishan Singh of Kishangarh

8. Ganga, Rao of Marwar
4. Maldeo, Rao of Marwar
9. Padma Bai of Sirohi
2. Udai Singh, Raja of Marwar
10. Jaito Sajavat Of Khairawa
5. Swarup Devi
1. Kishan Singh
12. Bhim Singh, Raja of Amber
6. Askaran, Raja of Narwar
3. Manrang Devi
