= Bisram Khan =

Bisram Khan was the son of Lal Khan, serving both the Mughal Emperor Shah Jahan and the Mughal Emperor Aurangzeb as one of the chief musicians of the Mughal Court. He was regarded as an excellent dhrupad singer. In November 1658, Aurangzeb bestowed on him the gift of an elephant.

== See also ==
- Hindustani classical music
