= Udai Singh of Marwar =

Mahraja of Marwar from 1583 to 1595

Udai Singh
- Maharaja
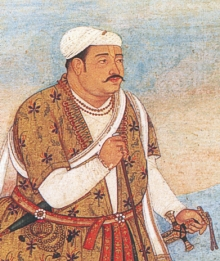

Maharaja of Marwar
- Tenure: 4 August 1583 – 10 July 1595
- Coronation: 4 August 1583
- Predecessor: Chandrasen Rathore
- Successor: Sur Singh
- Born: 13 January 1538; Jodhpur, Marwar (modern-day Rajasthan, India)
- Died: 10 July 1595 (aged 57); Lahore, Lahore Subah, Mughal Empire (modern-day Punjab, Pakistan)
- Consort: Rani Rajavat Kachwahi Manrang Deviji
- Wives: among others; Rani Solanki Nachrang Deviji; Rani Chauhan Ajayab Deviji; Rani Bhatiyani Santokh Deviji; Rani Sisodia Apurva Deviji; Rani Bhatiyani Jasvant Deviji; Rani Cavri Sigar Deviji
- Issue among others: Dameti Bai; Sakat Singh; Dalpat Singh (Ancestor of Ratlam Royal Family); Satyabhama Bai; Suraj Mal; Manavati Bai; Pranmati Bai; Kishan Chand(Founded Kishangarh State)
Names
- Raja Udai Singh Rathore Ji Bahadur Sahab
- House: Rathore
- Father: Maldeo Rathore
- Mother: Swarup Devi of Khairawa
- Religion: Hinduism

Udai Singh (Udai Singh Rathore; 13 January 1538 – 10 July 1595) was the Rathore ruler (r. 1583 – 95) of Marwar, which was later known as Jodhpur (in the present-day Rajasthan state of India). He was also the maternal grandfather of Shah Jahan, the fifth Mughal Emperor, and an ancestor of all subsequent emperors.

== Early life ==
Udai Singh was the son of Maldeo Rathore, Raja of Marwar and Rani Swarup Deviji. He was also elder and only full-brother of Chandrasen, successor of Maldeo.

When Rao Maldeo nominated his younger brother, Chandrasen to the throne, Udai Singh raised some turmoil. In order to pacify him, his mother had Maldeo to give him Phalodi.

== War of succession ==
On the death of Rao Maldeo, his younger brother Chandrasen ascended the throne of Marwar.

Although Marwar did not follow the law of Primogeniture, rarely had the right of the elder son been set aside. Thus the fratricidal war of succession when ensured.

On the instigation of the Chiefs and Nobles of Chandrasen, Udai Singh revolted at Gagani. At the same time Ramchandra and Raimal also revolted at Sajot and Dunda respectively. However both fled away rather than facing Chandrasen's army. But Udai Singh fought Chandrasen's army and was defeated in Lohawat in December 1562. In this battle, both sides suffered great loses in men and material. Udai Singh had given a blow with an axe to Chandrasen and he also received a blow from Rawal Megh Raj. His life was saved by Hade Khichi who had him remove from the battlefield on his horse.

These war unfortunately weakened the Rathore principality when Akbar was forming friendly alliance with other Rajput Chieftains. Thus Marwar soon fell under Mughal Forces. Chandrasen had no allies and all of his brothers and fellow rajput chieftains (apart from Mewar) stood against him. Chandrasen was left completely isolated in the war with the Mughal empire. Akbar's army occupied Merta in the same year and the capital in 1564.

== Under Imperial Service ==
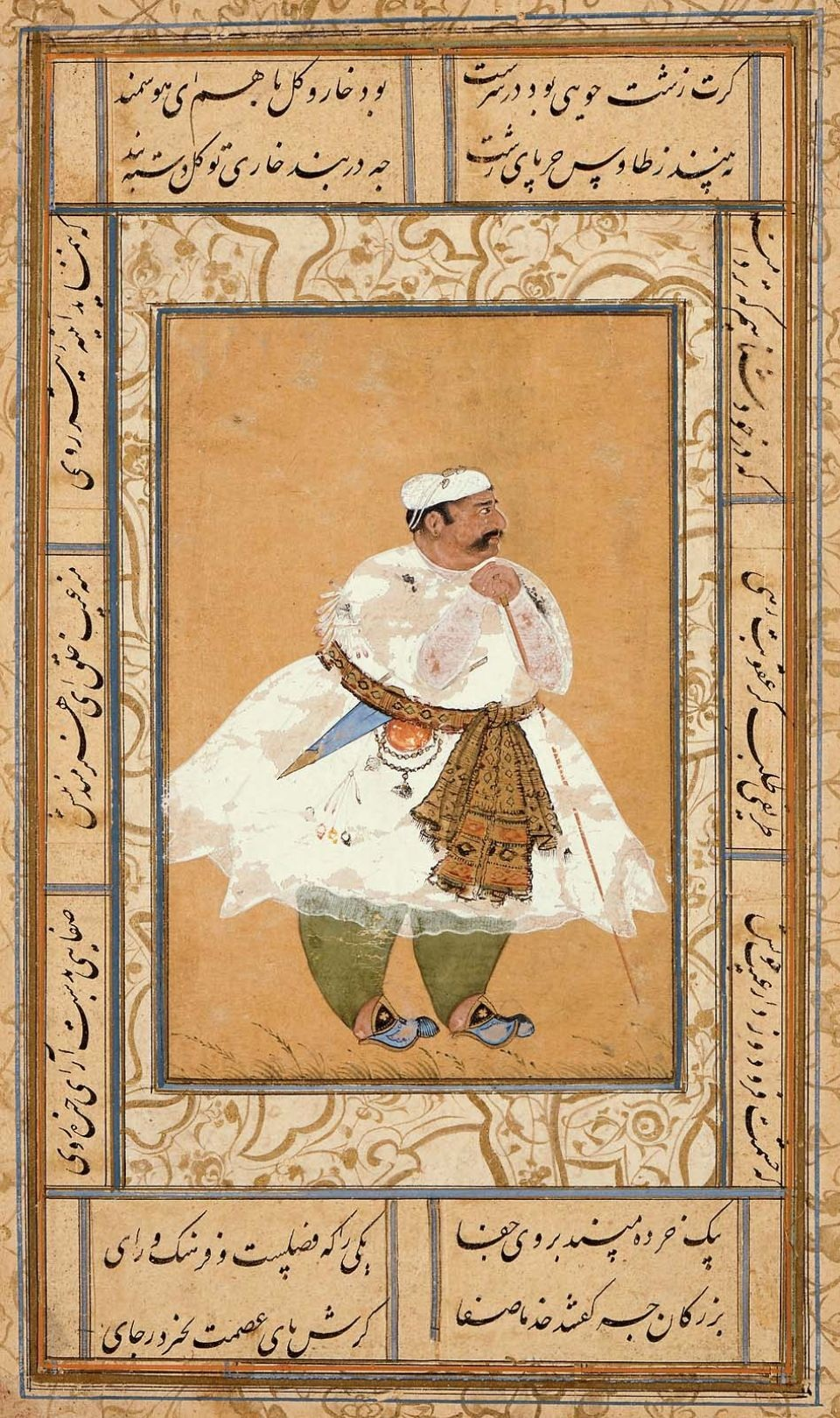
Mota Raja Udai Singh, ca 1580

In November 1570, Udai Singh had come from Phalodi to attend the Mughal Court in Nagore. This court was also attended by Chandrasen. It seems as though both Udai Singh and Chandrasen came with the intention of getting Jodhpur back. But Chandrasen left the court soon after his arrival. In this court, Udai Singh was granted a mansab of 800 along with Samavalli and joined the services of the Mughal. Thereafter, he got an opportunity to prove his worth as a warrior and commander in expeditions against Gujars of Samavalli and Raja Madhukar Bundela.

In 1574, Udai Singh lost Phalodi when Akbar granted it to Bhakharsi, son of Rawal Harraj.

After Chandrasens's death in 1581, the Marwar kingdom was broken and given to several Rajput chieftains who had helped Mughals against Chandrasen. The Raja of Bikaner was made the governor of Marwar, while the sons of Maldeo were cast aside.

== Reign ==
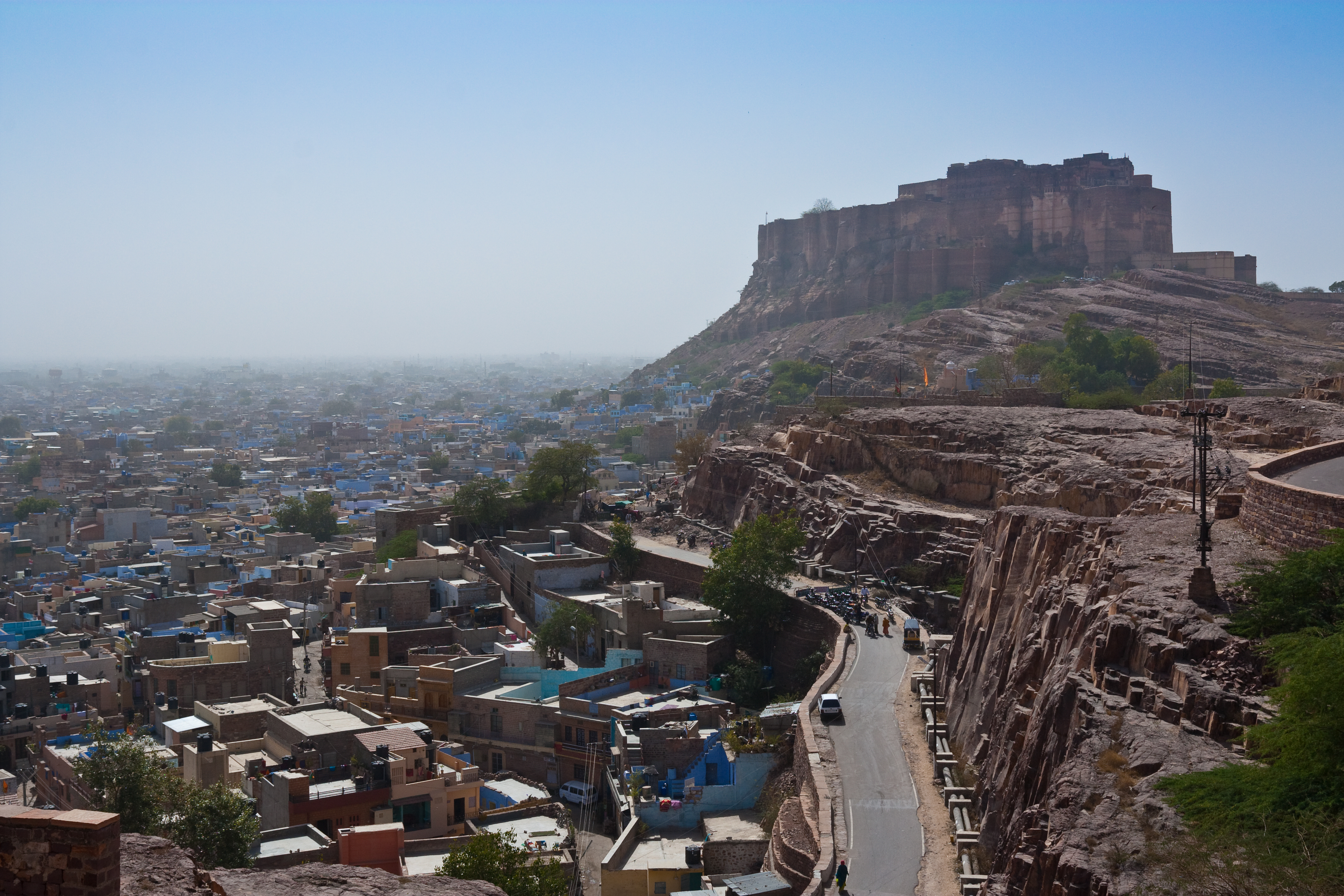
City of Jodhpur

In August 1583, Akbar granted the sinhasan of Jodhpur to Udai Singh.

Soon he was sent in expedition against Muzaffer Khan of Gujarat and Gujarat was annexed to Mughal Empire. Thereafter forces led by Udai Singh and others proceeded to subdue the rebellious vassal Daulat Khan Lodi. He was sent in various expedition against rulers of Rajasthan and rebel Mughal chieftains. Udai Singh, with the help of Mughal Emperor, had finally succeeded to achieve his two decade old ambition of recovering the land of his ancestors.

Udai Singh decided to give his daughter Mani bai, popularly known as Jodh bai, born to his principal queen Manrang devi, to the heir-apparent of Mughal Empire, Prince Salim. The marriage got solemnised at the bride's residence. After this marriage, Akbar granted the mansab of 1000 and conferred the title 'Raja' upon him. This marriage served very well cause for the house of Marwar. Marwar alliance with Mughal would have broken down due to religious strain estrangement had Jahangir and Shah Jahan not been bound by blood ties. After this marriage Udai Singh and brothers and nephews of Jodh bai succeeded in gaining confidence of their contemporary rules and were recipient of Royal favours.

=== Kalyandas Rathore ===
Historian Norman P. Ziegler relates two accounts of the death of Kalyandas Rathore, his nephew. The version from the Rathore genealogy says Kalyandas took offence at Udai Singh giving his daughter, Jagat Gosain, to Jahangir in marriage, and threatened to kill both men. According to Ziegler, if this is true, the most likely explanation for Kalyandas' opposition is that the marriage implied a subservience that violated the Rajput code of honor. In this version of events, when news of Kalyandas's threats reached Akbar, the emperor ordered Udai Singh to kill Kalyandas. Whatever the cause of the break between Kalyandas and the Mughals, he fled to fort Siwana. Udai Singh pursued him and captured the fort in 1589. Kalyandas died in the fighting.

According to Murārdān, Kalyan Das Rathore took offence at this marriage and was angry at Mota Raja and had remarked –

Why has a daughter been married to the Turks? I shall kill the Prince and Mota Raja!

When the Mota Raja heard to this remark, he informed Akbar who ordered him to kill Kalyan Das. Kalyan Das fled the Imperial Camp to Siwana. Udai Singh sent two of his sons, Bhopat and Jaisingh to Siwana. But the fort and opponent proved too strong for them and they were forced to flee back. On the face of this defeat, Mota Raja received permission from Akbar to leave the imperial camp. After his return to Marwar, he led a force against Siwana himself. Kalyan Das, realizing defeat is imminent, had his wives perform jauhar and himself led his men to die fighting. After this victory, Siwana was handed over to Mota Raja.

== Culture ==
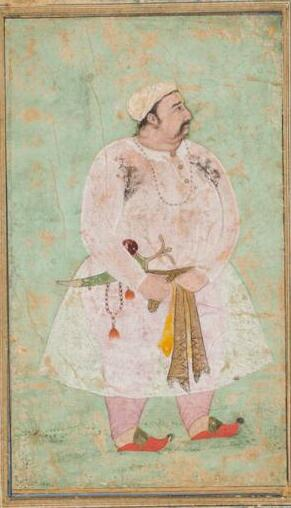
Portrait of Raja Udai Singh of Marwar c.1600

During Udai Singh's reign, respite art and architecture developed in Marwar. The country which had been desolated before the Raja was beginning to grow rapidly.

A part of the fort in Jodhpur was also constructed by the Raja. He also introduced administrative reforms in Marwar on Mughal pattern. He also started the Mughal practice of Peshkash. The system of Dah-Chauki also came in vouge in Marwar during the reign of the Raja.

He also built the Dewal of Rao Maldeo, his father. This was the first of the Royal cenotaphs built at Mandore.

== Later life and death ==
By the end of 1592, he was appointed by Akbar to manage the affairs at Lahore. In 1593, he was again sent to subdue Rao Surtan. After his conquest in Siwana, Udai Singh returned to Lahore on 15 December 1594.

He died of heart attack in Lahore, Punjab, on 10 July 1595.

His son Sur Singh, by his principal wife Manrang Devi, succeeded him to the throne. His youngest son by Manrang Devi, named Kishan Singh, later founded Kishangarh. (Note: The reference do not mention them as sons of Manrang Devi. They, however, do mention as full brothers of Jodh bai, who was born to Manrang Devi)

== Descendants ==
Through his several children, Udai Singh is the common ancestor of several families in northern India. His descendants include :

- Through his successor Sur Singh, he is the ancestor of former ruling houses (Rathore dynasty) of Jodhpur-Marwar and Idar.
- Through his son Dalpat, he is the ancestor of the former ruling houses (Rathore dynasty) of Ratlam, Sitamau and Sailana.
- Through his son Kishan Singh, he is the ancestor of the former ruling house (Rathore dynasty) of Kishangarh.
- Through his son Sakat Singh, he is the ancestor of former ruling house (Rathore dynasty) of Kharwa as well as Thakurs (Sakatsinghots) of Raghunathpura and Nalu.
- Through his daughter Satyabhama bai, he is the ancestor of the former ruling house (Jhala dynasty) of Halvad-Dhrangadhra.
- Through his daughter Manavati Bai, he is the ancestor of the former ruling house (Timurid dynasty) of Mughal Empire.
- Through his daughter Pranmati Bai, he is the ancestor of the former ruling house (Guhilot dynasty) of Dungarpur.
- Through his son Bhupat Singh, he is the ancestor of Thakurs (Bhuptots) of Naraina, Pandarwara, Bhadun and Kherian.
- Through his son Madho Singh he is the ancestor of Thakurs (Govindasots) of Titiari as well as several families in Pisangan, Junian, and Mehrun.

In addition to this, Thakurs which descend from the former ruling houses of Jodhpur-Marwar, Idar, Ratlam, Kishangarh and Kharwa and Thakurs of several places such as Gobindgarh, Gangwana, etc also descend from him.

== See also ==
- Marwar
- Sur Singh

== Note ==
| Preceded by Rao Chandra Sen | Ruler of Marwar; 1583–1595 | Succeeded by Sur Singh |
