= Kishangarh =

- city
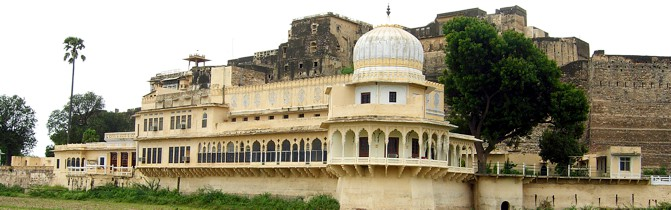
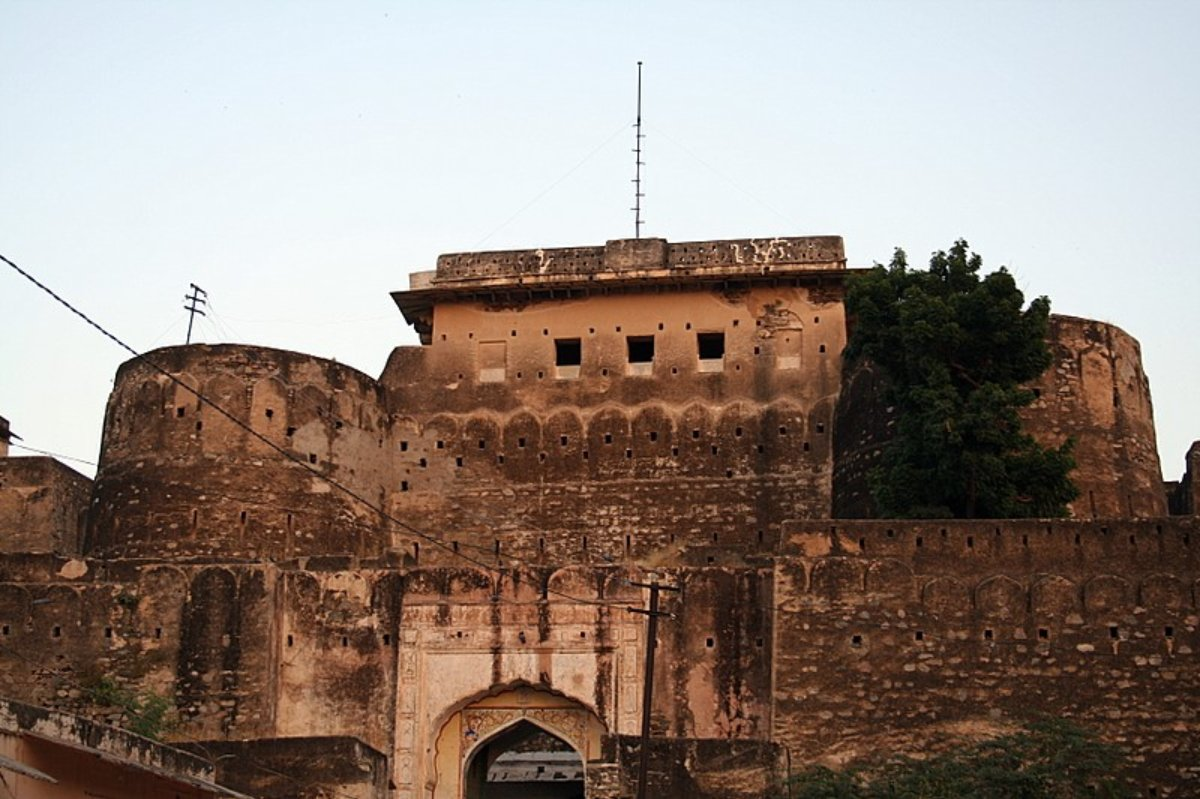
- Phool Mahal Palace Kishangarh Fort
- Nickname: Marble City of India
- Location in Rajasthan, India Kishangarh (India)
- Coordinates: 26.57°N 74.87°E
- Country: India
- State: Rajasthan
- District: Ajmer
- Founder: Raja Kishan Singh
- Named for: Raja Kishan Singh

Government
  - Type: Municipal Council
  - Body: Kishangarh Municipal Council

Area
  - Total: 895.78 km^{2} (345.86 sq mi)
- Elevation: 433 m (1,421 ft)

Population (census 2011)
  - Total: 154,886
  - Rank: 13th in Rajasthan
  - Density: 172.91/km^{2} (447.83/sq mi)

Languages
  - Official: Hindi
  - Additional official: English
  - Regional: Marwari (Rajasthani)
- Time zone: UTC+5:30 (IST)
- PIN: 305801, 305802
- Telephone code: 01463
- ISO 3166 code: RJ-IN
- Vehicle registration: RJ-01, RJ-42
- Website: Kishangarh Municipal Council

Kishangarh is a city and a Municipal Council located in the Ajmer district of the Indian state of Rajasthan. It is the historic capital of the Kishangarh State, founded in 1611 AD by Kishan Singh of the Rathore clan of Rajputs. It is served by Kishangarh Airport.

== Etymology ==
Kishangarh was founded in 1611 AD by Raja Kishan Singh Rathore, the eighth son of Raja Udai Singh of Jodhpur, on the banks of Gundaloo lake. The city is named after its founder, with "Kishan" representing the king's name and "garh," derived from Sanskrit, meaning "fort".

== History ==
Kishangarh State was founded by the Jodhpur prince Kishan Singh in 1609. Before Kishan Singh this area was ruled by Raja Samokhan Singh.

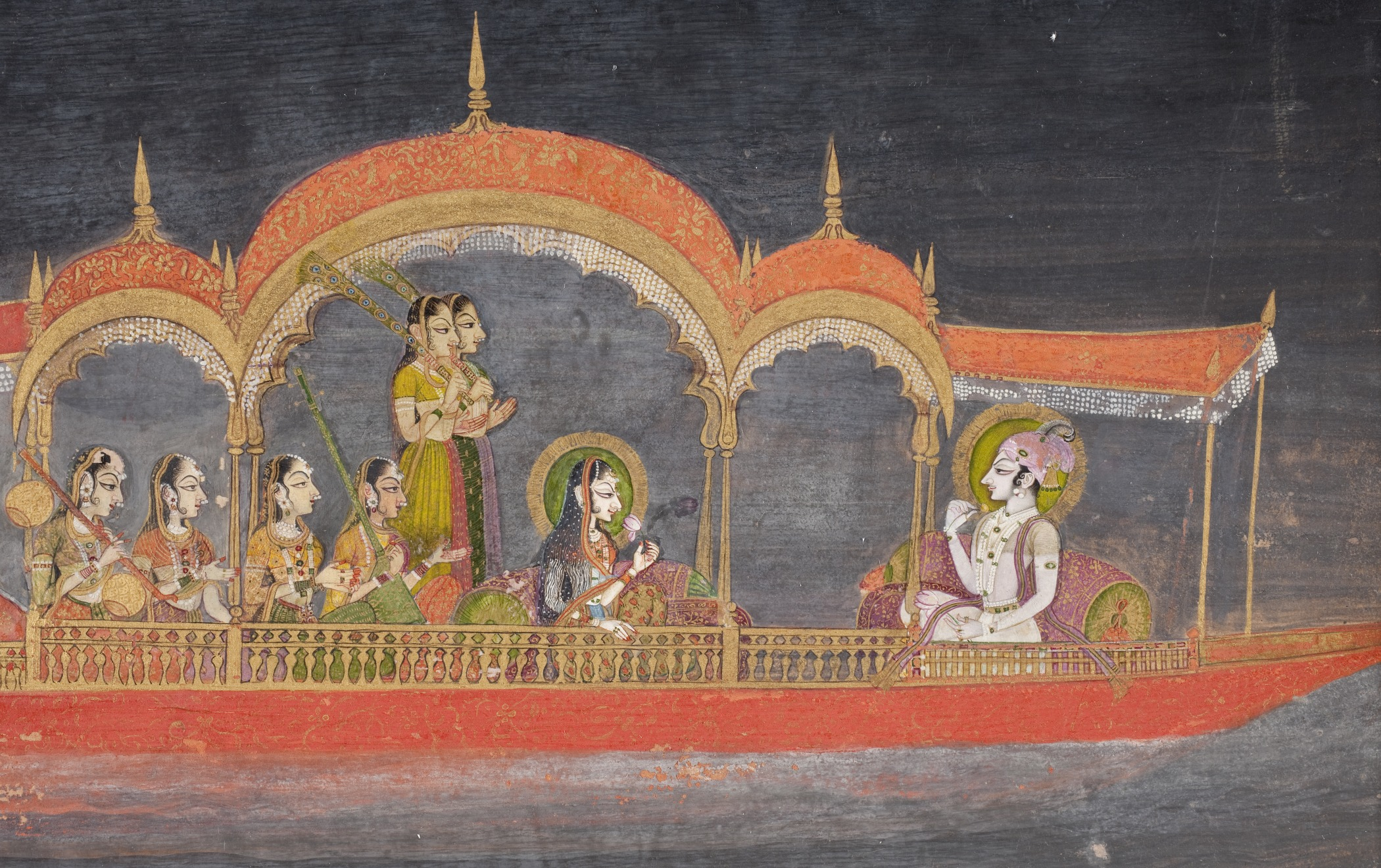
Savant Singh (reigned 1748-1757) and Bani Thani in the Guise of Krishna and Radha Cruising on Lake Gundalao, Kishangarh

Kishangarh was the capital of the eponymous princely state during the British Raj, which was located in the Rajputana Agency. It had an area of 2210 km^{2} (858 miles²) and a population in 1901 of 90,970. This figure for population represented a decrease of 27% over the census figure of 1891, something presumably attributable to the famine of 1899-1900. The state enjoyed an estimated revenue of £34,000 and paid no tribute to the British Raj. In 1840, Prithvi Singh, became the 15th Maharaja of Kishangarh, and reigned until his death in 1879, after which he was succeeded by his son, Sardul Singh.

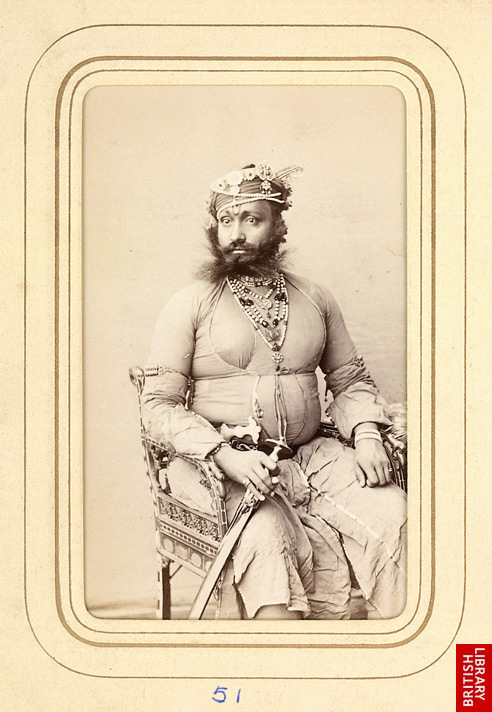
Prithvi Singh (r.1840-1879), 15th Maharaja of Kishangarh, early 1870s.

A municipality was established at Kishangarh in 1892.

Maharaja Madan Singh ascended the throne in 1900 at the age of sixteen, at a time when the state was reeling from the impact of a devastating drought. The administration under him and his diwan was widely deemed worthy of approbation; irrigation from tanks and wells was extended and factories for ginning and pressing cotton were started. A social reform movement for discouraging excessive expenditure on marriages made remarkable impact during his reign.

== Demographics ==
As of 2011 India census, Kishangarh had a population of 154,886. Males constitute about 51% of the population and females 49%. Kishangarh has an average literacy rate of 68%, slightly lower than the national average of 74%: male literacy is 75%, and female literacy is 60%. In Kishangarh, 14% of the population is under 6 years of age.

== Nepheline syenite ==
Kishangarh Nepheline Syenite is among the 32 National Geological Monuments in India notified by Geological Survey of India (GSI), for their protection, maintenance, promotion and enhancement of geotourism. Nepheline syenite here is an intrusion pluton emplaced along the core of an antiform of metamorphites in Aravalli craton which has been dated 1590 million years to 1910 million years old.

== Transport ==
Kishangarh railway station and Gahlota railway station under Jaipur–Ahmedabad line are situated near Kishangarh area.

== See also ==
- Central University of Rajasthan
