= Sadarang =

17-century musician

- Born: Naimat Khan; 1670
- Origin: India
- Died: 1748 (aged 77–78)
- Genres: Hindustani classical music
- Occupation: Hindustani classical music composer

Sadarang (1670–1748) was the pen name of the Hindustani musical composer and artist Naimat Khan, who was active in the eighteenth century. He and his nephew Adarang changed the Khayal style of Hindustani music into the form performed today. Naimat Khan composed Khyal for his disciples and he never performed Khyal.

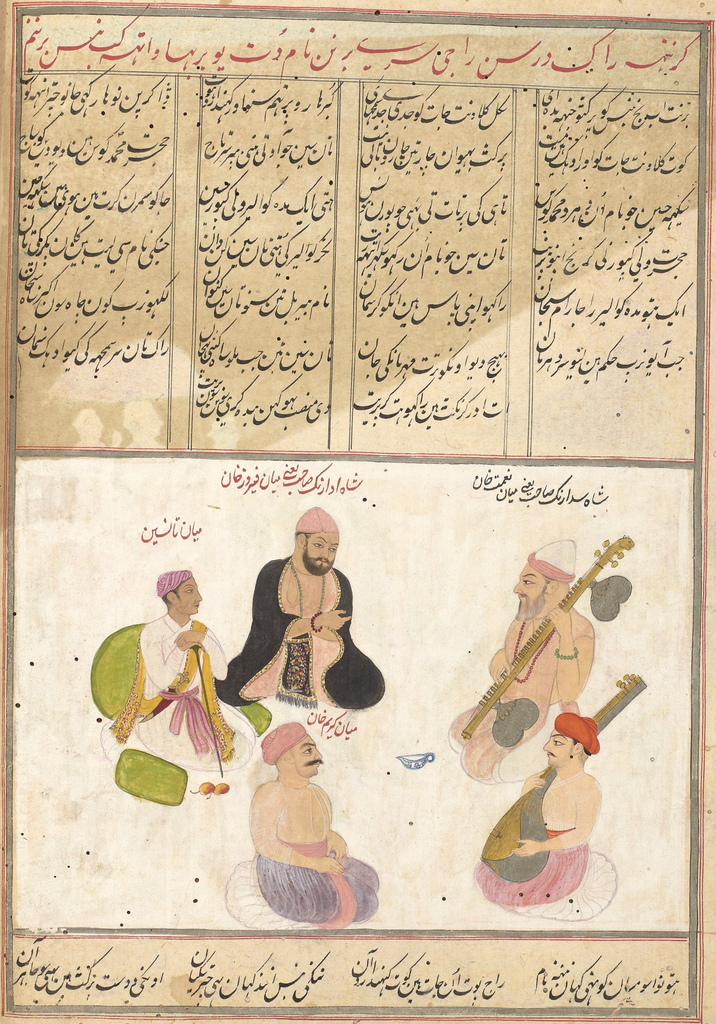
Mughal musician Sadarang accompanied by Miyan Tansen and Adarang teaching his disciples

Sadarang served in the court of Mughal Emperor Muhammad Shah (ruled 1719–1748). Sadarang and Adarang remain influential in Hindustani classical music, mainly through their compositions. Salar Jung Nawwab Dargah Quli Khan, a young noble Deccani who lived in Delhi between 1738 and 1741, had the opportunity to hear Naimat Khan play the Bīn. He wrote in Risala Salar Jung later translated as Muraqqa-i-Dehli, "When he begins to play the Bīn, when the notes of the Bīn throw a spell on the world, the party enters a strange state: people begin to flutter like fish out of water (...).Na’mat Khan is acquainted with all aspects of music.Naimat Khan is considered unequalled and is the pride of the people of Delhi." Naimat khan was the descendant of Naubat Khan. Another famous descendant of Sadarang was Wazir Khan of Rampur.

== See also ==
- Hindustani classical music
- Naubat Khan
