= Tansen =

Hindustani musician

Mian Tānsen
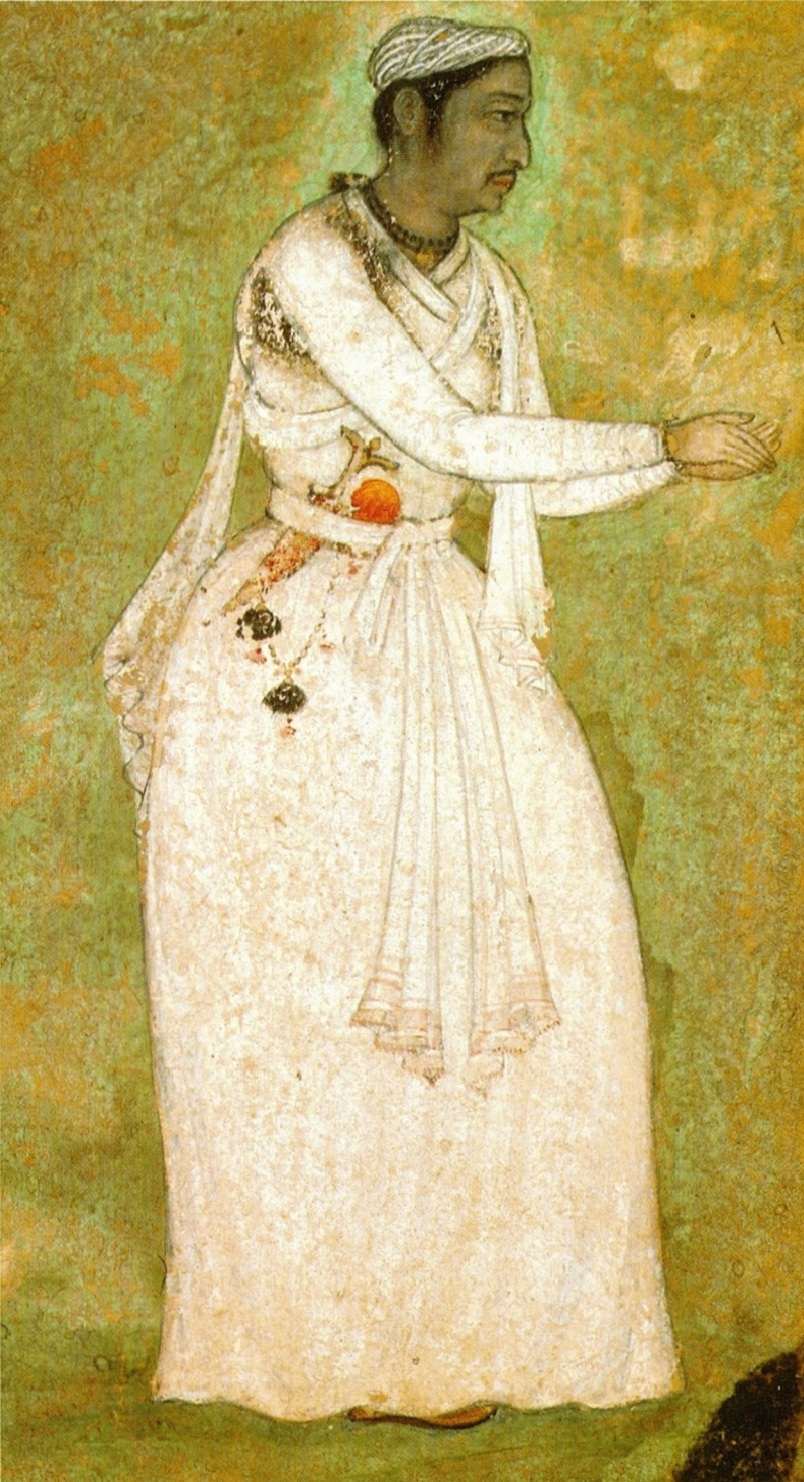
- Portrait of Mian Tansen, c. 1585–90

Background information
- Born: Ramtanu Mukund Gaud (Panday) c. 1493; Gwalior, Tomar Kingdom (modern day Madhya Pradesh, India)
- Died: 26 April 1589 (aged 96) Gwalior, Mughal Empire; India
- Genre: Hindustani Classical Music
- Occupations: Musician, Instrumentalist, Vocalist, Music Studies
- Works: 1. Miyan ki Todi, Todi Thaat, 2.Miyan ki Malhar, Megh Malhar, 3.Sarangi Thaat, 4.Rag Deepak
- Years active: First break at the age of 6, 1498 - 1518: Raja Man Singh Tomar, Gwalior, 1526-1562: Raja Ramchandra Singh, Rewah; After 1562-1589: Emperor Akbar, Gwalior

Rāmtanu Gaud Panday (c. 1493 – 26 April 1589), popularly referred by his stage name as Mian Tānsen (lit. 'the Learned One'), or Sangeet Samrāt (lit. 'Monarch of Hindustani Music'), was a Hindustani classical musician. Born into a Hindu Gaur Brahmin family in Gwalior, he learnt and perfected his art in the northwest region of modern Madhya Pradesh. He got his first break as musician and composer in the court of Raja Man Singh Tomar of Gwalior and spent most of his adult life in the court and patronage of the Hindu king of Rewa, Raja Ramchandra Singh Baghel (r. 1555–1592), where Tānsen's musical abilities and studies gained widespread fame. This reputation brought him to the attention of the Mughal Emperor Akbar. In 1562, at about the age of 60, Tānsen joined Akbar's court, and his performances became the subject of many court historians.

Numerous legends have been written about Tānsen, mixing facts and fiction, and the historicity of these stories is doubtful. Akbar considered him one of the Navaratnas Nine Ministers (the nine jewels) and gave him the title Mian, an honorific, meaning learned man.Tansen was a great composer musician and vocalist, to whom many compositions have been attributed in the northern regions of the Indian subcontinent. He was also an instrumentalist who popularized and improved musical instruments. He is among the most influential personalities in the North Indian tradition of Indian classical music, called Hindustani. His 16th-century studies in music and compositions inspired many, and he is considered by numerous North Indian gharana (regional music schools) to be their lineage founder.

Tānsen is remembered for his epic Dhrupad compositions, creating several new rāgs, as well as for writing two classic books on music, Sri Ganesh Stotra and Sangita Sara.

== Early life ==
Tansen's date of birth is unclear, but most sources place his birth about 1493 CE, or between 1493 and 1506. His biography is also unclear and many conflicting accounts exist, with some common elements. Historical facts about Tansen are difficult to extract from the extensive and contradictory legends that surround him.

According to the common elements in the various stories, Tansen's name as a child was Ramtanu. His father Mukund Ram (also known as Mukund Gaud or Mukund Chand) was a wealthy poet and accomplished musician of Gwalior, who for some time was a Hindu temple priest in Varanasi. According to some versions of the story, it is believed that Tansen was born profoundly mute and did not speak until the age of 5.

Tansen learnt and perfected his art in the city of Gwalior, in modern-day Madhya Pradesh. He began his career from the Imperial Court of Gwalior Kingdom and spent most of his adult life in the court and patronage of the Hindu king of Rewa, Raja Ramchandra Singh, where Tansen's musical abilities and studies gained him widespread fame and following. He was a close confidant of Raja Ramchandra Singh, and they used to make music together. Tansen's reputation brought him to the attention of the Mughal Emperor Akbar, who sent messengers to Raja Ramchandra Singh, requesting Tansen to join the musicians at the Mughal court. Tansen initially refused to go and sought to retire instead into solitude, but Raja Ramchandra Singh persuaded him and sent him to Akbar's court. In 1562, about the age of sixty, Tansen who was still a Vaishnava musician, arrived for the first time in Akbar's court.

Tansen's influence was central to create the Hindustani classical ethos as we know today. He was instrumental in establishing the very first musical gharana the "Gwalior Gharana". A number of descendants and disciples trace him to be their lineage founder. Many gharanas (schools) of Hindustani classical music claim some connection to his lineage. To these gharanas, Tansen is the founder of Hindustani classical music.

== Schooling ==
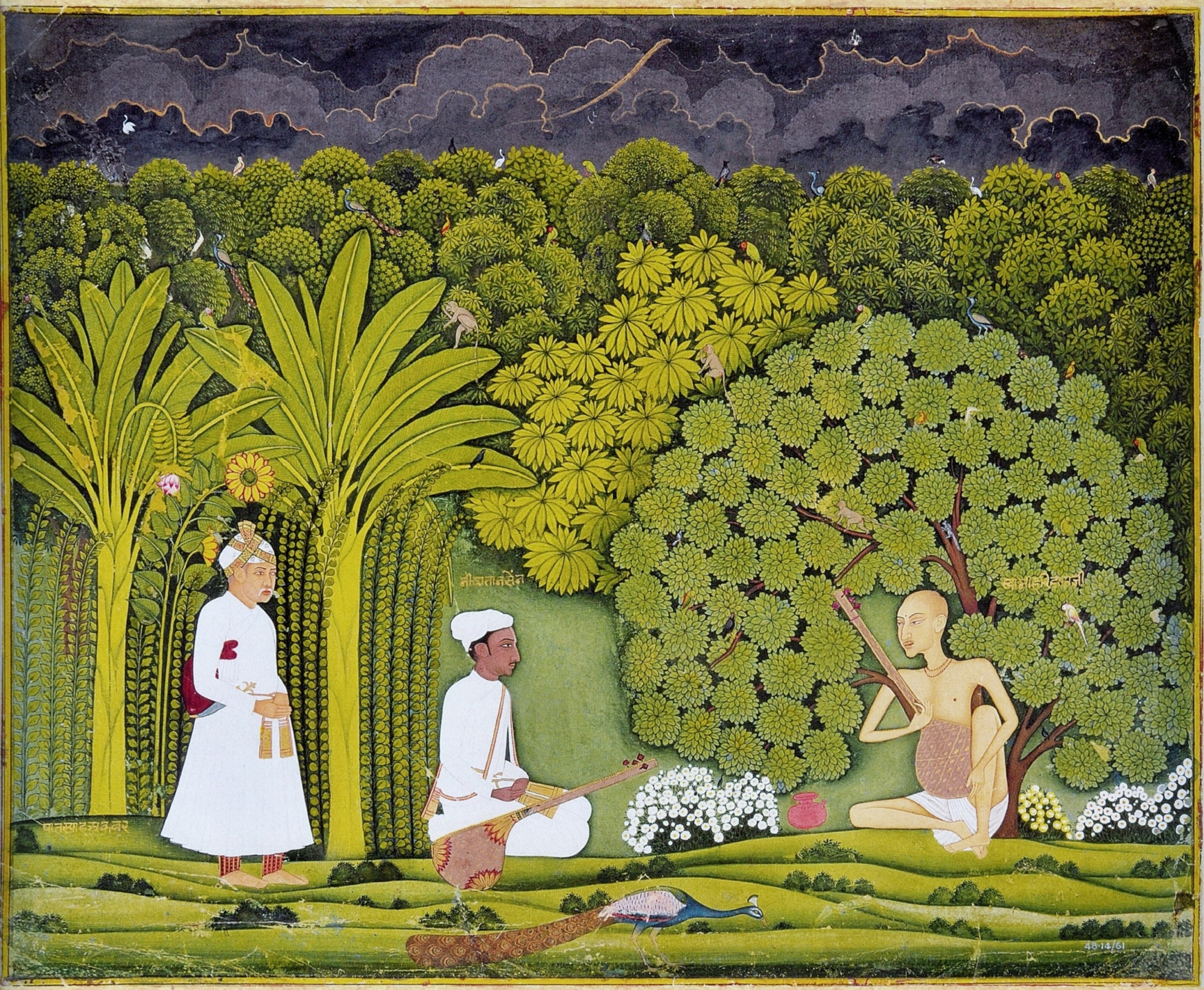
Akbar watching as Tansen receives a lesson from Swami Haridas who was his senior counterpart. Imaginary situation depicted in Mughal miniature painting (Rajasthani style, c. 1750 AD).

The legendary oral versions about Tansen's early life and schooling particularly differ depending on whether the story has origins in Hindu legends (Vaishnavism) or Muslim legends (Sufism). The Hindu bhakti saint, poet and court musician of Raja Man Singh Tomar of Gwalior Swami Haridas was the major influence on Tansen. In Islamic biographies, the Sufi Muslim mystic named Muhammad Ghaus Gwaliori is said to have influenced Tansen. According to Bonnie Wade – a professor of Music specializing in South Asia Studies, Swami Haridas is widely accepted to have been Tansen's counterpart at Gwalior court, and it is clear that Tansen connected with Muhammad Ghaus as well, but the evidence suggests that Tansen is less affiliated with either religion, more with music.

Tansen showed musical talent at the age of 6. At some point, he was discipled to Swami Haridas, for a brief period, the legendary composer from Vrindavan and court musician of the stellar Gwalior court of Raja Man Singh Tomar (1486–1516 AD), specializing in the Dhrupad style of singing. His talent was recognized early and it was the ruler of Gwalior who conferred upon the maestro the honorific title 'Tansen'. Haridas was considered to be a legendary music teacher in that time. It is said that Tansen had no equal apart from his teacher. From Haridas, Tansen acquired not only his love for dhrupad but also his interest in compositions in the local language. This was the time when the Bhakti tradition was fomenting a shift from Sanskrit to the local idiom (Brajbhasa and Hindi), and Tansen's compositions also highlighted this trend. During some point of his apprenticeship, Tansen's father died, and he stayed at home for breavment for a brief period, where it is said that he used to sing at a local Shiva temple in Gwalior.

Hagiographies mention that Tansen met the Sufi mystic Muhammad Ghaus. The interaction with Ghaus brought a strong Sufi influence on Tansen. Later in his life, he continued to compose in Brajbhasha invoking traditional motifs such as Krishna and Shiva.

The presence of musicians like Tansen in Akbar's court was an attempt to accept and integrate the Hindu and Muslim traditions within the Mughal Empire. Tansen became one of the treasured Navaratnas (lit. nava=nine, ratna=jewel) of Akbar's court. He received the honorific title Mian there, and the name Mian Tansen.

=== Compositions ===
Malhar, common raga performed by Tansen
1. Malhar

Tansen's musical compositions covered many themes, and employed Dhrupad. Most of these were derived from the Hindu Puranas, composed in Braj Bhasha, and written in praise of gods and goddesses such as Ganesha, Saraswati, Surya, Shiva, Vishnu (Narayana and Krishna avatar). He also composed and performed compositions dedicated to eulogizing kings and emperor Akbar.

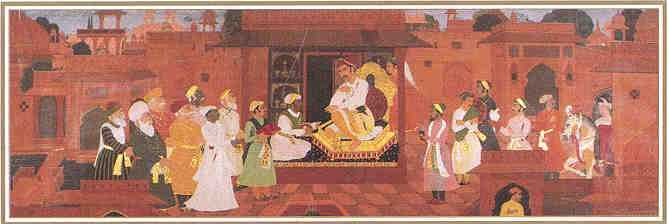
Tansen in Emperor Akbar's Court along with Todarmal, Abul Fazal, Faizi and Abdur Rahim Khan-i-Khana c.16th century

== Family ==
Tansen married a girl named Hussaini, who was from Gwalior, and from this marriage he had four sons and one daughter, namely: Surat Sen, Sarat Sen, Tarang Khan, Bilas Khan and Saraswati. All five became proficient musicians of Gwalior in their own right. His daughter, Saraswati, later married Misri Singh (later came to be known as Naubat Khan), a notable veena player and music composer from Singhalgarh, who was the grandson of Raja Samokhan Singh of Kishangarh. One legend states that Tansen had also been married to a daughter of Akbar, named Mehrunissa, for which he had to convert to Islam.

== Death ==
The year of the death of Tansen, like much of his biography, is unclear. According to some Islamic historians, Tansen died in 1586 in Delhi, and that Akbar and much of his court attended the funeral procession which was completed according to Hindu customs in Gwalior. However, as per Akbarnama, written by Abul Fazl, and as per notable Muslim and Hindu historians give 26 April 1589 as the date and year of his death and that his funeral observed mostly Muslim customs. Scholars states reason to refute the viewpoint of Tansen being converted to Islam due to his belief on Hindu tradition and various composition on Hindu gods. However, some of his later composition shows traces of sufi influence. Tansen's remains were buried in the mausoleum complex of his Sufi master Shaikh Muhammad Ghaus in Gwalior. Every year in December, an annual festival, the Tansen Samaroh, is held in Gwalior to celebrate Tansen life and legacy.

== Popular culture ==
Several Hindi films have been made on Tansen's life, with mostly anecdotal story lines. Some of them are Tansen (1943), a musical hit produced by Ranjit Movietone, starring K. L. Saigal and Khursheed Bano. Tansen (1958) and Sangeet Samrat Tansen (1962). Tansen is also a central character, though remaining mostly in the backdrop, in the historical musical Baiju Bawra (1952), based on the life of his eponymous contemporary.

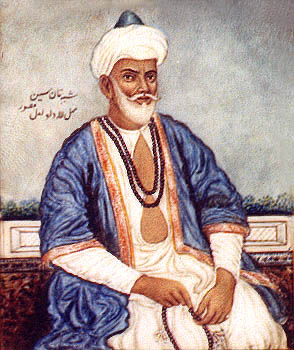
Modern Artist impression of Tansen

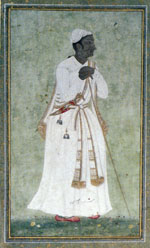
Mughal painting of Tansen c.1580

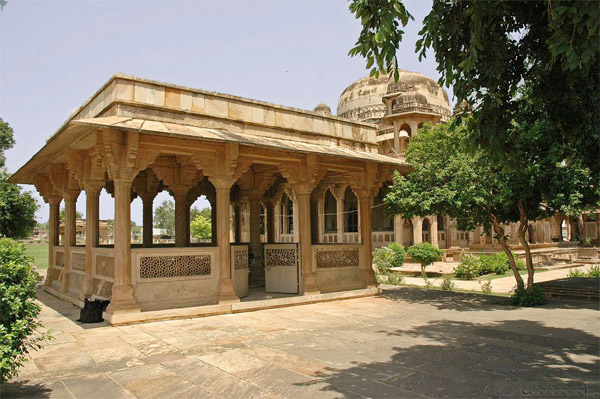
Tansen's tomb in Gwalior, near the tomb of his Sufi master Muhammad Ghaus

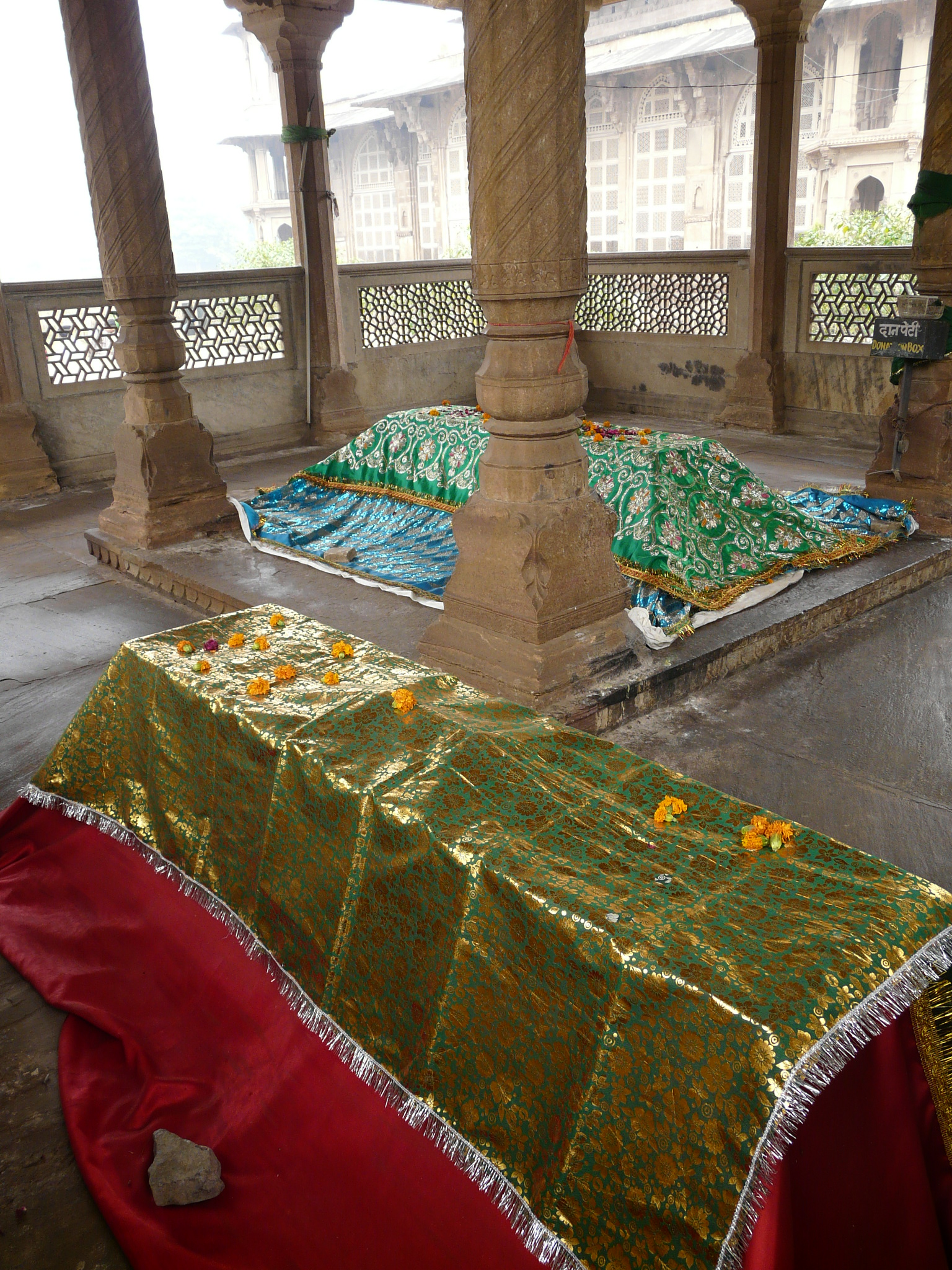
Inside Tansen's tomb

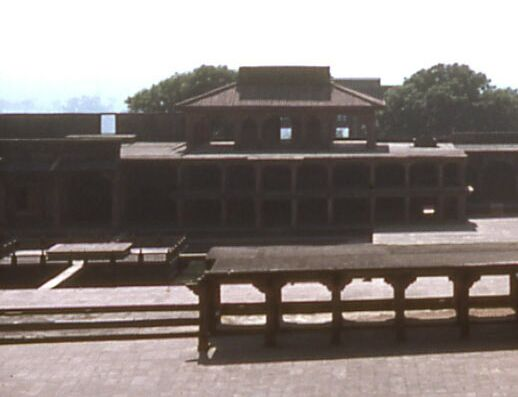
Fatehpur Sikri audience chambers, with Anup Talao on the left.

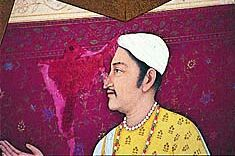
20th century depiction of Tansen

== Legacy ==
=== Tansen award ===
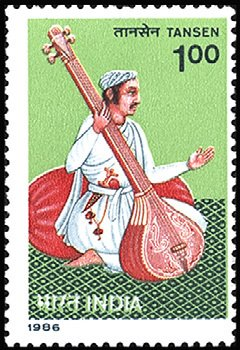
Stamp of India depicting Tansen

A national music festival known as 'Tansen Samaroh' is held every year in December, near the tomb of Tansen at Hazira, Gwalior as a mark of respect to his memory. The Tansen Samman or Tansen award is given away to exponents in Hindustani Classical music.

=== Buildings ===
The fort at Fatehpur Sikri is strongly associated with Tansen's tenure at Akbar's court. Near the emperor's chambers, a pond was built on a small island in the middle, where musical performances were given. Today, this tank, called Anup Talao, can be seen near the public audience hall Diwan-i-Aam – a central platform reachable via four footbridges. It is said that Tansen would perform different ragas at different times of day, and the emperor and his select audience would honour him with coins. Tansen's supposed residence is also nearby.

=== Miracles and legends ===
The bulk of Tansen's biography as found in Akbar court historians' accounts and gharana literature consists of inconsistent and miraculous legends. Among the legends about Tansen are stories of his bringing down the rains with Raga Megh Malhar and lighting lamps by performing Raga Deepak. Raga Megh Malhar is still in the mainstream repertoire, but raga Deepak is no longer known; three different variants exist in the Bilaval (thaat), Poorvi (thaat) and Khamaj (thaat) thaats. It is not clear which, if any, corresponds to the Deepak of Tansen's time. Other legends tell of his ability to bring wild animals to listen with attention (or to talk their language). Once, a wild white elephant was captured, but it was fierce and could not be tamed. Finally, Tansen sang to the elephant who calmed down and the emperor was able to ride him. Besides this, there is also the theory of him being the inventor of rabab-a stringed instruments.

=== Crater ===
A crater on the planet Mercury has been named in Tansen's honor.
