= Gopal Singh of Jhabua =

Raja of Jhabua from 1841 to 1895

Gopal Singh
- Raja
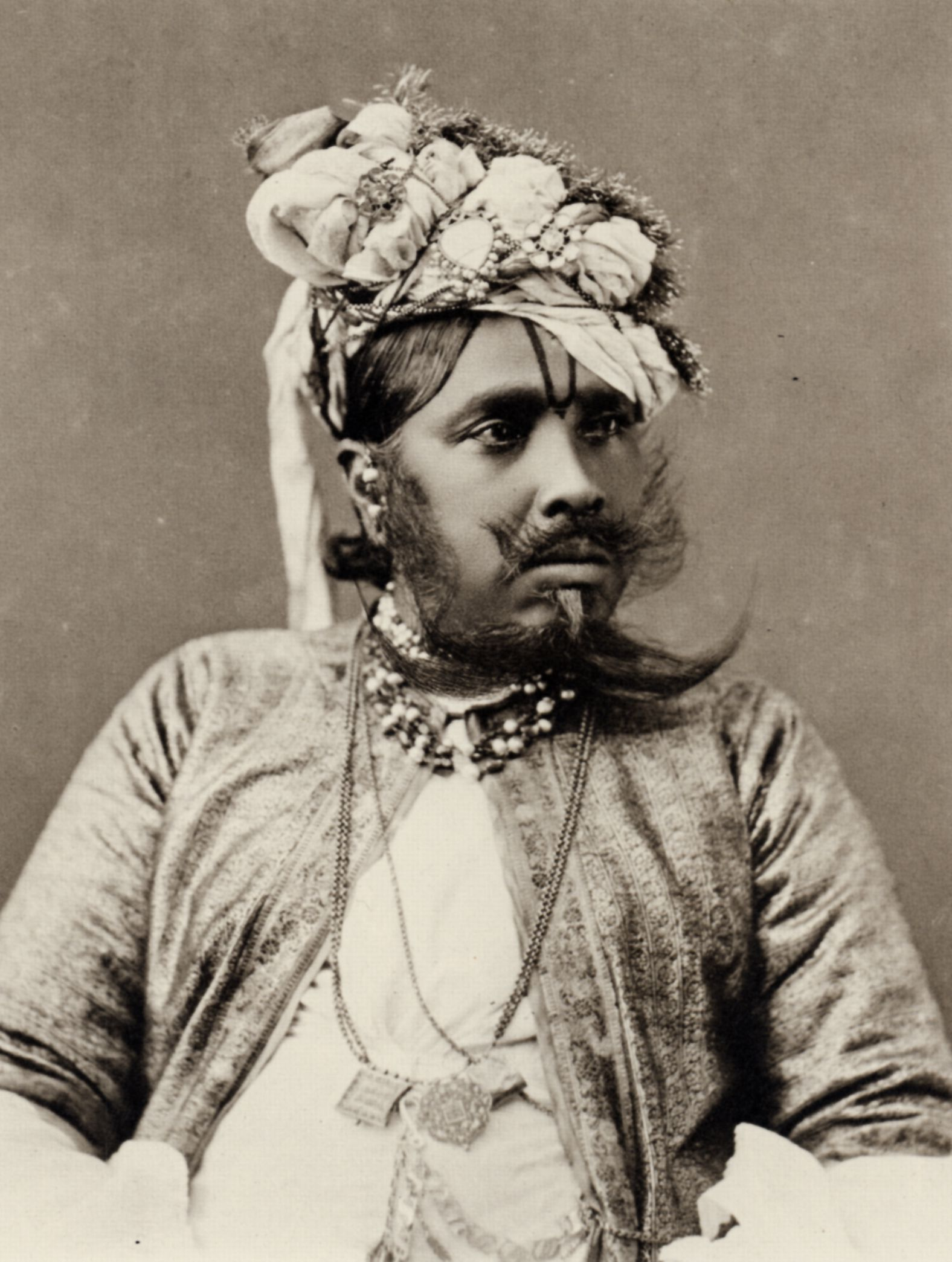

Raja of Jhabua
- Reign: October 1841 – c. 1895
- Predecessor: Ratan Singh
- Successor: Udai Singh
- Born: 22 February 1841
- Died: c. 1895
- House: Jhabua
- Dynasty: Rathore
- Father: Ratan Singh

Gopal Singh was the Raja of Jhabua from 1841 until his death in 1895.

== Early life and family ==
Gopal Singh was born on 22 February 1841, four months after the death of his father, Ratan Singh. In 1893, he adopted Udai Singh, son of Raghunath Singh, the Thakur of Khawasa, a tributary of Jhabua.

== Succession ==
He succeeded his late father as the Raja of Jhabua in October 1841. As he was a minor at the time, his grandmother served as regent and governed state affairs.

== Reign ==
In 1841, while he was still a minor, disturbances arose in Thandla, and the aid of the Political Agent at Mandleshwar was sought. He brought a small force with him and quelled the disturbances. During the Indian Rebellion of 1857, when the Raja of Amjhera revolted and attacked Hutchinson, the Political Agent at Bhopawar, Hutchinson and his companions fled. Upon reaching Para, they sent a message to Gopal, requesting his protection and shelter. Gopal immediately sent an escort to bring them to Jhabua. When they arrived in Jhabua, he and his grandmother welcomed them kindly and ensured their safety and comfort. However, the local Arab faction demanded their surrender, but he and his grandmother entrusted their protection to their Rajput retainers. No Arab sepoy was allowed to approach the part of the palace where they were kept. They remained his guests for five days until Holkar sent an escort from Indore to take them to Mhow. In recognition of this, the Government of India presented him with a khilat of Rs. 12,500. He was invested with it by Henry Daly on 9 February 1878. They also significantly reduced Jhabua’s contribution toward the maintenance of the Malwa Bhil Corps. Charles Canning, the then Governor-General of India, sent him a kharita, acknowledging the services rendered by him and his state. He was granted full administrative powers in 1859. In 1865, he was fined Rs. 10,000 and had his salute discontinued for one year after allowing the mutilation of a prisoner who was confined under suspicion of theft. He was also required to settle a pension of Rs. 15 per month for that man.

== Death ==
He died in 1895 and was succeeded by Udai Singh.
