= Pratap Singh II of Alirajpur =

Ruler of Alirajpur from 1891 to 1941

Maharaja Sir Pratap Singh II
- Maharaja

Raja of Alirajpur
- Reign: 1891 – 1941
- Coronation: 1892
- Investiture: 1904
- Predecessor: Bijai Singh
- Successor: Fateh Singh
- Born: 12 September 1881
- Spouse: Yadavji Raj Kunvarba of Kathiwara State; Khichanji Dev Kunvarba of Chota Udaipur State
- Issue: Fateh Singh; Maharajkumariji Anand Kanwarji m.to Raja Kishore Chandra Mardraj Harichandan of Nilgiri State
- House: Alirajpur
- Dynasty: Rathore
- Father: Rao Bhagwan Singh

HH Maharaja Sir Pratap Singh II KCIE was the Rathore Rajput ruler of Alirajpur State in the southern most part of Malwa region from the year 1891 until his abdication in 1941.

== Birth ==
He was born on 12 September 1881 to Bhagwan Singh, Thakur of Sondwa.

== Education ==
He was educated at Daly College, Indore.

== Succession ==
When Bijai Singh died on 16 August 1890, he left behind no heirs to succeed him. In 1891, Pratap was selected by the Government of India to succeed his cousin. He was formally installed in March 1892. As he was a minor at the time, the State was managed by a kamdar under the supervision of the Political Agent until he came of age. He was granted full administrative powers in June 1904.

== Personal life ==
He was a keen sportsman who won many trophies in polo and shikar.

=== Marriages ===
He married first in the year 1900 to the daughter of Thakore Saheb Bahadur Sinhji, of Kathiwara State , and secondly in 1902 to a granddaughter of Maharawal Jit Sinhji and daughter of Kumarji Chandra Sinhji younger brother of Maharawal Moti Sinhji of the neighbouring Chhota Udaipur State.

== Honours ==
During the Delhi Durbar of 1911, he was conferred the hereditary title of Raja. He was created the CIE on 3 June 1915 and made KCIE on 3 June 1933. In 1917, George V appointed him to the Order of Saint John.
