= Dileep Singh of Jhabua =

Raja of Jhabua from 1942 to 1965

Dileep Singh
- Raja
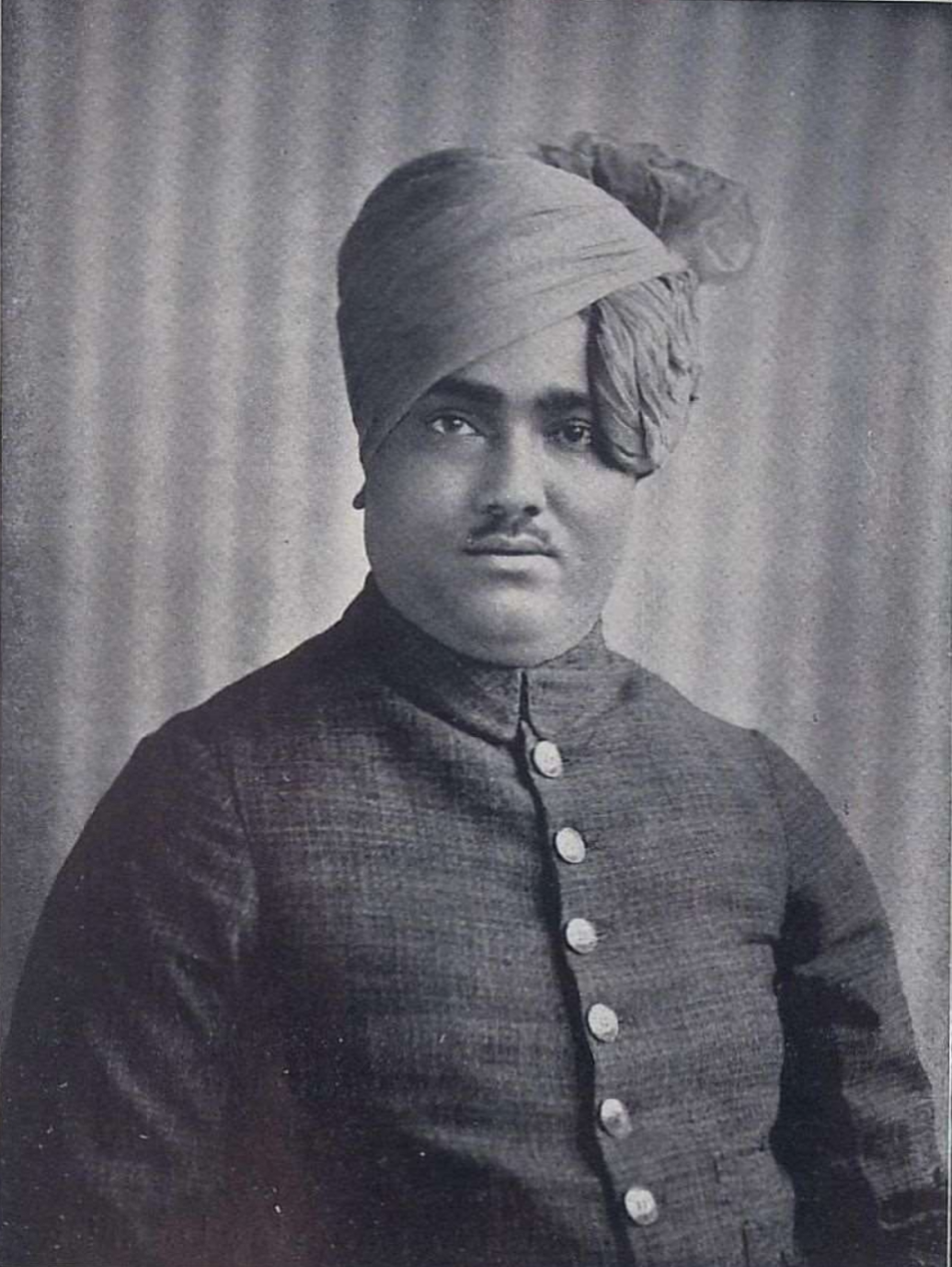

Raja of Jhabua
- Reign: c. 1942 – 23 February 1965
- Predecessor: Udai Singh
- Successor: Ajit Singh
- Born: 26 February 1905
- Died: 23 February 1965 (aged 59)
- House: Jhabua
- Dynasty: Rathore
- Father: Kesar Singh

Dileep Singh (or Dilip Singh) was the Raja of Jhabua from 1942 until his death in 1965.

== Early life, family and education ==
He was born on 26 February 1905 to Kesar Singh, the Thakur of Khawasa. He had his education at Agra and Aligarh. He was subsequently placed at Indore for training in revenue and settlement work, and for judicial training, he was placed in the district court at Mhow. He began his career as a railway magistrate and was thereafter appointed kamdar of Ratanmal by the Malwa Political Agency. When, on account of Udai Singh's inability to rule properly, the Government of India, on 29 September 1934, removed him from power and took Jhabua into administration, a Council of Administration was founded to govern the state's affairs. He was appointed its president. Under his supervision, the council restructured the administrative framework and operations of the state. He increased salaries for the revenue staff and assigned assistants to revenue officers and surveyors. He established two new patwari circles and appointed a new patwari in each tehsil. He appointed a tadvi or a headman in each village. He increased the number of excise inspectors as well as their salaries.

== Succession ==
When, in 1942, Udai Singh, the Raja of Jhabua, died, the question arose as to who would succeed him, as he had neither left a male heir of his body nor an adopted son. In this case, the then Viceroy and Governor-General of India, after carefully considering all aspects of the matter and acting in the best interests of the state, exercised his discretion with the approval of the Secretary of State for India and selected Dileep as his successor.

== Reign ==
He signed the instrument of accession on 15 August 1947, whereby he acceded his state to the Dominion of India. He was made KCIE in 1947.

== Death ==
He died on 23 February 1965 and was succeeded by his son, Ajit Singh.
