= Bijai Singh of Alirajpur =

Ruler of Alirajpur from 1881 to 16 August 1890

Bijai Singh

Rana of Alirajpur
- Reign: 1881 – 16 August 1890
- Predecessor: Rup Deo
- Successor: Pratap Singh
- Died: 16 August 1890
- House: Alirajpur
- Dynasty: Rathore

Bijai Singh (sometimes Bijay Singh, Waje Singh Sachan or Vijay Singh Sachan) was Rana of Alirajpur from 1881 until his death on 16 August 1890.

== Education ==
He was educated at the Daly College, Indore. He remained there until 1888.

== Succession ==
When Rup Deo died in 1881 without leaving behind a male heir to succeed him, and as he held no adoption sanad, it appeared that the ruling family of Alirajpur was extinct and that Alirajpur had escheated to the Government of India. But the government decided to appoint a successor to the deceased. When it was announced, many put forward claims to the vacant throne of Alirajpur. One of these was Bijai Singh, a son of the Thakur of Sondwa, who was a distant relative of the deceased, and his claim was supported by the ladies of the family. His claim was also supported by the most influential people in the Alirajpur. He was a minor at the time and was studying. The second claimant was Kalubawa. Another claimant was the ruler of Dharampur, acting on behalf of one of his sons, on the grounds of being the next of kin, as he was fourth in descent from one of the members of the Alirajpur family who had been called to Dharampur. He argued that when heirs had failed in Dharampur, successors had been taken from Alirajpur, and therefore, in the reverse case, a successor should be taken from Dharampur. After carefully investigating the qualifications and claims of these claimants, the Government of India selected Bijai as the successor to the deceased.

== Reign ==
At the outset of the reign of Bijai Singh, Jit Singh, the Thakur of Phulwal, led an uprising against him. He did this because he wanted to sit on the throne of Alirajpur himself. Using his wealth and influence, Jit persuaded the Bhil and Bhilala leaders, Bhawan and Chitu, to join him. Many Makranis, led by Dad Muhammad, also aligned with Jit. Jit Singh and his faction plundered the towns of Nanpur, Bhavra, and Chhaktala. When rebels in Alirajpur, the Government of India intervened and sent the Malwa Bhil Corps and Central India Horse, which dispersed them. Over time, the rebels were brought to justice, while Jit died in Gujarat, and his estate escheated to the state. As he was a minor, Jawan Singh, Thakur of Jhaknawada under Jhabua, was appointed Superintendent of Alirajpur to administer the affairs of the state until Bijai came of age. In 1890, two years after his return from Indore, the Government decided to give him tentative administrative charge of Nanpur and Khattali. Before he could be invested with these limited powers, he died.

== Death ==
He died on 16 August 1890 and was succeeded by Pratap Singh.
