= Kishore Chandra Mardraj Harichandan =

Raja of Nilgiri (1913-1960)

- Raja

Raja of Nilgiri
- Reign: 6 July 1913 – 29 March 1960
- Predecessor: Shyam Chandra Mardraj Harichandan
- Successor: Rajendra Chandra Mardaraj Harichandan
- Born: 2 February 1904
- Died: 29 March 1960 (aged 56)
- Spouse: Anand Kumari; Giriraj Kumari
- Issue Detail: Kamlesh Manjari Devi; Swarnalata Manjari Devi; Rajendra Chandra Mardaraj Harichandan; Snehalata Manjari Devi; Bharatendra Chandra Mardaraj Harichandan; Rathendra Chandra Mardaraj Harichandan; Surendra Chandra Mardaraj Harichandan; Kirendra Chandra Mardaraj Harichandan
- House: Nilgiri
- Father: Shyam Chandra Mardraj Harichandan
- Education: Mayo College

Kishore Chandra Mardraj Harichandan was the Raja of Nilgiri from 1893 until his death in 1913.

== Early life, education, and family ==
He was born on 2 February 1904 to Shyam Chandra Mardraj Harichandan. He was educated at Mayo College in Ajmer. He married twice, firstly on 28 February 1922 to Anand Kumari, daughter of Pratap Singh, the Raja of Alirajpur, and secondly on 19 July 1925 to Giriraj Kamari, daughter of the Thakore of Thakurgaon. By his first wife, he had a daughter, Kamlesh Manjari Devi. By his second wife, he had five sons—Rajendra Chandra Mardaraj Harichandan, Bharatendra Chandra Mardaraj Harichandan, Rathendra Chandra Mardaraj Harichandan, Surendra Chandra Mardaraj Harichandan, and Kirendra Chandra Mardaraj Harichandan—and two daughters, Swarnalata Manjari Devi and Snehalata Manjari Devi.

== Reign ==
Upon the death of his father on 6 July 1913, he succeeded him as the Raja of Nilgiri. As he was a minor, the administration of the state was placed under the management of the Government. He was invested with full administrative powers on 2 February 1925 and with the powers of a sessions judge on 28 August 1933.

== Death ==
He died on 29 March 1960 and was succeeded by Rajendra Chandra Mardaraj Harichandan in his title, rank, and dignity.
