= Jhabua =

- City
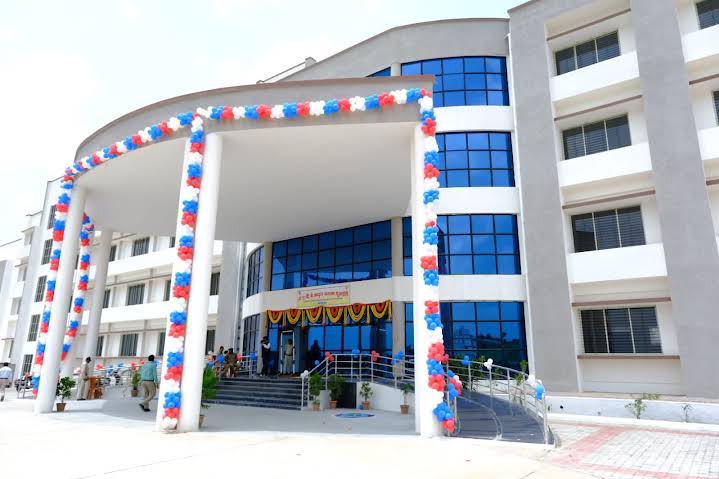
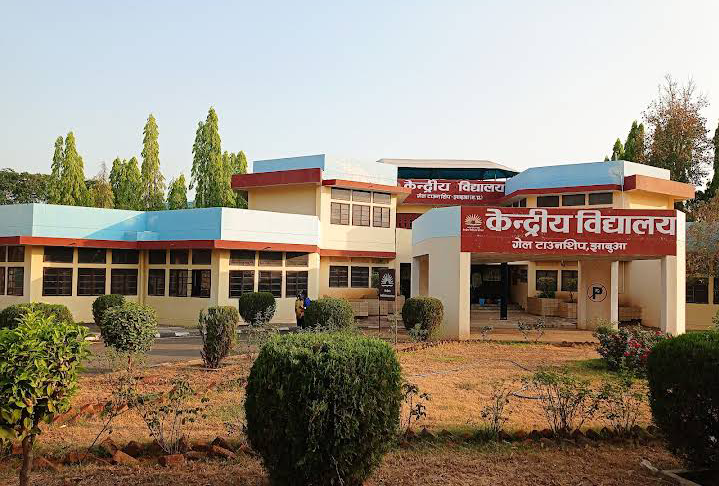
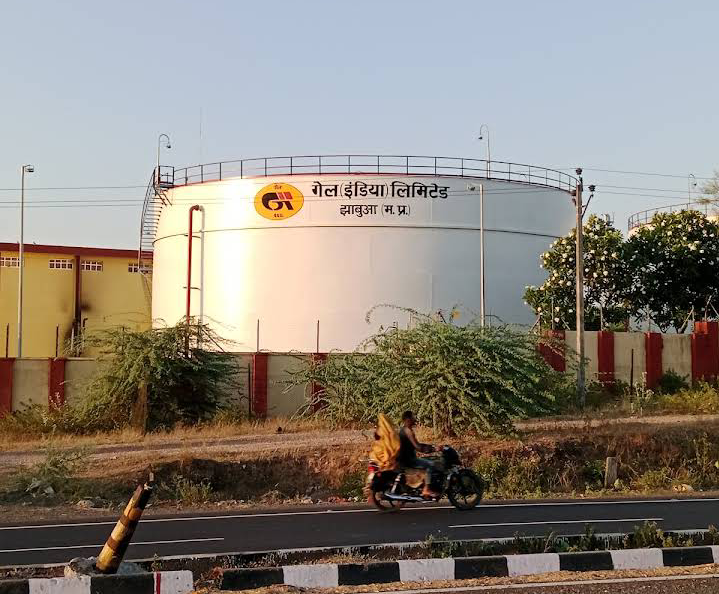
- Dr. APJ Abdul Kalam University Institute of Technology GAIL Jhabua

- Location within Madhya Pradesh Location within India
- Coordinates: 22°46′11.102″N 74°35′31.574″E
- Country: India
- State: Madhya Pradesh
- District: Jhabua
- Founder: King Kasumar Bhil
- Named for: King Jhabbu Bhil
- Elevation: 318 m (1,043 ft)

Population (2011)
  - Total: 35,753

Languages
  - Official: Hindi, Bhili
- Time zone: UTC+5:30 (IST)
- Postal code: 457661
- Vehicle registration: MP-45
- Website: jhabua.nic.in

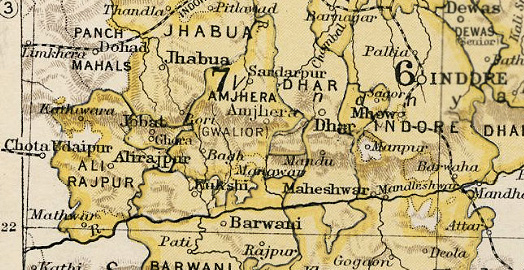
Jhabua State in the Imperial Gazetteer of India

Jhabua is a town and a municipality in Jhabua district in the Indian state of Madhya Pradesh. It is the administrative headquarters of Jhabua District.

Recently the district has got international recognition because of its endemic hen species "kadaknath". It has been granted the GI tag.

== History ==
The ancestor of the family was Rao Bar Singh a.k.a. the Birji, fifth son of Jodha of Mandore of Marwar. His descendant, Kunwar Kesho Das or Kishan Das, founded Jhabua in 1584.

Raja Kesho Das, also known as Keshav Das or Kishan Das, was the first Raja of Jhabua from 1584 to 1607. He was granted the title of Raja by the Emperor of Delhi, as a reward for a successful campaign in Bengal, and for punishing the Bhil chiefs of Jhabua who had murdered an Imperial Viceroy of Gujarat.

Khushal Singh was the ruler of Jhabua in 1698, he gave much of his lands to his brothers and sons and was too weak to rule his state effectively. This allowed the Marathas to actively invade Jhabua on a regular basis. Raja Shiv Singh was an infant and therefore the states administration during this time was managed by the raja's mother and the nobles. The Marathas under Holkar took advantage of this situation to take control of Jhabua. The threat from Jai Singh of Sailana forced the nobles of Jhabua to rely on Maratha protection, Holkar thus sent his officers to manage the states affairs. Jhabua later came under British protection in 1817 A.D. and was under the Bhopawar Agency of the Central India Agency and in 1927 it became part of the Malwa Agency.There were 20 families of rank in the state who paid £1500 to the Holkars and £2500 to their own chief. In 1875 the state had a population of 55,000 and a revenue of £22,500. After India's independence in 1947, Jhabua's last ruler signed the accession to the Indian Union on 15 June 1948, and Jhabua became part of the newly created Madhya Bharat state, which in 1956 was merged into Madhya Pradesh.

=== Jhabua Princely State ===
Jhabua was the capital of a princely state of the British Raj's Central India, in the Bhopawar agency. Its area, with the dependency of Rutanmal, was approx 1,336 square miles (3,460 km^{2}). The Rajas of Jhabua belonged to the Rathor dynasty.

Name	Year
Karan Singh	1607–1610
Mah Singh	1610–1677
Kushal Singh	1677–1723
Anup Singh	1723–1727
Sheo Singh	1727–1758
Bahadur Singh	1758–1770
Bhim Singh	1770–1821
Pratap Singh	1821–1832
Ratan Singh	1832–1840
Gopal Singh	1841–1895
Udai Singh	1895–1942
Dilip Singh (titular post independence)	1942–1965
Ajit Singh (titular)	1965–2002
Narendra Singh (titular)	2002 – present

=== Post-Independence ===
After India's independence in 1947, its rulers acceded to India, and Jhabua became a part of the newly created Madhya Bharat state, which in 1956 was merged into Madhya Pradesh.

Bhabhara which was once part of the Jhabua district, is the place where Chandrasekhar Azad, the freedom fighter spent his early life when his father Pandit Sitaram Tiwari was serving in the erstwhile estate of Alirajpur. But, when Alirajpur district (which was once the part of Jhabua district) got separated from Jhabua, Bhabhra became the part of Alirajpur district.

== Geography ==
Jhabua has an average elevation of 318 metres (1043 feet). Jhabua is located at the bottom left side of MP, mainly towards Gujarat.

== Demographics ==
As of 2001 India census, Jhabua had a population of 30,577. Males constitute 52% of the population and females 48%. As per 2011 census, Jhabua has an average literacy rate of 44%. Male literacy is at 54% and female literacy is 34%. In Jhabua, 20% of the population is under 6 years of age.

Jhabua city is famous for its black cotton soil commonly known as "White Gold". There are many interesting places in Jhabua Thasil.

More than 65% of Population is below poverty line.

== Educational status of Jhabua ==
There is one government college SCAMV (Shaheed Chandra Shekhar Azad Mahavidyalaya) which imparts post graduate education and a government engineering college Dr. APJ Abdul Kalam UIT Jhabua.

Some of the private colleges are Maa Tripura College of Nursing, Padma College of Education, Maa Sharda College of Nursing, Maa Sharda College of Education. Some of the top English schools are Kendriya Vidyalaya, New Catholic Mission School, Sharda Vidhya Mandir and Keshav International School.

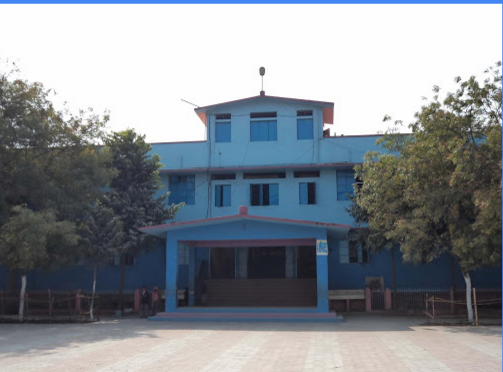
This is the building of The new catholic mission school, Jhabua

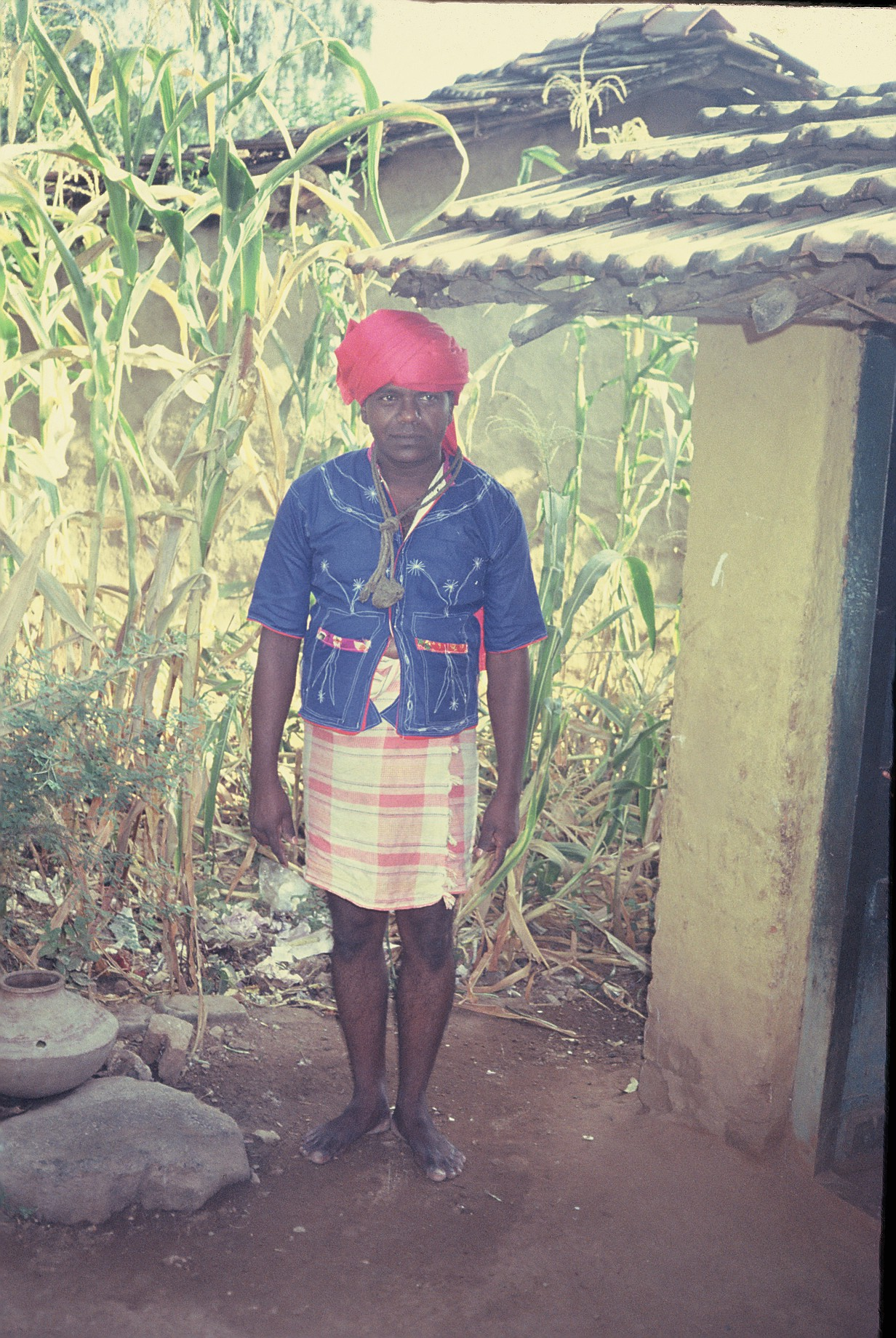
P T Thomas, Linguist, in 1990s

== People ==
- Jhabbu Nayak, founder of Jhabua dynasty
- Kantilal Bhuria, Tribal leader & Politician.
- P T Thomas, Linguist and Bible Translator

== See also ==
- Gopal Mandir Jhabua – Hindu temple in Jhabua, Madhya Pradesh
