= Udai Singh of Jhabua =

Raja of Jhabua from 1895 to 1942

Udai Singh
- Raja
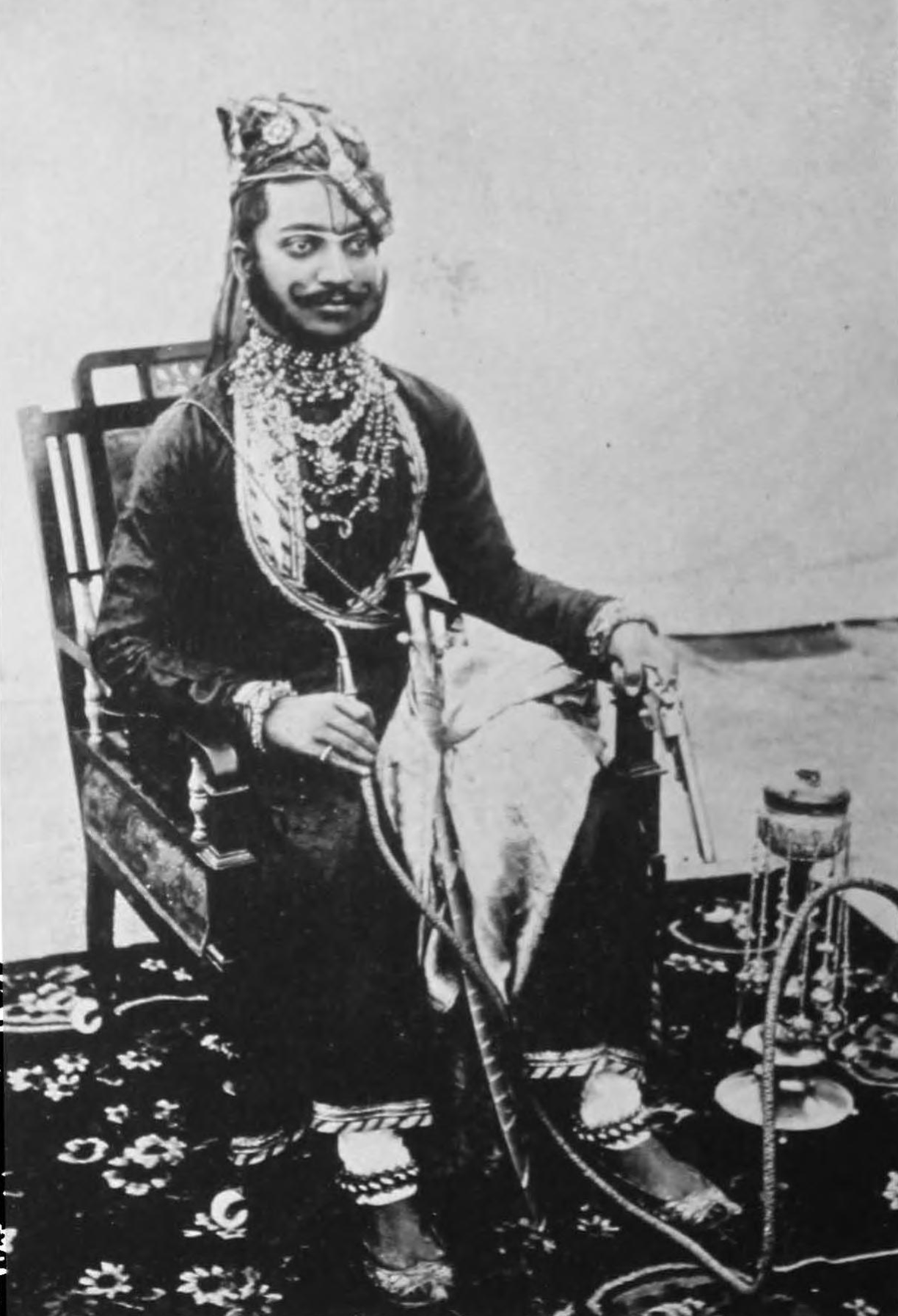

Raja of Jhabua
- Reign: 22 January 1895 – c. 1942
- Predecessor: Gopal Singh
- Successor: Dileep Singh
- Born: 6 May 1875
- Died: c. 1942
- House: Jhabua
- Dynasty: Rathore
- Father: Gopal Singh (adoptive); Raghunath Singh (biological)

Udai Singh was the Raja of Jhabua from the year 1895 until his death in 1942.

== Early life and family ==
He was born on 6 May 1875 as the second son of Raghunath Singh, Thakur of Khawasa. He was adopted by Gopal Singh, the Raja of Jhabua, sometime before the Raja's death, and his adoption was sanctioned by the Government of India. He was the twelfth in line of descent from Kesho Das, the founder of the Jhabua. He married four times. First, in 1907, to the sister of the Raja of Sant; second, in 1912, to the daughter of the Thakur of Dhariyawad; and third, also in 1912, to the daughter of the Raja of Sheopur-Baroda.

== Succession ==
Upon the death of his adoptive father, he succeeded him as Raja of Jhabua on 22 January 1895.

== Reign ==
He was granted full administrative powers in 1898. During the Indian famine of 1899–1900, he had to borrow Rs. 100,000 from the Maharaja Scindia of Gwalior through the British government and Rs. 377,000 directly from the British government to sustain the administration. Due to the disastrous effects of famine and mismanagement on the state's monetary resources, his powers were curtailed in 1900, and he was required to follow the advice of his Diwan. His powers were restored in 1918 under certain conditions. They were curtailed again in 1928 and later restored in 1931. He was forced to retire from the administration of the state and was required to reside in Indore. From 29 September 1934, his nephew, Dileep Singh from Khawasa, was appointed to the Council of Administration by the Government of India to manage state affairs.

== Death ==
He died in 1942 and was succeeded by Dileep Singh.
