= Fateh Singh of Alirajpur =

Ruler of Alirajpur in 1941

Fateh Singh
- Raja

Raja of Alirajpur
- Reign: 1941 – 23 October 1941
- Predecessor: Pratap Singh
- Successor: Surendra Singh
- Born: 22 August 1904
- Died: 23 October 1941 (aged 37)
- House: Alirajpur
- Dynasty: Rathore
- Father: Pratap Singh

Fateh Singh, also spelt Fatehsinhji (22 August 1904 – 23 October 1941) was the Raja of Alirajpur from the day of his father's abdication in 1941 until his own death on 23 October 1941.

== Early life, family, and education ==
He was born on 22 August 1904 to Pratap Singh. He received his education at Daly College, Indore, and Rajkumar College, Rajkot. On 7 May 1922, he married the daughter of the Raja of Baria. He had four sons. The eldest, Surendra Singh, was born on 17 March 1923; the second, Narendra Singh, on 5 May 1928; the third, Kamlendra Singh, on 30 December 1933; and the fourth on 3 October 1938. He also had three daughters. In 1923, he was appointed in charge of the tehsils of Nandpur and Chandpur. At the same time, he was vested with the powers of a first-class magistrate. He served as the chief commandant of the state forces of Alirajpur.

== Personal life ==
He was a fellow of the Royal Geographical Society. He played polo and cricket. He regularly played polo for the Baria and Ratlam teams. A batsman, he captained the Freelooters cricket team in the Moin-ud-Dowlah Gold Cup Tournament for three years from 1932 to 1934.

== Death ==
He died of pneumonia on 23 October 1941.
