= Barkhera Panth State =

Princely state

- Princely State of British India
- Area
  - 1931: 7.7959 km^{2} (3.0100 sq mi)
- Population
  - 1931: 357
Succeeded by
India

Barkhera Panth State was a minor princely state during the British Raj in what is today Madhya Pradesh and it was administered by the Malwa Agency. The state had a population of 357 and an area of 3.01 sq miles.

It was an estate located in Jaora State and the Thakur was recognized by the Indian Colonial Government as a guaranteed holder in 1896.

== Rulers ==
The Rulers bore the title of Thakur.

- Thakur Bhowani Singh -ca.1894
- Thakur Amar Singh (b. February 26, 1880) November 21, 1894 - fl. 1918, son and successor of Bhowani Singh
