= Jaswant Singh of Alirajpur =

Rana of Alirajpur from 1818 to 1862

Rana Jaswant Singh
- Rana

Rana of Alirajpur
- Reign: 1818 – 1862
- Predecessor: Rana Pratap Singh
- Successor: Rana Ganga Deo
- Born: 1818
- Died: 17 March 1862 (aged 43–44)
- Spouse: Umaid Kanwarji
- Issue: Ganga Deo; Rup Deo
- House: Alirajpur
- Dynasty: Rathore
- Father: Rana Pratap Singh

Rana Jaswant Singh was the Rathore-Rajput ruler of one of its early sub-clan of Alirajpur State from the year 1818 until his death in 1862.He was succeeded by his two sons one after the other and Rana Rup Deo's death marked the end to the continued line of succession from late 16th century.

== Birth ==
Jaswant Singh was born posthumously in 1818 to Pratap Singh I.

== Reign ==
His accession was opposed by Kesari Singh Sachan, a nephew of his father. British authorities, however, supported Jaswant's case. They appointed Musafir Makrani, who had been controlling the affairs of Alirajpur since 1817, as Manager of the State to manage state affairs until Jaswant came of age.

== Death and aftermath ==
He died on 17 March 1862. He left behind a will by which the State was to be divided equally between his sons, Ganga Deo and Rup Deo. The Government of India, after consulting the neighbouring chiefs, set aside the will and decided that Ganga Deo, his eldest son, would succeed him as Rana of Alirajpur and made suitable provisions for Rup Deo, his youngest son.
