= Ganga Deo =

Rana of Alirajpur from 1862 to 1871

- Rana

Rana of Alirajpur
- Reign: 1862 – 1871
- Predecessor: Jaswant Singh
- Successor: Rup Deo
- House: Alirajpur
- Dynasty: Rathore
- Father: Jaswant Singh

Ganga Deo was the Rana of Alirajpur from 1862 until his deposition in 1871.

== Reign ==
His father, Jaswant Singh, who died in 1862, had left behind a will according to which the state of Alirajpur was to be divided equally between him and his brother, Rup Deo. To decide whether the will was to be acted upon, the Government of India consulted with neighboring Ruling Chiefs and decided that it should be set aside. It was decided that Ganga Deo is the heir to the deceased and should succeed to the chiefship while suitable provision should be made for Rup Deo. Accordingly, he was installed as the Rana of Alirajpur. On his succession, the Government of India conferred upon him a dress of honor, and he presented them with a nazrana of 1,500 rupees.

== Deposition ==
He was deposed for incompetency in 1869 and the state was placed under the superintendence of Muhammad Najab Khan. He was granted an allowance of 1,000 Rs. per month for his maintenance.

== Death ==
He died in March 1871. Upon his death, his younger brother, Rup Deo, succeeded to his titles.
