= Bhopawar Agency =

Sub-agency of British India

Coordinates: 22°55′N 75°15′E

- Sub-agency of the Central India Agency
- 1882–1937
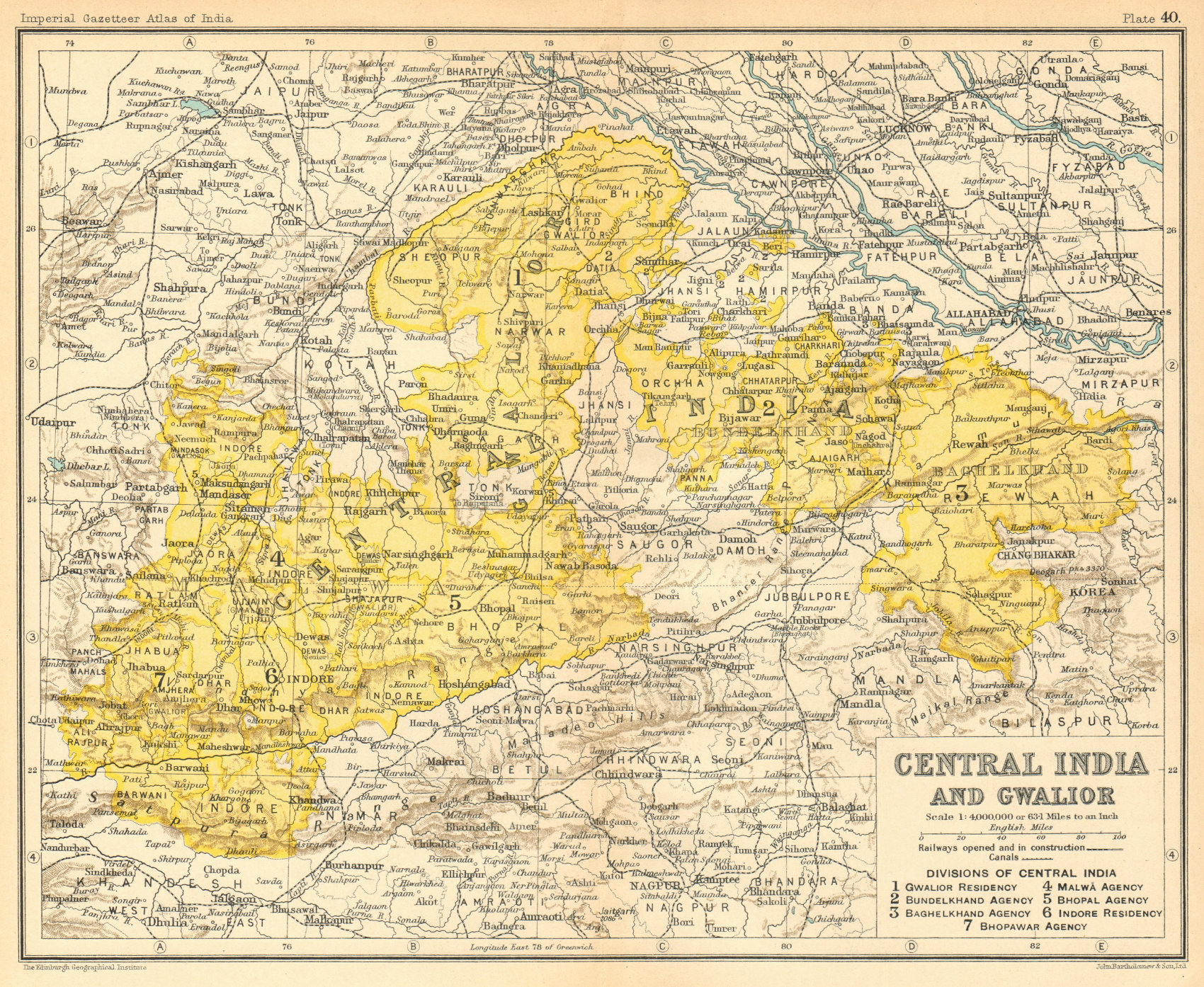
- Map of the Central India Agency with the Bhopawar Agency located at its western end
- Area
  - 1901: 19,902 km^{2} (7,684 sq mi)
- Population
  - 1901: 547,546
- History
  - Merger of Bhil Agency and Bhil Sub-agency: 1882
  - Merger into Malwa Agency: 1937
| Preceded by | Succeeded by |
| Bhil Agency | Malwa Agency |
- This article incorporates text from a publication now in the public domain: Chisholm, Hugh, ed. (1911). "Bhopawar". Encyclopædia Britannica (11th ed.). Cambridge University Press.

Bhopawar Agency was a sub-agency of the Central India Agency in British India with the headquarters at the town of Bhopawar, so the name. Bhopawar Agency was created in 1882 from a number of princely states in the Western Nimar and Southern Malwa regions of Central India belonging to the former Bhil Agency and Bhil Sub-agency with the capitals at Bhopawar and Manpur. The agency was named after Bhopawar, a village in Sardarpur tehsil, Dhar District of present-day Madhya Pradesh state. Manpur remained a strictly British territory.

The other chief towns of this region were: Badnawar, Kukshi, Manawar and Sardarpur, Chadawad Estate, Dattigaon. The mighty Vindhya and Satpura ranges crossed the territory of the agency roughly from east to west, with the fertile valley of the Narmada River lying between them. The agency also included the "Bhil Country", inhabited by the Bhil people.

== History ==
At the time of its 1882 establishment, the agency had a total area of 7,684 square miles (19,900 km^{2}), and its population was 547,546 according to the 1901 census. In 1904 certain districts were transferred from this agency to the Indore Residency, created in 1899, and the area of Bhopawar was thus reduced by 3,283 square miles (8,500 km^{2}).

In 1925 Bhopawar Agency was merged into Malwa Agency, and in 1927 the agency was renamed the Malwa-Bhopawar States Agency, which was renamed again as the Malwa Agency in 1934.

After Indian Independence in 1947, the rulers of the princely states within Malwa-Bhopawar Agency acceded to the Union of India, and the region became part of the new state of Madhya Bharat. Madhya Bharat was merged into Madhya Pradesh on 1 November 1956.

== Princely states and their feudatory estates ==
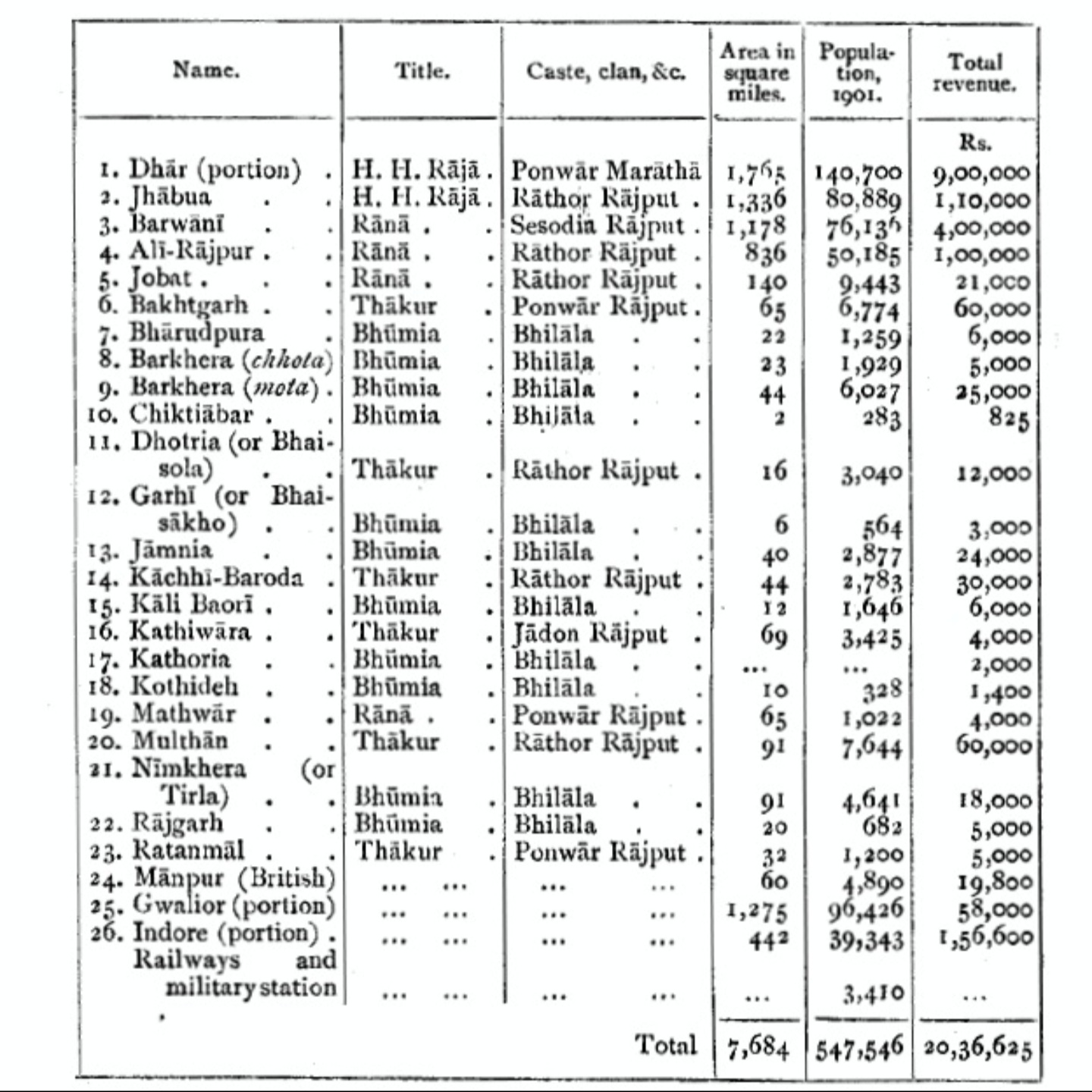
Bhopawar Agency Information

=== Salute States ===
Salute states in the agency, by precedence, with their feudatories :

1. Dhar, title Maharaja, Hereditary salute of 15-guns
2. Alirajpur, title Raja, Hereditary salute of 11-guns
  - including the extinct State of Phulmaal, which was incorporated into it earlier as well as Fiefs (Jagirs)
  1. Ondhwa
  2. Sondhwa.
3. Barwani, title Maharana, Hereditary salute of 11-guns
4. Jhabua, title Raja, Hereditary salute of 11-guns (till 1927, later shifted to (Malwa Agency)

=== Non-salute states ===
Minor and petty Princely states in the agency included (alphabetically, with their feudatories) :

1. Amjhera, title Rao
2. Bakhatgarh
3. Chhadawad, title Rao
4. Jobat, title Raja
5. Kathiwara, title Thakur
6. Mathwar, title Rana
7. Multhan.
8. Ratanmal, title Thakur.
9. in Indore State Territory's few enclaves like - Petlawad Tehsil, Dahi Jagir etc.
10. also including around about seventeen Feudal lords (Jagirdars) who paid direct tribute to Indore Durbar .

Further estates, not named above, include :

== External links and Sources ==
- Dictionaries of South Asia Library, Chicago University
