= Bidwal =

Village in Madhya Pradesh, India

Coordinates: 22°50′36″N 75°11′27″E

Bidwal (Hindi बिडवाल) is a village and former jagir (feudal estate) in Madhya Pradesh, western India.

The village is in Badnawar Mandal (21 km (13 mi) from the seat Badnawar), in Dhar District (30 km (19 mi) distance from seat Dhar) in Madhya Pradesh (232 km (144 mi) from state capital Bhopal. Other villages near Bidwal are Kod (4.7 km (2.9 mi)), Indrawal (5.7 km (3.5 mi)), Karod Kalan (6.4 km (4.0 mi)), Gajnod (7.1 km (4.4 mi)), Kanvan (8 km (5.0 mi)); towns near Tirla (30.2 km (18.8 mi)) and Sardarpur (32.2 km (20.0 mi)).

== History ==
The jagir was a Hindu thakorate and a Rajput thikana of the Maratha princely state of Dhar State. It was founded by Thakur Fateh Singh, younger brother of Raja Ratan Singh of Ratlam State, a Rathore Rajput of the Fatehsinghaut clan. The estate consisted of eight villages in the Badnawar pargana, yielding an annual revenue of 51,000 Rupees in 1928. The current head of Bidwal Royal family is Thakur Narendra Singh.
