= Jhabbu Nayak =

Jhabbu Nayak was founder of Jhabua dynasty in 1584. He was a freebooter belong to Labana community. Nayak and his people rose in mutiny against Mughal emperor in 1605. Keshav Das, from Mughal side, led Mughal army and attacked Jhabbu Nayak's army, where Jhabbu got killed. Keshaw Das named this conquered territory as Jhabua.
