= Rup Deo =

Rana of Alirajpur from 1871 to 1881

Rana Rup Deo
- Rana

Rana of Alirajpur
- Reign: 1871 – 1881
- Predecessor: Rana Ganga Deo
- Successor: Rana Bijai Singh
- Born: 1847
- Died: 29 October 1881 (aged 33–34)
- Issue: Baiji Ratan Kanwarji m.to HH Maharana Gambhir Sinhji Vairisal Sinhji of Rajpipla State; Baiji Himmat Kanwarji m.to HH Maharawal Pratap Sinhji Gulab Sinhji of Bansda State; Baiji (name unknown) m.to Yuvraj Madhav Sinhji Bechar Sinhji of Chuda State
- House: Alirajpur
- Dynasty: Rathore
- Father: Jaswant Singh

Rana Rup Dev (or Roop Deo) was the Rathore-Rajput ruler of one of its early sub-clan of Alirajpur State from the year 1871 until his death in 1881.He died without a male issue and was thus therefore succeeded by a distant kin Bijai Singh.

== Early life and career ==
When his father, Jaswant Singh, died in 1862, he left behind a will stating that the state of Alirajpur was to be divided equally between his sons, Ganga Deo and Rup Deo. However, the will was not followed, and the Government of India decided that Ganga Deo should succeed to his father's titles, while suitable provisions would be made for Rup Deo. Accordingly, arrangements were made. When his eldest brother was deposed in 1869 and Alirajpur was placed under superintendence, he was given a role in the administration. It was done to ensure he was properly trained for the duties that would devolve upon him when he succeeded his brother.

== Succession ==
Upon the death of Ganga Deo in 1871, he succeeded him as the Rana of Alirajpur.

== Reign ==
At the time of his succession, the Government of India decided to make no changes to the existing administration until Rup proved his ability to efficiently fulfill the responsibilities of governance. In 1873, he was granted administrative powers with the condition that his continuation in power would rely on his effectiveness in managing the administration.

== Death ==
He died without any issue in 1881. His death led to a succession dispute in Alirajpur which was resolved when the Government of India selected Bijai Singh as his successor.
