= Shyam Chandra =

Raja of Nilgiri (1893-1913)

Shyam Chandra Mardraj Harichandan
- Raja

Raja of Nilgiri
- Reign: 11 May 1893 – 6 July 1913
- Predecessor: Krishna Chandra Mardraj Harichandan
- Successor: Kishore Chandra Mardraj Harichandan
- Born: 6 January 1877
- Died: 6 July 1913 (aged 36)
- Issue Detail: Kishore Chandra Mardraj Harichandan; Basant Manjari Devi
- House: Mayurbhanj (by birth); Nilgiri (by adoption)
- Father: Krishna Chandra Bhanj Deo (biological); Krishna Chandra Mardraj Harichandan (adoptive)
- Education: St. Paul's School, Darjeeling

Shyam Chandra Mardraj Harichandan was the Raja of Nilgiri from 1893 until his death in 1913.

== Early life, education, and family ==
He was born on 6 January 1877 to Krishna Chandra Bhanj Deo, the Maharaja of Mayurbhanj. He was adopted in 1882 by Krishna Chandra Mardraj Harichandan, the Raja of Nilgiri, as his son and heir. He was educated at St. Paul's School, Darjeeling. He married and had issue: one son, Kishore Chandra Mardraj Harichandan, and one daughter, Basant Manjari Devi.

== Reign ==
He acceded to the Nilgiri throne upon the death of his adoptive father on 11 May 1893. Owing to his minority on the occasion, the state was placed under the administration of the British Government. He was invested with administrative powers in 1898. He was temporarily deprived of his powers in 1905 due to his complicity in a case of torture in his state. The administration of the state was restored to him in 1908.

== Death ==
He died on 6 July 1913 and was succeeded by Kishore Chandra Mardraj Harichandan in his title, rank, and dignity.
