= Gopal Mandir Jhabua =

Hindu temple in Jhabua, Madhya Pradesh

Gopal Mandir
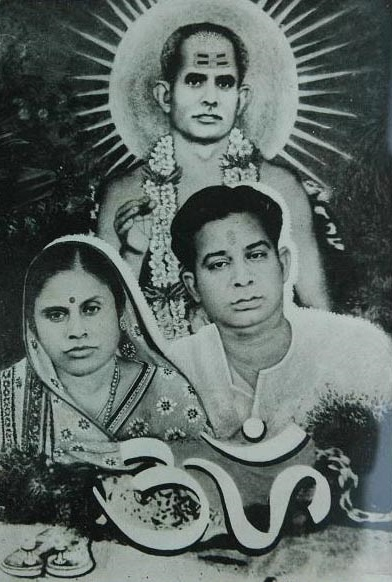
- Gopal Mandir in Jhabua

- Location within Madhya Pradesh

Religion
- Affiliation: Hinduism
- District: Jhabua district

Location
- Location: Gopal Colony, Jhabua
- State: Madhya Pradesh
- Country: India
- Coordinates: 22.7628°N 74.5967°E

Architecture
- Established: 1970

Gopal Mandir is a Hindu temple and religious institution situated in Gopal Colony in Jhabua, Madhya Pradesh, India. The temple is associated with Ramshankar Jani, Ghanshyam Jani and Ravikantaben Jani, who are referred to by followers as Bade Bapji, Chhote Bapji and Gopal Prabhu respectively.

== History ==
According to a 2024 report published by Dainik Jagran, the temple was constructed in 1970. The report states that Vishwanath Trivedi, also known as Mota Bhai, played an important role in its construction along with members of the devotees' group and the trust. A trust was subsequently formed for the administration of the temple.

== Religious and cultural activities ==
The temple holds regular religious programmes. Dainik Jagran reported that a morning aarti is conducted at 9:30 a.m. and an evening devotional singing programme is held from 8:00 p.m.

An annual religious festival is organised in May. According to Dainik Jagran, the festival lasts four days and includes temple decoration, devotional programmes and a community meal. Local news reports have also covered religious gatherings and anniversary celebrations organised at the temple.

In August 2022, Rajasthan Patrika organised a discussion concerning the 75th anniversary of Indian independence in the Gopal Mandir premises. Participants discussed national unity, the meaning of independence and their memories of the independence movement.

== Educational and cultural institutions ==
The temple complex includes the Shri Gopal Vachanalaya, a library containing approximately 20,000 books on religion, culture, history and literature.

The complex also includes Shri Gopal Shishu Vidya Mandir, a school providing education for children from Classes 1 to 5.

== Online religious services ==
In 2019, Dainik Bhaskar reported that live viewing of activities at Gopal Mandir had been made available through mobile devices.

== Location and access ==
The temple is located in Gopal Colony in the central part of Jhabua. Jhabua is the administrative headquarters of Jhabua district in western Madhya Pradesh.

The nearest railway station is Meghnagar railway station, approximately 15 kilometres from Jhabua. Indore is approximately 150 kilometres from Jhabua and is connected to the town by road.
