= Dr. A. P. J. Abdul Kalam University Institute of Technology =

College in Madhya Pradesh

Dr. APJ Abdul Kalam University Institute of Technology
- Former name: UIT Jhabua
- Motto: प्रज्ञानं ब्रह्म (prajñânam brahmah) (Sanskrit)
- Motto in English: Consciousness is the Ultimate
- Type: Public
- Established: 2015
- Affiliations: RGPV
- Undergraduates: 120
- Location: Village Gadwada, Umari Road, Jhabua (M.P.) - 457661, Jhabua, Madhya Pradesh, India; 22.7566257°N 74.6286847°E
- Campus: Rural, 36 acres
- Acronyms: UIT-RGPV JHABUA
- Website: uitjhabua.rgpv.ac.in

Dr. APJ Abdul Kalam UIT Jhabua, popularly known as UIT Jhabua, is a public (government) college in Jhabua, Madhya Pradesh, India. The institution was established by the government of Madhya Pradesh with the name UIT Jhabua. It is a constituent institution of Rajiv Gandhi Proudyogiki Vishwavidyalaya (RGPV), Bhopal, established in 2015.

The institute's campus is located at Village Gadwada, Umari Road, Jhabua, Madhya Pradesh 457661, India.

== History ==
To address the growing need for engineering expertise, the government of Madhya Pradesh established UIT Jhabua in 2015. From 2015 to 2023, the institute operated from the campus of Government Polytechnic College, Kishanpuri, Jhabua. In 2024, the institute shifted to its present campus at Village Gadwada on Umari Road, Jhabua.

The institute initially offered Bachelor of Technology (B.Tech.) programmes in Computer Science, Engineering and Mechanical Engineering. The institute was renamed after former president Dr. A. P. J. Abdul Kalam by the government.

The institute's current campus is situated at Village Gadwada on Umari Road in Jhabua.

== Courses offered ==
=== Undergraduate courses ===
The institute offers undergraduate Bachelor of Technology (B.Tech.) programmes in the following fields:

Branch	Total Seats	Year of commencement
Computer Science and Engineering	60	2015
Mechanical Engineering	60	2015

== Campus ==
The institute's campus is situated in Village Gadwada on Umari Road in Jhabua, Madhya Pradesh. The campus is around 36 acres in area.

The campus facilities include an all-weather approach road, potable water supply, a students' common room, separate hostel facilities for boys and girls, a computer laboratory, library and e-library, high-speed internet facilities, smart classrooms and sports facilities.
