= Bakhatgarh =

Indian town in Dhar, Madyha Pradesh

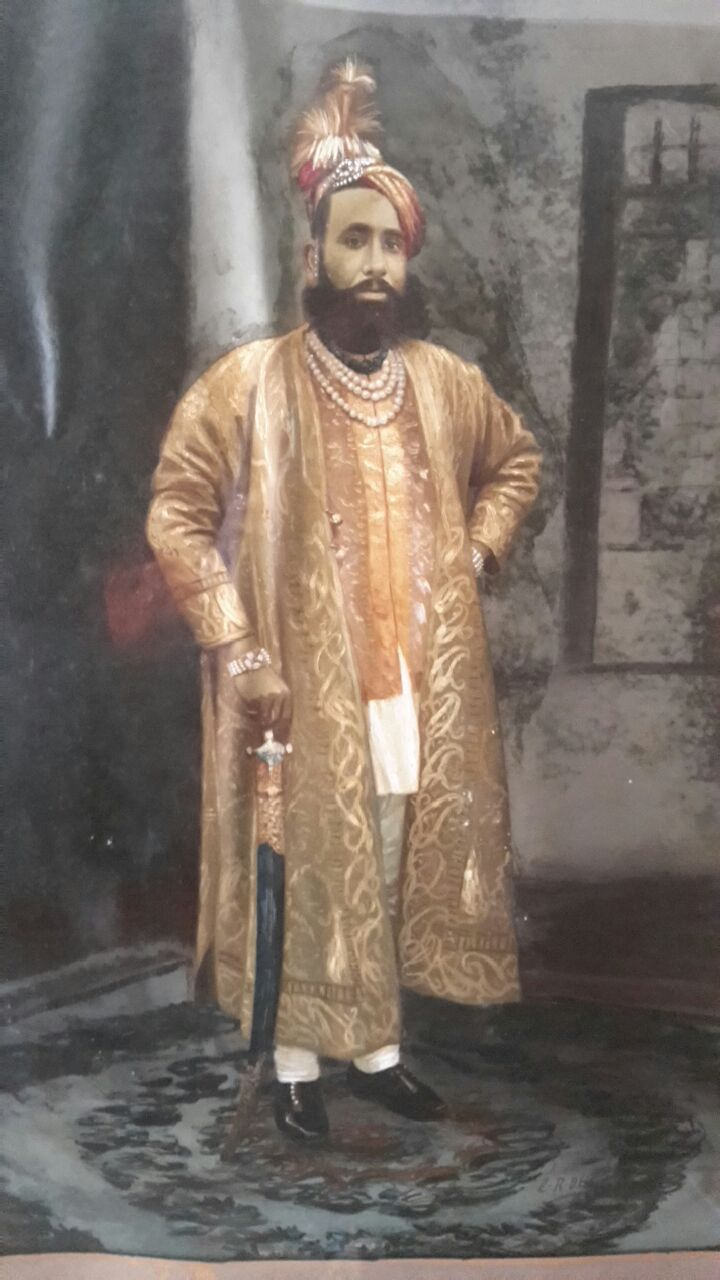
Rao Bahadur Rao Shree Sardar Singh of Bakhatgarh State.

Bakhatgarh is a town and former princely state in the Dhar district, Madhya Pradesh, India. The royal family of Bakhatgarh (a prominent parmar clan of Malwa, and perhaps the oldest) belongs to Mahipawat sub-clan of Paramara Rajputs. They are descendants of King Bhoja.

== History ==
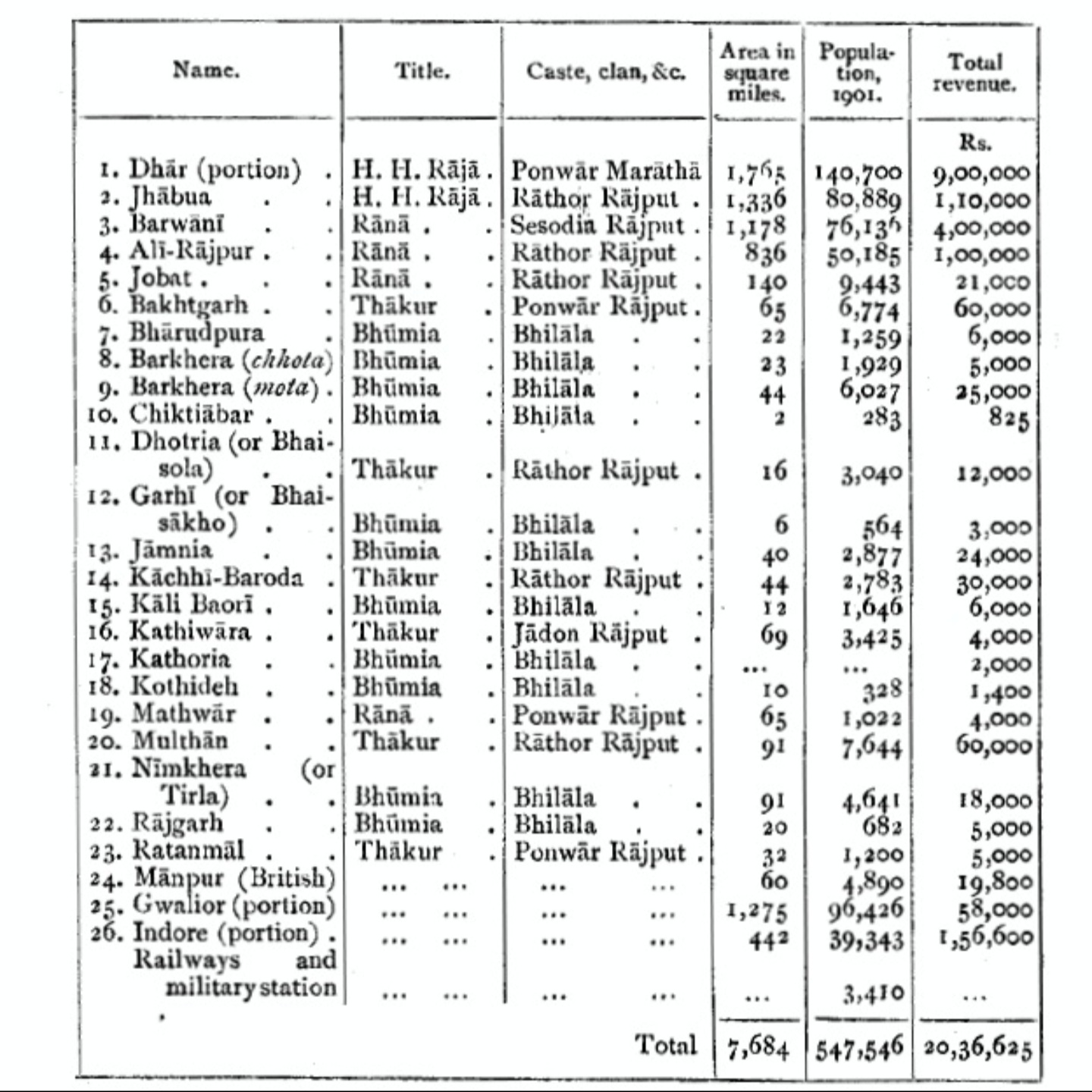
Bhopawar Agency Information

The princely state of Bakhatgarh was founded by Rao Nagmalji a Parmar rajput in 1395. The capital of the state was Pitgara until 1765 when Rao Bakhat singhji shifted the capital to the newly found village of Bakhatgarh. The Raos of Bakhatgarh were also the Mandloi of Badnawar pargana. The mandloiship of Badnawar was granted to Rao Daulat Singhji of Bakhatgarh by Mughal emperor. The state consist of 32 Istimirar villages, 3 Inam villages, 9 Khasgi villages (7 Badi Khasgi and 2 Choti Khasgi) and 27 hamlets.

The state had an area of 171 square kilometers and yielded a revenue of Rs 80,000 in 1915.

During British Raj, the Badnawar pargana consisted of 158 villages of which 101 were guaranteed, 23 were khalsa villages, and the remaining 34 were alienated to non-guaranteed thakurats. The Chief of Bakhatgarh, who was also the mandloi of Badnawar, was entitled to collect dami from all guaranteed and non-guaranteed Thakurs of Badnawar as appertain to his zamindaree right (Mandloiship).

== Rulers ==
1. Rao Nagmalji

2. Rao Dungar Singhji

3. Rao Kadal Singhji

4. Rao Roop Singhji

5. Rao Haapa Singhji

6. Rao Hamirdev Singhji

7. Rao Khem Singhji

8. Rao seetal Singhji

9. Rao Sangram Singhji

10. Rao Nano Singhji

11. Rao Bajey Singhji

12. Rao Jai Singhji

13. Rao Akheerdasji

14. Rao Daulat Singhji

15. Rao Bakhat Singhji

16. Rao Bhop Singhji

17. Rao Prithvi Singhji

18. Rao Sawai Singhji

19. Rao Bhagwat Singhji

20. Rao Pratap Singhji

21. Rao Bahadur Rao Sardar Singhji

22. Rao Rai Singhji
