= Nilgiri State =

Coordinates: 23.46°N 86.77°E

Nilagiri State
- Princely State of British India
- 1521–1948
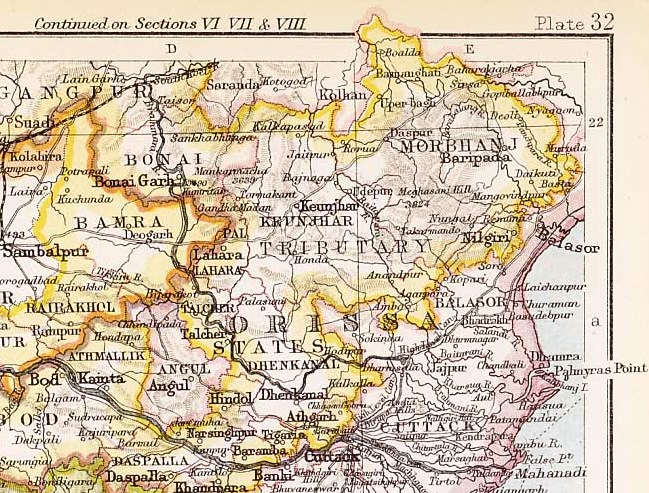
- Nilagiri State in the Imperial Gazetteer of India
- Capital: Nilagiri
- Area
  - 1931: 723 km^{2} (279 sq mi)
- History
  - Established: 1521
  - Accession to the Union of India: 1948
Succeeded by
India

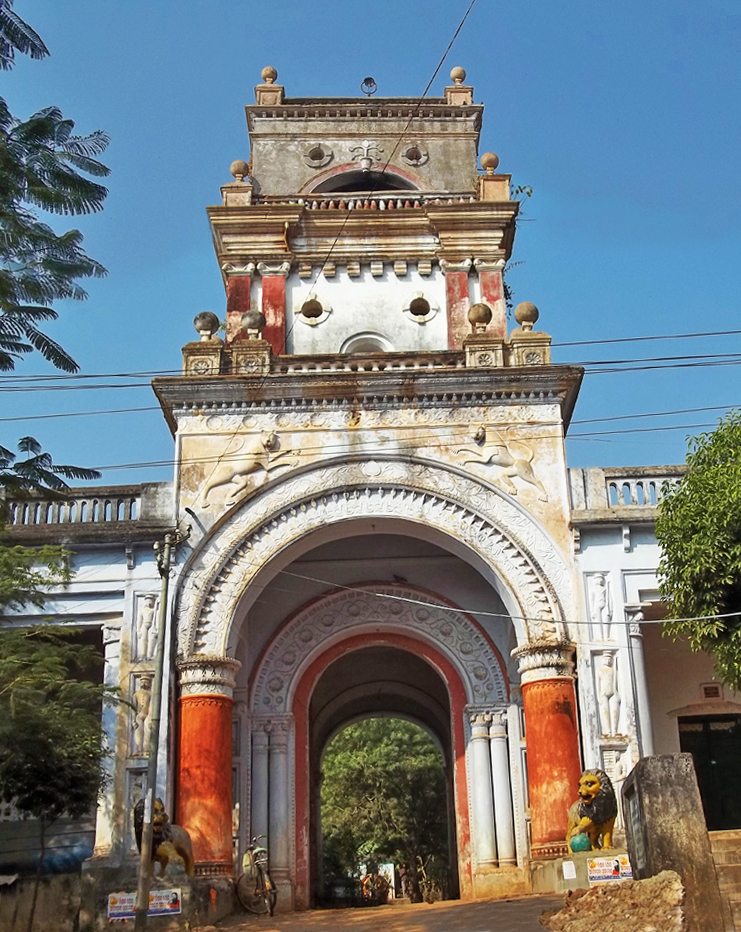
Palace gate of the Niligiri Rajas in Nilagiri.

Nilagiri State was one of the princely states of India during the British Raj. It belonged to the Orissa States Agency and its capital was at Raj Nilgiri, which later became the modern town of Nilagiri.

The state was bounded in the north and west by the State of Mayurbhanj and in the south by Balasore District. As of 1940, Nilgiri State had a population of 73,109 and an area of 263 square miles (680 km^{2}). In 1949 it was merged into Balasore District.

== History ==
Historical population
Year	Pop.	±%
1872	33,944	—
1881		—
1891	56,198	—
1901	66,460	+18.3%
1911	68,724	+3.4%
1921	65,239	−5.1%
1931	68,593	+5.1%

According to local traditions, Nilgiri state was founded by a mythical ancestor coming from the Chhota Nagpur region of the Nagabanshi dynasty. In 1525 Raja Narayan Singh distinguished himself by his service to Emperor Akbar in the battles against Afghan invaders. Between 1611 and 1797, there were seven successive rulers. Raja Krishnachandra Mardraj Harichandan, who ruled Nilgiri in 1850s, adopted the son of the Bhanj king of Mayurbhanj, Krishna Chandra Bhanj Deo, who succeeded as the ruler of Nilgiri as Raja Shyamchandra Mardraj Harichandan in 1893.

During the time of the political integration of India freedom fighters such as Balaram Raj, Shyamsundar Parida, Kailashchandra Mohanty, Banamali Das, Baishnab Patnaik and Nanda Kishore Patnaik forced the last Raja of Nilgiri, Kishor Chandra, to surrender to the newly formed Indian National Government. The prince signed the instrument of accession to the Indian Union on 1 January 1948.

== Rulers ==
The rulers of Nilgiri State. They bore the title of 'Raja', 'Rani' in the case of female ruler Chira Devi.

1. Bhanukaran Birat Bhujanga Mandhata (1125–1143)
2. Sasikaran Birat Bhujanga Mandhata (1143–1167)
3. Charribrana Birar Bhujanga Mandhara (1167–1208)
4. Kalakar Birar Bhujanga Mandhara (1208–1249)
5. Sadhukar Birat Bhujanga Mandhata (1249–1329)
6. Dinaram Birat Bhujanga Mandhata (1329–1341)
7. Chunusaha Birat Bhujanga Mandhata (1341–1363)
8. Nounsaha Birat Bhujanga Mandhata (1363–1381)
9. Biraliswar Birat Bhujanga Mandhata (1381–1414)
10. Dibya Singh Birat Bhujanga Mandhata (1414–1450)
11. Janardan Birat Bhujanga Mandhata (1450–1486)
12. Jagannath Birat Bhujanga Mandhata (1486–1520)
13. Narayan Basanr Birat Bhujanga Mandhata Harichandan (1520–1564)
14. Utreswar Harichandan Birat Bhujanga Mandhata (Satuda Behuda Bhuyan Mohapatra) (1564–1610)
15. Ramkrushna Das Harichandan Mardraj (1610–1633)
16. Gopinarh Das Harichandan Mardraj (1633–1664)
17. Lukhyan Das Harichandan Mardraj (1664–1695)
18. Goinda Das Mardraj Harichandan (1695–1712)
19. Narayan Das Mardraj Harichandan (1712 :6 months)
20. Chakradhar Mardraj Harichandan (1712–1741)
21. Tribikram Mardraj Harichandan (1741–1742)
22. Raghunath Mardraj Harichandan (1742–1752)
23. Nayanund Mardraj Harichandan (1752–1753)
24. Oebya Singh Mardraj Harichandan (1753–1771)
25. Ncryanund Mardraj Harichandan (1771–1774)
26. Sarveswar Mardraj Harichandan (1774–1778)
27. Lakshmikama Mardraj Harichandan (1778–1780)
28. Radhika Dei Rajmata (1780–1781)
29. Dasarath Mardraj Ilarichandan (1781–1784)
30. Govardhan Mardraj Harichandan (1784–1795)
31. Gopinath Mardraj Harichandan (1795–1796)
32. Ramchandra Mardraj Harichandan (1796 (15 days))
33. Darathi Mardraj Harichandan (1796–1799)
34. Ramchandra Mardraj Harichandan (1799–1801)
35. Gopinarh Mardraj Harichandan (1801–1802)
36. Ramchandra Mardraj Harichandan (1802–1819)
37. Gobinda Chandra Mardraj Harichandan (1819–1832)
  - Rani Chira Devi - Regent (1833-1843)
38. Krishna Chandra Mardraj Harichandan (1843–1893)
39. Shyam Chandra Mardraj Harichandan (1893 – 6 Jul 1913)
40. Kishor Chandra Mardraj Harichandan (6 July 1913 – 1 January 1948)

=== Titular ===
- Kishor Chandra Mardraj Harichandan (1 January 1948 – 29 March 1960)
- Rajendra Chandra Mardraj Harichandan (29 March 1960 – 30 May 2001)
- Jayant Chandra Mardraj Harichandan (30 May 2001 – current)
