= Alirajpur State =

Princely state of India

Coordinates: 22°18′19″N 74°21′9″E

Alirajpur State अलीराजपुर रियासत
- Princely State of British India
- 1437–1948
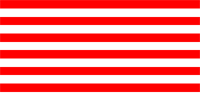
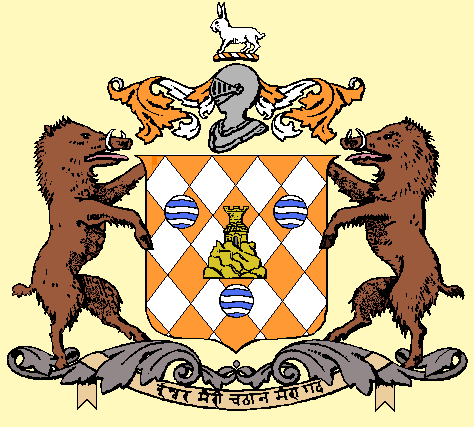
- Flag Coat of arms

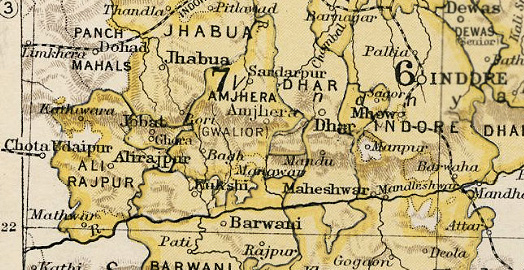
- Alirajpur State in the Imperial Gazetteer of India
- Capital: Alirajpur
- Area
  - 1941: 2,165.24 km^{2} (836.00 sq mi)
- Population
  - 1941: 112,754
- History
  - Established: 1437
  - Accession of Dominion of India: 1948
Succeeded by
India
- Today part of: Madhya Pradesh, Republic of India

Alirajpur State was formerly a princely state of India, administratively under the Bhopawar Agency subdivision of the Central India Agency. The state covered an area of 2165 square kilometres, with a population of 50,185 in 1901 and its capital at Alirajpur. The average revenue of the state was Rs.100,000 in 1901.

== History ==
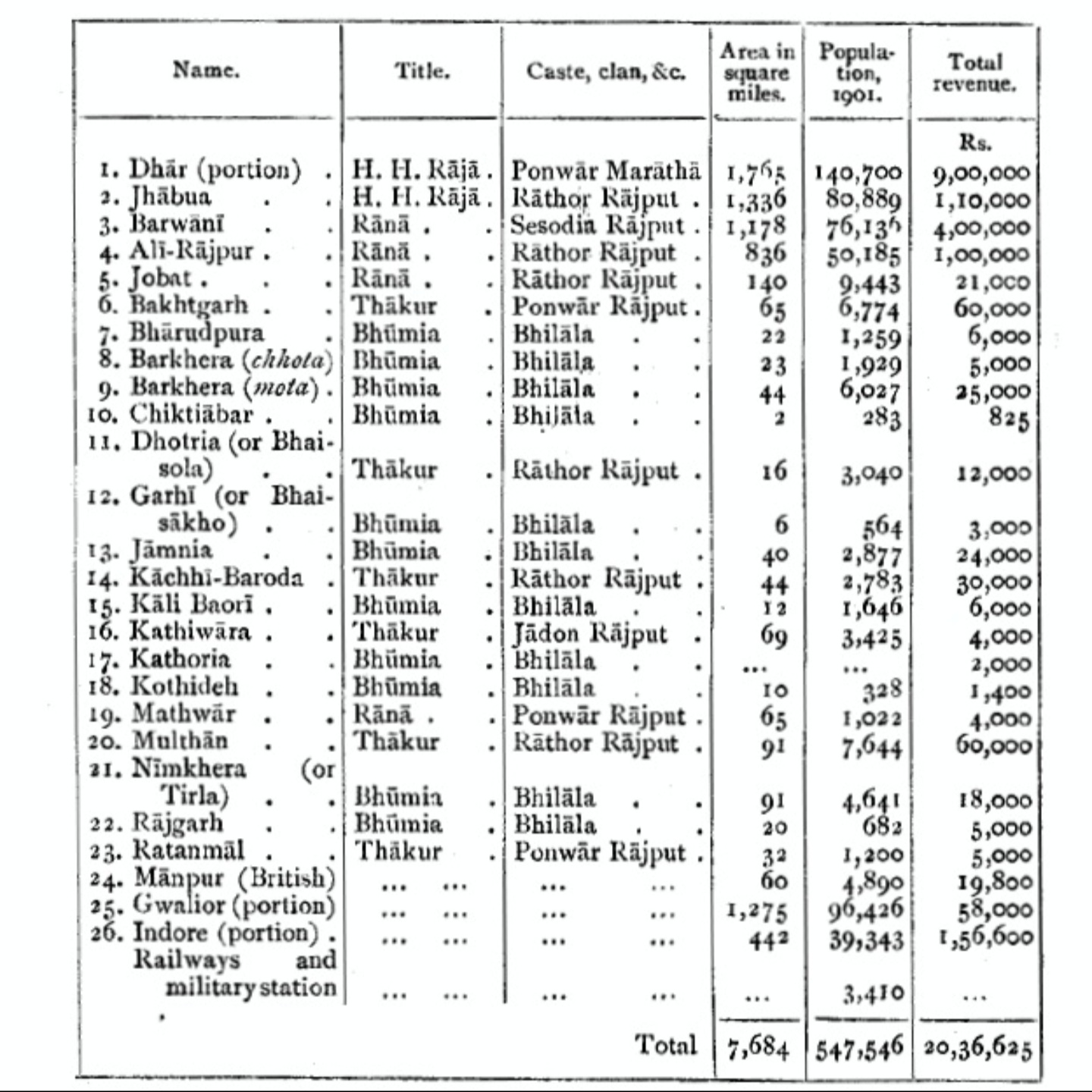
Bhopawar Agency Information

The early history of the state is not very clear, the founder of the state was either Anand Deo or Ude Deo. The state got its name from the fort of Ali and the capital of Rajpur. The rulers of Alirajpur claim to be Rathore's from the royal family of Jodhpur, however this claim is not accepted by the Maharaja's of Jodhpur. The state came under British rule in 1817. The last ruler of Ali Rajpur was Surendra Singh, who subsequently served as the Ambassador of India to Spain in the 1980s. After Indian independence in 1947, Alirajpur acceded to the Union of India, and the principality was incorporated into the new state of Madhya Bharat, which subsequently became Madhya Pradesh state on 1 November 1956.

The state flag consisted of 12 red and white horizontal stripes. The Raja had a personal flag with five stripes of different colors.

Alirajpur State is the birthplace of the Indian revolutionary from the Indian struggle against the British Rule, Chandra Shekhar Azad.

=== Rulers ===
==== Ranas ====
- 1437–1440: Anand Deo (d. 1440)
- 1440–....: Pratap Deo
- .... - .... Chanchal Deo
- .... - .... Gugal Deo
- .... - .... Bachchharaj Deo
- .... - .... Dip Deo
- .... - .... Pahad Deo I
- .... - .... Udai Deo
- .... - 1765 Pahad Deo II (d. 1765)
- 1765 - 1818 Pratap Singh I (d. 1818)
- 1818 Musafir Makrani
- 1818 - 17 Mar 1862 Jashwant Singh (usurper) (b. 1818 - d. 1862)
- 1818 - 1839 Musafir Makrani -Manager
- 1862 - 1869 Ganga Deo (b. c.1845 - d. 1871)
- 1871 - 29 Oct 1881 Rup Deo (b. 1847 - d. 1881)
- 1869 - 1873 Muhammad Najaf Khan -Superintendent
- Shamsuddin Makrani Superintendent of Police alirajpur State
- 1881 - 16 Aug 1890 Bijai Singh (b. 1881 - d. 1890)
- 16 Aug 1890 – 14 Feb 1891 Interregnum
- 14 Feb 1891 - 1911 Pratap Singh II (b. 1881 - d. af. 1950) (installed Mar 1892)

==== Rajas ====
- 1911 - 1941 Pratap Singh II (s.a.) (from 3 Jun 1933, Sir Pratap Singh II)(personal style of Maharaja from 1941)
- 1941 - 23 Oct 1941 Fateh Singh (b. 1904 - d. 1941)
- 23 Oct 1941 – 15 Aug 1947 Surendra Singh (b. 1923 - d. 1996)
- 23 Oct 1941 – 15 Aug 1947 Sir Pratap Singh -Regent (s.a.)

== See also ==
- Bhopawar Agency
- Political integration of India
- Chandra Shekhar Azad
