= Badnawar =

Town in Dhar (Madhya Pradesh), India

Badnawar Budnavar
- Town
- Location in Madhya Pradesh, India Badnawar (India)
- Coordinates: 23.02°N 75.22°E
- Country: India
- State: Madhya Pradesh
- District: Dhar
- Elevation: 506 m (1,660 ft)

Population (2011)
  - Total: 20,928

Languages
  - Official: Hindi
- Time zone: UTC+5:30 (IST)
- PIN: 454660
- Telephone code: 07295
- ISO 3166 code: IN-MP
- Vehicle registration: MP 11 XX XXXX
- Website: no official website

Badnawar (or Badnavar) is a Town, former pargana and a Nagar Parishad of the Dhar district in the state of Madhya Pradesh, India. This is a tehsil place having 170 villages. Badnawar is around 95 km from Indore - the business capital of Madhya Pradesh.

in AD 783. It remained a major Jain center until mid 13th century.

== Schools ==
- Unnati public HS school
- Kashyap Vidhya Peeth
- K C Saraf Vidhyalaya
- Nandaram Chopra Higher Secondary School
- Unnati Academy
- Jagrati Vidhya Mandir
- Suraj Vidhya Vihar
- Shri Sardar Patel Vidhyapeeth
- Pratap Vidhya Niketan
- Shri Aaiji Public School
- Jain Public School

== Geography ==
Badnawar is located at 23.02°N 75.22°E. It has an average elevation of 506 metres (1,660 feet).

== History ==
Acharya Jinasena started the composition of Harivamsa Purana here in AD 783. Jayavarmadeva, A Paramara ruler, had issued a grant mentioning Vardhamanapur, which was found at Ujjain. Some of the ancient Jain images found here are now displayed in the Digambar Jain Museum Ujjain. Approximately twenty inscribed images have been found here that date from Samvat 1122 to 1308. Several of them mention Vardhanapur or Vardhamanapura as the name of the city and some mention a Jain community named Vardhamanapuranvaya (now called Badanera). Ancient Jain images continue to be found here.

There is a very ancient Dharmaraja temple here. There is an old Jinda Samadhi in the temple complex. There is a very old gymnasium in the temple complex.

Badnawar was a pargana given to Raja Rai Singh, second son of Maharaja Ratan Singh Rathore founder of Ratlam and governor of 16 parganas of north Malwa in 1658, before the fatel battle of Dharmat (Fatehibad near Ujjain) against Mughal Aurangzab where Ratan Singh Rathore was killed and Rai Singh escaped wounded, in 1733 it came under Maratha rule by the conquest of Malwa by Peshwa Bajirao. Badnavar fell under Dhar ruled by the Maratha Sardar Puar. In 1818 Raja Bhagwant Singh was compelled to move to Kachhi Baroda and a settlement was made by Sir John Malcome of the British East India Company. Badnawar region, included 4 prominent jagirs (feudatory (e)states), all held by Rajput: Bakhatgarh (35 villages) Multhan (29 villages), Kachhi Baroda (18 villages), Dotrea and Bidwal (eight villages).

== Demographics ==
As of 2011 India census, Badnawar has a population of 20,928. Males constitute 52.03% of the population and the females 47.97%. Badnawar has a literacy rate of 81.3%, with 88.7% of the males and 41% of females literate.
