= Kathiwara State =

Indian princely state

Coordinates: 22.48°N 74.15°E

Kathiwada State काठिवाडा रियासत
- Princely State of British India
- c. 1434–1948
- Area
  - 1901: 181 km^{2} (70 sq mi)
- Population
  - 1901: 3,425
- Government
- Thakur
  - ?-1865 CE: Thakur Zorawar Sinh (first)
  - 1903-1947 CE: Rana Thakur Sahib Onkar Sinh (last)
- History
  - Established: c. 1434
  - Independence of India: 1948
Succeeded by
India
- Today part of: India

Kathiwara State (Hindi: काठिवाडा) or Kathiwada State was a princely state ruled by the Jadon dynasty that encompassed about 181 square kilometres (70 sq mi) of the territory immediately surrounding the city of Kathiwara. The princely state acceded to India in 1947. Upon accession to the Indian Union, it was absorbed into the province of Madhya Bharat.

== History ==
The state's origins can be traced back to 1434, however, information about the country is scarce. The rulers carried the title Thakur; they were paid 4,000 rupees in revenue and 32,000 rupees as privy purse. It was ruled by the Jadon dynasty. Its last ruler, Onkar Sinh(ji) acceded the state to India in 1947.

=== Post-independence ===
After independence, it was merged into the province of Madhya Bharat, and was located right on the border with Bombay State. In 1993, Melange was founded as a clothing and fashion shop in Mumbai by Sangita Kathiwada, the wife of Rana Saheb Jayendra Sinh. This was closely followed by other projects, such as the Kathiwada Raaj Mahal (a hunting lodge commissioned by Onkar Sinh in 1895 and refurbished in 2007), the Kathiwada Arts, Circle 1434, and Kathiwada City House. The organizations remain a tourist and local attraction.

== List of Rulers ==
This is a list of the known rulers of Kathiwada. Information is only known from the reign of Zorawar Sinh.

- ?-1865: Thakur Zorawar Sinh
- 1865-1903: Thakur Bahadur Sinh- succeeded his brother Zorawar Sinh with the permission of the (British) Government of India.
- 1903-1947: Rana Thakur Sahib Onkar Sinh

Titular Rana Sahebs-

- 1947-1969: Rana Thakur Sahib Onkar Sinh
- 1969-2010: Rana Sahib Sri Jayendra Sinh
- 2010–present: Rana Sahib Sri Digvijay Sinh Kathiwada
