= Jhabua State =

Princely state of India

Coordinates: 22.77°N 74.6°E

- Princely State of British India
- 1584–1948
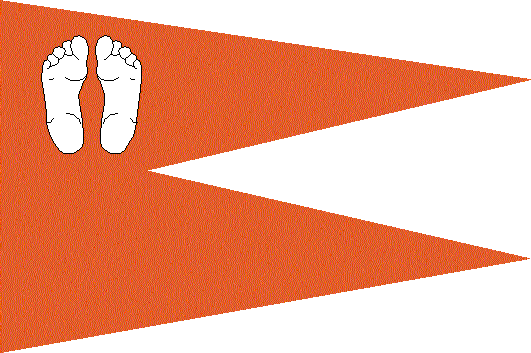
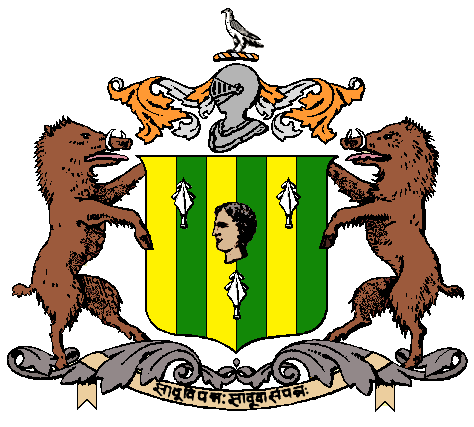
- Flag Coat of arms

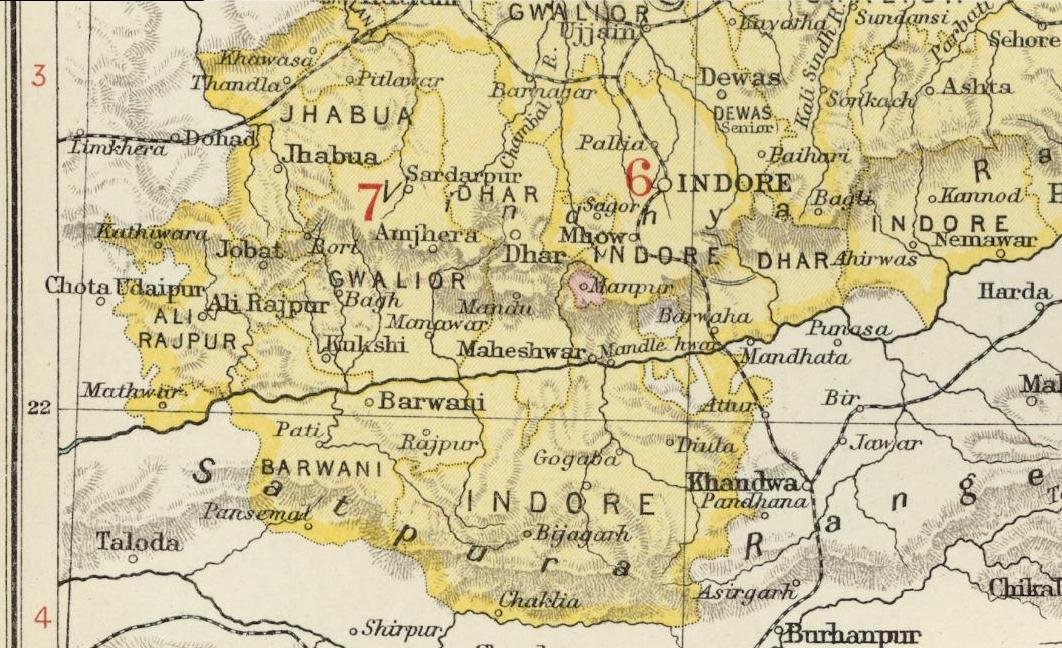
- Jhabua State in the Imperial Gazetteer of India
- Capital: Jhabua
- Area
  - 1901: 3,460 km^{2} (1,340 sq mi)
- Population
  - 1901: 80,889
- History
  - Established: 1584
  - Accession to the Union of India: 1948
Preceded by	Succeeded by
Mughal Empire	India

Jhabua State was one of the princely states of India during the period of the British Raj. It had its capital in Jhabua town. Most of the territory of the princely state was inhabited by the Bhil people, who constituted a majority of the population. The revenue of the state in 1901 was Rs.1,10,000.

== History ==
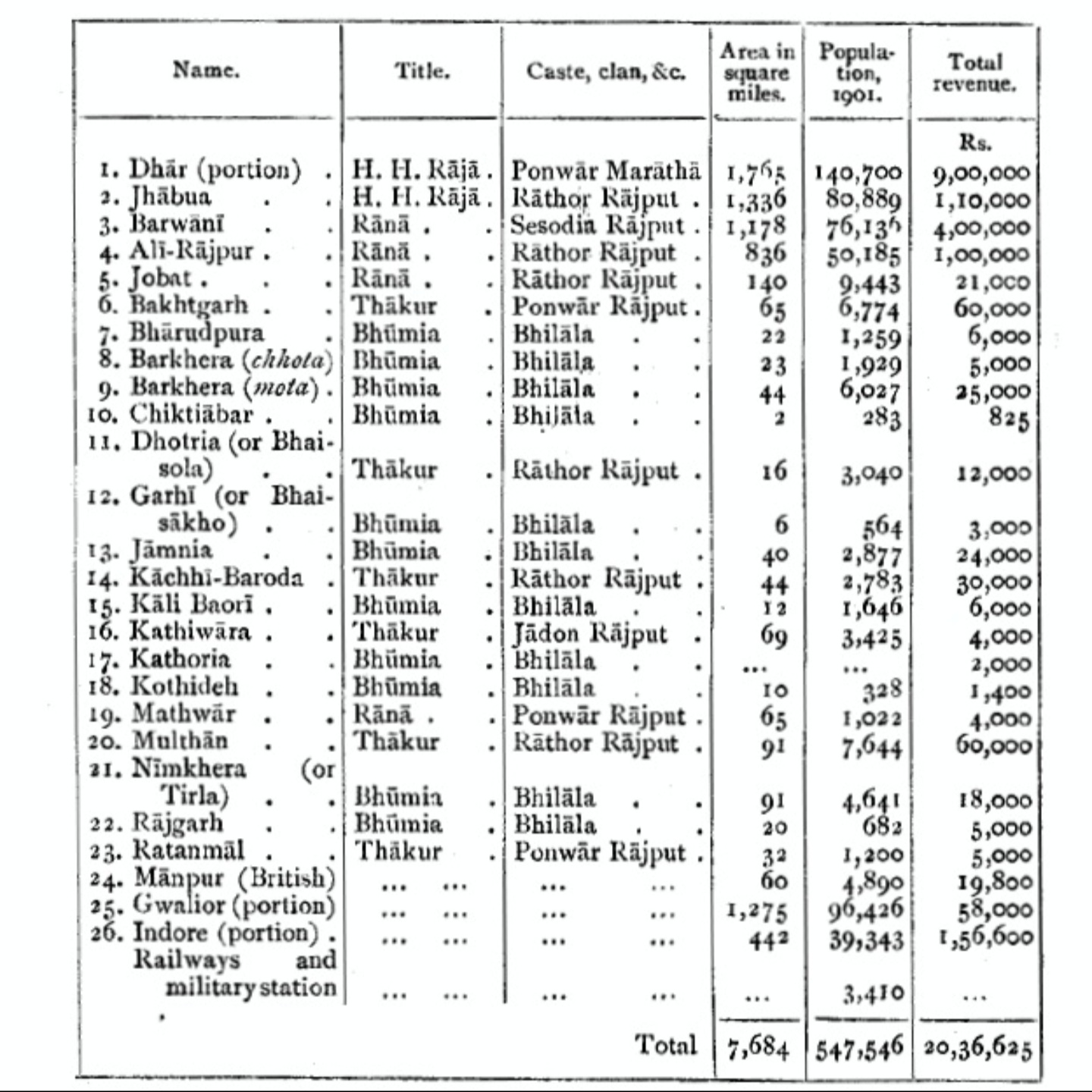
Bhopawar Agency Information

The state of Jhabua was founded by Kesho Das or Kishan Das, in 1584. He was granted the title of Raja by Mughal Emperor Akbar as a reward for a successful campaign in Bengal, and for punishing the Bhil Chiefs of Jhabua, who had murdered the wife and daughters of the Imperial Viceroy of Gujarat. Kesho Das was killed by his own son called Karan Singh which threw the state into disorder. After Karan, Man Singh became the raja and after Man, Khushal Singh was the ruler of Jhabua. During 1698, Khushal gave much of his lands to his brothers and sons and was too weak to rule his state effectively. This allowed the Marathas to actively invade Jhabua on a regular basis. Khushal's son Anup was assassinated after which his infant son Raja Shiv Singh succeeded him. Shiv was an infant and therefore the states administration during this time was managed by the raja's mother and the nobles. The Marathas under Holkar took advantage of this situation to take control of Jhabua. The threat from Jai Singh of Sailana forced the nobles of Jhabua to rely on Maratha protection, Holkar thus sent his officers to manage the states affairs. Jhabua later came under British protection in 1817 A.D. and was under the Bhopawar Agency of the Central India Agency and in 1927 it became part of the Malwa Agency.There were 20 families of rank in the state who paid £1500 to the Holkars and £2500 to their own chief. In 1875 the state had a population of 55,000 and a revenue of £22,500. After India's independence in 1947, Jhabua's last ruler signed the accession to the Indian Union on 15 June 1948, and Jhabua became part of the newly created Madhya Bharat state, which in 1956 was merged into Madhya Pradesh.

=== Rulers ===
The rulers of Jhabua were Rathor Rajputs. They had the title of H.H. Raja Saheb. They were granted a hereditary salute of 11 guns by the British.

Rajas

1584 – 1607	Raja Keshav Das
1607 – 1610	Raja Karan Singh
1610 – 1677	Raja Maha Singh
1677 – 1723	Raja Kushal Singh
1723 – 1727	Raja Anup Singh
1727 – 1758	Raja Sheo Singh	(d. 1758)
1758 – 1770	Raja Bahadur Singh
1770 – 1821	Raja Bhim Singh	(d. 1829)
1821 – 1832	Raja Pratap Singh	(d. 1832)
1832 – 1840	Raja Ratan Singh	(d. 1840)
Nov 1841 – 1895	HH Raja Sir Gopal Singh	(b. 1841 – d. 1895)
26 Apr 1895 – 1942	HH Raja Sir Udai Singh	(b. 1875 – d. af.1945)
1942 – 15 Aug 1947	HH Raja Sir Dilip Singh	(b. 1905 – d. 1965)

== See also ==
- Central India Agency
- Political integration of India
- Malwa Agency
