= Para, Jhabua =

Para पारा
- Location in Madhya Pradesh, India
- Coordinates: 22.644°N 74.659°E
- Country: India
- State: Madhya Pradesh
- District: Jhabua district

Population (2011)
  - Total: 3,734

Language
  - Official: Hindi
- Time zone: UTC+5:30 (IST)

Para is a village in Madhya Pradesh state of India.
