= Malwa Agency =

Administrative section of British India's Central India Agency

- Sub-agency of the Central India Agency
- 1895–1947
- Area
  - Coordinates: 24.03°N 75.08°E
  - 1881: 31,000 km^{2} (12,000 sq mi)
- Population
  - 1881: 1,511,324
- History
  - Abolition of the Western Malwa Agency: 1895
  - Merger into Madhya Bharat: 1947
Preceded by	Succeeded by
Western Malwa Agency; Bhopawar Agency	Madhya Bharat

Malwa Agency was an administrative section of British India's Central India Agency. The headquarters of the political agent was at Neemuch (Nimach). The other chief towns of the region were : Ratlam and Jaora.

== History ==
The Malwa Agency was formed in 1895 out of princely states in the Northern Malwa region formerly under the authority of the British agent for Indore and the abolition of the Western Malwa Agency which had been a sub-agency of the Central India Agency since 1854.

The Dewas States (Dewas Senior & Dewas Junior) were added to Malwa Agency in 1907. In 1925 Malwa Agency was amalgamated with Bhopawar Agency to form the Malwa and Bhopawar Agency, renamed the Malwa and Southern States Agency in 1927. The Dewas States were transferred to Bhopal Agency in 1931, and in 1934 the agency was once again renamed Malwa Agency.

After Indian independence in 1947, the rulers of these states acceded to the Government of India and were amalgamated into the new Indian state of Madhya Bharat. Madhya Bharat was merged into Madhya Pradesh state on 1 November 1956.

== Princely states and estates ==
The agency included :

Salute states, by precedence :

- Ratlam State, title Maharaja Bahadur, Hereditary salute of 13-guns (15 local)
- Jaora State, title Nawab, Hereditary salute of 13-guns
- Sailana State, title Raja Bahadur, Hereditary salute of 11-guns
- Jhabua State, title Raja, Hereditary salute of 11-guns
- Sitamau State, title Raja, Hereditary salute of 11-guns

Non-salute states :

- Piploda State, title Rao (originally Thakur)
- Panth-Piploda Estate
- Barkhera Panth State .

Furthermore, it covered certain portions of - Gwalior State, Indore State, Tonk State & Dewas States (Senior & Junior) territories
