= Nandni Mata =

Nandni Mata Temple
- नंदनी माता मंदिर
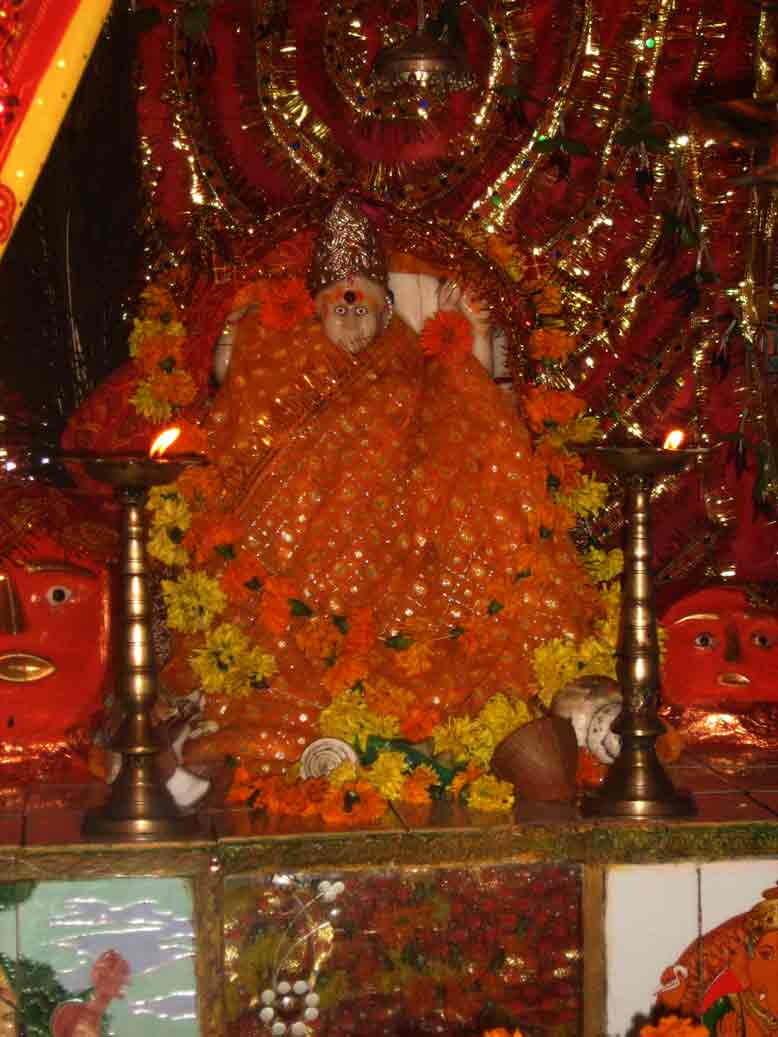

Religion
- Affiliation: Hinduism
- District: Banswara
- Deity: Nandni Mata (Durga)

Location
- Location: Banswara, Rajasthan, India
- State: Rajasthan
- Country: India

Nandni Mata is a Hindu goddess. The name Nandni (sometimes written Nandini) is another name for Durga, which means "daughter".

Nandni Mata is also called Nandore Ma in the Vagadi language. According to ancient Hindu epics, Nandni Mata was a daughter of Yashoda in the Dvapara Yuga, and killed Kamsa. Mostly she is worshipped at the Navratri festival. Nandni Mata appears in several Vedic hymns and is also described in the eleventh chapter of the book Durga Saptmi. The hymn also associates her with Yashoda's daughter.

Nandni Mata has been regarded as Mahakali Pavagadh of Gujarat in Vagad. An Adivasi folk dance called "garba" is also devoted to Nandni Mata. She is equally revered by Hindus, Jains and the Buddhists in the Vagad.

Nandni Mata Temple is very famous in the Banswara district of Rajasthan. It is 15 km from Banswara, situated on the state highway near Barodiya town. The main temple is located on top of the hills near Barodiya village in Vagad. Many myths and rituals centre on the black stone statue here some centuries ago which was later destroyed by demolishers, and is now replaced by the new beautiful idol.
