= Bhil Mama =

The Mama are a sub-division of the Bhil community, who are indigenous to the state of Rajasthan in India. They are known as Mama Bhil because they are followers of the Mama Baleshwar Dayal sect. The sect gets its name from Mama Baleshwar Dayal, who starting preaching to the Bhils of Kushalgarh tehsil of Banswara District. Their clans are referred to as Ataks.

The Maman are a community of small and medium-sized farmers. Most of their settlements are exclusively Kataria, and each of them contains an informal caste association. This acts as an instrument of social control, punishing those who transgress current community norms. They are now Hindu and unlike other Bhil groups have lost their ancestral non Brahminical tribal deities. The Kataria speak the Bagri dialect of Rajasthani.

== Marriage ==
Like other Bhil groups, they are endogamous and practice clan exogamy. This despite the recent but comparatively greater level of Brahminical Sanskritisation.

== See also ==
- Bhil Gametia
- Bhil Kataria
