= Motagaon =

- Town
- Motagaon
- Location in Rajasthan, India Motagaon (India)
- Coordinates: 23.805°N 74.253°E
- Country: India
- State: Rajasthan
- District: Banswara

Government
  - Type: Panchayat
  - Body: Motagaon Gram Panchayat
- Elevation: 200 m (660 ft)

Population (2011)
  - Total: 4,548
- Demonym: Banswara

Languages
  - Official: Hindi
  - Native: Wagri
- Time zone: UTC+05:30 (IST)
- PIN: 327021
- Vehicle registration: RJ-03

Motagaon is a town in Banswara district of Rajasthan, India. It is located in the Wagad region, The town is about 35 km from Banswara and 5 km from State Highway RJ SH-32 Banswara-Udaipur. The town is known for its famous temple called Ranchhod Ji Mandir dedicated to Lord Krishna near the banks of Mahi River. The 2011 Census of India estimated the population of Motagaon at 4,548.

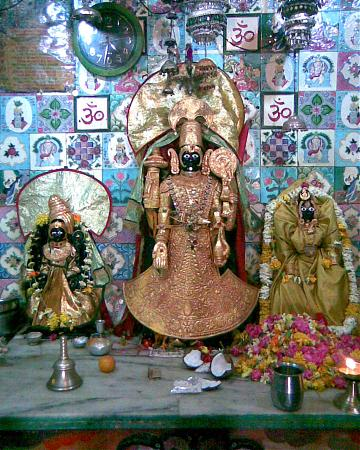
Ranchhod Ji Mandir in Motagaon

== Etymology ==
The name Motagaon comes from two words – Mota (large or big) and Gaon (town or village) compositely meaning big town.

== Geography ==
Motagaon has an average elevation of 200 metres (656 feet).

== Demographics ==
As of 2011 Indian Census, Motagaon had a total population of 4,548 of which 51.1% were males and 48.9% were females. Population within the age group of 0 to 6 years was 654. The total number of literates in Motagaon was 2596 which constituted 57.1% of the population with male literacy of 76.6% and female literacy of 23.4%. The sex ratio is 812 females per 1000 males. The Scheduled Castes and Scheduled Tribes population was 319 and 1869, respectively. Motagaon had 1,008 households in 2011.

== Religious places ==
Motagaon has many temples including Ranchhod Ji Temple, Shiv Mandir, Amba Mata Mandir, Krishna Mandir, Hanuman Mandir and other religious places.

Thousands of devotees visit Ranchhod Ji Temple to attend fair held every year and holy festivals like Navratri, Ganesh Chaturthi, Diwali, Holi, etc. are celebrated.

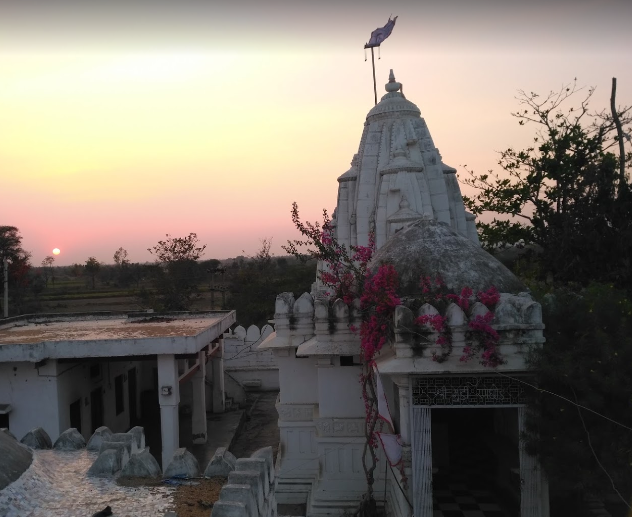
Ranchhod Ji Temple at sunset

== Transportation ==
=== Road ===
Motagaon is well connected by roads and is connected to Banswara and Udaipur by SH–32 or Banswara-Udaipur Highway. Motagaon is also connected to Pratapgarh, Chittorgarh, Dungarpur and Madhya Pradesh by interlinked roads connecting it to highways.

=== Rail ===
Nearest railway station is Udaipur 125 km and Ratlam 125 km.
