= Anand Sagar Lake =

Lake in Rajasthan, India

- Location within Rajasthan
- Location: Banswara district, Rajasthan, India
- Coordinates: 23.546°N 74.475°E

Anand Sagar Lake, also known as Bai Talaab, is an artificial lake in present-day Banswara district, Rajasthan. It was constructed by Jagmal Singh of Banswara for his Queen Lanchi Bai.

== Tourist attractions ==
The lake side is adorned by rows of kalpavriksha trees and also has chhatris or cenotaphs related to other rulers of the state of Banswara.
