= Barodiya =

- village
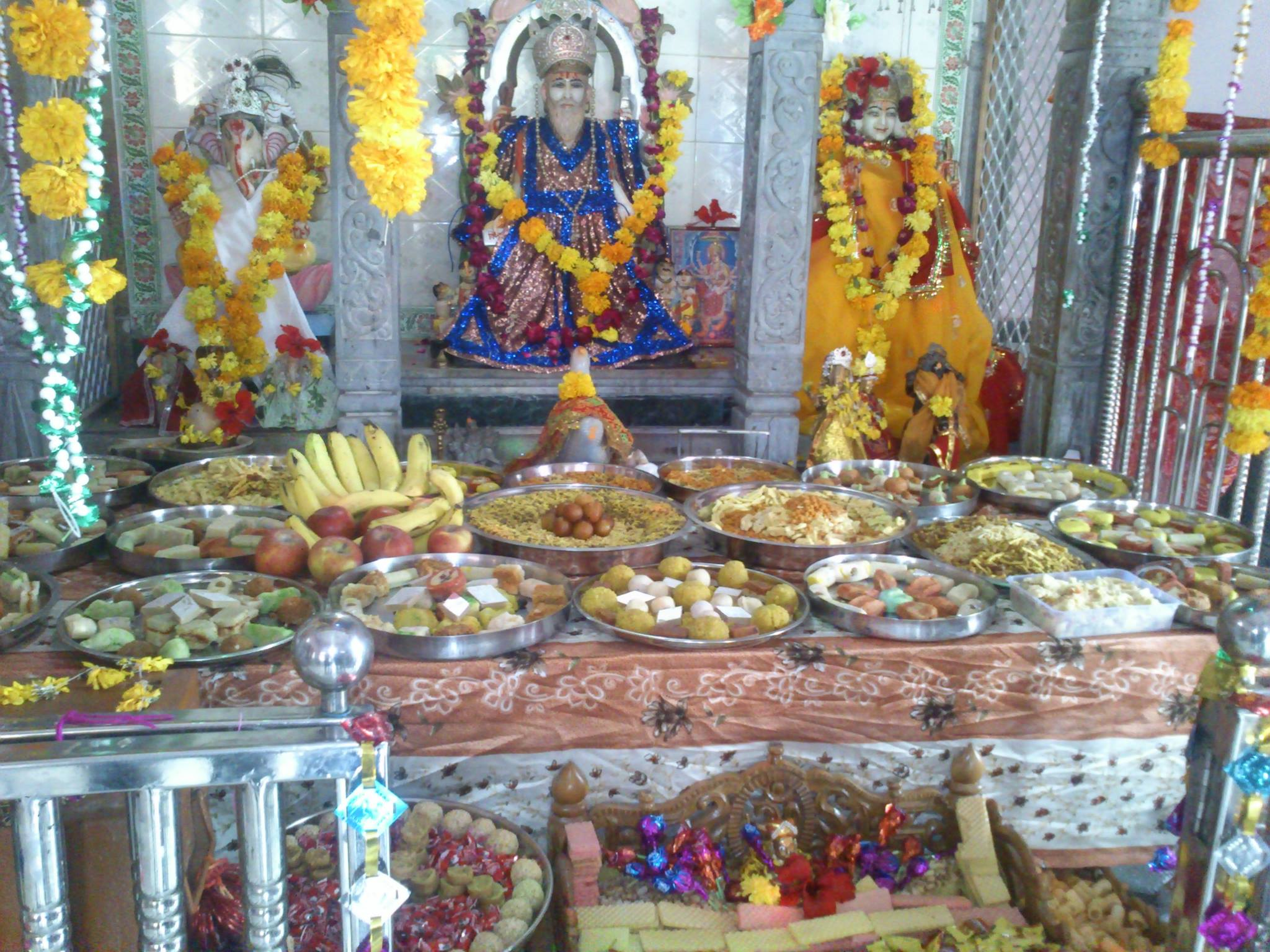
- Country: India
- State: Rajasthan
- District: Banswara

Languages
  - Official: Hindi
- Time zone: UTC+5:30 (IST)
- PIN: 327604
- Telephone code: 02968
- ISO 3166 code: RJ-IN
- Nearest city: Banswara, Dungarpur Udaipur

Barodiya is a village in Banswara district on the Nimbahera – Dahod national highway 113 in Rajasthan, India.

== Demographics ==
This village has about 2000 homes of Brahmins, Kumbhars, panchal, suthars and Jain. Brahmins and Jains are the majority. Brahmins, suthar and Jains are the educated classes of the village. People have their own businesses and they work for others as well.

== Temples ==
Barodiya has a large Laxmi Narayan temple and Jain temple in the centre of the village. Both temples are studded with diamonds and gold with an idol of Lakshmi Narayan and Viswakarma temple is also very beautiful architecture.

Barodia is known as a magical village. The villagers practicing ancient magic tricks for centuries. A must visit once in a lifetime, especially 2 days after Diwali on magician mela that involves semi-tribal magic and activities like local music, Dance, Entertainment, etc. These local do not show their tricks outside of their village as per their traditions. They believe the magical powers a given to them by Bharon Baba. There is an ancient Bhairon Temple. Nandni temple is a visiting place of Barodia and Banswara. Thousands visit there every month.

== Canal ==
This village has a canal. The canal was originally planned for the outskirts of the village but as constructed it goes right through the centre of the village. The canal is used for washing clothes, bathing, and supplying water to cattle. The number of deaths since its construction has been on the rise due to drowning, suicides and sudden release of water in the canal. The canal provides water for irrigation, thus increasing the productivity of the land. But at the same time the fields closest the canal have become oversaturated and are always filled with water, thereby making them useless for crops.

== Education ==
In Barodiya village the level of education is very high because maximum people here are educated. In Barodiya village many people have government and private jobs.
