= Bagadi =

Bagadi may refer to:

- Bagadi, Nepal
- Bagdi or Wagdi, one of the Bhil tribes of India
- Bagdi (caste), an ethnic group in India and Bangladesh, also known as Bargakshatriya
- A sub-clan of the Digil in Somalia

== See also ==
- Wagdi, a Bhil (Indo-Aryan) language of India
