= Mama Baleshwar Dayal =

Indian social worker and socialist politician

Mama Baleshwar Dayal (10 March 1905 – 26 December 1998) was a social worker and socialist politician from India. He is remembered for his work among the Bhil tribes of Rajasthan and Madhya Pradesh whom he organised to fight for their rights to jal, jungle aur jameen (water, forest and land).

== Early life of Mama Baleshwar Dayal ==
Dayal was born at Nivadikalan in the Etawah district of the United Provinces of Agra and Oudh in 1905 as the son of Shiv Shankar Lal. He was a Gandhian activist and participant in India's freedom struggle. He was married to Shrimati Savitri.

== Work among the Bhils ==
Dayal worked among the Bhil tribals of Banswara and Dungarpur. He was a reformer and activist who worked to eliminate the social evils of alcoholism, polygamy, superstition and bride-price that existed among the Bhils. He also mobilised the Bhils to fight their exploitation by the state and private individuals. Dayal led the Bhils to attain their rights to jal, jungle aur jameen (water, forest and land) and led the struggle for the regularisation of forest lands that had been encroached upon by the tribals in Jhabua, Madhya Pradesh in 1975. The Bhils of Banaswara came to be called Mama Bhil by non-tribals on account of their being followers of Dayal who was called mama or uncle by the Bhils. The tribe has undergone significant changes in their lifestyle and cultural practices by embracing vegetarianism, abjuring alcohol and wearing the sacred thread.

=== Criticism ===
Dayal was also the founder of the Bhagat Movement which has been accused in the years following his death of communalising the tribals and promoting their conversion to Hinduism. He led the jungle kato (cut down the forest) movement in Madhya Pradesh in the 1960s where tribals cut down trees and sold them off to contractors. The agitation was responsible for large scale deforestation in the Jhabua and Dhar districts of the state and the consequent environmental damage reduced the Bhils and Bhilala tribal groups in Jhabua district to dependence on government relief for their survival.

== Political career ==
Dayal was a socialist and his work among the Bhils turned them into a votebank of the Socialist and, later, Janata Party in Rajasthan. He was a Member of Parliament in the Rajya Sabha from Madhya Pradesh between 1977 and 1984 and was president of the All India Samyukta Socialist Party in 1973. Following his death, the Janata Dal was weakened considerably in its strongholds of Banswara and Dungarpur and right wing political forces led by the Sangh Parivar have sought to appropriate his legacy to gain an electoral foothold in the tribal areas and to oppose the activities of Christian missionaries in the region.

== Death and commemoration ==
Dayal died in Jhabua in 1998 at the age of 93. His samadhi is at the Bhil Ashram in the Bamniya village of Jhabua where Bhils from several states and political leaders from the Janata and socialist parties congregate every year to pay their respects on the occasion of his death anniversary which falls on Boxing Day. In 2003, the Vice-President of India, Bhairon Singh Shekhawat, unveiled a statue of Dayal at Chudada in Rajasthan. The Mama Baleshwar Dayal Government College at Kushalgarh in Banswara has been named after him. Dayal was conferred the Indira Gandhi Social Service Award in 1995 by the Government of Madhya Pradesh.
