= Naugama =

Naugama Nogama, Nogumu
- village
- Location in Rajasthan, India Naugama (India)
- Coordinates: 23.437157°N 74.2536229°E
- Country: India
- State: Rajasthan
- District: Banswara

Government
  - Body: Gram Panchayat, Naugama

Area
  - Total: 4 km^{2} (1.5 sq mi)

Population (2009)
  - Total: 5,000
  - Density: 1,200/km^{2} (3,200/sq mi)

Languages
  - Official: Hindi
- Time zone: UTC+5:30 (IST)
- PIN: 327032
- Telephone code: 02968
- ISO 3166 code: RJ-IN
- Vehicle registration: RJ-03
- Coastline: 0 kilometres (0 mi)
- Nearest city: Banswara, Udaipur
- Lok Sabha constituency: Banswara
- Civic agency: Gram Panchayat, Naugama
- Climate: Even (Köppen)
- Avg. summer temperature: 40 °C (104 °F)
- Avg. winter temperature: 11 °C (52 °F)

Naugama is a small village in Banswara District of Rajasthan, India. It is situated in Bagidora Tehsil.

History : The village is believed to have been created by refugees of 9 villages from Rajasthan and Gujarat states during an old famine. The word Nau-gama is derived from 9 (Nau) Villages (Gam).

The population is around 5000 as of 2014. However, if we add nearby newly created villages it touches 12000. Officially it is still 5000.

The village has a mix of Rajputs (of Gujrat and Rajasthan), Patel's (of Gujarat), Brahmins (of Gujarat and Mewad), and Native (Adivasis). It has a significant population of Jains, which has also made it a big trading center. A good number of Muslims (mainly from Afghan origin) have settled in the village.

The village population is involved in agricultural activities. Due to availability of water, farmers here have 3 crops. some farmers even have 4th crop of vegetable in same fiend, during May to June.

The villagers are quite educated. The village has a good number of teachers. There are some doctors, engineers and bankers also from the village.

The village has a low crime rate.
