= Govind Guru Tribal University =

Indian state university

Coordinates: 23.5824°N 74.4681°E

- Former name: Rajiv Gandhi Tribal University
- Type: Public
- Established: 2012; 14 years ago
- Affiliations: UGC
- Chancellor: Governor of Rajasthan
- Vice-Chancellor: Dr. K. S. Thakur
- Location: Banswara, Rajasthan, India
- Website: www.ggtu.ac.in

Govind Guru Tribal University (GGTU), formerly Rajiv Gandhi Tribal University, is a state university located at Banswara, Rajasthan, India. It was established in 2012, and renamed in 2016.

== History ==
It was established in 2012 by the Government of Rajasthan through the Rajiv Gandhi Tribal University, Udaipur Act, 2012 and was to be named after the 6th Prime Minister of India, Rajiv Gandhi, and to be located in Udaipur. T.C. Damor was appointed the first Vice Chancellor (VC) of the university in July 2013. The university was run from a building within Mohanlal Sukhadia University with no regular faculty other than the VC.

In 2016, it was renamed through the Rajiv Gandhi Tribal University, Udaipur (Change of Name and Headquarters, and Amendment) Act, 2016, and its headquarters moved to Banswara. It has jurisdiction over all colleges in the districts of Banswara, Dungarpur and Pratapgarh. K.C. Sodani was appointed (VC) of the university in July 2017. I.V. Trivedi was appointed VC in July 2020.
