= Dungra =

- Census town
- Location in Rajasthan, India Dungra (India)
- Coordinates: 23°10′N 74°18′E
- Country: India
- State: Rajasthan
- District: Banswara

Population (2001)
  - Total: 24,522

Languages
  - Official: Gujarati, Hindi
- Time zone: UTC+5:30 (IST)

Dungra is a census town in Banswara district in the state of Rajasthan, India.

== Demographics ==
As of 2001 India census, Dungra had a population of 24,522. Males constitute 62% of the population and females 38%. Dungra has an average literacy rate of 73%, higher than the national average of 59.5%: male literacy is 80% and, female literacy is 63%. In Dungra, 16% of the population is under 6 years of age.
