= Andeshwar Parshwanath Jain Temple =

Jain temple in India

Andeshwar Parshwanath Tirtha
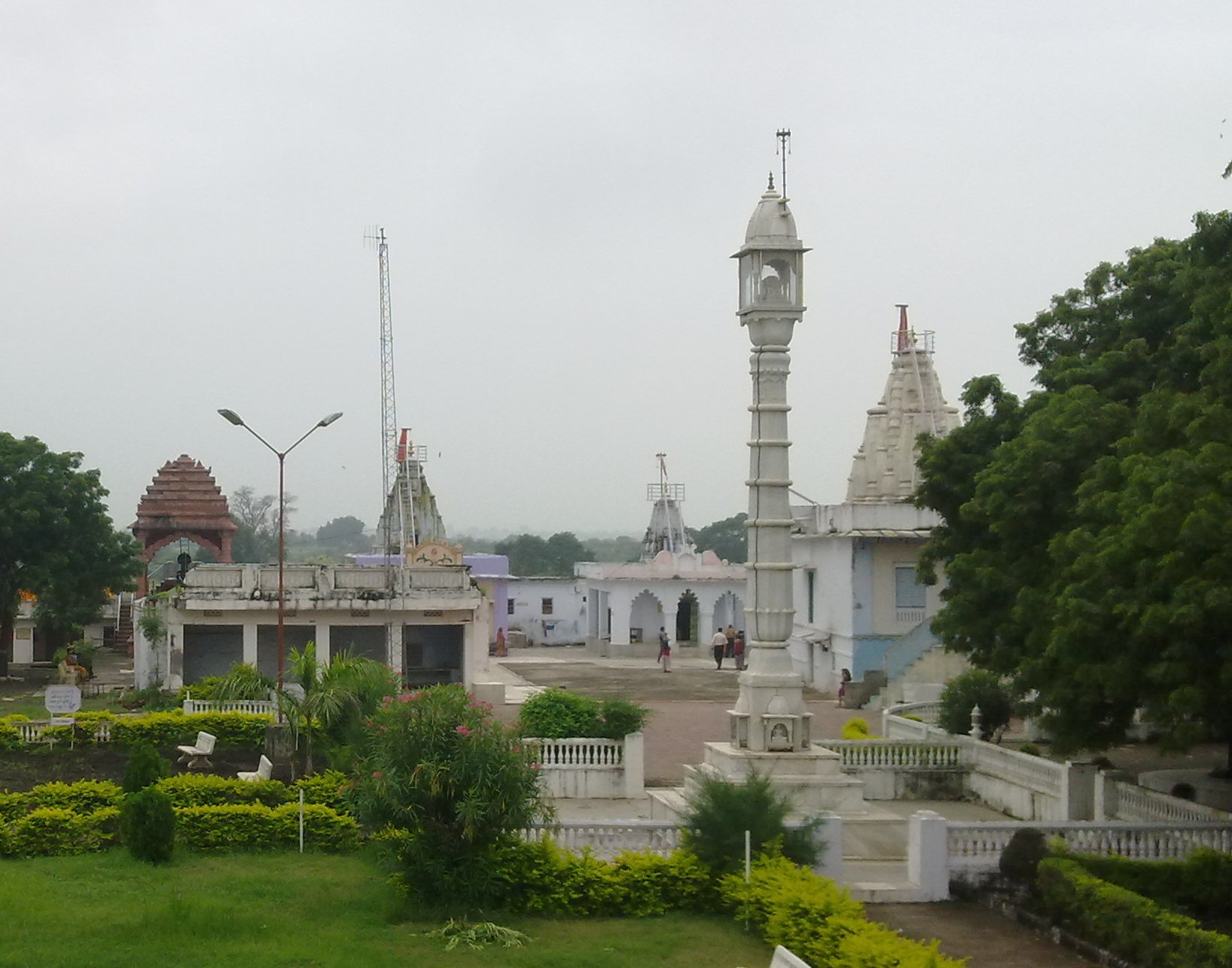
- Parshwanath Pratima in Temple

Religion
- Affiliation: Jainism
- Deity: Parshwanath
- Festivals: Kartik Poornima, Mahavir Janma Kalyanak

Location
- Location: Kushalgarh, Banswara, Rajasthan, India
- Interactive map of Andeshwar Parshwanath Tirtha
- Coordinates: 23.296°N 74.348°E

Architecture
- Established: 14th Century
- Temple: 2

Shri Andeshwar Parshwanath Jain temple is situated in Rajasthan, and is located 40 km from Banswara. The tirth is located on a hillock in Andeshwar, Kushalgarh tehsil of Banswara district.

== History ==
The temple houses rare inscriptions that dates back to the 10th century.

== Description ==
Chief attraction of the temple is the mulnayak Parshwanath idol, which is believed to be of 12th or 13th century. Black idol of lord Parshwanath is around 80 cm tall with seven hoods. It is believed to be discovered by tribes of that regions while cultivating the field. Every year on kartik purnima i.e. fifteenth lunar day of Hindi month kartik, a fair is organized which is visited by people from the neighboring towns and villages. The temple was constructed in 14th Century. It was recently renovated. The manasthambh made by white colored marble is really attractive. A Kanch Mandir dedicated to Parshwantha was also constructed recently near the main temple.

== Gallery ==
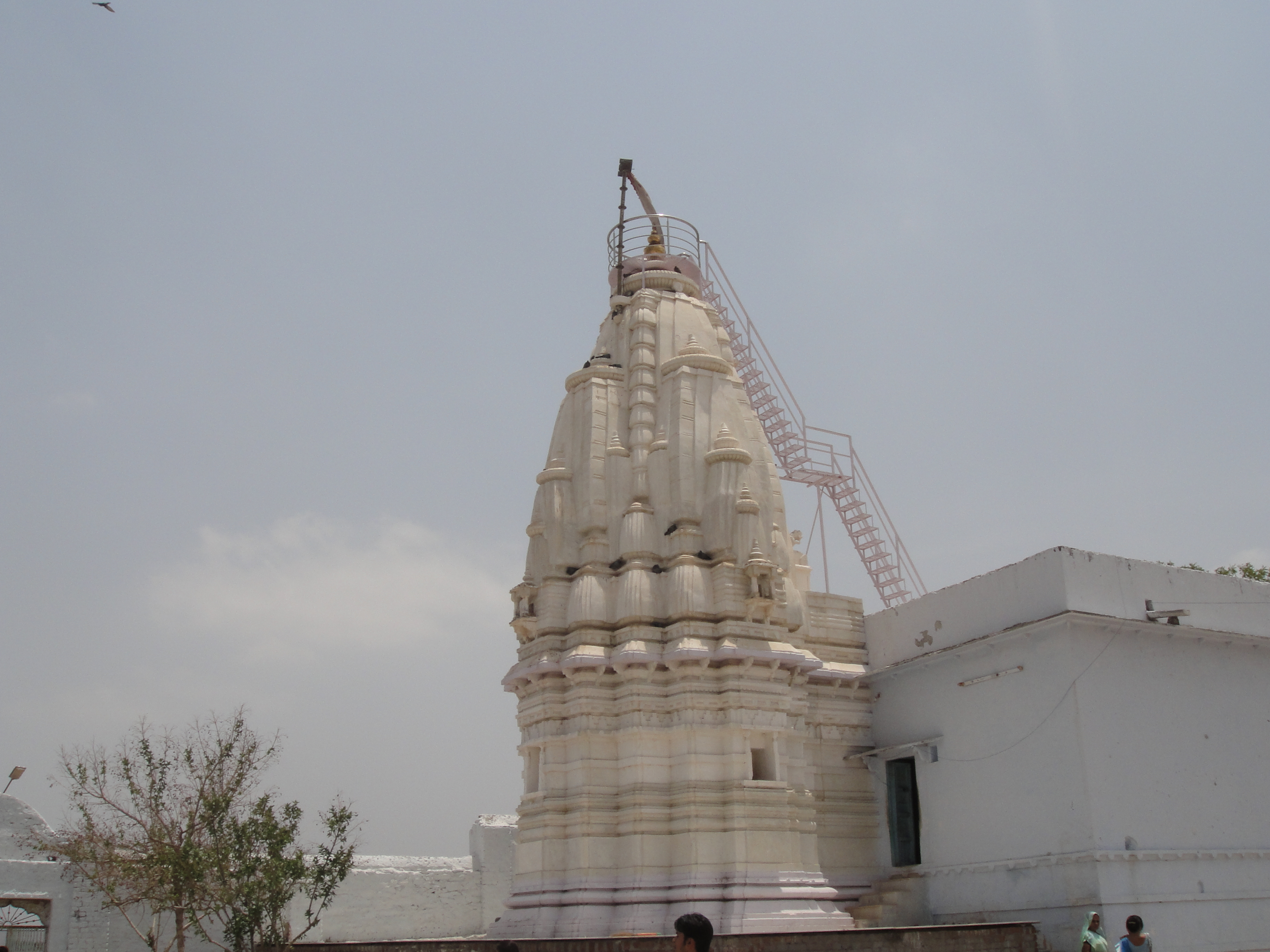
Andeshwar Main Temple

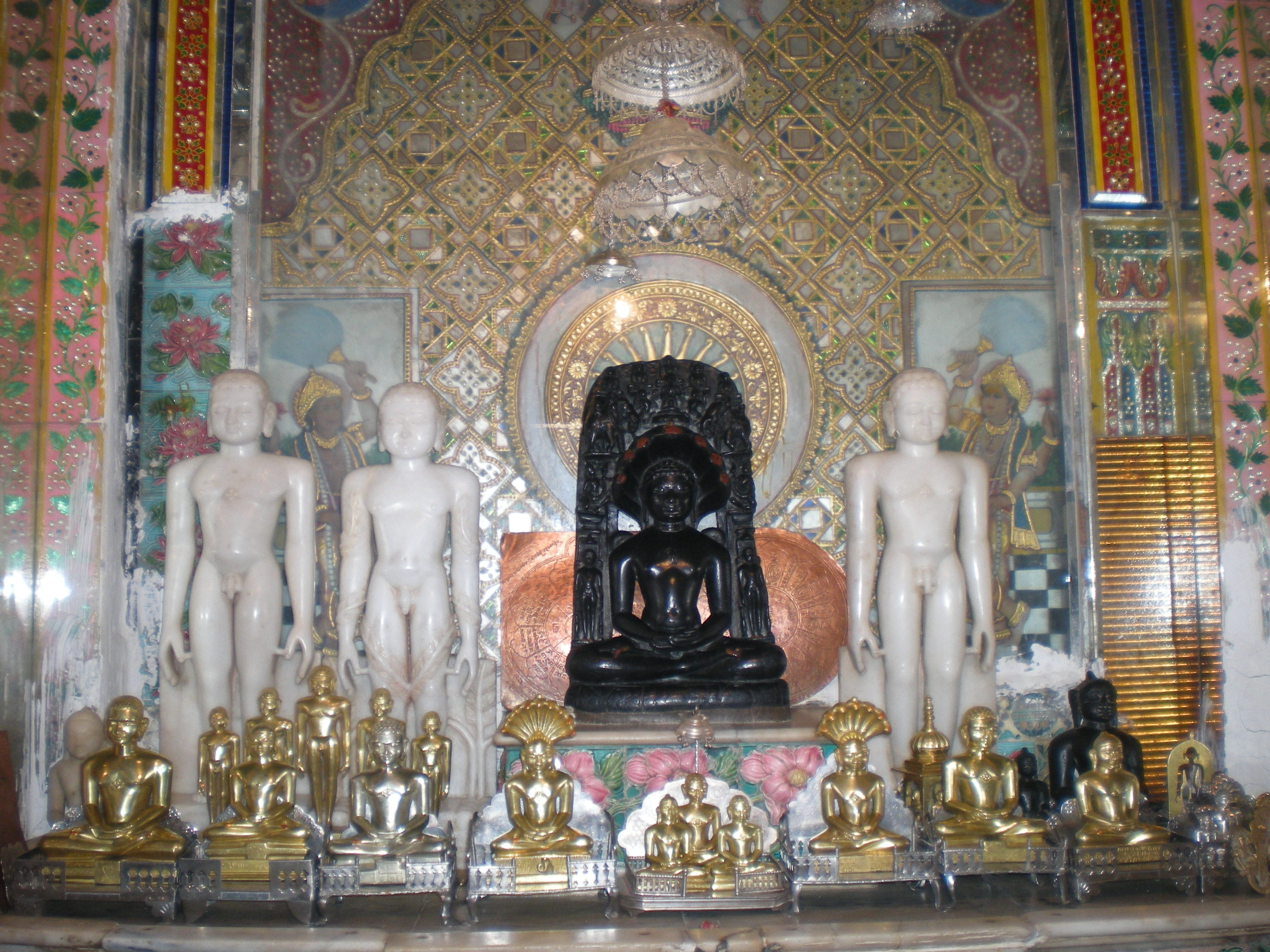
23rd Jain tirthankara Parshwanath Pratima

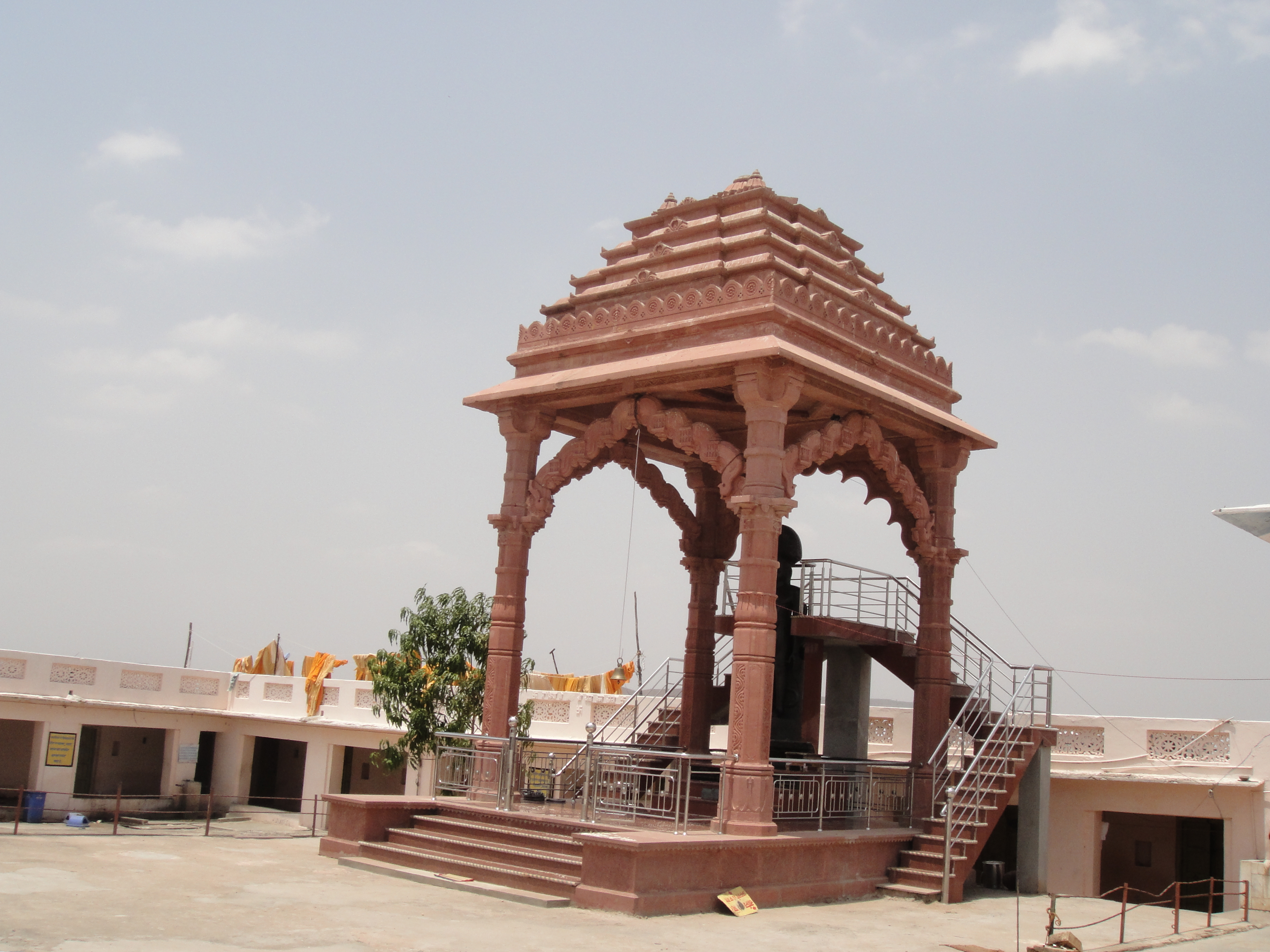
Andeshwar Jain Temple

== See also ==
- Jainism in Rajasthan
