= Vagad =

Region in southeastern Rajasthan, India

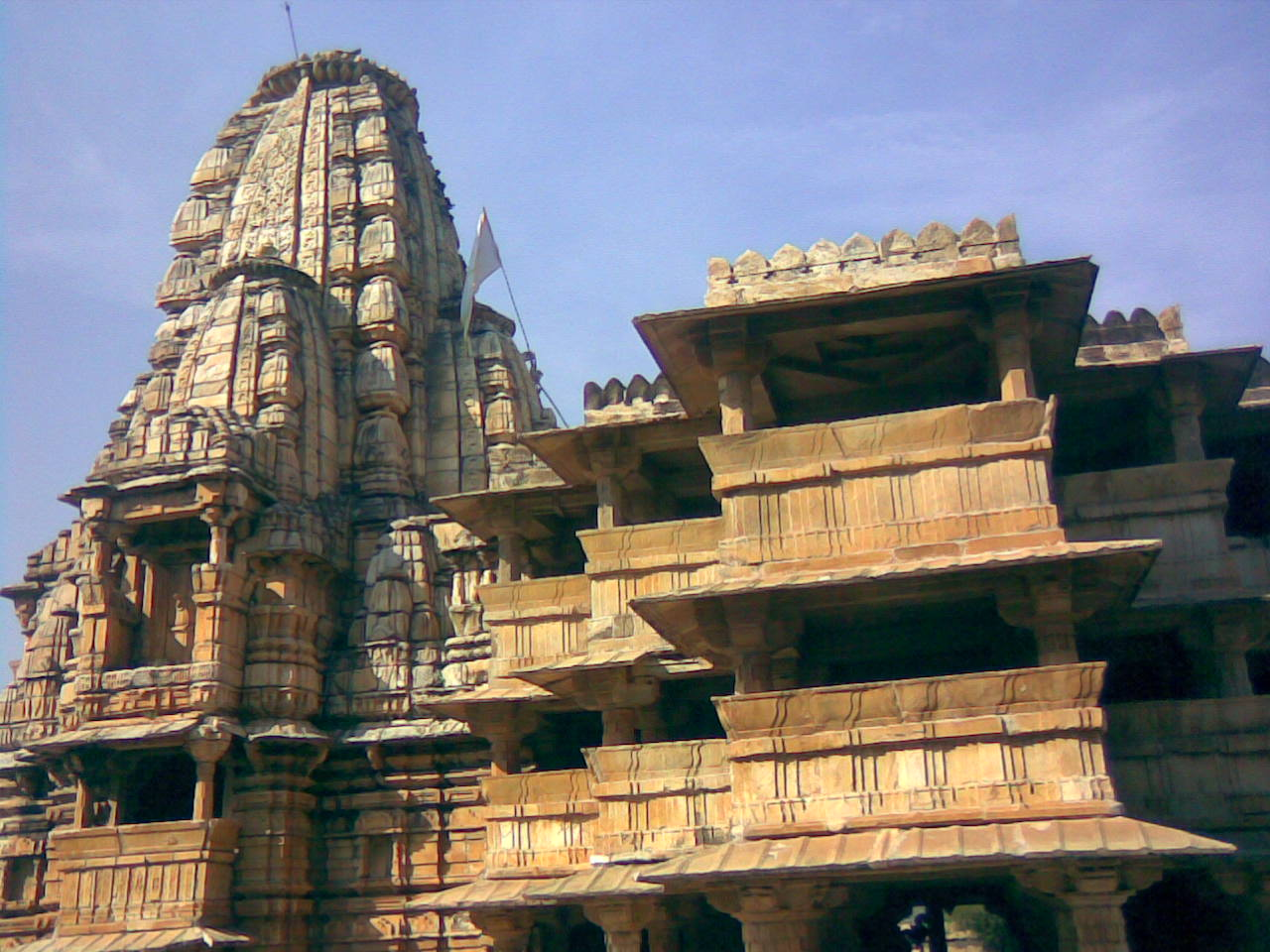
Historical Region of Western India; Vagad
Location	southern Rajasthan
19th-century flag
State established:	11th Century
Language	Vagdi (dialect), Hindi
Dynasties	Parmar Rajput, Bangdiya(बांगड़वा)Chauhan Koliya Rajvans, rmar Damor Lineage.
Historical capitals	Dungarpur, Sagwara
Separated states	Banswara, Kushalgarh

Vagad is a region in southeastern Rajasthan state of western India. Scholars have referred to Vagad by different names, such as Bagar, Vagwar, Vaiyagad, Vagat, Varget, and Bagad. Its boundaries are roughly defined by those of the districts of Dungarpur and Banswara. Major cities of the region are Dungarpur and Banswara.

== Geography ==
Vagad is bounded on the north by Mewar region of Rajasthan, on the southeast and eastby Malwa region of Madhya Pradesh, and on the west and southwest by Gujarat state. The region mostly lies in the upper watershed of the Mahi River and its tributaries, which is said to be the lifeline of Vagad. The Mahi flows north through the district (Banswara) from its origin in the Vindhya Range of Madhya Pradesh, entering the district (Banswara) from the southeast and flowing north towards the northern end of the district, where it turns southwest to form the boundary between Banswara and Dungarpur districts before entering Gujarat and emptying into the Gulf of Cambay.

Vagad has rich flora and fauna. The forests include mainly teak. The wildlife includes a large variety of wild animals such as the leopard and the chinkara. Common birds in the region include fowl, partridge, black drongo, grey shrike, green bee-eater, bulbul and parrot. Some of the towns in this region are Aspur, Bhiluda, Simalwada, Sagwara, Partapur, Bagidra and Garhi.

== History ==
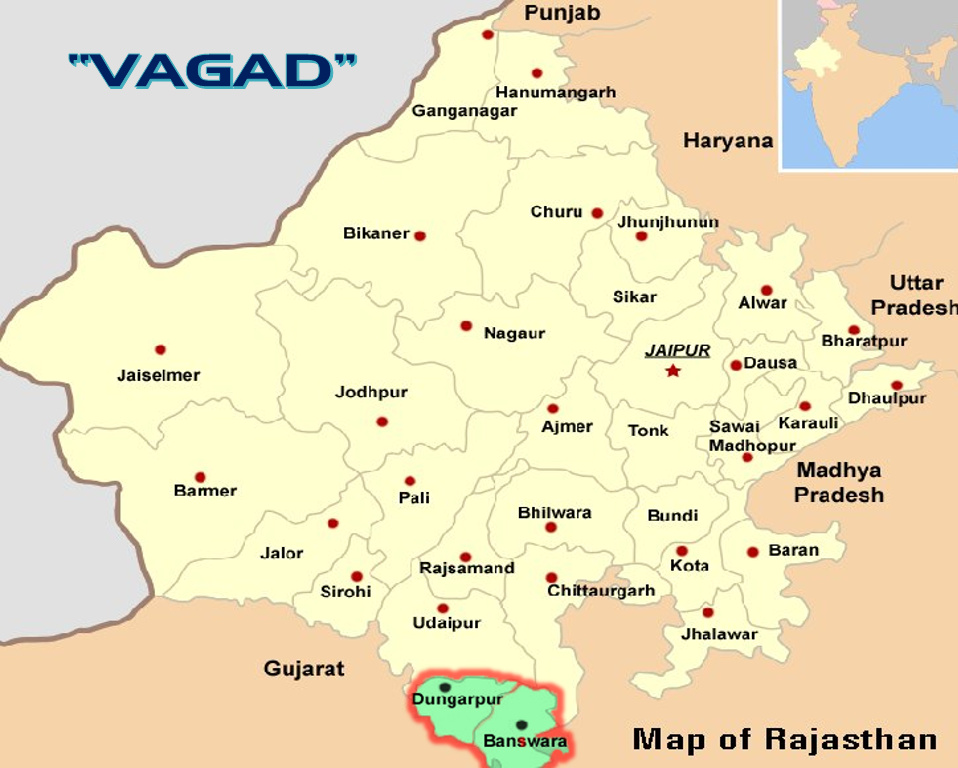
Vagad region consists of Dungarpur and Banswara districts.

Before the thirteenth century, a large portion of Vagad is said to have been occupied by the Bhils, and the rest by Chauhans and Parmars. Mahap, the eldest son of Karan Singh, the Rawal of Chittor, was compelled to leave his paternal state. He then proceeded to a part of Vagad, which was held in possession by the Chauhans, the family of his mother. He was accompanied by a band of Bhils of the Damor section. Over time, he extended his sway over the Bhils of the Vagad with the support of the Chauhans, carved out a State for himself in the Vagad, and assumed the title of Rawal. As the elder son, he also retained the surname Ahada, which his ancestors had adopted instead of Guhilot. Meanwhile, the family of his younger brother adopted the patronymic of Sisodia and the title of Rana. One of Mahap's successors, Bir Singh, in 1357, killed a Bhil chief by the name of Dungaria, took possession of his territory, and established Dungarpur on it.

All princely states were merged into Rajasthan prior to 1947.

According to the 2011 Census of India, this region has a population of 3,186,037 people.
