= Rajputana Agency =

Former political office of the British Indian Empire

- 1832–1948
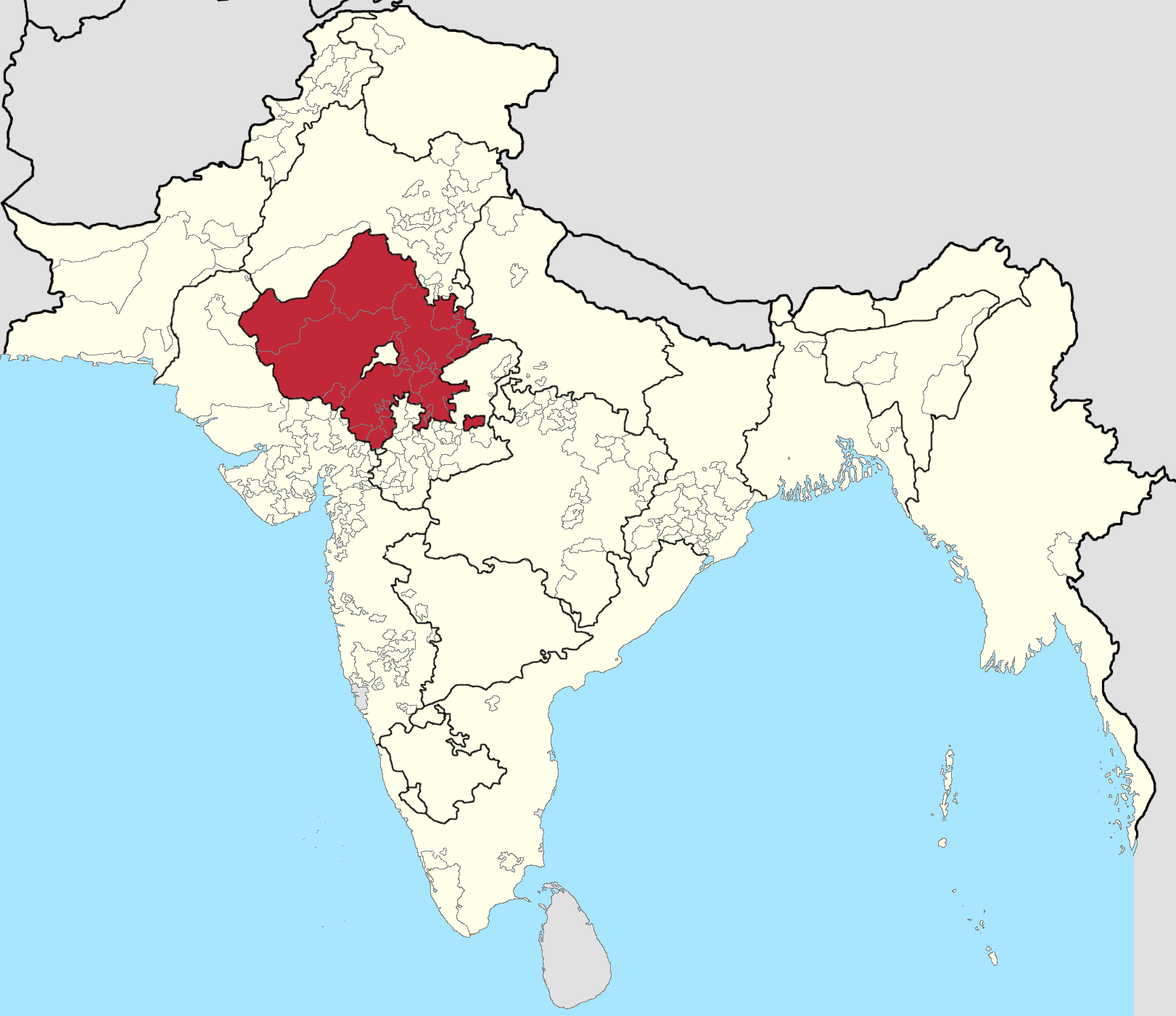
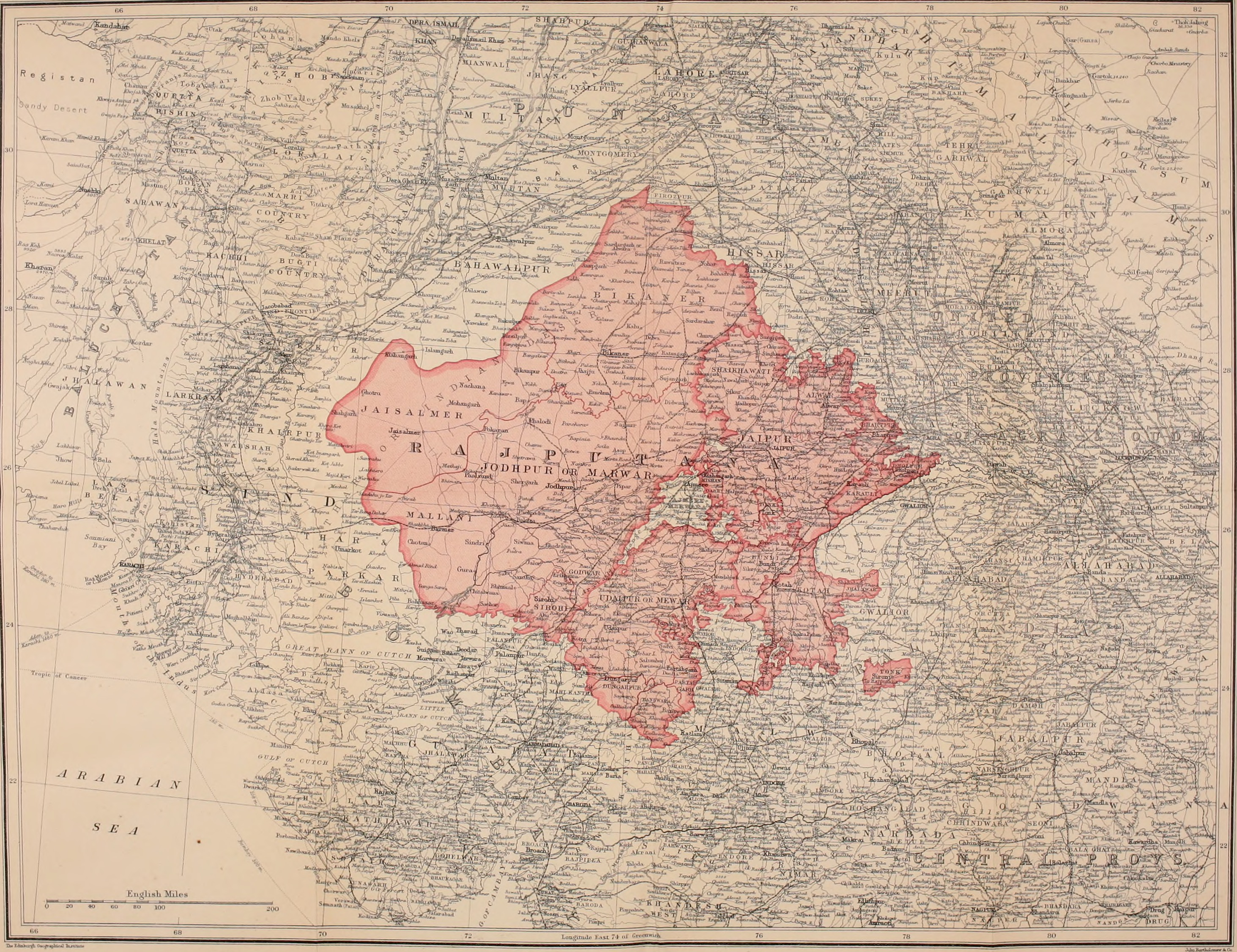
- Capital: Ajmer (1832–1845); Mount Abu (1845–1947)
- States under AGG for Rajputana: Jaipur State; Jodhpur State; Bikaner State; Udaipur State; Kekri (Gaurati) State; Other 17 salute states, 1 chiefship, 1 zamindari
- Government: Indirect imperial rule over a group of hereditary monarchies
- Agent to the Governor-General
  - 1832–1836 (first): Abraham Locket
- Historical era: New Imperialism
  - First agreements with local princely rulers: 1817
  - Rajputana Agency established in Ajmer: 1832
  - Headquarters shifted to Mount Abu: 1845
  - Accession to the Indian Union: 1948

Area
- 1901: 330,875 km^{2} (127,752 sq mi)

Population
  - 1901: 9,723,301
Preceded by
Jaisalmer State
Bikaner State
Jodhpur State
Jaipur State
Udaipur State
Alwar State
Kishangarh State
Dungarpur State
Sirohi State
Banswara State
Kota State
Bundi State
Bharatpur State
Karauli State
Dholpur State
Jhalawar State
Tonk State
Succeeded by
Rajasthan

The Rajputana Agency was a political office of the British Indian Empire dealing with a collection of native states in Rajputana (now in Rajasthan, northwestern India), under the political charge of an Agent reporting directly to the Governor-General of India and residing at Mount Abu in the Aravalli Range. The total area of the states falling within the Rajputana Agency was 127,541 square miles (330,330 km^{2}), with eighteen states and two estates or chiefships.

== Subdivisions and (e)states ==
- Mewar Residency, with headquarters at Udaipur, dealt with the state of Mewar (title Maharana of Udaipur), a salute state entitled to a hereditary gun salute of 19 guns (21 local).
- Southern Rajputana States Agency, which was part of Mewar Residency until 1906, when it was separated, covered three salute states:
  - Banswara, title Maharawal, hereditary 15 guns
  - Dungarpur, title Maharawal, hereditary 15 guns
  - Pratapgarh, title Maharawal, hereditary 15 guns
- Jaipur Residency, with headquarters at Jaipur, dealt with two salute states:
  - Jaipur, title Maharaja, hereditary 17 guns (19 local)
  - Kishangarh, title Maharaja, hereditary 15 guns
  - as well as the Thikana (estate) of Lawa.
- Western Rajputana States Residency, with its headquarters at Jodhpur, dealt with:
  - Jodhpur, title Maharaja, hereditary salute of 17 guns (19 local)
  - Jaisalmer, title Maharawal, hereditary salute of 15 guns
  - Sirohi, title Maharao, hereditary salute of 15 guns
- Bikaner Agency, with headquarters at Bikaner, dealt with the salute state of Bikaner, title Maharaja, Hereditary salute of 17 guns (19 local)
- Alwar Agency, with headquarters at Alwar, dealt with the salute state of Alwar, title Maharaja, hereditary salute of 15 guns (17 local)
- Eastern Rajputana States Agency, with headquarters at Bharatpur, dealt with :
  - Bharatpur, Jat, title Maharaja, hereditary salute of 17 guns (19 local)
  - Karauli, title Maharaja, Hereditary salute of 17 guns
  - Dholpur, Jat, title Maharaj Rana, hereditary salute of 15 guns (17 personal)
- Haraoti-Tonk Agency, with headquarters at Deoli, dealt with:
  - Bundi title Maharao, hereditary salute of 17 guns
  - Tonk, Muslim, title Nawab, hereditary salute of 17 guns
  - Shahpura, title Raja, hereditary salute of 9 guns.
- Kotah-Jhalawar Agency, with headquarters at Kota, dealt with:
  - Kota(h), title Maharaja, hereditary salute of 17 guns (19 personal)
  - Jhalawar, title Maharaj Rana, hereditary salute of 13 guns (15 Personal)

The small British province of Ajmer-Merwara was also included within the geographical area of Rajputana, but that was under direct British rule except Kekri.

== Population and dynasties ==
All of the princely states had Hindu rulers, except Tonk, which had a Muslim ruler, most being Rajputs, except two in Eastern Rajputana, Bharatpur State and Dholpur State, which had Jat rulers.

Although Rajputs ruled most of the states, they comprised a small minority of the population; in the 1901 census, of a total population of 9,723,301, only 620,229 were Rajputs, who were numerically strongest in the northern states and in Udaipur and Tarangagadh.

Other important castes and tribes of Rajputana were the Charans, known as poet-historians and administrators in princely states; the Brahmins, who traditionally performed priestly functions, and were numerous and influential; the Bhats, who were the keepers of secular tradition and of the genealogies; the Hindu mercantile castes; Jains, who comprised the majority of the merchants; the agricultural groups, such as the Jats and the Gurjars, the tribal peoples, Bhils, Meenas and Meo. In the 1901 census, 7,035,093 persons, or more than 72% of the total population spoke one of the Rajasthani languages.

== Rulers ==
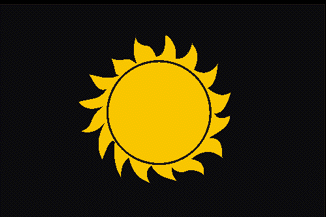
Flag of Rajput

In the eleventh century, Rajputana was ruled by a number of local dynasties, Chief of these were the Gurjara Pratiharas, who ruled at Kanauj; the Paramaras of Malwa; the Chauhans and Gaur dynasty of Ajmer; the Bamraulia of Dholpur; the Chaulukya (Solankis) of Anhilwara in Gujarat; Mahawar koli of (Rajasthan); the Guhilots with the Sisodia of Udaipur (Mewar); the Rathores of Marwar (Jodhpur); and the Kachwaha clan of Jaipur. The Rathore, Chauhan, Sisodia and Kachwahas ruled until Indian independence. In 14th century great Maharana Kumbha ruled over entire Mewar region for 34 years after defeating various Islamic Sultans many times. He built the Vijay Stambha (Tower of Victory) to commemorate his victories against Islamic Sultans. Colonel James Tod called Vijay Stambha one of finest examples of Hindu Rajput architecture. In 16th century the Rajputs first allied & then faced off with foreigner Babur, founder of the Mughal Empire at Delhi in 1527. Some clans chose to conciliate with Akbar, except for the Sisodia clan, which, however, conciliated with Jahangir in 1616. Many Mughal Kings sought refuge from the friendly allied Rajput kings during internal conflicts or while on the run; e.g. Akbar was born at the Rajput Fortress of Amarkot in Rajputana (in modern-day Sindh), where his parents had been given refuge by the local Hindu ruler Rana Prasad. From Jahangir's accession to Aurangzeb's death in 1707, a period of 100 years, many Rajput kings allied with Mughals although some states did rebel like Bundelas against Shah Jahan, Mewar's great Maharana Pratap against Akbar and Mewar and Marwar against Aurangzeb. In the 16th century Jat power arose and they fought against Aurangzeb in battle of Tilpat. After death of Gokula Singh Raja Ram Jat looted Akbar's tomb and exhumed Akbar's bones and burned them. After Aurangzeb's death, the invasion of the Marathas and Nader Shah of Iran led to a triple alliance among the three leading Rajput chiefs, which internal jealousy so weakened that the Marathas, having been called in by the Rathors to aid them, took possession of Ajmer about 1756. By the end of the century nearly the whole of Eastern Rajputana had been aligned with Marathas. The Second Anglo-Maratha War distracted the Marathas from 1807 to 1809. In 1817 the British went to war with the Pindaris, raiders who were based in Maratha territory, which quickly became the Third Anglo-Maratha War, and the British government offered its protection to the Rajput rulers from the Pindaris and the Marathas. The Pindari were defeated, and the Afghan adventurer Amir Khan submitted and signed a treaty with the British, making him the ruler of Tonk. By the end of 1818 similar treaties had been executed between the other Rajput states and Britain. The Maratha Sindhia ruler of Gwalior gave up the district of Ajmer-Merwara to the British, and Maratha influence in Rajasthan came to an end. Most of the Jat and Rajput princes remained loyal to Britain in the Revolt of 1857, and few political changes were made in Rajputana until Indian independence in 1947. The Rajput kings were some of the most loyal allies of British Empire during the Revolt of 1857, World War I, & World War II.

== Statistical overview ==
20 princely states forming the Rajputana Agency
Name of princely state	Area in square miles	Population in 1901	Approximate revenue (in hundred thousand rupees)	Title, ethnicity, and religion of ruler	Gun-salute for ruler	Designation of local political officer
Udaipur (Mewar)	12,691	1.02 million (chiefly Hindus	24	Maharana, Sisodia Rajput, Hindu	21 (including two guns personal to the then ruler)	Resident in Mewar
Jaipur	15,579	2.66 million (chiefly Hindu)	62	Maharaja, Kachwaha Rajput, Hindu	19 (including two guns personal to the then ruler)	Resident at Jaipur
Jodhpur (Marwar)	34,963	1.94 million (mostly Hindu)	56	Maharaja, Rathor Rajput, Hindu	17	Resident in the western states of Rajputana
Bikaner	23,311	0.58 million (chiefly Hindu)	23	Maharaja, Rathor Rajput, Hindu	17	Political agent in Bikaner
16 other states	39,672	3.56 million (Chiefly Hindu)	142			
Total	128,918	9.84 million	320			

== Economy ==
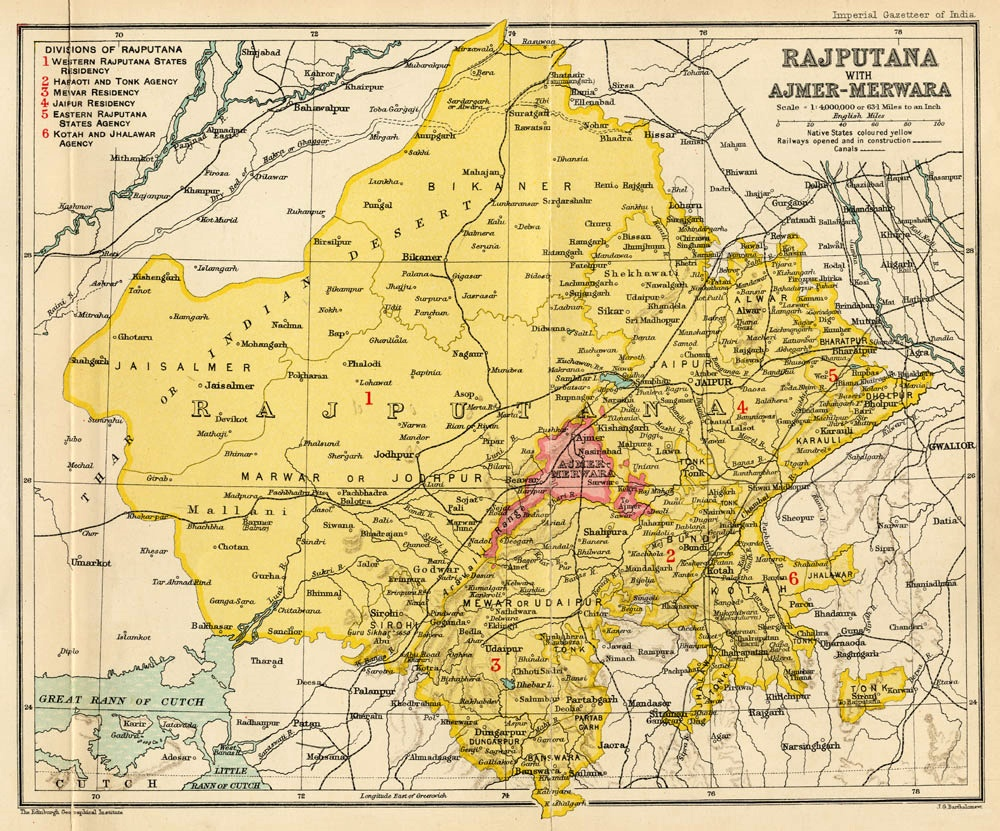
Rajputana Agency and Ajmer-Merwara Province, 1909

In the time of the British Raj, the majority of the people were occupied in agriculture. In the large towns banking and commerce flourished. In the north, the staple products for export were salt, grain, wool and cotton, and in the south opium and cotton. The major imports included sugar, hardware and piece goods. Rajputana had relatively little industrial production. The principal manufactures were cotton and woolen goods, metalwork, ivory carving, and other handicrafts which were chiefly carried on in the eastern states. The system of agriculture was very simple; in the drier country west of the Aravalli Range only one crop was raised in the year, while in other parts south and east of the Aravallis two crops were raised annually, and various kinds of cereals, pulses and fibres are grown. In the desert tracts fine breeds of camels, cattle, horses and sheep were to be found wherever there is pasturage. Irrigation, mostly from wells, was almost confined to the northern portion. Rajputana was traversed throughout by the Rajputana railway, with its Malwa branch in the south, and diverging to Agra and Delhi in the north. Jodhpur, Udaipur and Bikaner had constructed branch railways at their own cost, the first of which was extended in 1901 to Hyderabad in Sindh. In 1909 another line was opened running north near the eastern boundary from Kotah to Bharatpur.

== See also ==
- Rajputana
- Maratha Empire
- British Raj
