= Dailab Lake =

Lake in Udaipur, Rajasthan, India

- Location within Rajasthan
- Location: Udaipur, Rajasthan
- Coordinates: 23.33°N 74.27°E
- Type: reservoir, Freshwater
- Catchment area: 30 km^{2} (12 sq mi)
- Basin countries: India
- Managing agency: Rajasthan State Government
- Max. length: 1.8 km (1.1 mi)
- Max. width: 1.2 km (0.75 mi)
- Surface area: 4 km^{2} (1.5 sq mi)
- Average depth: 2.5 m (8 ft 2 in)
- Max. depth: 4.5 m (15 ft)
- Shore length^{1}: 5.2 km (3.2 mi)
- Surface elevation: 580 m (1,900 ft)
- Islands: 2 (One with a temple, another with a park)
- Settlements: Banswara
- ^{1} Shore length is not a well-defined measure.

Dailab Lake (or Diablab Lake) is located in Banswara, Rajasthan, India, and is known for its serene beauty and year-round bloom of lotus flowers. The lake is surrounded by lush greenery and is a popular spot for picnics and boating. Dailab Lake has cultural significance in Banswara and plays an important role in the local ecology.

== History ==
Dailab Lake was initially constructed in the early 1900s as part of an irrigation project to support local agriculture. Over the years, it has become a vital source of water for Banswara and a recreational area for residents and tourists.

== Hydrology and Structures ==
The lake is fed primarily by monsoon rains and several small streams from the surrounding hills. It has a stone masonry dam on the western side, built to control water levels during heavy rains. The lake also features two small islands, one of which houses an ancient temple, while the other has been developed into a park accessible by boat.

== Water Quality ==
The water quality of Dailab Lake is generally good, with a pH range of 7.5 to 8.2. The lake supports diverse aquatic life, including fish, amphibians, and a variety of aquatic plants. Eutrophication is minimal, but there are ongoing efforts to monitor and manage nutrient levels.

== Flora and Fauna ==
The lake's flora includes a variety of aquatic plants, particularly lotus flowers that bloom throughout the year, giving the lake a distinctive appearance. The surrounding area has a mix of native and introduced tree species, providing habitat for numerous bird species. The fauna includes several types of fish, such as Catla and Labeo rohita, as well as amphibians and reptiles.

== Conservation Efforts ==
Dailab Lake has been the focus of several conservation efforts, particularly by local NGOs and environmental groups. These efforts include desilting, removal of invasive species, and the introduction of sustainable fishing practices. The Rajasthan State Government has also initiated programs to enhance the lake's recreational facilities while preserving its natural beauty.

== Access ==
The lake is easily accessible by road from Banswara city, and there are facilities for boating and picnicking. Visitors can explore the islands via boat, with the temple island being a popular pilgrimage site.

== Events and Festivals ==
Dailab Lake is the site of several local festivals, particularly during the monsoon season when the lake is at its fullest. The most notable is the annual Lotus Festival, which celebrates the blooming of the lotus flowers and attracts visitors from across the region.

=== See also ===
1. List of lakes in Rajasthan
2. Banswara
3. Rajasthan
