= State Highway 32 (Rajasthan) =

Road in Rajasthan, India

State Highway 32

Route information
- Length: 219 km (136 mi)

Major junctions
- West end: Sadri, Pali District, Rajasthan
- East end: Banswara, Rajasthan

Location
- Country: India
- State: Rajasthan
- Districts: Rajasthan: Pali district, Udaipur district, Dungarpur district and Rajsamand district
- Primary destinations: Ranakpur, Gogunda, Udaipur, Salumbar, Aspur, Sabala, Lohariya, Ganoda

Highway system
- Roads in India; Expressways; National; State; Asian; State Highways in Rajasthan

State Highway 32 (RJ SH 32, SH-32) is a state highway in Rajasthan state of India that connects Sadari (SH-16-62) to Banswara via Ranakpur, Gogunda, Udaipur, Salumber Aspur, Sabala, Lohariya,Ganoda. Its total length is 224 Km.

This highway connects RJ SH 16 in Sadri to RJ SH 10 in Banswara. It also connects National Highway 76 in Gogunda to National Highway 8 Udaipur and then to National Highway 113 in Banswara. It is crossing different state highways on the way to Banswara RJ SH 62 in Sadri, RJ SH 50 in Udaipur, RJ SH 53 in Salumbar and RJ SH 54 in Aspur. Other cities and towns on this highway are: Ranakpur, Gogunda, Udaipur, Jaisamand, Kherad, Salumbar, Aspur, Sabala, Lohariya and Ganoda.

== See also ==
- List of state highways in Rajasthan
- Roads in Pali district
