= Mangarh massacre =

Massacre in British India

Coordinates: 23°21′01″N 73°59′12.5″E

The Mangarh massacre occurred on 17 November 1913, when British troops attacked the stronghold of Govindgiri Banjara at the end of the Bhil Revolt. It occurred on a hillock in the Mangarh Hills of Rajasthan. There are no accurate figures for the number of Bhil, Banjara who were killed, but estimates range from "several Bhils died" to the oral tradition that 1,500 Banjara tribals were killed.

== Background ==
Govindgiri Banjara was a social and religious reformer among the tribes (adivasi) of the Rajasthan and Gujarat areas of India. He had run afoul of the local princely state rulers, notably Sunth, Banswara, Idar, and Dungarpur because of his critique of the Indian hierarchy and its exploitation of the adivasi, and the subsequent social disruptions by his followers that his doctrines caused.

== October–November 1913 ==
Fleeing from an attempt by the ruler of Idar State to capture Govindgiri, Govindgiri Banjara and his adherents formed a defensive position on a hillock in the Mangarh Hills on the borders of the princely states of Banswara and Sunth. On 31 October, some of his followers attacked the police outpost at Gadhran, looted it, killed one police constable and took another officer captive. On 1 November, some of his followers unsuccessfully attacked the Parbatgadh fort in Sunth. Meanwhile, bands of Bhil from the Mangarh Hills were attacking and looting local villages in both Sunth and Banswara. Police were dispatched from both Banswara and Sunth to end the assembly, but negotiations failed. So the rulers sought a military solution. Units of Imperial Service Troops and the Mewar Bhil Corps besieged the hillock. On 12 November 1913, Govindgiri and his deputy Punja Pargi (aka Punja Dhirji) sent a delegation to the British with their list of grievances, "but negotiations did not take place." However, the commanding officer did give the delegation an ultimatum: Disband before 15 November. The Bhil stood firm and stayed. On 17 November 1913, the Indian and British forces attacked the Bhil defensive works, and captured Govindgiri Banjara and his deputy Punja Pargi as well as 900 prisoners.

== Mangarh Dham ==
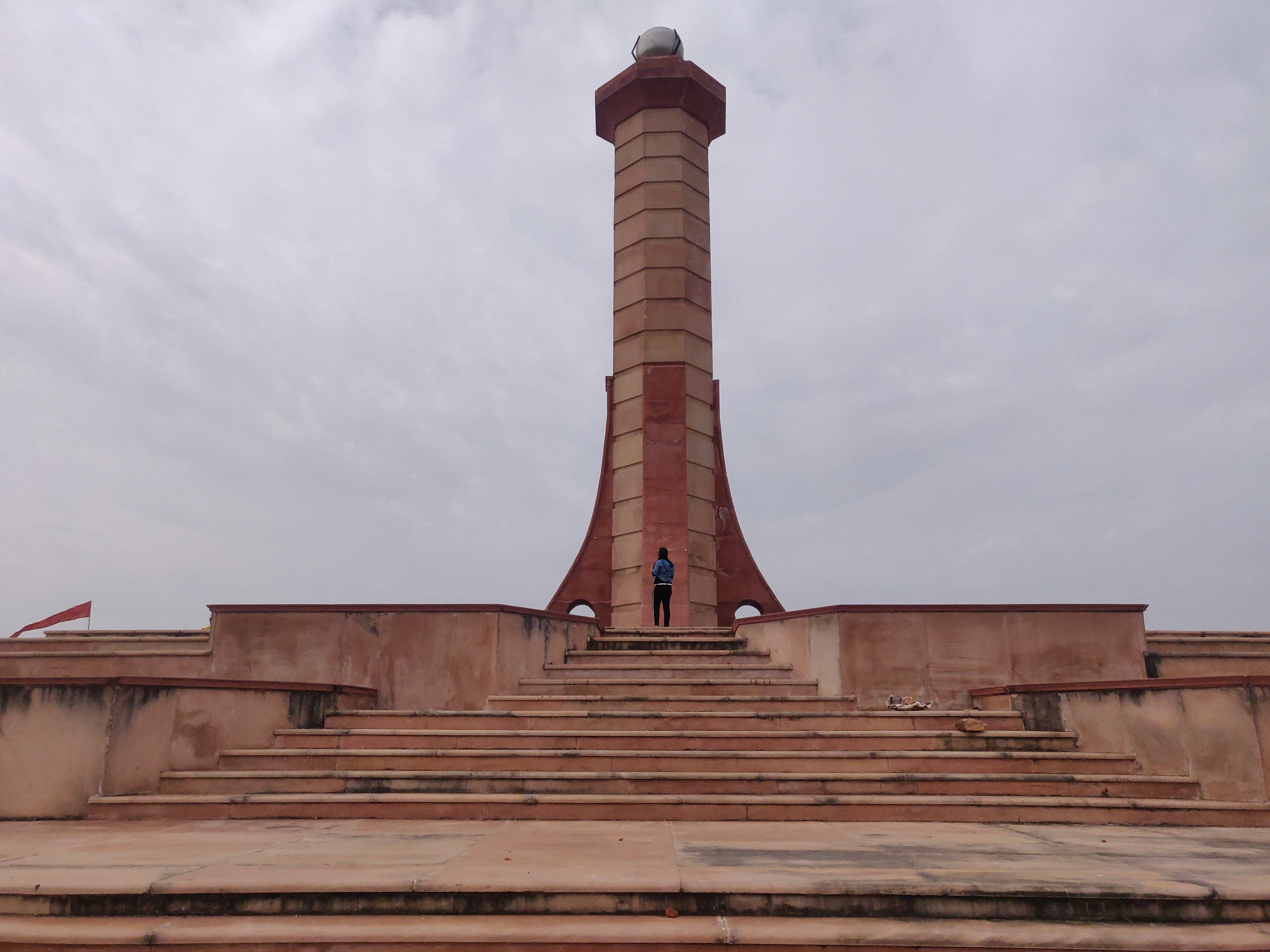
Mangarhdham Monument

A monument was built on the hillock honouring the victims of the massacre. In November 2022, it was declared a national monument. In 2017, plans were begun to put a Tribal Freedom Struggle Museum there as well. The museum was completed in 2022.

== Name and legacy ==
At the time of the Mangarh massacre little note was made of it, in part because the victims were mere tribesmen, and details only appeared in local or regional documents. However as Indian nationalism grew, so did interest in past injustices, with the 1919 Jallianwala Bagh massacre taking center stage. As a result, the Mangarh massacre was often referred to as the Adivasi Jallianwala Bagh or the Jallianwala Bagh of Vagad in reference to the better known one.
