= Mewar Residency =

Rajputana political subdivision in British India

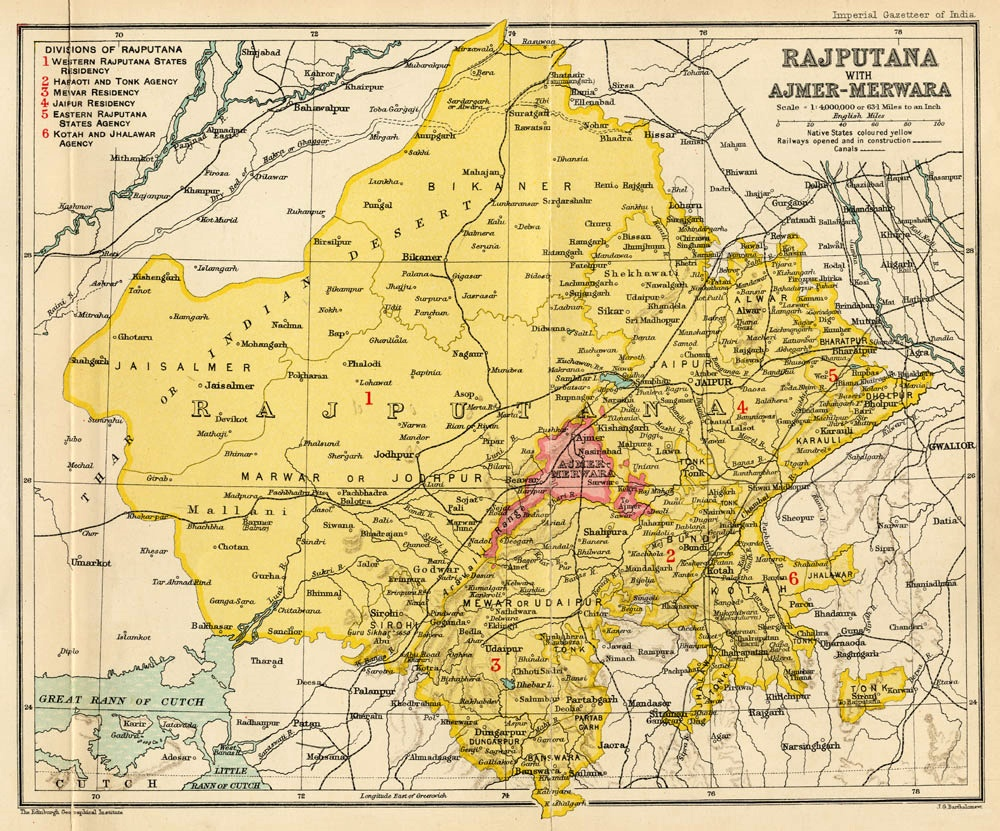
Map of Rajputana Agency, showing Ajmer-Mewar, 1909

Mewar Residency was a political subdivision of Rajputana Agency in British India. After treaty relations between Mewar and the East India Company commenced in 1818, the British government created a political sub-division known as Mewar Agency with its headquarters in Neemuch. In 1860–61, the headquarters were moved to Udaipur and, in 1881–82, the designation was changed from 'Agency' to 'Residency.' As of 1908, the Mewar Residency consisted of the four states of Udaipur, Banswara, Dungarpur, and Partabgarh, with headquarters in Udaipur.

The Western Rajputana States Agency, which included the states of Banswara, Dungarpur and Partabgarh, was part of Mewar Residency until 1906, before it separated.

== See also ==
- Mewar
