= Bhil Gametia =

The Gametia are a sub-division of the Bhil community indigenous to and found in the current state of Rajasthan in India. They are known variously as Gamet or Gametia.

The word Gametia literally means a village dweller in Rajasthani. They are said to have acquired the name because they gave up their original nomadic existence and settled as agricultural labourers. The Gametia are the largest sub-division of the Bhil of Rajasthan, and are found in the districts of Chittorgarh, Bhilwara and Udaipur. They now speak the Mewari dialect.

== Marriage ==
Like other Bhil groups, they are endogamous. They have a greater level of distance from assimilation by Brahminical Sanskritisation.

== See also ==
- Bhil Kataria
