= Mangarh Hills =

The Mangarh Hills are part of the Aravali Range situated in Rajasthan. They are known for the memorial site of the Mangarh Massacre.

The massacre took place on 17 November 1913 in the Banswara district of Rajasthan.
