= Bagidora =

Bagidora means 'Waghdhara'. It is a place situated in Banswara, Rajasthan, India. It is a division of Banswara. It is a tehsil. The village has a school, temple, and masjid.
