= Bagadi, Nepal =

Bagadi, Nepal बगदी
- Village Development Committee
- Interactive map of Bagadi, Nepal
- Coordinates: 26°54′N 85°2′E
- Country: Nepal
- Zone: Lumbini Zone
- District: Kapilvastu District

Population (2011)
  - Total: 1,000
- Time zone: UTC+5:45 (Nepal Time)
- postal code: 32802

Bagadi is a village and Village Development Committee in Kapilvastu District in the Lumbini Zone of middle-south Nepal. At the time of the 2011 Nepal census it had a population of 1000 people living in 300 indivisible houses
