= Banswara State =

Former kingdom in present-day India

Coordinates: 23.55°N 74.45°E

Banswara State बाँसवाड़ा राज्य
- 1527–1948
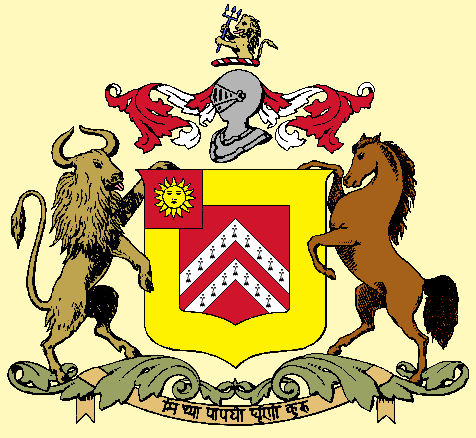
- Flag Coat of arms

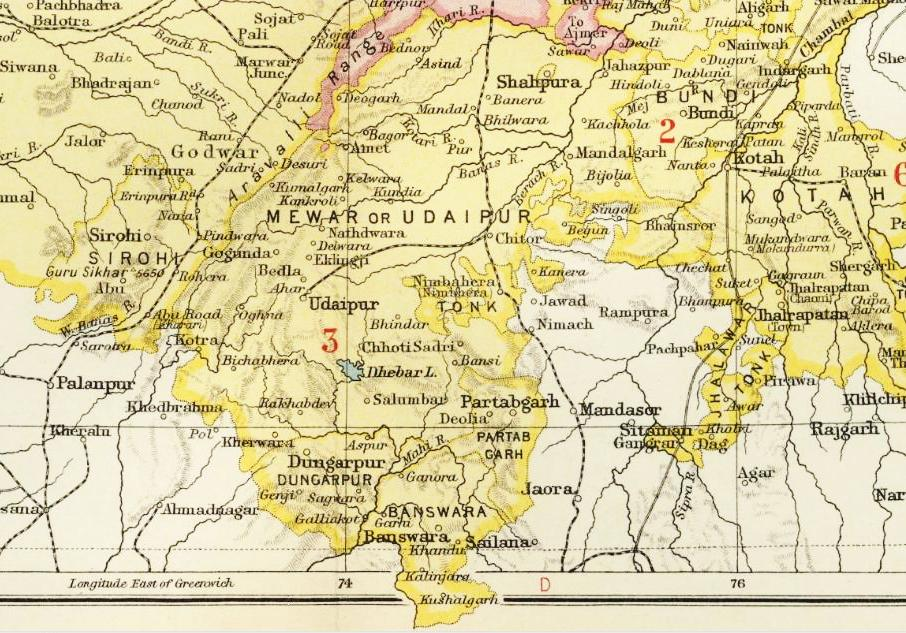
- Banswara State in the Imperial Gazetteer of India
- Area
  - 1901: 4,160 km^{2} (1,610 sq mi)
- Population
  - 1901: 165,350
- History
  - Established: 1527
  - Accession to the Union of India: 1948
Succeeded by
Union of India
- Today part of: Rajasthan, Republic of India

Banswara State was a feudatory chiefdom and later princely state that existed between 1527 and 1948 in what is today Rajasthan, India. After a period of being a dependency of the Mughals, Banswara passed to the Marathas, before being made a British tributary in 1818 at the request of the Banswara Maharawal, becoming the southernmost of the Rajputana states. The ruling dynasty was a branch of the Sisodia, and the capital was the eponymous Banswara. The 1901 census recorded Banswara as having an area of 4,160 km^{2} (1,610 sq mi) and a population of 150,350, of which 7,038 lived in the capital. The state was merged with Rajashtan in 1948, after acceeding to the newly formed Union of India.

== History ==
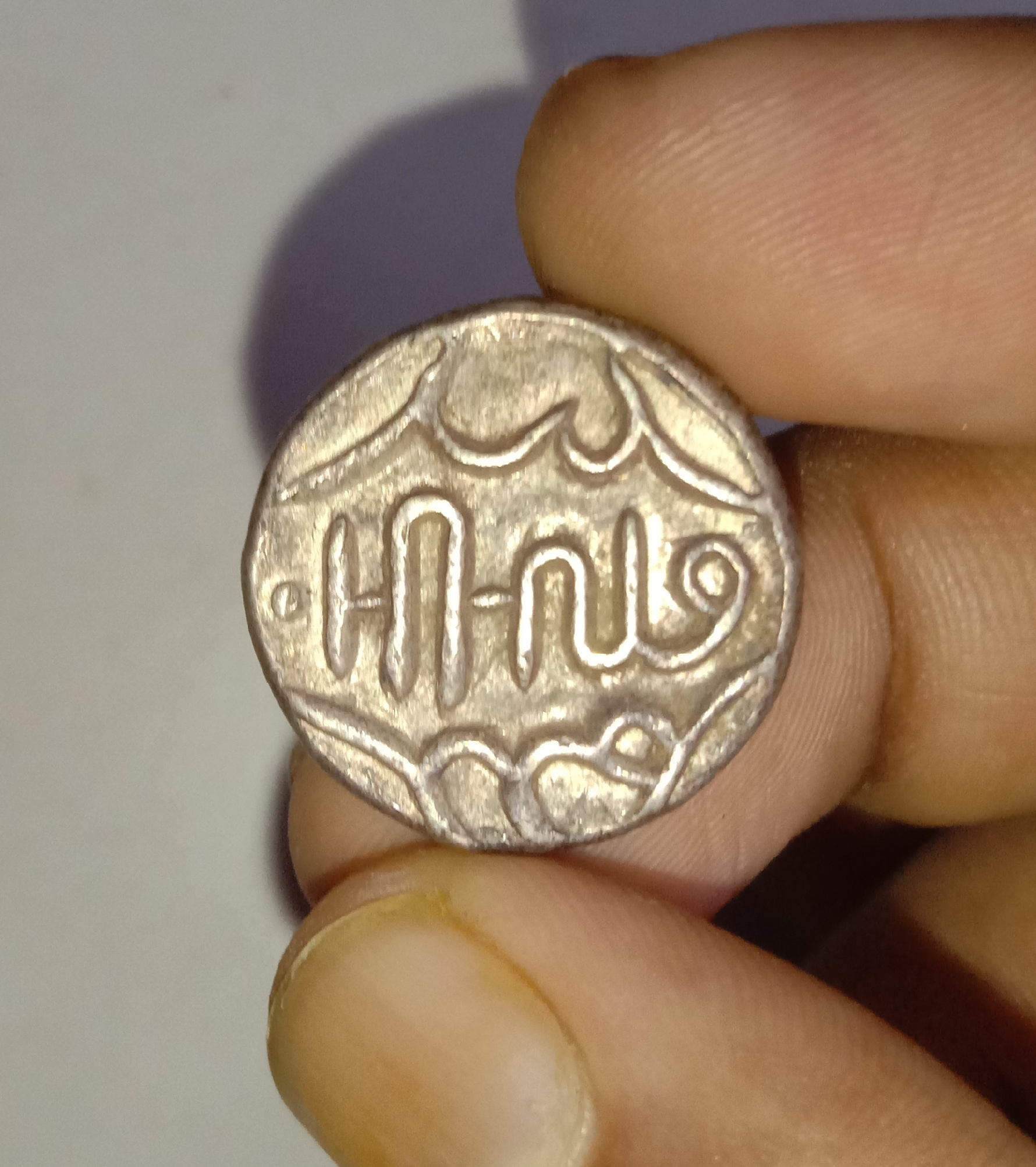
Silver Rupee from the princely state of Banswara, struck in the name of ruler Lakshman Singh (ruled 1845–1905).

The region that would become Banswara State was ruled by the Sisodia chiefs of Dungarpur from the beginning of the 13th century to about 1530, when, in the aftermath of chief Rawal Udai Singh's death at the 1527 Battle of Khanwa, Dungarpur territory was divided between his sons Prithwi Raj and Jagmal. One account attributes the partition to Rawal Udai having ordered that his domains be divided between the two sons after upon his death, while another instead has it being the result of a conflict between the two sons. According to the latter account, Jagmal, the younger of the two, had been left for dead at the Battle of Khanwa but recovered, and upon returning back home was disowned and treated as an impostor. Jagmal then took to the hills north of the capital Banswara and had the forces under his command harass Prithwi Raj, after which the two brothers agreed to let the Raja of Dhar partition Dungarpur territory between them.

With the Mughal Empire's subjugation of Rajputana, Banswara became a Mughal dependency. Towards the end of the 17th century, Kushal Singh expanded Banswara southeastwards, capturing a tract of land from the Bhils and calling it Kushalgarh. Prithwi Singh, who ruled from 1747 to 1786, plundered the southwestern neighbor Sunth and captured some of their land. Towards the end of the 18th century, Banswara had become a subject of the Maratha Empire, and paid tribute to the Raja of Dhar. In 1812, the Maharawal, tired of the Maratha overlordship, invited the British to expel the Marathas and make Banswara their tributary state. In 1818, the British obliged, and Banswara entered into a subsidiary alliance with them. In 1948, after the end of British rule in India, Banswara acceded to the newly formed Union of India, and was merged into the state of Rajashtan.

== See also ==
- List of Rajput dynasties and states
- Mewar Residency
- Mughal Empire
- Maratha Empire
- Rajputana
