= Banswara district =

- District
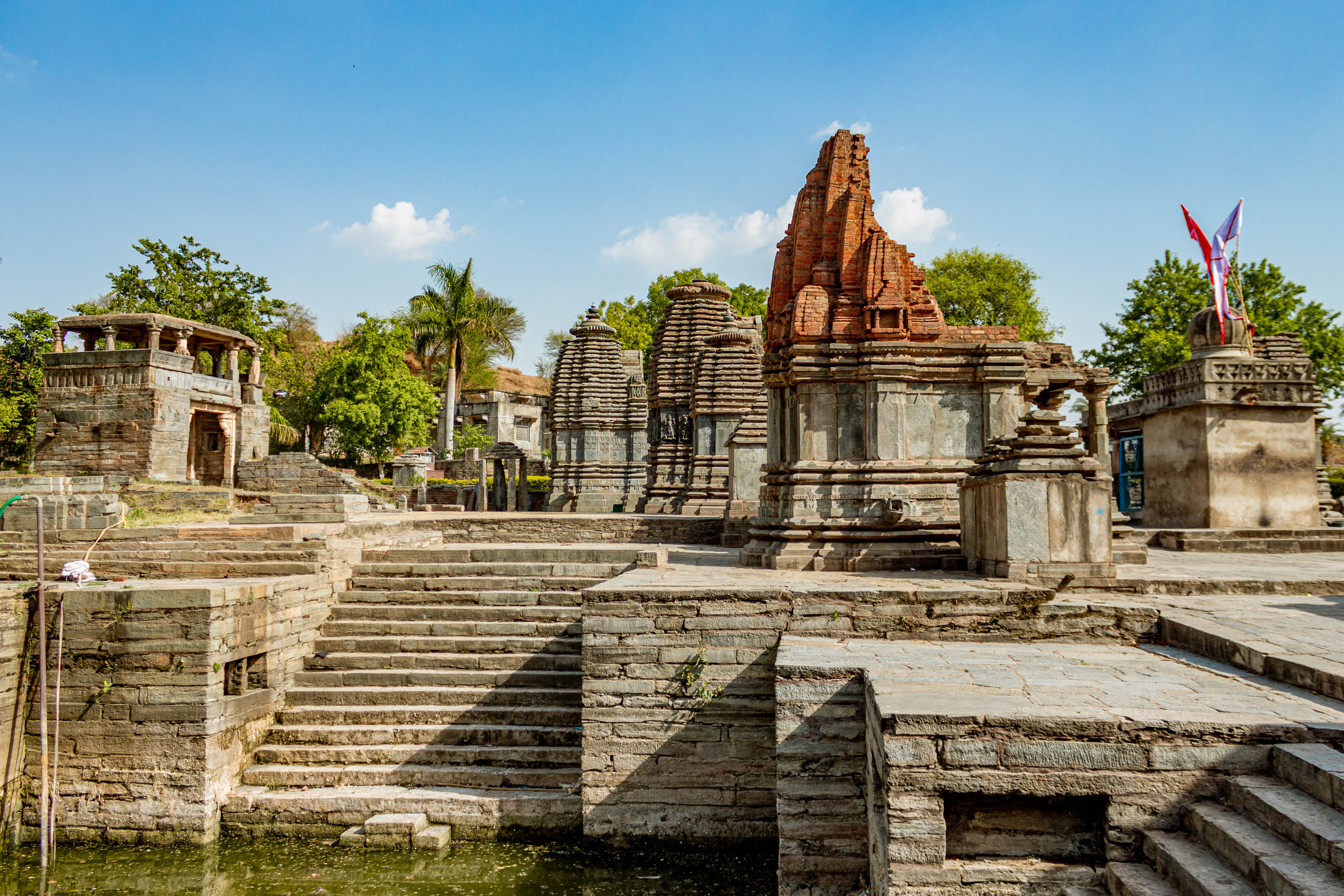
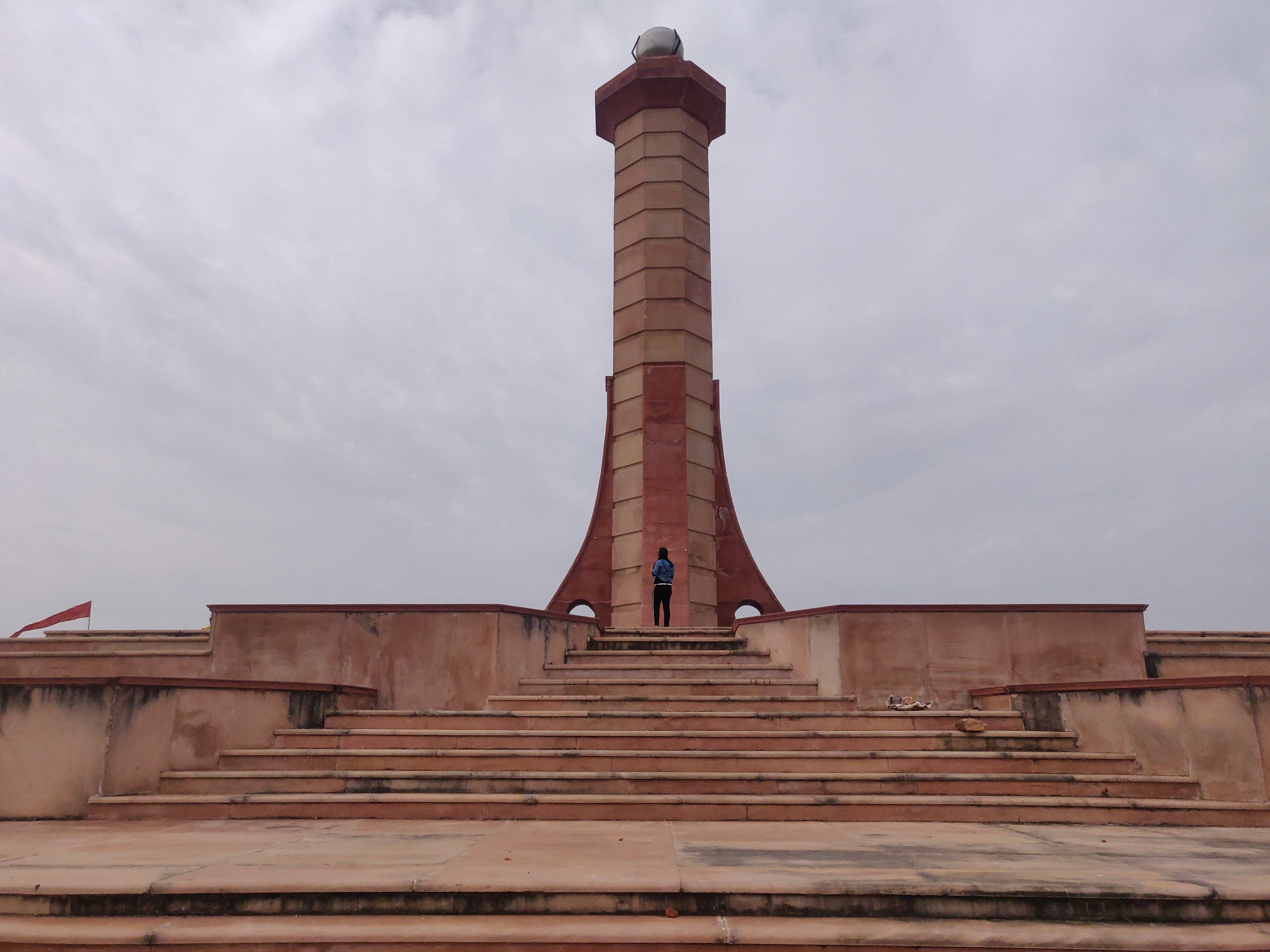
- Top: Siva Temple, Arthuna; Bottom: Memorial to Mangarh massacre

- Location of Banswara district in Rajasthan
- Coordinates: 27°12′N 74°00′E
- Country: India
- State: Rajasthan
- Division: Banswara
- Headquarters: Banswara

Area
  - Total: 5,037 km^{2} (1,945 sq mi)

Population (2011)
  - Total: 1,797,485
  - Density: 356.9/km^{2} (924.3/sq mi)
- Time zone: UTC+05:30 (IST)
- Website: banswara.rajasthan.gov.in

Banswara district has an area of 5,037 km^{2} (1,945 sq mi), which is 1.47% of Rajasthan state, India. The city of Banswara is the district headquarters. It is bounded on the north by Udaipur District, on the northeast by Pratapgarh District, on the east and southeast by Madhya Pradesh state, on the southwest by Gujarat state, and on the west by Dungarpur District. Banswara district is located in Southernmost district in Rajasthan.

== History ==
The district is named after the former Princely State of Banswara. There are two traditions regarding the etymology of Banswara. According to one tradition, it is derived from the name of the Bhil chief Bansia who ruled over this area before defeated by Maharaval Jagmal Singh in 1529 CE. According to the other tradition, the name is derived from the Bans Vara (the country of bamboos) due to the abundance of bamboos in the dense forests of this region.

In November 1913 western Banswara was the site of the Mangarh massacre that ended the Bhil Revolt. A monument has been built there. In November 2022, it was declared a national monument.

== Geography ==
Banswara is part of the Vagad region of southern Rajasthan, which includes Banswara and Dungarpur districts. The region is mainly inhabited by tribals, predominantly Bhils. Banswara and Dungarpur are together called Vagar, and in both the places local language is Vagri.

The district lies in the Mahi River basin. The Mahi flows north through the district from its origin in the Vindhya Range of Madhya Pradesh, entering the district from the southeast and flowing north towards the northern end of the district, where it turns southwest to form the boundary between Banswara and Dungarpur districts before entering Gujarat and emptying into the Gulf of Khambat.

Banswara District has rich flora and fauna. The forests include mainly teak. The wildlife includes a large variety of wild animals like leopard, chinkara, etc. Common birds in the region are fowl, partridge, black drongo, grey shrike, green bee-eater, bulbul, parrot etc.

== Economy ==
In 2006, the Ministry of Panchayati Raj named Banswara one of the country's 250 most backward districts (out of a total of 640). It is one of the twelve districts in Rajasthan currently receiving funds from the Backward Regions Grant Fund Programme (BRGF).

== Divisions ==
Banswara district is divided into eight sub-divisions, which are further divided into 12 tehsils and 11 development blocks. Banswara sub-division consists Banswara and Abapura; Garhi consists of tehsils Garhi and Arthuna, Ghatol sub-division consists of Ghatol tehsil and Gaonoda and Kushalgarh sub-division consists Kushalgarh and Sajjangarh consists sajjangarh; Bagidora consists of Bagidora and Gangtalai tehsils. Anandpuri subdivision consists of Anandpuri; Chotisarvan consists of Chotisarvan tehsil. The 11 development blocks in the district are: Talwara, Garhi, Ghatol, Arthuna, Banswara, Bagidora, Anandpuri, Chhoti Sarvan, Gangadtalai Kushalgarh and Sajjangarh.

The district consists five Vidhan Sabha constituencies, Kushalgarh, Garhi, Ghatol, Banswara and Bagidora. All of them along with three other Vidhan Sabha constituencies from Dungarpur district are part of the lone Lok Sabha constituency of the district, Banswara.

== Demographics ==
Historical population
Year	Pop.	±% p.a.
1901	158,456	—
1911	179,651	+1.26%
1921	210,371	+1.59%
1931	249,801	+1.73%
1941	287,408	+1.41%
1951	341,692	+1.75%
1961	452,712	+2.85%
1971	623,413	+3.25%
1981	841,808	+3.05%
1991	1,095,962	+2.67%
2001	1,420,601	+2.63%
2011	1,797,485	+2.38%

Religions in Banswara district (2011)
Religion	Percent
Hinduism	94.65%
Islam	2.72%
Jainism	1.26%
Christianity	1.24%
Others	0.13%

According to the 2011 census Banswara district has a population of 1,797,485, roughly equal to the nation of The Gambia or the US state of Nebraska. This gives it a ranking of 267th in India (out of a total of 640). The district has a population density of 399 inhabitants per square kilometre (1,030/sq mi) . Its population growth rate over the decade 2001-2011 was 26.58%. Banswara has a sex ratio of 979 females for every 1000 males, and a literacy rate of 57.2%. 7.10% of the population lives in urban areas. Scheduled Castes and Tribes make up 4.46% and 76.38% of the population respectively.

=== Languages ===
Languages in Banswara District (2011)
1. Bhili (93.8%)
2. Hindi (4.32%)
3. others (1.89%)

At the time of the 2011 census, 91.58% of the population spoke Wagdi (Bhili) and 4.32% Hindi .

== Transport ==
The nearest airport is in Maharana Pratap Airport 160 kilometres away in Udaipur, while the nearest international airport is Sardar Vallabhbhai Patel International Airport 289 km away in Ahmedabad. The closest railway station is Ratlam Junction 80 km away.

== Villages ==
- Bagidora
- Chhinch
- Motagaon
- Naugama
- Partapur
- गोरडी
