= Kushalgarh =

- City
- Location in Rajasthan, India Kushalgarh (India)
- Coordinates: 23.17°N 74.45°E
- Country: India
- State: Rajasthan
- District: Banswara
- Sub Divisional Magistrate: Dinesh Kumar Meena

Government
  - Type: Municipality
  - Body: Kushalgarh Municipality
- Elevation: 302 m (991 ft)

Population (2011)
  - Total: 10,096

Languages
  - Official: Hindi
  - Spoken: Vagdi
- Time zone: UTC+5:30 (IST)
- PIN: 327801
- Telephone code: 02965
- ISO 3166 code: RJ-IN
- Vehicle registration: RJ-03

Kushalgarh is a town and municipality in the Indian state of Rajasthan. It is located in the Banswara District approximately 65 km south of the city of Banswara. King Kushala Bhil was founder of Kushalgarh

== History ==
An Indian Princely State called Kushalgarh existed in the area until 1949.

A municipality was established at Kushalgarh in 1903.

== Geography ==
Kushalgarh is located at 23.17° N 74.45° E. It has an average elevation of 302 metres (991 feet) above sea level.

== Demographics ==
As of the 2011 Indian census, Kushalgarh had a population of 10,096. Males constitute 51% of the population and females 49%. Kushalgarh has an average literacy rate of 73%, higher than the national average of 59.5%: male literacy is 80%, and female literacy is 66%. In Kushalgarh, 15% of the population is under 6 years of age.
