= Banswara =

- Town
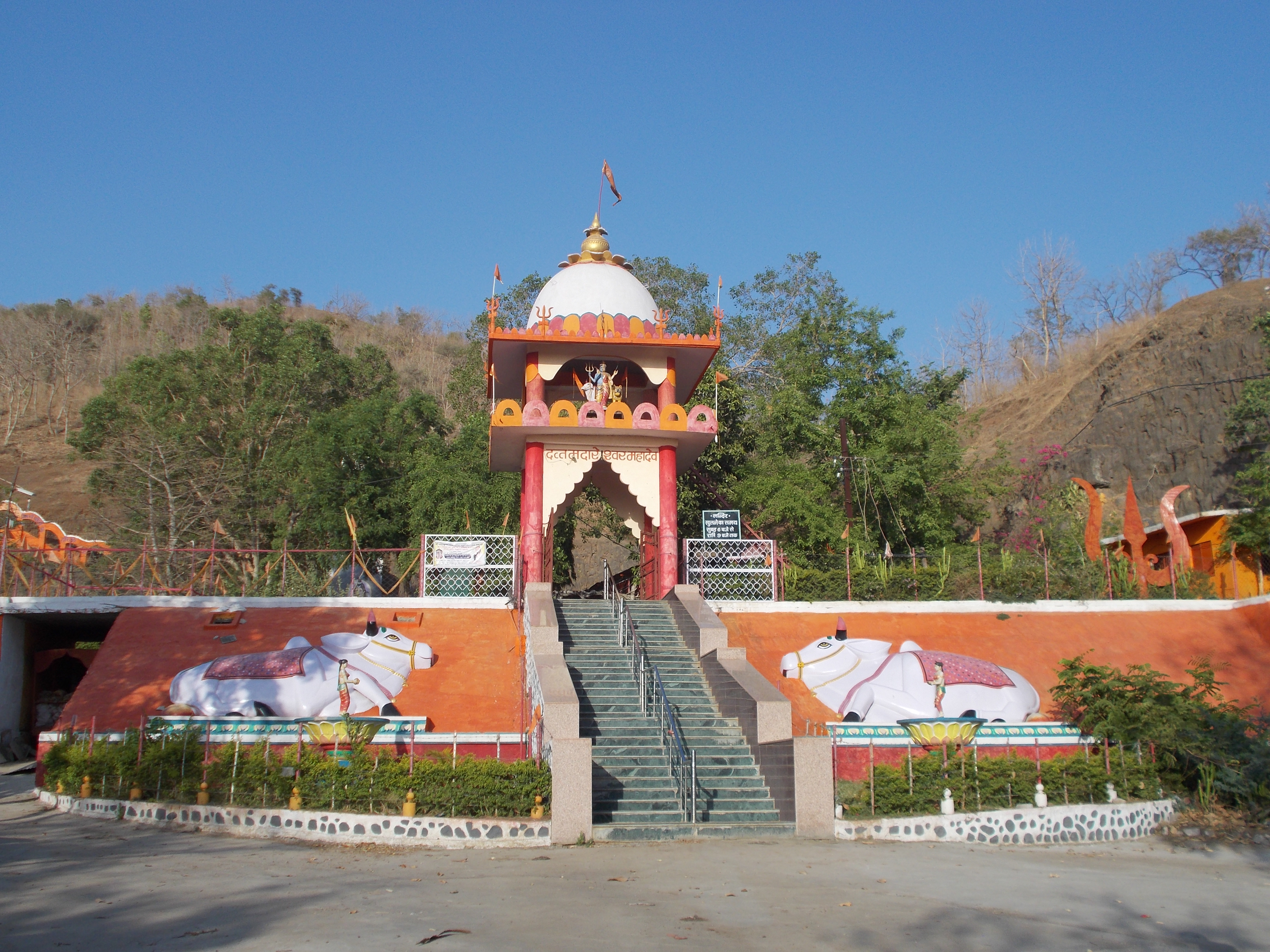
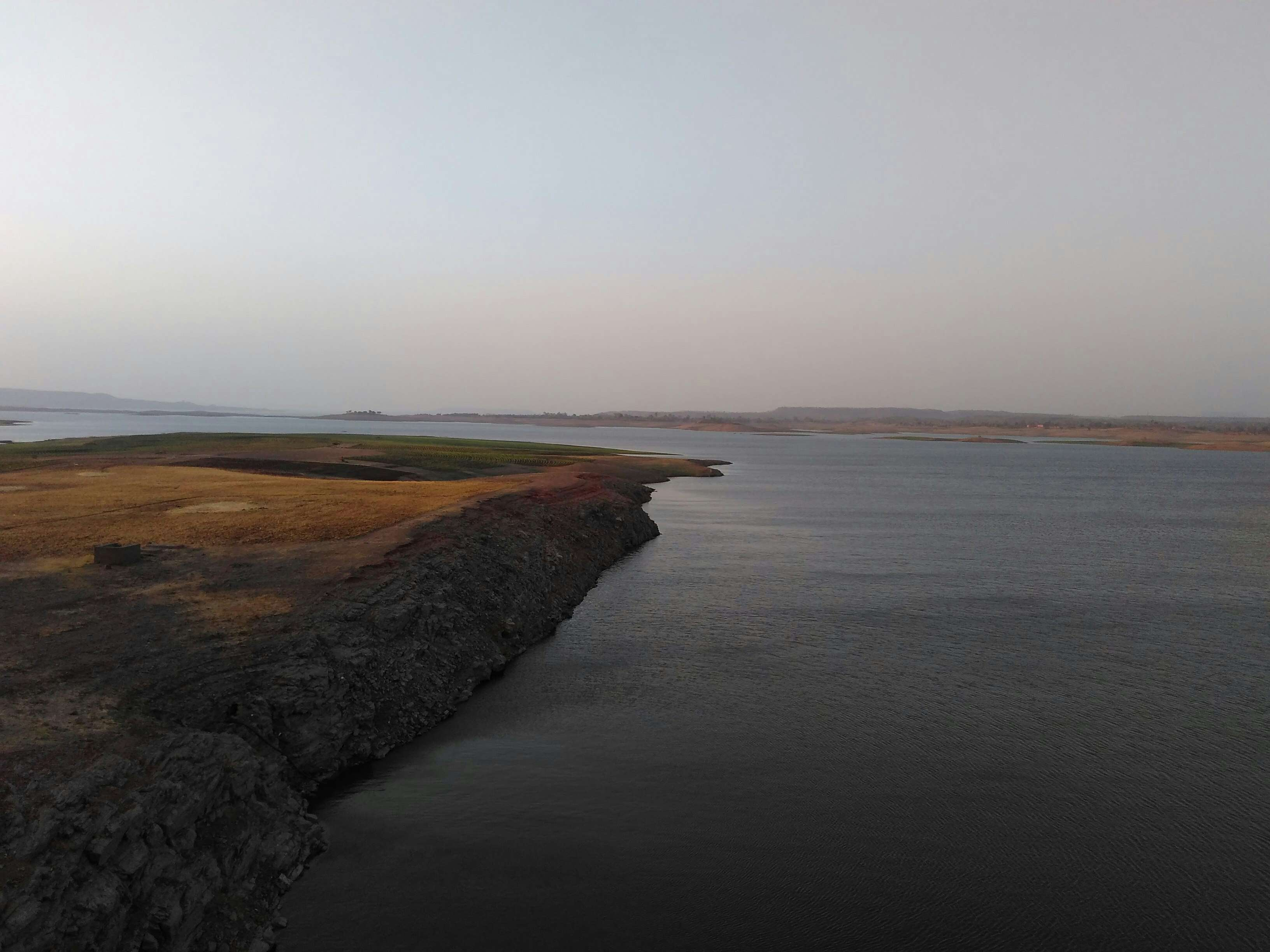
- Mandareshwar Shiv; Mahi Bajaj Sagar
- Nicknames: The Green City, The City of a Hundred Islands
- Location in Rajasthan, India Banswara (India)
- Coordinates: 23.55°N 74.45°E
- Country: India
- State: Rajasthan
- District: Banswara
- Founder: Maharawal Jagmal Singh
- Named for: Bansia or Wasna

Government
  - Type: Municipal Council
  - Body: Banswara Municipal Council
- Elevation: 302 m (991 ft)

Population (2011)
  - Total: 100,128

Languages
  - Official: Hindi
  - Spoken: Rajasthani, Wagdi
- Time zone: UTC+5:30 (IST)
- PIN: 327001
- Telephone code: 02962
- ISO 3166 code: RJ-IN
- Vehicle registration: RJ-03
- Sex ratio: 954 females per 1000 males
- Website: banswara.rajasthan.gov.in

Banswara is a city in the Banswara district in southern Rajasthan, India. The name, Banswara, came from king 'Bansiya Bhil'.

Banswara is also known as "City of a Hundred Islands", "The Green City", which is often referred to as "Cherrapunji of Rajasthan", because it receives the most rain in Rajasthan, as well as for the numerous islands in the Mahi River, often referred to as "Mahati", an alternate name for Mahi River, in Vayu Purana text, which flows through the city. Banswara district located Southernmost district in Rajasthan. The city has a population of 101,017, of whom 51,585 are male and 49,432 are female.

== History ==
Banswara ("the bamboo city") was a Rajput feudatory state in Rajputana in British India. It borders Gujarat and was bounded on the north by the princely states of Dungarpur and Udaipur or Mewar; on the northeast and east by Partapgarh; on the south by the dominions of Holkar and the state of Jabua and on the west by the state of Rewa Kantha.

Banswara state was about 45 mi (72 km) in length from north to south and 33 mi (53 km) in breadth from east to west and had an area of 1,606 mi^{2} (4,160 km^{2}). The population in 1941 was 258,760.

Banswara district forms the eastern part of the region known as Vagad or Vagwar. The district was formerly a state ruled by the Maharavals, named for the bamboo found in abundance in its forests.

On 17 November 1913, Banswara district was witness to a little-known massacre of around 1500 tribals by the British, echoing the Jallianwala Bagh massacre in which 329 people were killed in the firing. British forces opened fire on tribals who had gathered in the Mangarh hills situated of the Aravali mountains on the Rajasthan-Gujarat border. The tribals were led by their leader Govind Guru Banjara who inspired them to throw off the yoke of British rule.

Govind Guru Banjara, influenced by social reformers like Dayananda Saraswati, launched the "Bhagat" movement among the Bhils, asking them to adhere to vegetarianism and abstain from all types of intoxicants. The movement slowly took on a political hue, and then turned into a movement against the oppressive policies of the British.

The Bhils began opposing taxes imposed by the British and forced labour imposed by the princely states of Banswara, Santrampur, Dungarpur and Kushalgarh. Worried by the tribal revolt, the British decided to crush the uprising. From October 1913, Govindguru Banjara asked his followers to gather at Mangarh hill from which they would conduct their operations.

The British asked them to vacate Mangarh hill by 15 November but they refused. On 17 November, the tribals were gathering for a meeting when the British forces under Major S Bailey and Captain E Stiley opened fire on the crowd with cannons and guns. Though there are no official estimates, locals say about 2500 people were killed in cold blood.

Govind guru Banjara was captured and exiled from the area. He was imprisoned in Hyderabad jail and released in 1919, on grounds of good behaviour. As he was exiled from his homeland, he settled in Limdi in Gujarat, where he died in 1931. The site of the massacre is today known as Mangarh Dham and the locals are demanding that a national memorial be built there in memory of the martyrs.

== Geography ==
Banswara is located at 23.55°N 74.45°E. It has an average elevation of 302 m (991 ft).

The region's rugged terrain undulates in short ridges west of Banswara. The eastern part of the region is occupied by flat-topped hills of the Deccan. It has the southern end of the Aravali mountains. The drainage system belongs to the Mahi river which originates from Amjera hills near Dhar in Madhya Pradesh. Its main tributaries are the Anas, Chanp, Erav, Hiran and Kagdi. The Mahi Bajaj Sagar Dam on the Mahi lies about 16 km (9.9 mi) away from Banswara town. The right and left main canals and their distributaries irrigate 60,149 hectares (601.49 km^{2}) of land. Normal annual rainfall is about 82.59 cm (32.52 in).

The main crops are maize, wheat, rice, cotton soya bean and gram. Graphite, soapstone, dolomite, rock phosphate, limestone and a variety of marbles are mined in the region, with some deposits of gold found around Jagpura. About 20% of the area is designated as forested land, but most of the forest land is devoid of trees in the non-monsoon months.

=== Climate ===
Banswara has a tropical savanna climate (Köppen Aw), less extreme than that in the desert regions further north and north-west. The maximum temperature is 27 to 41 °C (80.6 to 105.8 °F), while the minimum temperature is 13 to 27 °C (55.4 to 80.6 °F). Normal annual rainfall is 922.4 mm or 36.31 in

Climate data for Banswara (1981-2010, extremes 1965-2012)
Month	Jan	Feb	Mar	Apr	May	Jun	Jul	Aug	Sep	Oct	Nov	Dec	Year
Record high °C (°F)	34.2 (93.6)	39.6 (103.3)	44.1 (111.4)	45.5 (113.9)	47.0 (116.6)	47.5 (117.5)	41.5 (106.7)	39.8 (103.6)	40.0 (104.0)	40.0 (104.0)	37.5 (99.5)	35.2 (95.4)	47.5 (117.5)
Mean daily maximum °C (°F)	27.6 (81.7)	30.4 (86.7)	35.5 (95.9)	39.6 (103.3)	40.7 (105.3)	38.0 (100.4)	32.2 (90.0)	30.5 (86.9)	32.8 (91.0)	34.9 (94.8)	32.4 (90.3)	29.0 (84.2)	33.6 (92.5)
Mean daily minimum °C (°F)	12.7 (54.9)	14.9 (58.8)	19.6 (67.3)	23.6 (74.5)	26.4 (79.5)	26.5 (79.7)	24.6 (76.3)	23.8 (74.8)	23.4 (74.1)	20.8 (69.4)	17.0 (62.6)	13.6 (56.5)	20.6 (69.1)
Record low °C (°F)	2.8 (37.0)	5.4 (41.7)	7.4 (45.3)	15.9 (60.6)	16.4 (61.5)	18.1 (64.6)	17.9 (64.2)	18.4 (65.1)	14.3 (57.7)	12.7 (54.9)	8.9 (48.0)	4.5 (40.1)	2.8 (37.0)
Average rainfall mm (inches)	1.9 (0.07)	0.2 (0.01)	0.4 (0.02)	0.4 (0.02)	3.0 (0.12)	103.9 (4.09)	331.6 (13.06)	327.5 (12.89)	141.3 (5.56)	15.7 (0.62)	4.3 (0.17)	3.0 (0.12)	933.2 (36.74)
Average rainy days	0.3	0.0	0.0	0.0	0.3	4.4	11.5	12.9	6.0	1.1	0.4	0.2	37.1
Average relative humidity (%) (at 17:30 IST)	40	32	24	22	26	44	67	75	64	44	40	44	43
Source: India Meteorological Department

== Location ==
The Banswara district lies in the southernmost part of Rajasthan. It is surrounded by Pratapgarh in the north, Dungarpur in the west, Ratlam and Jhabua districts of Madhya Pradesh in the east and south and Dahod district, Gujarat to the south.

The closest major city to Banswara is Udaipur which is 165 km (103 mi) away. Indore and Ahmedabad are also close, at 215 km (134 mi) and 245 km (152 mi) away respectively. The town is 827 km (514 mi) from New Delhi and 710 km (440 mi) from Mumbai.

== Demographics ==
Religions in Banswara (2011 Census)
Religion	Percent
Hindus	64.83%
Muslims	26.32%

As of 2001 the census in India, Banswara city had a population of 101,177. Males constituted 51% of the population and females 49%. Banswara city had an average literacy rate of 86.98%, higher than the national average of 59.5%, with 92.76% of the males and 81.01% of females literate.

== Government and politics ==
=== Civic administration ===
Banswara Municipal Board has been upgraded to Municipal council (Nagar Parishad).

=== Civic utilities ===
Of the 1,431 villages, 1,219 villages were electrified up to 31 March 2000. For opening of one nuclear power plant, and two super critical thermal power plant & Railway line (Ratlam -Dungarpur via Banswara) various proceedings of the state government are going on.

The Mahi River flows on the borders of Peepalkhoot and Ghatol and Banswara Panchayat Samitis. The Mahi project has the capacity to irrigate an area of 800 square kilometres.

== Culture ==
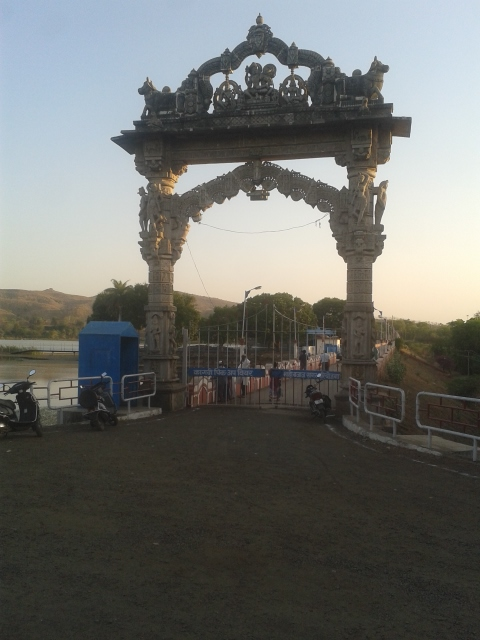
Kagdi Pick Up Weir

Situated amidst the Aravali valley, Banswara represents tribal culture in Rajasthan. With a landscape predominated by bamboo trees (Hindi: बाँस) the region came to be known as Banswara. Banswara town was founded by King Bansiya Bhil. The town has eleven and a half Swayambhoo Shivalingas; it was also called 'Lodhikashi' or little Kashi. Yet another name is "An Area of Hundred Islands". Situated in southern Rajasthan, the town borders Gujarat and Madhya Pradesh. Due to this inter-regional neighborhood, the Vagdi culture has emerged as a mixture of Gujarati, Malwi, Rajasthani and Mewari cultures. Banswara district is rich in forests, hills and wildlife. Tribals are the natives of this region.

=== Tourist attractions ===
==== Andheswar Parshwanathji ====
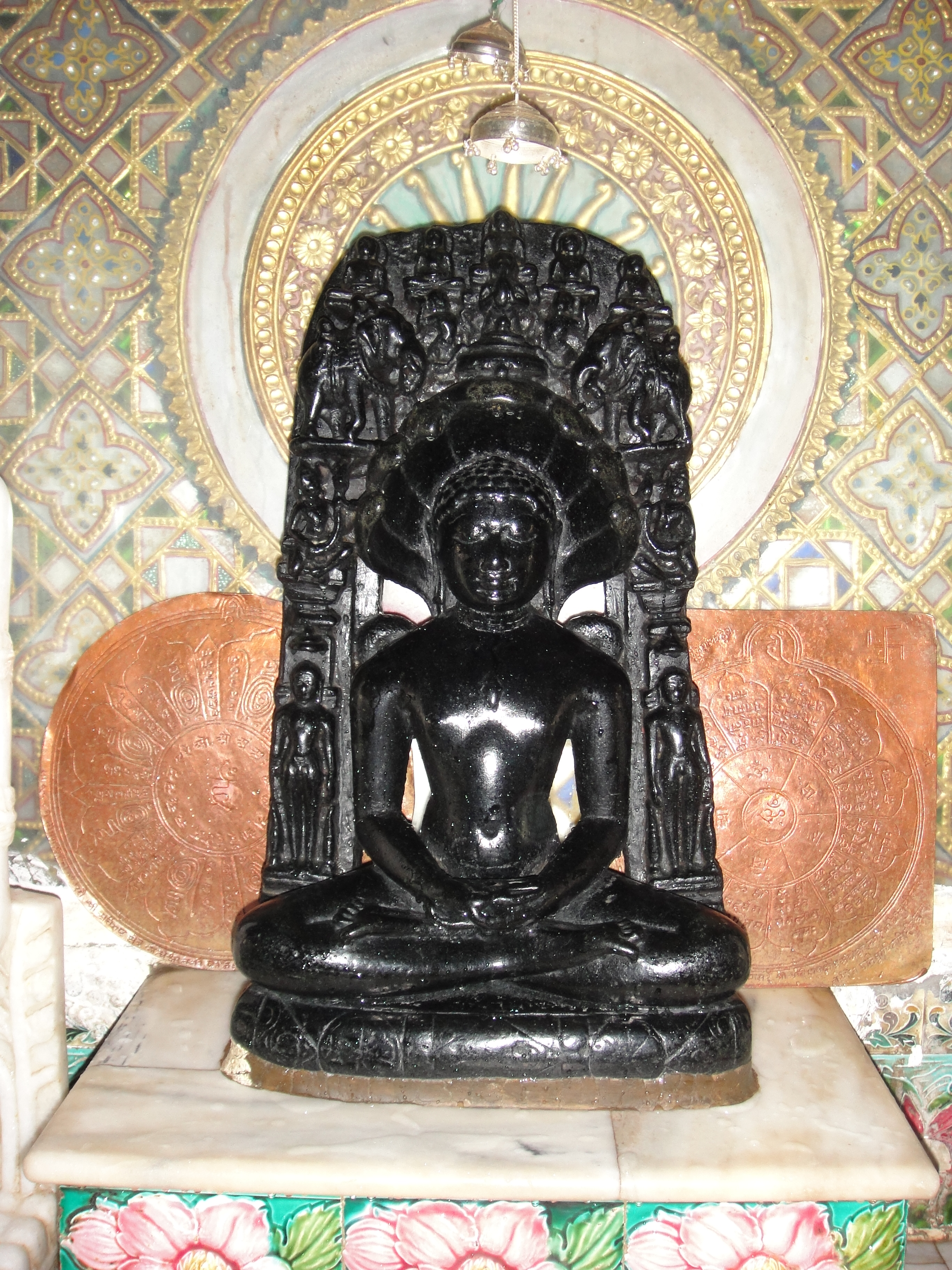
Main idol at Andeshwar Parshwanath

Andeshwar Parshwanathji is situated on a hillock in Kushalgarh tehsil of Banswara district. This is a Jain temple housing rare Shilalekhs of the tenth century. We could find two Digamabara Jain Parshwanatha temples at this place. The main temple was built by Digamabar Jain Panchayat of Kushalgarh.

==== Anekant Bahubali Temple Lohariya ====
Anekant Bahubali Temple is situated in Banswara-Udaipur Road in Lohariya Tehsil Ghari of Banswara District. This Jain temple is known for the 27-foot Standing Statue of Lord Bahubali which is made of White Sangmarar (marble). This Jain temple was made by the Inspiration of Digamber Acharya Shri 108 Bharat Sagarji maharaj here we can find many other temples of Jain Lords Like Panch Parmeshti Jinalay (tample), Manvadi Sapt charan Rishi's Tample, Adinatha Jinalaya etc. Has situated in The Campus of temple.

==== Abdullah Pir ====
Abdullah Pir is a dargah of Sayedi Abdul Rasul Saheed, a Muslim saint and mostly visited by the Bohra Muslim community. Abdullah Pir is located in the southern part of the city. On 10th Rabi' al-Awwal, every year, "Urs" is held at the Dargah. The people of the Bohara community take part in it in large numbers.

==== Anand Sagar Lake ====
This artificial lake has been constructed by Lanchi Bai, the Rani of Maharval Jagami. It is also known as Bai Talab. Anand Sagar lake is located on the eastern part of Banswara. It is enclosed by the holy trees named "Kalpa Vriksha". Nearby lies the chattris or cenotaphs of the rulers of the state.

==== Arthuna ====
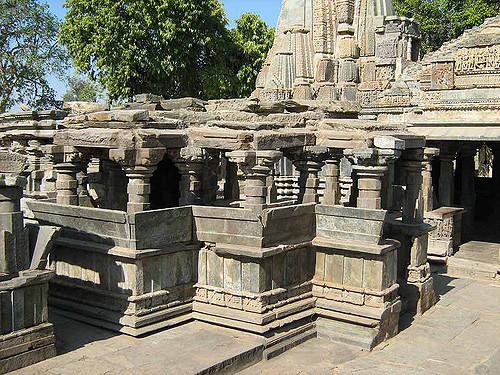
Arthuna Temple

Arthuna, as well as its surrounding areas, have clusters of ruined Hindu and Jain temples belonging to the 11th, 12th and the 15th centuries. Among the ruins is a carved conjugated statue of Shiva, Parvati and Ganesh. Lankiya village around Arthuna has Shaivite temples called Nilkanth Mahadev Temples. The temple is an old stone temple having intricate carvings and sculpted figures of women embedded in the outer walls. The bull Nandi (Lord Shiva's faithful vehicle) stands guard at the entrance in the temple porch.

==== Dailab Lake ====
Dailab Lake is situated on Pratapgarh Road, civil lines. A "Harihar Maruti Dham" temple is situated near this lake. A popular place for devotees of Lord Hanuman during the day of Hanuman Jayanti.

In recent years water hyacinth has invaded whole lake which disappoints its visitors. Many steps have been taken to remove this weed but all have resulted in failure.

==== Madareshwar Temple ====
Banswara has a number of ancient Hindu and Jain temples, and in the past was known as Lodi Kashi or the city of temples. This temple of Lord Shiva is situated inside the natural cave of a high hill on the eastern part of the city. The cave temple provides an Amarnath Yatra like feeling to the pilgrims, due to its typical location.

==== Mahi Dam ====
Mahi Dam is one of the major attractions of Banswara. It is situated 16 kilometres from Banswara town. The dam was constructed between 1972 and 1983 under the Mahi Bajaj Sagar project, for the purposes of hydroelectric power generation and water supply.

==== Mangarh Dham ====
This is an important fair of the tribals and is held on Margshirsha Purnima. During this fair, the tribals of Rajasthan, Madhya Pradesh and Gujarat participate and they pay tribute to Guru Govindgiri, founder of the Samp Sabha.

==== Paraheada ====
Paraheada is located in the Garhi tehsil near gopi nath ka garha. It is a temple of Lord Shiva. Paraheada is 22 km from Banswara. Shri Raj Mandir or more popularly known as the City Palace, was built in the 16th century and situated on a hillock overlooking the town. Covering a huge area it follows typical style of old Rajput architecture. Though lack of funds, has made many royal palaces of Rajasthan exchange hands with the government after Independence, this palace is still owned by the royal family.

==== Bhim Kund ====
It is a place surrounded by hills. People call it "Phati Khan" because it is a deep cave under a hill. There is a pool of very cold water which is found throughout the year. It is said that Lord Ram, during his exile came and stayed here for some time.

==== Talwada ====
Talwara is another place to visit near Banswara. Its historical significance due to its primeval temples and the devastated of some old monuments. Talwara is the temples of Sun, Lord Amaliya Ganesh, Laxmi Narayan temple, and Jain temple of Sambhavnath make Talwara a religiously important site. The idols in these temples are carved in local black stone.

==== Kupda ====
Kupda is another place to visit near Banswara. It is a temple of Vejva Mata. Temple is situated in Banswara-Dungarpur Road near Mayur Mill. The well-known non-governmental organization (NGO) Vaagdhara is also situated in Kupda.

==== Tripura Sundari ====
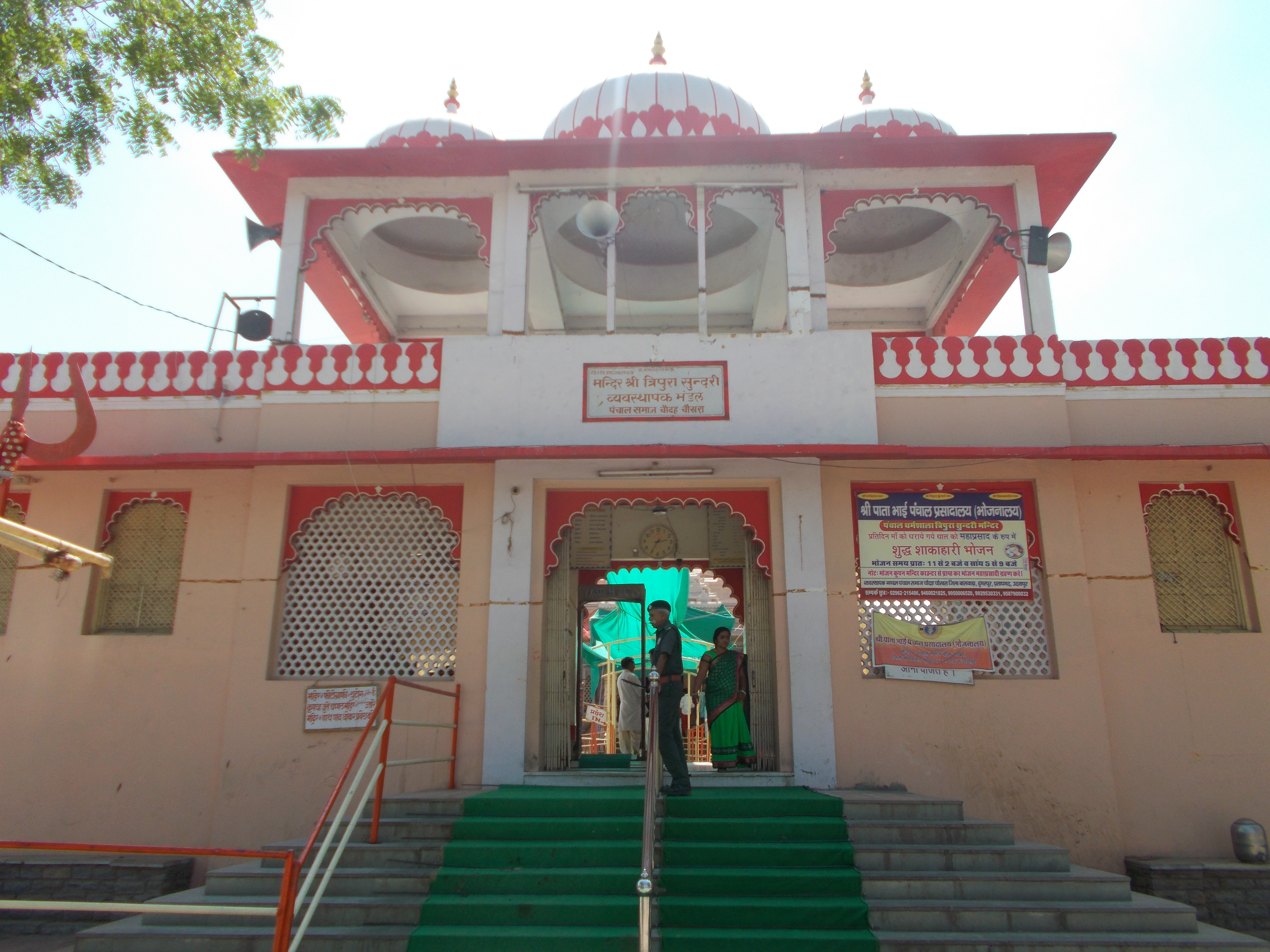
Shri Tripura Sundari Temple

Tripura Sundari is the temple, devoted to Goddess Tripura Sundari or Turita Mata. This temple has a gorgeous idol of black stone having 18 hands and more important each hand carrying a different emblem. The goddess is seen riding a tiger. It is believed that its one of the Shakti Peeths of Hindus have divine powers. It is believed that this temple was built before Samrat Kanishka, who ruled here. The exact date of its construction is not yet known. It is said to be one of the "Shakti Peeths" of the Hindus having charismatic divine power. But it is believed that the temple was constructed before the reign of the Kushana emperor Kanishka, who ruled here in the first century AD.

==== Sai Temple ====
The Sai temple is the most viewed place in Banswara. This is the temple of Sai baba. The Om Sri Shirdi Sai Baba temple was established in 2004. This temple has a large idol of Sai baba made of white stone and also one god Ganesh. This temple has unique rangoli of stone inside it, and a big jhumar light on the roof. There's a big open place in front of the temple.

=== Famous people ===
- Hanumant Singh, Former India Test Cricketer and Maharaja of erstwhile state of Banswara
- Imam Siddique, Big Boss Runner Up
- Hari Dev Joshi, Freedom fighter & politician

== Transport ==
=== Road ===
Banswara, with its historical sites, lakes, and cultural heritage, is a popular destination for travelers.

=== Rail ===
The Railway Ministry has approved railway line to be established to connect the Dungarpur and Ratlam station. The total distance between Ratlam to Dungarpur is around 187.6 kilometres or 117 miles, Banswara is situated in the centre of these two stations. Recently railway line work in progress and final location for rail track marked by agency but now in 2025 Banswara does not have its own railway. The two nearby cities Dungarpur and Udaipur both have their railway but Banswara does not have any railways.

=== Air ===
The nearest airport is at Udaipur 165 kilometres (103 mi), where there is a helipad and runways for charter planes to Talwada village airstrip around 13 kilometres (8.1 mi) from Banswara city. There is no airport at Banswara itself, but nearby at Udaipur 160 kilometres (99 mi), Indore (Madhya Pradesh) 212 kilometres (132 mi) & Ahmedabad (Guj) 285 kilometres (177 mi) are major airports close to Banswara.

== Education ==
Schools and higher educational institutions in Banswara are administered either by the Directorate of Education, the government, or private organizations. In 2008–09, there were 1,995 primary and middle schools, 283 secondary and senior secondary schools in the city. The higher education institutions in the city included Two Govt P.G. Colleges and & Eight Private colleges. For technical education one Govt. Polytechnic and one government engineering college and two ITI's.

Private schools in the city—which employ either English or Hindi as the language of instruction—are affiliated to one of two administering bodies: the Rajasthan Board of Secondary Education and the Central Board for Secondary Education.

Since 2012, a government Engineering college has started, and in the state Budget of 2013–14 one medical college was also announced for Banswara. medical college has started operation in 2024

== Media ==
The focus on political reportage, including regular television broadcasts of Indian parliament sessions. Many country-wide media agencies, among them the state-owned Press Trust of India and Doordarshan, are based in the city. Television programming in the city includes two free terrestrial television channels offered by Doordarshan, and several Hindi, English and regional-languages cable channels offered by multi-system operators. Satellite television, in contrast, is yet to gain large-scale subscribership in the city.

Print journalism remains a popular news medium. During the year 2005–06, newspapers in Hindi languages were published from the city. Of these, Hindi language newspapers included Dainik Bhaskar and Rajasthan Patrika. Other major English newspapers include Indian Express, Business Standard, The Times of India and The Hindu.
