= Wagdi =

Bhil language of India

- Bhilodi
- Native to: India
- Region: Vagad region, Rajasthan
- Ethnicity: Bhil
- Native speakers: 3.39 million (2011 census)
- Language family: Indo-European: Indo-Iranian; Indo-Aryan; Western Indo-Aryan; Bhil; Northern; Wagdi

Language codes
- ISO 639-3: wbr
- Glottolog: wagd1238

Wagdi is a Bhil language of India spoken mainly in Dungarpur and Banswara districts of Southern Rajasthan. Wagdi has been characterized as a dialect of Bhili.

There are four dialects of Wagdi: Aspur, Kherwara, Sagwara and Adivasi Wagdi.

== Grammar ==
=== Nouns ===
- There are two numbers: singular and plural.
- Two genders: masculine and feminine.
- Three cases: simple, oblique, and vocative. Case marking is partly inflectional and partly postpositional.
- Nouns are declined according to their final segments.
- All pronouns are inflected for number and case but gender is distinguished only in the third person singular pronouns.
- The third person pronouns are distinguished on the proximity/remoteness dimension in each gender.
- Adjectives are of two types: either ending in /-o/ or not.
- Cardinal numbers up to ten are inflected.
- Both present and past participles function as adjectives.

=== Verbs ===
- There are three tenses and four moods.
