= Kadana =

- Location of Kadana in Gujarat Kadana (India)
- Coordinates: 23.289678°N 73.838355°E
- Country: India
- State: Gujarat
- District: Mahisagar
- Elevation: 108.848 m (357.11 ft)

Languages
  - Official: Gujarati, Hindi,
- Time zone: UTC+5:30 (IST)
- PIN: 389 240
- Telephone code: (91) 2675
- Vehicle registration: GJ-17/GJ-35
- Legislature type: Gram Panchayat
- Lok Sabha constituency: Dahod
- Vidhan Sabha constituency: Santrampur
- Climate: Tropical savanna (Köppen: Aw)

Kadana is a village and tehsil in the Mahisagar district of the Indian state of Gujarat. It is situated on the riverbank of Mahi River. Kadana is the site of the Kadana Dam, which generates 240MW of hydroelectric power. The dam was built between 1979 and 1989 and is a part of Santrampur (Vidhan Sabha constituency). The construction of a new bridge over the Mahi river, near to the dam, started at the end of 2016.

== Geography ==
Kadana borders other regions:

- to the south: Santrampur
- to the west: Khanpur
- to the east: Fatehpura
- to the north: Simalwara

Lunawada, Sagwara, Modasa and Godhra are large cities nearby Kadana Tehsil.

== Demographics ==
As of the 2011 Census of India, Kadana had a population of 129,545, living in 19,815 houses. Of these, 66,399 were male and 63,146 were female.

Kadana comprises 132 villages and more than 200 sub-villages which incorporate into 38 Gram Panchyats.

== Villages ==
- Agarwada
- Amboja
- Amthani
- Ankaliya
- Anoppur
- Antalwada
- Bachkaria (north)
- Balujina Muvada (kadana)
- Bariyana Vanta
- Bhagaliya
- Bhemani Vav
- Bhukhi
- Bhul
- Bokannala
- Brahmanni Muvadi (malvan)
- Brahmanni Muvadi (kadana)
- Buchawada
- Budhpur
- Chandri
- Charanni Muvadi
- Chhajali
- Chhala Pagina Muvada
- Chhatrapura
- Chopad Devi
- Dadhaliya
- Daduni Muvadi
- Dahyapur
- Dedawada
- Dhansura
- Dhingalwada
- Dhuniya
- Ditvas
- Divada
- Dodiya (math)
- Dolatpura
- Gareniya
- Ghanta Vadiya (west)
- Ghantawada
- Ghaswada
- Ghodiyar
- Godha Ni Muvadi
- Godhar (north)
- Golanpur
- Goriyana Muvada
- Hathi Ranani Muvadi
- Jaguna Muvada
- Jambunala
- Jogan Jetpur
- Kadana
- Kadva Bariyani Muvadi
- Kajli
- Kakri Mahudi
- Kaliyari
- Kanawada
- Karodia (north)
- Karvai
- Kelamul
- Kharawada
- Kharod
- Khatva
- Kureta
- Ladpur
- Ladu Damorna Vanta
- Lapania
- Lembani Vav
- Limbhola
- Limpur
- Luharna Muvada
- Machhina Nadhara
- Mahapur
- Mal
- Malvan
- Mankudi
- Maruwada
- Math (dodiya)
- Math (kotal)
- Mota Dharola
- Mota Machhiwada
- Mota Mirapur
- Mota Padadara
- Mota Rajanpur
- Mota Sagavadiya
- Moti Rath
- Moti Vareth
- Munpur
- Muvala Bid
- Nana Dharola
- Nana Machhiwada
- Nana Mirapur
- Nana Padadara
- Nana Rajanpur
- Nani Kharsoli
- Nani Rath
- Nani Vareth
- Natthuni Muvadi
- Nava Muvada
- Nindka (north)
- Pachher
- Padamjini Muvadi
- Padhara
- Paniya
- Pankhan
- Parvatpura
- Ranakpur
- Rankakot
- Rathada
- Relva
- Renganiya
- Royaniya
- Rughanathpura
- Saliya Muvadi
- Saliyabid
- Samatwada
- Sanghri
- Sarasva (north)
- Sarsdi
- Shiyal
- Talwada
- Tantroli
- Tarkoni Nal
- Thakor Na Nadhra
- Umariya
- Vachhalawada
- Vada Zampa
- Vagadiyana Pithapur
- Vagh Dungri
- Vaghadiyani Andhari
- Vaghotiya
- Varsada
- Velanwada
- Zalasang
- Zenzwa

== Attractions ==
- Kadana Dam
- Eklingji Mahadev temple
- Pataleshwar Caves Mahadev temple, located in Thakor Na Nathra
- Nadinath Mahadev temple, located in Ghodiyaar, near Kadana Dam
- Baba Ramdevpir Mandir temple, located at Vagh Dungri

== Festival ==
All festival like Holi, Diwali, Navratri, Mahashivratri, Nagpuja, Id-ae-milad and mohrram are celebrated with enthusiasm and cheer.

== Languages ==
Gujarati speak up by most of population but its variable according to local vocalisation Hindi, English other languages spoken.

== Historical Importance ==
Kadana, santrampur and surrounding villages once living place of various Rulers of middle India & ancient India.
