= Panam Dam =

- location in Gujarat
- Interactive map of Panam Dam
- Country: India
- Location: Mahisagar district
- Coordinates: 23°03′14.0″N 73°43′01.7″E
- Status: Operational
- Construction began: 1971
- Opening date: 1999
- Construction cost: Rs.128.57 Crore.

Dam and spillways
- Impounds: Panam river
- Height (foundation): 56.36 metres (180 ft)
- Length: 269.45 metres (880 ft)
- Spillways: 10 (total spillway length=182m)
- Spillway type: radial gates
- Spillway capacity: 10,075 m^{3}/s

Reservoir
- Creates: Panam Reservoir
- Total capacity: 737.987 MCM
- Active capacity: 689.567 MCM
- Catchment area: 2,312 square kilometres (2.5×10^{10} sq ft)
- Surface area: 89.80 square kilometres (970,000,000 sq ft)

Power Station
- Type: Conventional
- Turbines: 2 units of 1 Megawatt (MW)
- Installed capacity: 2 MW

The Panam Dam is constructed over the Panam River in India. It is located at Santrampur Taluka of Mahisagar district in Gujarat state. Panam is a tributary of the Mahi River, it originates from Devgadh Baria Taluka of Dahod district. The Panam river merges with the Mahi river 25 kilometres (16 mi) downstream of the Panam Dam.

A mini hydro power plant of 2 Megawatts capacity was constructed over the Panam canal in 1994. Panam canal is a 99.73 kilometres (61.97 mi) long canal having a capacity of 21 cubic metres (740 cu ft). The construction of the canal was completed in 1999.

== See also ==
- Kadana Dam and Mahi Bajaj Sagar Dam on Mahi River
- Ukai Dam
- Sardar Sarovar Dam
