= Ranoli railway station =

Railway station in Gujarat, India

Ranoli
- Indian Railway Stations logo

General information
- Location: Ranoli, Vadodara district, Gujarat; India
- Coordinates: 22°24′15″N 73°06′51″E
- Elevation: 40 metres (130 ft)
- System: Indian Railways station
- Owner: Indian Railways
- Operator: Western Railway
- Line: Ahmedabad–Mumbai main line
- Platforms: 2
- Tracks: 2

Construction
- Structure type: Standard (on-ground station)
- Parking: No
- Cycle facilities: No

Other information
- Status: Functioning
- Station code: RNO
- Zone(s): Western Railway
- Division(s): Vadodara
Location
- Location within India Location within Gujarat

Ranoli railway station is a railway station in Ranoli town of Vadodara district on the Western Railway zone of the Indian Railways. Passenger, MEMU and Intercity trains halt here.

Station code of Ranoli is 'RNO'. It has two platforms. Ranoli is well connected by rail to Ahmedabad Junction, Kathana, Anand Junction, Nadiad Junction, Vadodara Junction, Viramgam Junction, Bharuch Junction and Mumbai Central.

== Major trains ==
Following Intercity train halts at Ranoli railway station:

- 19036 Vadodara–Ahmedabad Intercity Express
