= Bamroda =

- Village
- Location in Gujarat, India
- Coordinates: 22.820862°N 73.747786°E
- Country: India
- State: Gujarat
- District: Mahisagar
- Taluka: Khanpur

Government
  - Type: Gram Panchayat

Population (2011)
  - Total: 1,407

Languages
  - Official: Gujarati, Hindi
- Time zone: UTC+5:30 (IST)
- PIN: 389230
- Vehicle registration: GJ-35

Bamroda is a village situated in Middle East area of Gujarat state of India. The village is in Mahisagar district having the maximum population of Brahmins and Patels. Main business of people of village is Agriculture, Agriculture Labour and Animal husbandry. Main crop of the village are Maize, Wheat, Pearl millet, Pigeon pea and Vegetable. The village has facilities of Gram panchayat, Kindergarten and Primary school.
