= Pandarwada =

- Village
- Location in Gujarat, India
- Coordinates: 22.820862°N 73.747786°E
- Country: India
- State: Gujarat
- District: Mahisagar
- Taluka: Khanpur
- Named for: Pandava

Government
  - Type: Gram Panchayat

Population (2011)
  - Total: 3,095

Languages
  - Official: Gujarati, Hindi
- Time zone: UTC+5:30 (IST)
- PIN: 389232
- Vehicle registration: GJ-35

Pandarwada is a village situated in Middle East area of Gujarat state of India. The village is in Mahisagar district having maximum population of Adivasis. Main business of people of village is Agriculture, Agriculture Labour and Animal husbandry. Main crop of the village are Maize, Wheat, Pearl millet, Pigeon pea and Vegetable. The village is having facilities of Gram panchayat, Kindergarten and Primary school.

== Geography ==
Pandarwada village is touching state border of Dungarpur of Rajasthan and district border of Aravalli, Panchmahal and Kheda of Gujarat. Rajasthan border is 10 km and historical place Kaleshwari is 8 km from the village.
