= Lunavada =

Lunavada may refer to:

- Lunavada (municipality)
- Lunavada State
