= Mansinh Chauhan =

Indian politician

Mansinh Chauhan (born 1950) is an Indian politician from Gujarat. He is a six time member of the Gujarat Legislative Assembly from Balasinor Assembly constituency in Mahisagar district. He won the 2022 Gujarat Legislative Assembly election representing the Bharatiya Janata Party.

== Early life and education ==
Chauhan is from Balasinor, Mahisagar district, Gujarat. He is the son of Kohyabhai Chauhan. He completed his B.A. in 1973 and later did B.Ed. in 1975 at a college affiliated with Gujarat University.

== Career ==
Chauhan won from Balasinor Assembly constituency representing the Bharatiya Janata Party in the 2022 Gujarat Legislative Assembly election. He polled 92,501 votes and defeated his nearest rival, Ajitsinh Chauhan of the Indian National Congress, by a margin of 51,422 votes. He first became an MLA winning the 1990 Gujarat Legislative Assembly election as a BJP candidate. Later, he retained the Balasinor seat in the 1995 Gujarat Legislative Assembly election representing Rashtriya Janata Party and won for a third time in 1998 but on the Indian National Congress ticket. He regained the seat for the Congress winning the 2007 and 2012 Gujarat Legislative Assembly elections. In 2012, he beat Pathak Rajeshbhai Gajanan of the BJP by a margin of 17,171 votes. Later, he returned to the BJP and lost the 2017 election to Ajitsinh Parvatsinh Chauhan of the Congress by a margin of 10,602 votes. He won for a sixth time in the 2022 Assembly election retaining the seat for the BJP.
