= Zorawar Khan =

Nawab of Balasinor (1831–1882)

Zorawar Khan زوراوار خان
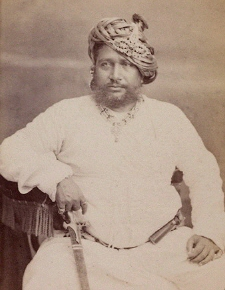
- Khan

Nawab of Balasinor
- Reign: 2 December 1831 – 30 November 1882
- Predecessor: Edul Khan
- Successor: Monawar Khan
- Born: c. 1826
- Died: November 30, 1882 (aged 55–56)
- Spouses: Sardar Bakhte; Chand Bibi; Gajin Baksh
- Issue: Monawar Khan; Budhu Mia; Dosi Bakhte
Names
- Zorawar Khan (زوراوار خان)
- House: Balasinor
- Dynasty: Babi
- Father: Edul Khan

Zorawar Khan (or Jorawar Khan;1826 – 30 November 1882) was Nawab of Balasinor from 2 December 1831 until his death in 1882.

== Early life and family ==
He was born in 1826 to Edul Khan, the Nawab of Balasinor. He married thrice: firstly, to Sardar Bakhte, a daughter of his paternal uncle Abid Khan; secondly, to Chand Bibi, daughter of a Ghanchi of Balasinor; thirdly, to Gajin Baksh, who was from Baroda. He had issue: two sons, Monawar Khan and Budhu Mia, and a daughter, Dosi Bakhte.

== Reign ==
Upon the death of his father on 2 December 1831, he succeeded to his title, rank, and dignity as the ruler of Balasinor. Since he was a minor at the time of his accession to the throne, his mother, in her capacity as his regent, ruled in his stead. He assumed full administrative powers in 1843. The pergunnah of Virpur, which comprised 42 villages, was long disputed between his state and that of Lunawada. In his reign, the British Government of India awarded Virpur to Balasinor in 1868. He established civil and criminal courts. He founded three schools and appointed an assistant vaccinator to vaccinate children in his dominions.

== Personality ==
Khan was widely admired for his good character, honesty, open-mindedness, generous disposition, and kindness towards others.

== Death ==
He died on 30 November 1882 and was followed on the throne of Balasinor by his son Monawar Khan.

== Honours ==
He received the Prince of Wales's Visit to India Medal (1875–76) in 1875 and the Kaisar-i-Hind Medal in gold in 1877.
