= Muhammad Khan (ruler) =

First Nawab of Balasinor

Muhammad Khan محمد خان

Nawab of Balasinor
- Reign: c. 1758 – ?
- Successor: Jamiat Khan I
- Issue: Jamiat Khan I
Names
- Muhammad Khan (محمد خان)
- House: Balasinor
- Dynasty: Babi
- Father: Sher Khan

Muhammad Khan was the first Nawab of Balasinor from 1758 until his death.

== Biography ==
Muhammad Khan was the eldest son of Sher Khan, the first Nawab of Junagadh. In 1748, when Sher Khan retired to Junagadh, he placed Muhammad in charge of his possession of Balasinor. Upon the death of his father in 1758, he assumed the title of the Nawab of Balasinor. He had persistent conflicts with the expanding Maratha Empire, but his chief minister, Sarasram, had managed to preserve Balasinor and Virpur for him by agreeing to pay half their revenues to the Peshwa. However, he dismissed him and appointed Sultan Habshi as his minister. During his military campaign of 1758–59, Sadashiv Ramchandra, the first Maratha governor of Gujarat, attacked Muhammad Khan, who, at the urging of Sultan Habshi, resisted the Maratha forces for several days. Following an unsuccessful attempt by Sadashiv to capture the town, Muhammad Khan surrendered, agreed to pay an annual tribute of 30,000 rupees, and handed over Sultan Habshi as a hostage to guarantee his compliance. However, Khan paid only 10,000 to 12,000 rupees of the agreed sum and left Sultan Habshi in the harsh custody of Bhagvantrao. In response, Sultan Habshi offered to help his captors capture Balasinor in exchange for his release. The Marathas accepted his proposal and advanced on Balasinor in 1760. Unable to withstand their attack, Khan, without offering them any resistance, fled to Lunawada and left the town to fall into Maratha hands. From there he went to Patan and took refuge with his uncle, Jawan Mard Khan, the Nawab of Radhanpur. In 1761, the people of Balasinor, weary of Maratha oppression, joined forces with the Kolis of the neighbouring areas to drive out the Marathas. Following their success, the Kolis invited Khan to return and reclaim his dominions, thereby restoring him to his throne. He married and had issue: a son, Jamiat Khan I, and a daughter, who married Nawaz Khan, and her sons, Abid Khan and Idal Khan, in due course of time, succeeded to the throne of Balasinor.

Upon his death, his son, Salabat Khan I, succeeded him to his title, rank and dignity.
