= Khanpur, Gujarat =

Khanpur
- city
- Location in Gujarat, India Khanpur (India)
- Coordinates: 23.28°N 73.18°E
- Country: India
- State: Gujarat
- District: Mahisagar

Government
  - Type: Taluka Panchayat

Languages
  - Official: Gujarati, Hindi
- Time zone: UTC+5:30 (IST)
- Postal code: 389230
- Vehicle registration: GJ-35
- Website: gujaratindia.com

Khanpur is a town in the Mahisagar district, Gujarat, India.

== Geography ==
Khanpur is located at 23.28°N 73.18°E. This is located near Lunavada and is 10km from Kadana Dam.

== Koli rebellion ==
In 1857, British Government stationed his army in Lunavada State under Captain Calling to control this area because of Indian Rebellion of 1857. Kolis of Khanpur in Lunavada raised against British Raj under their Koli chief Jivabhai Thakor. The British government sent their army under Captain Buckle and attacked and burnt the Khanpur village.
