= Pravinsinhji =

Raja of Sant (1946-1948)

- Maharana

Raja of Sant
- Reign: 22 December 1946 – 1948
- Predecessor: Jorawarsinhji
- Successor: Krishnakumarsinhji
- Born: 1 December 1907
- Died: 1948
- Spouse: Hansa Kumari
- Issue: Krishnakumarsinhji
Names
- Pravinsinhji Jorawarsinhji
- Father: Jorawarsinhji

Pravinsinhji was the ruler of Sant from 1946 until his death in 1948.

== Early life, family, and education ==
Pravinsinhji was born on 1 December 1907 to Jorawarsinhji. He received his elementary education at home. He then joined the Rajkumar College, Rajkot. After completing the Diploma Examination there, he attended the Princes School in Baroda, which he left in 1925 after passing the School Leaving Certificate Examination of the Bombay University.

He married Hansa Kumari, a daughter of Vijayarajaji, the Maharao of Cutch, by his wife Padma Kunverba, on 15 May 1928 at Bhuj. By her, he had a son, Krishnakumarsinhji.

== Reign ==
Upon the death of his father on 22 December 1946, he succeeded to his title, rank, and dignity as the ruler of Sant. Upon the partition of India, he signed an instrument of accession to accede his state to the Dominion of India. By this instrument, he vested in the Dominion of India powers in relation to the defence, external affairs, and communications of his state. He later entered into a merger agreement with the Governor-General of India on 19 March 1948.

== Death ==
He died of heart failure at his residence in Mumbai in 1948, and was succeeded by his son, Krishnakumarsinhji.
