= Vasad Junction railway station =

Railway station in Gujarat, India

Vasad Junction
- Indian Railway Stations logo

General information
- Location: SH 8, Vasad, Anand district, Gujarat; India
- Coordinates: 22°27′11″N 73°03′37″E
- Elevation: 40 metres (130 ft)
- System: Indian Railways station
- Owner: Indian Railways
- Operator: Western Railway
- Lines: Ahmedabad–Mumbai main line Vasad–Kathana line
- Platforms: 3
- Tracks: 5

Construction
- Structure type: Standard (on ground)
- Parking: No
- Accessible: Available

Other information
- Status: Functioning
- Station code: VDA
- Zone(s): Western Railway
- Division(s): Vadodara
Location
- Location within Gujarat Location within India

Vasad Junction railway station (station code: VDA) is a railway station on the Western Railway network in the state of Gujarat, India. Vasad Junction railway station is 15 km far away from Anand railway station. Passenger, MEMU and few Express trains halt at Vasad Junction railway station.

== Nearby stations ==
Nandesari is nearest railway station towards Vadodara, whereas Adas Road is nearest railway station towards Ahmedabad.

== Trains ==
The following Express trains halt at Vasad Junction railway station in both directions:

- 19033/34 Gujarat Queen
- 19215/16 Saurashtra Express
- 19035/36 Vadodara–Ahmedabad Intercity Express

== See also ==
- Anand district
