= Salabat Khan II =

Nawab of Balasinor (1945–2018)

Nawab of Balasinor
- Reign: 2 February 1945 – 25 January 2018
- Predecessor: Jamiat Khan II
- Successor: Salauddin Khan
- Born: Muhammad Abdul Aziz Khan; 20 May 1944; Baroda
- Died: 25 January 2018 (aged 73)
- Spouse: Farhat Sultana
- Issue: Salauddin Khan; Meher Afshar Sultana; Anjum Sultana; Aaliya Sultana
Regnal name
- Salabat Khan II
- House: Balasinor
- Dynasty: Babi
- Father: Jamiat Khan II
- Mother: Zohra Begum

Salabat Khan II (Muhammad Abdul Aziz Khan; 20 May 1944 – 25 January 2018) was Nawab of Balasinor from 2 February 1945 until his death in 2018.

== Early life and family ==
Khan was born as Muhammad Abdul Aziz Khan on 20 May 1944 in Baroda to Jamiat Khan II, the Nawab of Balasinor, and his fourth wife, Zohra Begum. He married Farhat Sultana, a daughter of Zarbadast Khan of Palanpur by his wife, Noor Bakhte Begum of Junagadh. The two had issue together, one son, Salauddin Khan, and three daughters: Meher Afshar Sultana, Anjum Sultana, and Aaliya Sultana.

== Reign ==
Upon the death of his father on 2 February 1945, he, as Salabat Khan II, acceded to his title, rank and dignity as the ruler of Balasinor. As he was only 8 months and 13 days old at the time, a council of regency was formed to administer the state in his stead until he came of age. Upon the lapse of British paramountcy in India in 1947, the then-ruling Maharana of Lunawada was called to Balasinor to sign the instrument of accession to the Dominion of India on Khan's behalf. The Maharana duly came and signed the instrument of accession on his behalf. On 6 September 1970, he ceased being recognised as the ruler of Balasinor, after an order to this effect was issued by the President of India. By this order, the President was exercising the powers vested in him through Article 366(22) of the Constitution of India.

== Death ==
Khan died on 25 January 2018 and was succeeded by his only son, Salauddin Khan, to his title, rank and dignity.

== Titles and styles ==
Styles of Salabat Khan II
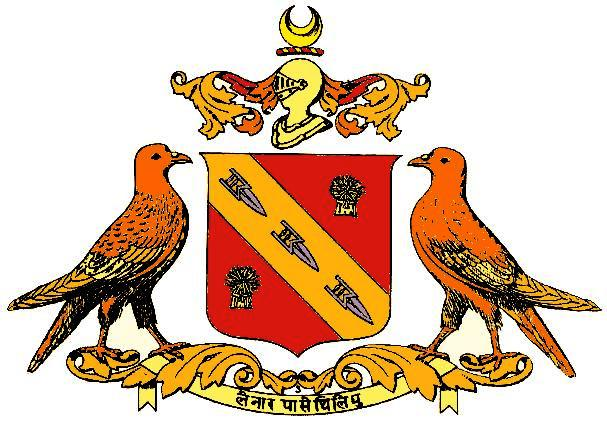
- Reference style: His Highness
- Spoken style: Your Highness

Khan held numerous titles starting from his birth, as the son of a Nawab of Balasinor, and following his accession to his father's throne. Each is listed below; where two dates are shown, the first indicates the date of receiving the title, and the second indicates the date of its loss or renunciation:

- 20 May 1944 – 2 February 1945: Nawabzada Shri Muhammad Abdul Aziz Khan Jamiat Khan Babi of Balasinor
- 2 February 1945 – 25 January 2018: His Highness Nawab Shri Salabat Khan II Sahib Bahadur, Nawab of Balasinor
