= Bajva railway station =

Railway station in Gujarat, India

General information
- Location: Bajva, Vadodara district, Gujarat; India
- Coordinates: 22°21′59″N 73°08′37″E
- Elevation: 38 metres (125 ft)
- System: Indian Railways station
- Owner: Indian Railways
- Operator: Western Railway
- Line: Ahmedabad–Mumbai main line
- Platforms: 3
- Tracks: 3

Construction
- Structure type: Standard (on ground station)
- Parking: No
- Cycle facilities: No

Other information
- Status: Functioning
- Station code: BJW
- Zone(s): Western Railway
- Division(s): Vadodara
Location
- Location within India Location within Gujarat

Bajva railway station is a railway station in Bajva town of Vadodara district of Gujarat, India. Its code is BJW. It is the rail head for the Gujarat Refinery for petrol and diesel. Bajva is also the loading point of fertilizers from Gujarat State Fertilizers and Chemicals. Passenger, MEMU and Intercity trains halt here.

== Major trains ==
Following major trains halt at Bajva railway station in both direction:

- 19035/36 Vadodara–Ahmedabad Intercity Express
