= Bochasan Junction railway station =

Railway station in Gujarat, India

General information
- Location: Bochasan, Anand district India
- Coordinates: 22°24′07″N 72°50′55″E
- Elevation: 29 metres (95 ft)
- System: Indian Railways station
- Owner: Ministry of Railways, Indian Railways
- Operator: Western Railway
- Line: Vasad–Kathana line
- Platforms: 3
- Tracks: 3

Construction
- Structure type: Standard (on ground)
- Parking: No

Other information
- Status: Functioning
- Station code: BCHN
- Zone(s): Western Railway
- Division(s): Vadodara
Location
- Location within India Location within Gujarat

Bochasan Junction railway station is a railway station on the Western Railway network in the state of Gujarat, India. Passenger trains halt at Bochasan Junction railway station.

== Major trains ==
Following trains halt at Bochasan Junction railway station in both direction:

- 59101/02 Kathana–Vadodara Passenger
- 59103/04 Kathana–Vadodara Passenger

== See also ==
- Anand district
