= Jorawarsinhji =

Raja of Sant (1896-1946)

- Maharana

Raja of Sant
- Reign: 31 August 1896 – 22 December 1946
- Coronation: 31 August 1896
- Investiture: 10 May 1902
- Predecessor: Pratapsinhji
- Successor: Pravinsinhji
- Born: 24 March 1881
- Died: 22 December 1946 (aged 65)
- Issue Detail: Pravinsinhji
Names
- Jorawarsinhji Pratapsinhji
- Education: Rajkumar College, Rajkot

Jorawarsinhji was the Raja of Santrampur from 1896 until his death in 1946.

== Early life, family, and education ==
He was born on 24 March 1881 into the Babrol family and was educated at Rajkumar College, Rajkot. He married a daughter of Nahar Singh of Shahpura and, by her, had issue, a son, Pravinsinhji.

== Succession ==
In 1896, when Pratapsinhji, the Raja of Santrampur, died without leaving any issue to succeed him, Jorawarsinhji was chosen to succeed the deceased on the vacant throne. He was installed on the throne on 31 August 1896. Owing to his minority at the time, a council of regency was formed to govern the state in his stead until he came of age. After completing his studies, he remained associated with the Government of India-appointed administrator of his state for more than a year to gain experience in administration. He was formally invested with full administrative powers on 10 May 1902 by the political agent at a grand Durbar, which was specially held for the purpose, at the capital of his state.

He personally oversaw the administration of his state and, during his reign, state revenue increased, lands were surveyed, and regular settlements were introduced. He made primary and secondary education entirely free and made provision for English education. He sanctioned municipal elections and expanded medical relief through new dispensaries. He founded a permanent Famine Relief Fund, provided agricultural and merchant loans, and developed infrastructure, including electricity in towns, metalled roads, a clock tower, and public gardens.

== Personal interests ==
Jorawarsinhji was a skilled horseman and was particularly noted for his love of shooting. He is said to have shot at least 52 panthers, along with a number of other large game species.

== Death ==
He died on 22 December 1946 and was succeeded by his son Pravinsinhji to his rank, title, and designation.
