= Mahi Bajaj Sagar Dam =

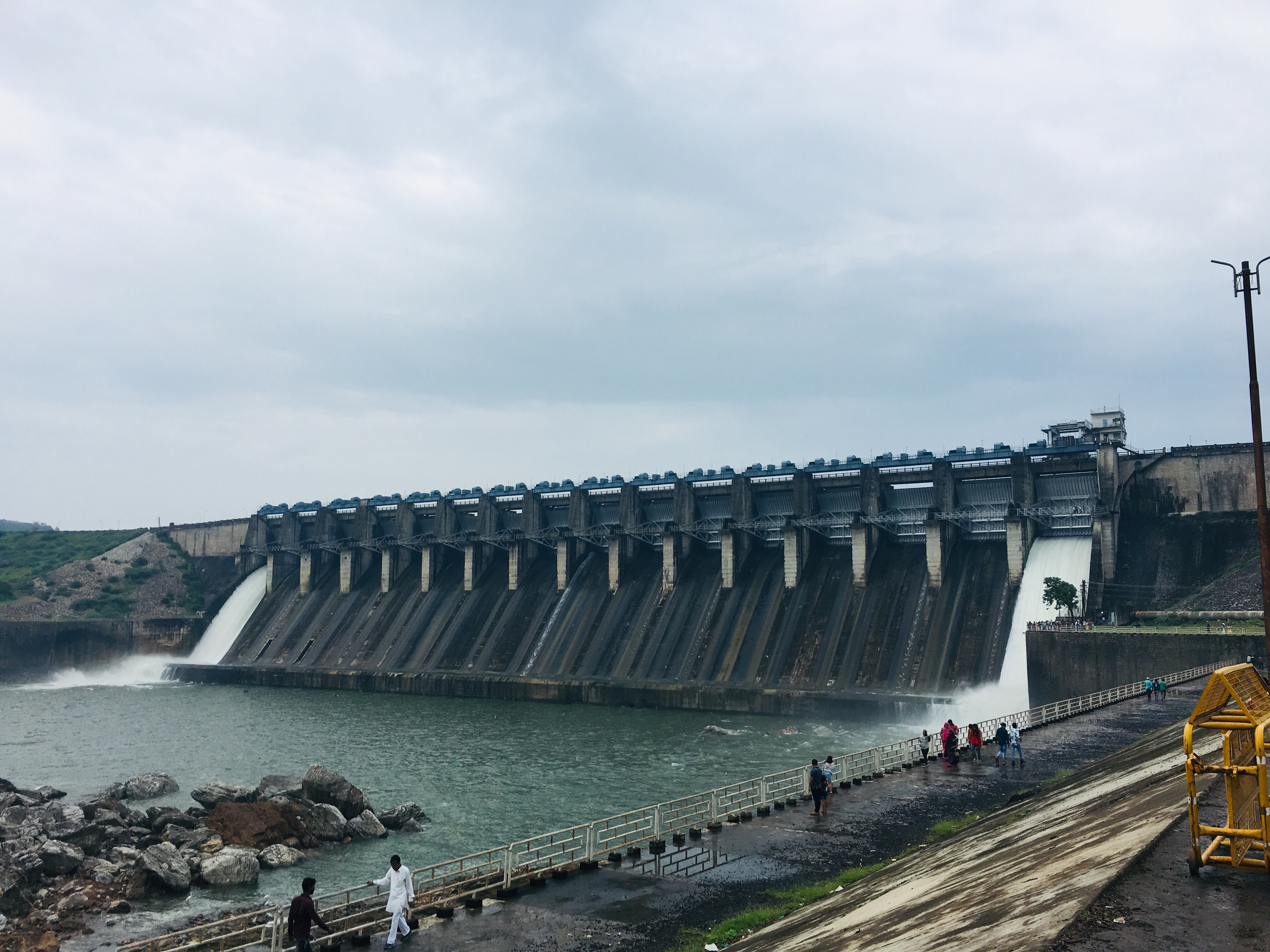

- Location within Rajasthan
- Interactive map of Mahi Bajaj Sagar Dam
- Country: India
- Location: Banswara
- Coordinates: 23°37′37.31″N 74°32′39.03″E
- Purpose: Power, irrigation, water storage
- Status: Operational
- Construction began: 1972
- Opening date: 1983; 43 years ago

Dam and spillways
- Type of dam: Masonry with embankment main sections
- Impounds: Mahi River
- Height: 43 m (141 ft)
- Length: 3,019 m (9,905 ft)

Reservoir
- Active capacity: 2,070,000,000 m^{3} (1,680,000 acre⋅ft)
- Catchment area: 6,149 km^{2} (2,374 mi^{2})

Power Station
- Commission date: 1986, 1989
- Turbines: 2 x 25 MW, 2 x 45 MW Francis-type
- Installed capacity: 140 MW

Mahi Bajaj Sagar Dam is a dam across the Mahi River. It is situated 16 kilometres from Banswara town in Banswara district Rajasthan, India. The dam was constructed between 1972 and 1983 for the purposes of hydroelectric power generation and water supply. It is the longest dam and second largest dam in Rajasthan. It is named after Jamnalal Bajaj. It is the biggest multipurpose project for tribal area of Rajasthan.

== Power Plant ==
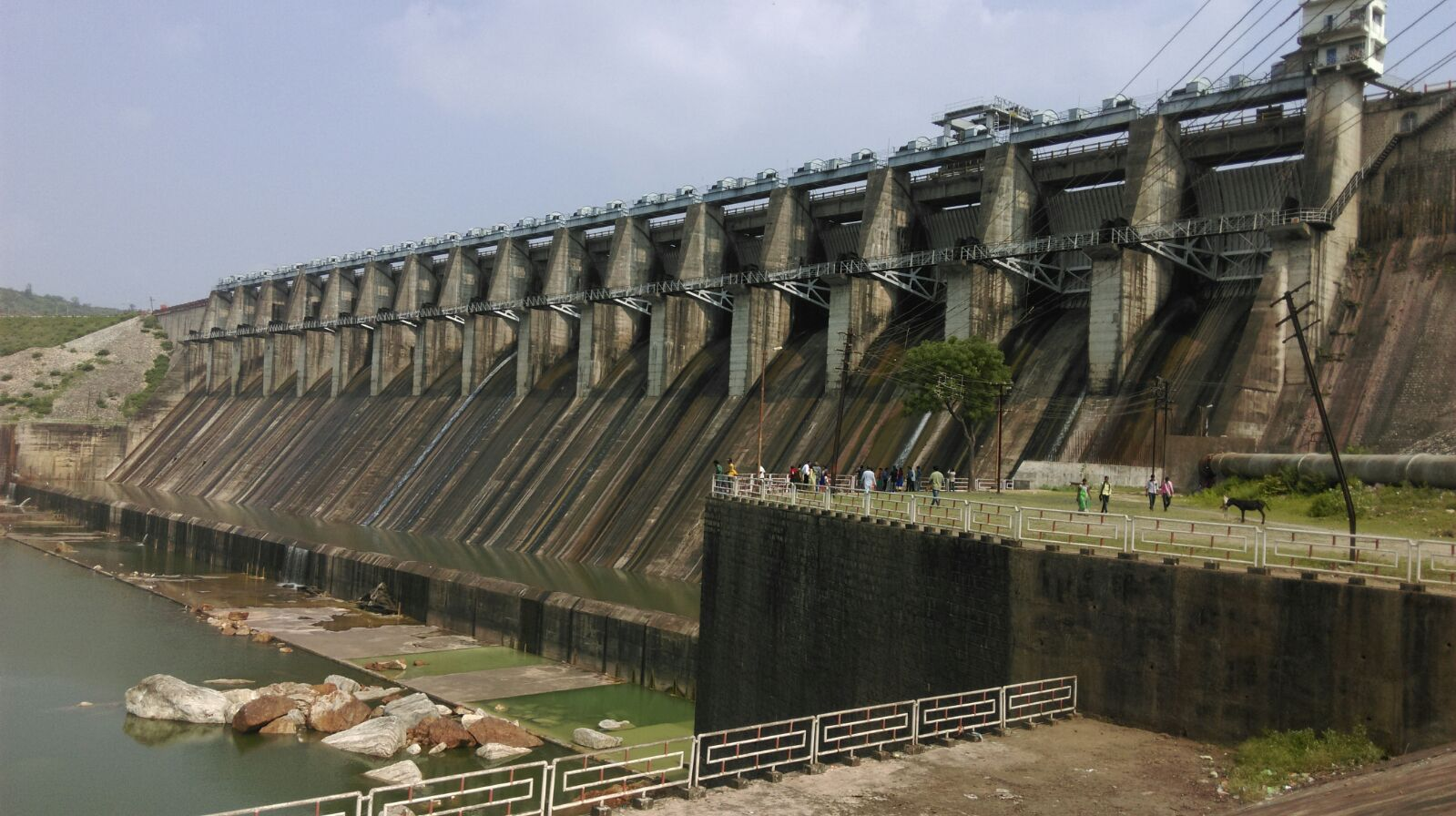
Mahi Bajaj Sagar Dam

The dam has an installed capacity of 140 MW.

Stage	Unit Number	Installed Capacity (MW)	Date of Commissioning	Status
1	1	25	1986 January	Operational
1	2	25	1986 February	Operational
2	1	45	1989 February	Operational
2	2	45	1989 September	Operational

== See also ==
- Kadana Dam – located downstream
