= Nandesari railway station =

Railway station in Gujarat, India

General information
- Location: Nandesari, Vadodara district, Gujarat; India
- Coordinates: 22°25′04″N 73°05′42″E
- Elevation: 41 metres (135 ft)
- System: Indian Railways station
- Owner: Indian Railways
- Operator: Western Railway
- Line: Ahmedabad–Mumbai main line
- Platforms: 2
- Tracks: 2

Construction
- Structure type: Standard (on ground station)
- Parking: No
- Cycle facilities: No

Other information
- Status: Functioning
- Station code: NDR
- Zone(s): Western Railway
- Division(s): Vadodara
Location
- Location within India Location within Gujarat

Nandesari railway station is a railway station in Nandesari town of Vadodara district on the Western Railway zone of the Indian Railways. Passenger, MEMU trains halt here.

Station code of Nandesari is NDR. It has 2 platforms. Nandesari is well connected by rail to Ahmedabad Junction, Kathana, Anand Junction, Nadiad Junction, Vadodara Junction, Viramgam Junction, Bharuch Junction and Mumbai Central.
