= Prabodhkant Pandya =

Indian politician from Gujarat (died 2021)

Prabodhkant Damodardas Pandya (1943/1944 – 22 August 2021) was an Indian politician from Gujarat.

== Political career ==
Pandya was a member of Gujarat Legislative Assembly representing Santrampur constituency from 1985 to 1990 under Janata Party, 1990 to 1995 under Janata Dal and 2002 to 2007 under Bharatiya Janata Party (BJP). He had served as Minister of State for Home and Education departments under Chimanbhai Patel government. In 2012, he left BJP and joined Gujarat Parivartan Party (GPP). He contested 2012 Gujarat Legislative Assembly election from Lunawada constituency and lost.

He had worked for development of Nandinath Mahadev temple in Kadana Taluka of Gujarat.

== Death ==
He died on 22 August 2021 at Ahmedabad at age of 77. He was cremated at his native, Jaguna Muvada village in Kadana Taluka.
