= Balasinor Assembly constituency =

Legislative Assembly constituency in Gujarat State, India

Coordinates: 22.96°N 73.33°E

Balasinor
- Constituency No. 121 for the Gujarat Legislative Assembly

Constituency details
- Country: India
- Region: Western India
- State: Gujarat
- District: Mahisagar
- Lok Sabha constituency: Panchmahal
- Established: 1962
- Total electors: 288,570
- Reservation: None

Member of Legislative Assembly
- 15th Gujarat Legislative Assembly
- Incumbent Mansinh .k. Chauhan
- Party: Bharatiya Janata Party
- Elected year: 2022

Balasinor is one of the 182 Legislative Assembly constituencies of Gujarat state in India. It is part of Mahisagar and Kheda district. He was cabinet transport minister in Shankersinh Vaghela’s government and cabinet education minister in Keshubhai Patel’s government. He is MLA since 1990, he got elected in 2022 as member of legislative assembly and this is his 6th term, he has massive influence all over the Mahisagar district and he is a renowned political leader of Gujarat

== List of segments ==
This assembly seat represents the following segments,

1. Balasinor Taluka
2. Virpur Taluka
3. Kapadvanj Taluka (Part) of Kheda district Villages – Vaghana Muvada, Gocharna Muvada, Kamboya, Ghadiya, Malana Muvada, Valva Mahuda, Kavath, Kashipura, Suki, Pathoda, Vaghas, Dantali, Thavad, Sultanpur (Vadadhara), Vadadhara, Vanta, Ghauva, Sunda, Reliya, Dudhathal, Letar, Bhutiya, Danadra, Antisar, Garod, Ramosadi, Khadol, Mal Itadi Pagi Bhag, Mal Itadi Baraiya Bhag, Vejalpur, Rampura (Sorna), Savali, Chikhlod, Vadol
4. Kathlal Taluka (Part) of Kheda district Villages – Sikandar Porda, Vishvnathpura, Charan Nikol, Fagvel, Porda Fagvel, Fulchhatrapura, Lasundra, Ladvel, Laxmanpura

== Members of Legislative Assembly ==
Year	Member	Picture	Party
1962	Shantaben Makavana		Indian National Congress
1967	N K Solanki		Swatantra Party
1972	Chhatrasinh Solanki		Indian National Congress
1975	Champaben Modi		Independent politician
1980	Chhatrasingh Solanki		Indian National Congress
1985	Babi Nurjahan Bkhat Mohamadibrahim Khan		Indian National Congress
1990	Mansinh Chauhan		Bharatiya Janata Party
1995	Mansinh Chauhan		Rashtriya Janata Party
1998	Mansinh Chauhan		Indian National Congress
2002	Rajesh Pathak		Bharatiya Janata Party
2007	Mansinh Chauhan		Indian National Congress
2012	Mansinh Chauhan		Indian National Congress
2017	Ajitsinh Chauhan		Indian National Congress
2022	Mansinh Kohyabhai Chauhan		Bharatiya Janata Party

== Election results ==
=== 2022 ===
Gujarat Assembly Election, 2022
Party	Candidate	Votes	%	±%
BJP	Mansinh Chauhan	92,501	50.76	
INC	Ajitsinh Chauhan	41,079	22.54	
AAP	Udesinh Chauhan	39,569	21.71	New
Majority			28.22	
Turnout		182243		
BJP gain from INC		Swing		

=== 2017 ===
Gujarat Legislative Assembly Election, 2017: Balasinor
Party	Candidate	Votes	%	±%
INC	Ajitsinh Parvatsinh Chauhan			
NOTA	None of the Above			
Majority				
Turnout				

=== 2012 ===
2012 Gujarat Legislative Assembly election: Balasinor
Party	Candidate	Votes	%	±%
INC	Mansinh Chauhan	87,088	50.15	
BJP	RajeshBhai pathak	69,917	40.26	
Majority		17,171	9.89	
Turnout		173,668	74.39	
INC hold		Swing		

== See also ==
- List of constituencies of Gujarat Legislative Assembly
- Gujarat Legislative Assembly
