= Jivabhai Motibhai Damor =

Indian politician

- જીવાભાઈ મોતીભાઈ ડામોર

Member of Gujarat Legislative Assembly for Santrampur Assembly constituency
- In office 1967–1980
- Preceded by: Vallavdas Maganlal Parikh
- Succeeded by: Pandya Probhkant Damodardas
- Constituency: Santrampur

Personal details
- Party: INC
- Occupation: Politician

Jivabhai Motibhai Damor is an Indian politician who represented Santrampur Assembly constituency in the Gujarat Legislative Assembly. He was elected as MLA in 1967 to 1980 from Santrampur Assembly constituency as a member of the Indian National Congress.
