= Santrampur =

Santrampur Sunth
- Location within Gujarat Location within India
- Coordinates: 23.1895°N 73.8928°E
- Country: India
- State: Gujarat
- District: Mahisagar
- Ward: 6
- Santrampur Nagarpalika: Established 15 April 1994

Government
  - Body: Nagarpalika
  - President: Sunitaben Kartikkumar Khant
  - Chief Officer: D.M.Hathila

Area
  - Total: 16.00 km^{2} (6.18 sq mi)
- Elevation: 140 m (460 ft)

Population (2011)
  - Total: 21,772
  - Density: 1,361/km^{2} (3,524/sq mi)

Languages
  - Official: Gujarati, Hindi,
- Time zone: UTC+5:30 (IST)
- PIN: 389 260
- Telephone code: (91) 2675
- Vehicle registration: GJ-17/GJ-35
- Literacy Rate: 84.99%
- Legislature type: Nagar Palika (Municipality)
- Legislature Strength: 24
- Lok Sabha Constituency: Dahod
- Vidhan Sabha Constituency: Santrampur
- Climate: Tropical savanna (Köppen: Aw)

Santrampur, is a town in Mahisagar District, Gujarat, India. It serves as the administrative headquarters for Santrampur tehsil and historically it was the capital of the Kingdom of Santrampur ruled by Mahipavat branch of the Parmar Rajputs. It is located on the banks of the Suki river in the lap of the Aravalli hills. It is 155 km (96 mi) from the state capital at Gandhinagar.

As of 2011, Santrampur had a population of almost 19,000 people. The town is known for its historical tower built in the western part of the city. An open-air market, called Haat bazaar, take place on every Tuesday in the town. The town houses various heritage buildings, administrator offices and educational institutions.

== History ==
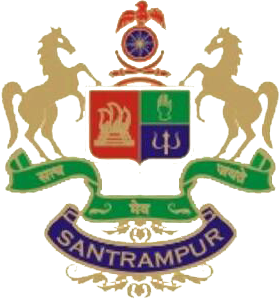
Coat of Arms of the Sant State

It was historically capital of the Kingdom of Santrampur ruled by Mahipavat branch of the Parmar Rajputs. It became a princely state in subsidiary alliance with British India. It was also known as Sant State.

The state covered an area of approximately 1,367 km² and was bounded on the north by the dominions of Dungarpur and Banswara in Rajputana. On the east was the sub division of Jhalod in the Panch Mahals. On the south it touched the small state of Sanjeli while on the west it was bounded by the State of Lunavada.

The State enjoyed a hereditary salute of 9 gun and 11 gun local salute. The ruler of Sant State signed the accession to the Indian Union after Indian independence.

== Geography ==
Santrampur is located at 23.1895°N 73.8928°E in western India at an elevation of 140 metres. It is the town with an area of 16 square kilometers and a population of 19,445, according to the 2010–11 census. The town sits on the banks of the Suki River, in central Gujarat. The Suki river frequently dries up in the summer, leaving only a small stream of water.

The three borders of Santrampur known as Pratappura, Sant and Navi Vasahat.

== Civic Administration ==
Santrampur is administered by the Nagarpalika. The Nagarpalika was established in April 1994 under the Gujarat Municipalities Act - 1963. For administrative purposes, the city is divided into six wards. The principal responsibility of Nagarpalika to ensure an overall development of the Santrampur agglomeration covering an area of 16 km2. Four corporators are elected from each ward, who in turn elect a president. Executive powers are vested in the chief officer, who is an officer appointed by the Gujarat state government. Nagarpalika is responsible for Water supply, Hospitals, Roads, Street lighting, Drainage, Fire brigade, Market places, Records of births and deaths, Solid waste management, Maintaining gardens, parks and playgrounds, Providing education to unprivileged children etc. The Santrampur Police Station is headed by a Police Inspector (PI), appointed by Government of Gujarat.

The City elects One member to the Lok Sabha (parliament), which comes under Dahod (Lok Sabha constituency) and One to the Gujarat Vidhan Sabha (Assembly), which comes under Santrampur (Vidhan Sabha constituency). One assembly seat of Santrampur was won by the BJP during the legislative elections in 2017. In the 2018 Nagarpalika elections, the BJP won 14 seats, 5 seats went to the Congress and 5 to others.

== Demographics ==
As of 2011 India census, Santrampur had a population of 19,465. Population of Children with age of 0-6 is 2511 which is 12.90% of total population of Santrampur. In Santrampur, Female Sex Ratio is of 934 against state average of 919. Literacy rate of Santrampur city is 84.99% higher than state average of 78.03%. In Santrampur, Male literacy is around 91.58% while female literacy rate is 78.03%.

Religion

Hinduism is the majority religion of Santrampur and Islam is the second religion of Santrampur which minority of Islams live in the northern part.
