= Monawar Khan =

Nawab of Balasinor (1882–1899)

Monawar Khan منور خان

Nawab of Balasinor
- Reign: 2 December 1831 – 30 November 1882
- Predecessor: Zorawar Khan
- Successor: Jamiat Khan II
- Born: 17 September 1846
- Died: 24 April 1899 (aged 52)
- Issue: Jamiat Khan II
Names
- Monawar Khan (منور خان)
- House: Balasinor
- Dynasty: Babi
- Father: Zorawar Khan

Monawar Khan (17 September 1846 – 24 March 1899) was Nawab of Balasinor from 30 November 1882 until his death in 1899.

== Early life and family ==
Khan was born on 17 September 1846 to Zorawar Khan, the Nawab of Balasinor. He married thrice: firstly, to a daughter of a Nawab of Radhanpur; secondly, to a daughter of the Sardar of Kerwada and Khadal; and thirdly, to Raje Bibi. He had issue, a son, Jamiat Khan II.

== Reign ==
Upon the death of his father on 30 November 1882, he succeeded to his title, rank, and dignity as the Nawab of Balasinor. He was installed on the throne by Woodward Willoughby, the then Political Agent of Rewa Kantha. During his reign, he introduced several measures calculated to improve the lives and livelihoods of his subjects. In 1890, the British Government of India conferred on him a sanad, whereby it guaranteed him that, in the event of the failure of natural heirs, the succession to his family would continue in accordance with Islamic laws. In 1891, he had to conclude another agreement with the British Government of India, by which he had to close his distilleries and liquor shops that were in two villages in Kaira district for a period of ten years in lieu of an annual compensation of Rs. 660.

== Death ==
He died on 24 March 1899 and was followed on the throne of Balasinor by his son Jamiat Khan II.
