= Gujarat Express =

Train in India

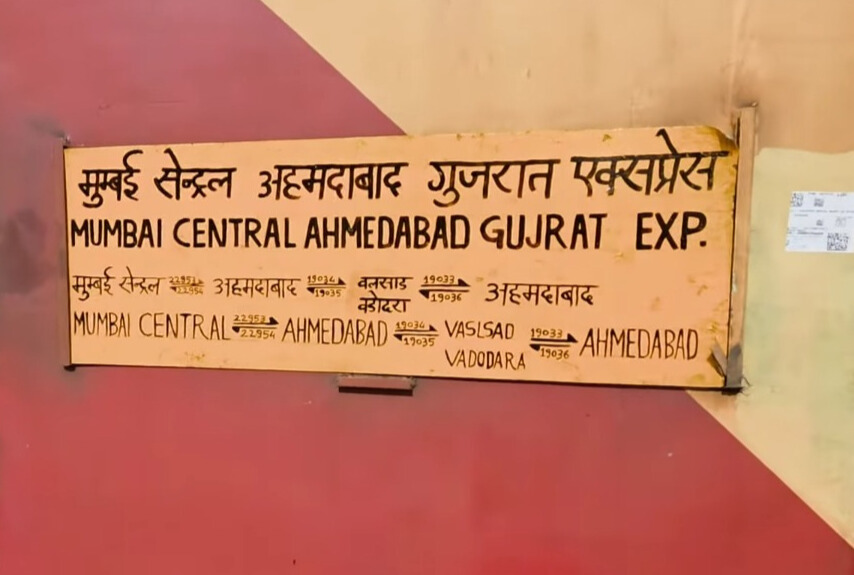

Overview
- Service type: Superfast Express
- Locale: Maharashtra & Gujarat
- Current operator: Western Railway

Route
- Termini: Mumbai Central (MMCT); Ahmedabad Junction (ADI)
- Stops: 27
- Distance travelled: 491 km (305 mi)
- Average journey time: 9 hours 10 minutes
- Service frequency: Daily
- Train number: 22953 / 22954

On-board services
- Classes: AC Chair Car, AC First Class, Second Class Seating, General Unreserved
- Seating arrangements: Yes
- Sleeping arrangements: Yes (First Class only)
- Catering facilities: No Pantry car but Available
- Observation facilities: Rake Sharing with 19109/19110 Gujarat Queen & 19129/19130 Vadodara Ahmedabad Intercity Express
- Baggage facilities: Available
- Other facilities: Below the seats

Technical
- Rolling stock: ICF coach
- Track gauge: 1,676 mm (5 ft 6 in)
- Operating speed: 52 km/h (32 mph) average including halts.
Route map
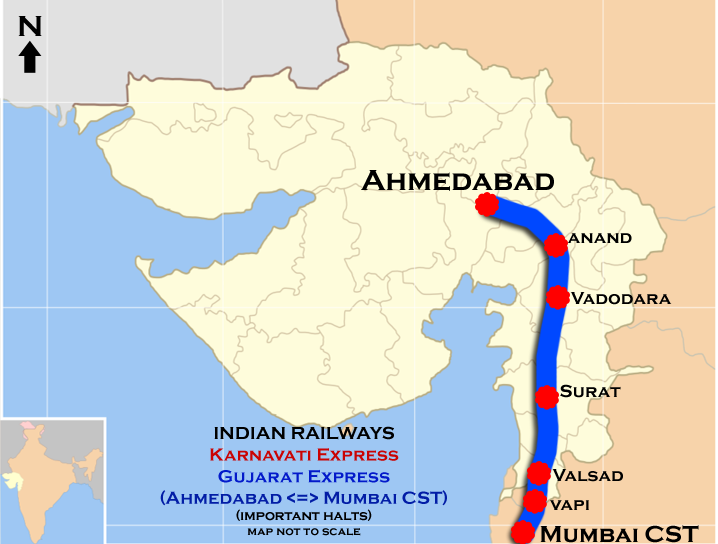

The 22953 / 22954 Gujarat Express is a Superfast Express train belonging to Indian Railways that run between Mumbai Central and Ahmedabad Junction in India.

It operates as train number 22953 from Mumbai Central to Ahmedabad Junction and as train number 22954 in the reverse direction.

== Coaches ==
22953/22954 Gujarat Superfast Express presently has 3 AC Chair Car, 2 1st Class, 10 2nd Class seating & 8 General Unreserved coaches.

As with most train services in India, coach composition may be amended at the discretion of Indian Railways depending on demand.

== Service ==
22953 Gujarat Superfast Express covers the distance of 491 kilometres in 9 hours (55 km/h) & 9 hours 25 mins as 22954 Gujarat Superfast Express (55 km/h).

As the average speed of the train is above 55 km/h, as per Indian Railways rules, its fare includes a Superfast surcharge.

== Traction ==
the train still continues using WAP-5 end to end on every journey

== Gallery ==
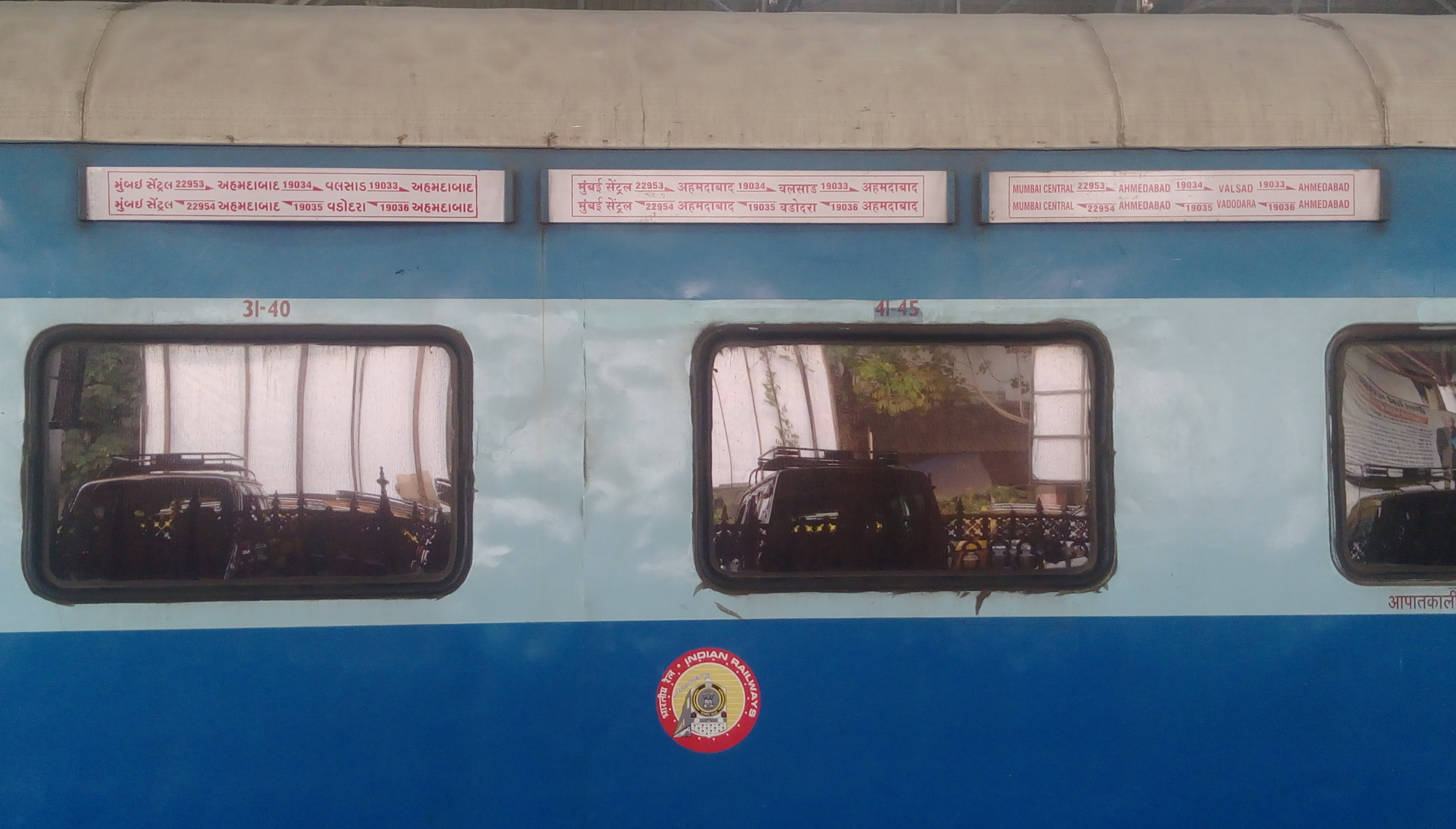
Gujarat Superfast Express – AC Chair Car coach

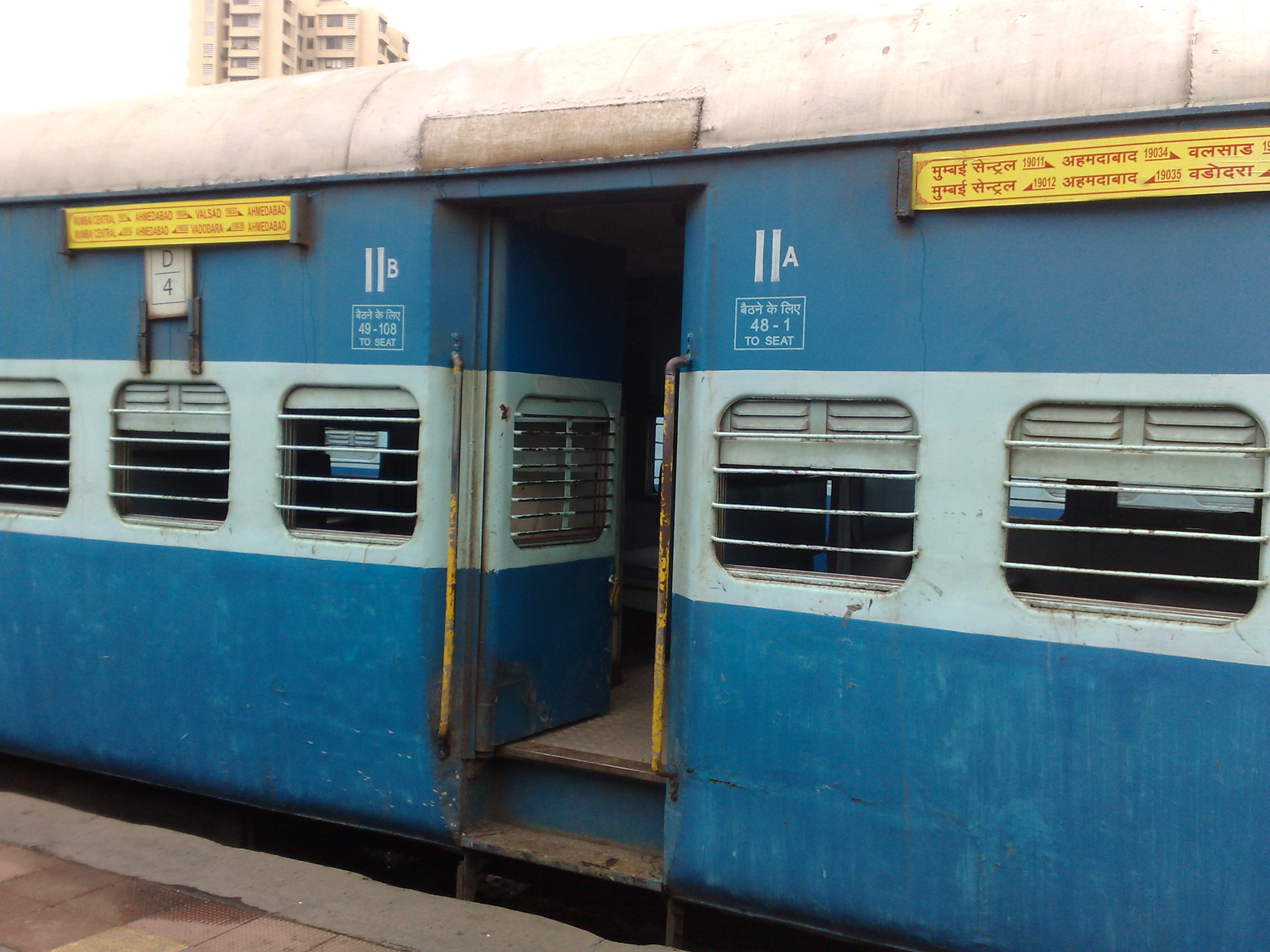
Gujarat Superfast Express – 2nd Class seating coach

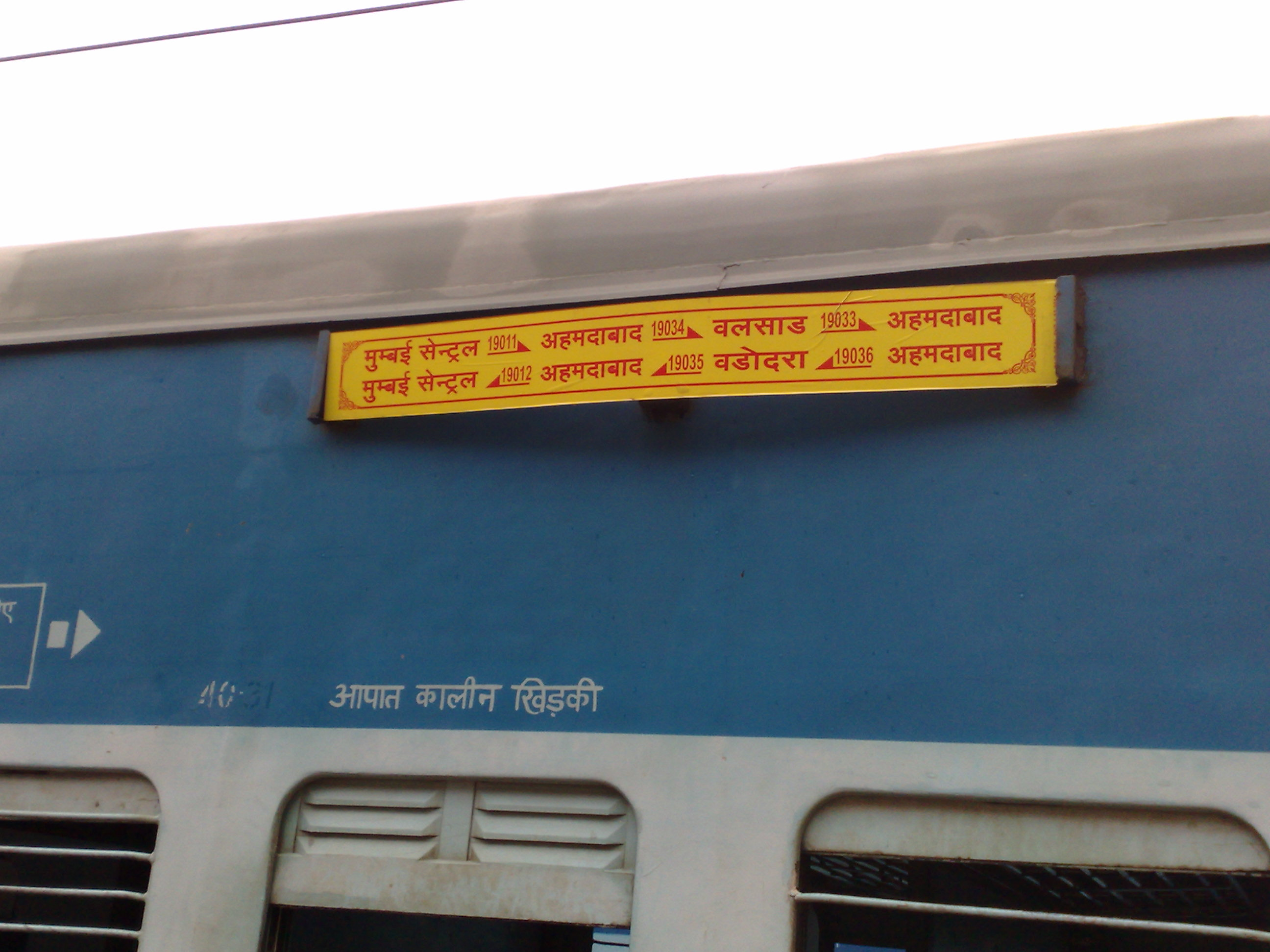
Gujarat Superfast Express – Coach board
