= Jamiat Khan II =

Nawab of Balasinor (1899–1945)

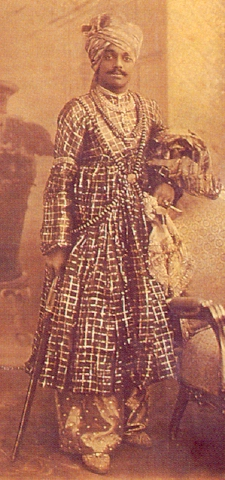
- Khan

Nawab of Balasinor
- Reign: 24 March 1899 – 2 February 1945
- Predecessor: Monawar Khan
- Successor: Salabat Khan II
- Born: 10 November 1894
- Died: 2 February 1945 (aged 50)
- Spouses: Subhan Bakhte (m. 1915; death 1920); Sardar Begum (m. 1918); Khurshid Begum (m. 1929); Zohra Begum (m. 1930)
- Issue: Salabat Khan II
Names
- Jamiat Khan (جمعیت خان)
- House: Balasinor
- Dynasty: Babi
- Father: Monawar Khan
- Education: Imperial Cadet Corps; Rajkumar College, Rajkot

Jamiat Khan II (10 November 1894 – 2 February 1945) was Nawab of Balasinor from 24 March 1899 until his death in 1945.

== Early life, education, and family ==
Khan was born on 10 November 1894 to Monawar Khan, the Nawab of Balasinor. He received his elementary education at home. While he was at home, a munshi was hired to teach him Urdu and Gujarati. He was later sent to Rajkumar College, Rajkot. He graduated from the Rajkumar College with a diploma. Following that, he joined the Imperial Cadet Corps at Dehradun for military training. He was then sent to Godhra to receive a course of training in the administration of various departments of the state. He married firstly on 31 October 1915, to Subhan Bakhte, a daughter of Juma Khan, the heir apparent of Junagadh; secondly, in 1918, to Sardar Begum, a daughter of Raisinhji, the Thakore of Kerwada and Khadal; thirdly, in 1929, to Khurshid Begum; and fourthly, on 25 December 1930, to Zohra Begum, who was a daughter of a former servant of Sardar Begum. Subhan Bakhte died on 31 January 1920. By Sardar Begum, he had a son who died in infancy. By Zohra Begum, he had four daughters and a son, Salabat Khan II.

== Reign ==
Upon the death of his father on 24 March 1899, he acceded to his title, rank and dignity as the ruler of Balasinor. Owing to his minority, the administration of the state was placed under the charge of the British Government of India. He was invested with full administrative powers on 31 December 1915. To mark the occasion, he announced the provision of free education in primary schools, waived up to Rs. 5,000 in land revenue arrears owed by poor farmers, and released some prisoners. During the First World War, he also offered his personal services and his state's resources to the Crown, and donated a motor ambulance for use at the front. Due to his poor management of state finances, the Government stripped him of his ruling powers on 30 August 1933. In 1938, his continued misuse of public funds to support his lavish lifestyle led the Government to appoint an administrator to administer the state's affairs and to issue an order requiring him to reside outside the state. Accordingly, he settled in Baroda.

== Interests ==
He wrote poetry in Urdu and Gujarati as well as plays that were widely admired in Gujarat.

== Death ==
He died on 2 February 1945 while he was in Baroda, and was succeeded by his only son, Salabat Khan II.
