= Santrampur Assembly constituency =

Legislative Assembly constituency in Gujarat State, India

Coordinates: 23.19°N 73.9°E

Santrampur
- Constituency No. 123 for the Gujarat Legislative Assembly
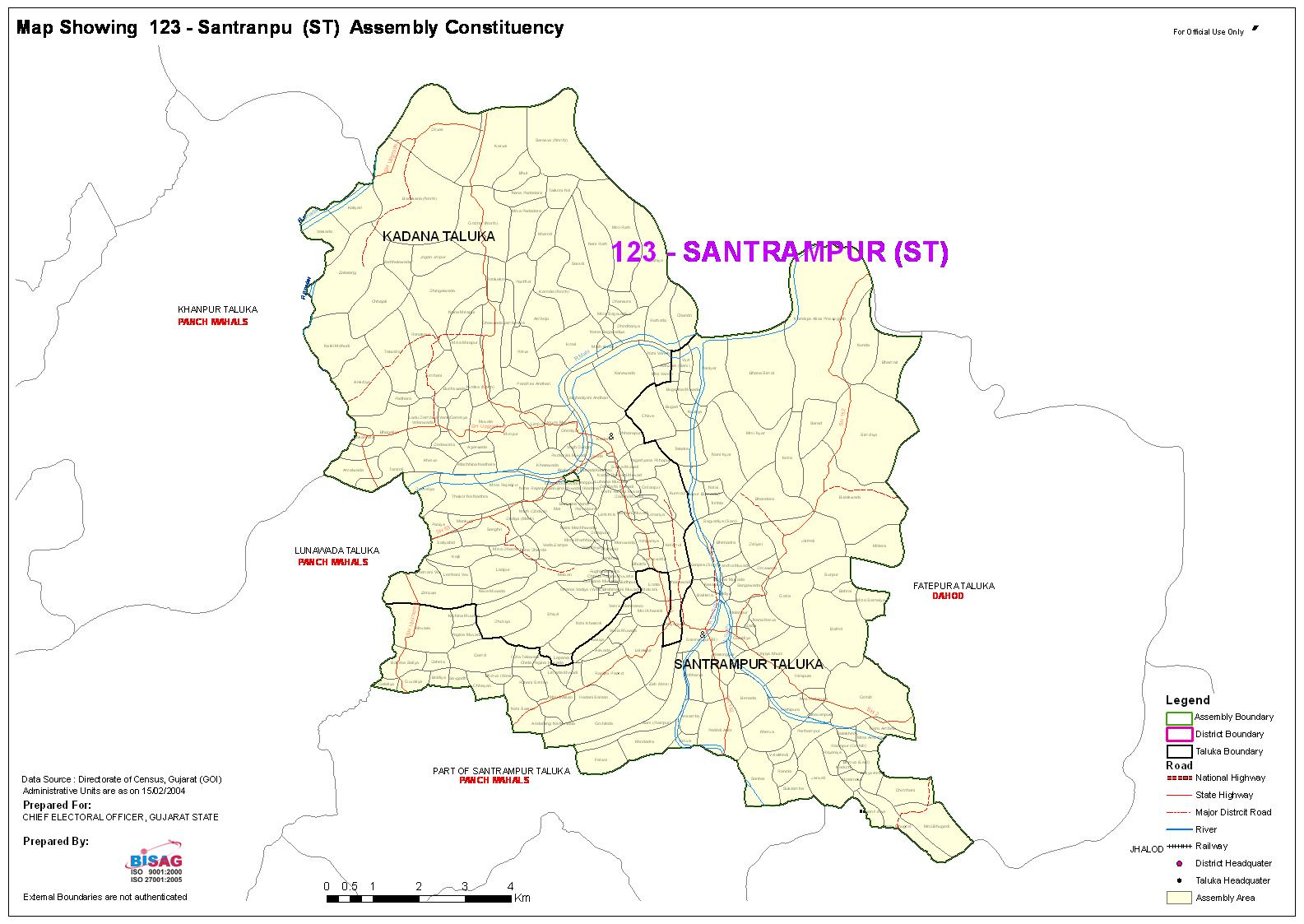

Constituency details
- Country: India
- Region: Western India
- State: Gujarat
- District: Mahisagar
- Lok Sabha constituency: Dahod
- Established: 1962
- Total electors: 238,708
- Reservation: ST

Member of Legislative Assembly
- 15th Gujarat Legislative Assembly
- Incumbent Dr. Kuberbhai Mansukhbhai Dindor
- Party: Bharatiya Janata Party
- Elected year: 2022

Santrampur is one of the 182 Legislative Assembly constituencies of Gujarat state in India. It is part of Mahisagar district and is reserved for candidates belonging to the Scheduled Tribes.

== List of segments ==
This assembly seat represents the following segments,

1. Santrampur Taluka (Part) Villages – Chitva, Bugad, Bugadna Muvada, Kanzara (Sant), Vyar, Paniyar, Bhana Simal, Khedaya (Pratapgadh), Kunda, Bhamari, Simaliya, Sarad, Kotra, Moti Kyar, Nani Kyar, Kyariya, Taladra, Pithapur (Borvada), Nalai, Timbla, Bhandara, Batakwada, Molara, Ukhreli, Daliyati, Bhenadra, Sagvadiya (Sant), Kanjara (Sant), Barikota, Pancha Muvadi, Metana Muvada, Dotawada, Surpur, Mota Sarnaiya, Babrol, Gada, Sangawada, Vadiya, Kasalpur, Endra, Moti Kharsoli, Vanta (Mahetana), Vavia Muvada, Kasiya, Asivada, Chela Pagina Muvada, Gala Talawadi, Gamdi, Pagina Muvada, Kothina Muvada, Movasa, Bavana Saliya, Dahela, Bhotva (West), Limada Muvadi, Ranijini Padedi, Lalakpur, Garadiya, Malanpur, Nana Natva, Sada, Babrai, Hirapura, Vanjiya Khunt, Narsingpur, Timbharva, Sant (Rampur), Zab (West), Hadani Sarsan, Moti Sarsan, Ranani Sarsan, Chhayan, Savgadh, Boidiya, Guvaliya, Galaliya, Nani Sarsan, Andarsing Na Muvada, Gothibda, Kosamba, Benada, Hathipura, Nes Hathipura, Gothib, Nana Ambela, Mota Ambela, Galakhedi, Bhavanpura, Parthampur, Kherva, Padedi Ador, Kotvat, Khodadra, Falwa, Valakhedi, Rayaniya, Ratanpur (Gothib), Kaliya Amba, Bhotva (East), Kaduchi, Janvad, Ranela, Sanbar, Sukatimba, Moralnaka, Chinchani, Moti Bhugedi, Nani Bhugedi, Sagan Faliya, Santrampur (M)
2. Kadana Taluka

== Members of the Legislative Assembly ==
Year	Winner	Party
1962	Virsinghbhai Jotibhai Bhabhor	Indian National Congress
1967	K.K. Parmar	Indian National Congress
1972	Jivabhai Motibhai Damor	Indian National Congress
1975	Jivabhai Motibhai Damor	Indian National Congress
1980	Jivabhai Motibhai Damor	Indian National Congress
1985	Prabodhkant Pandya	Janata Party
1990	Prabodhkant Pandya	Janata Dal
1995	Dr. Bhamat Mansingh Vallabhbhai	Indian National Congress
1998	Dr. Bhamat Mansingh Vallabhbhai	Indian National Congress
2002	Prabodhkant Pandya	Bharatiya Janata Party
2007	Paranjayadityasinhji Krishnakumarsinhji Parmar	Indian National Congress
2012	Damor Gendalbhai Motibhai	Indian National Congress
2017	Kuberbhai Dindor	Bharatiya Janata Party
2022	Kuberbhai Dindor	Bharatiya Janata Party

== Election results ==
=== 2022 ===
Gujarat Assembly election, 2022: Santrampur Assembly constituency
Party	Candidate	Votes	%	±%
BJP	Kuber Dindor	49964	34.99	▼14.9
INC	Gendalbhai Motibhai Damor	34387	24.08	▼20.38
Independent	Babubhai Hirabhai Damor	28631	20.05	▲20.05
AAP	Parvat Vagodia Fauji	24554	17.19	▲17.19
NOTA	None of the above	3039	2.13	
Majority			10.91	
Turnout				
Registered electors		233,219		
BJP hold		Swing		

=== 2017 ===
Gujarat Legislative Assembly Election, 2017: Santrampur
Party	Candidate	Votes	%	±%
BJP	Kuber Dindor	68,362	49.07	+16.14
INC	Gendalbhai Damor	61,938	44.46	−7.86
NCP	Raju Valavai	2,378	1.71	New
Majority		6,424	4.61	−15.5
Turnout		1,39,322	66.78	−3.54
BJP gain from INC		Swing		

=== 2012 ===
Gujarat Assembly Election, 2012
Party	Candidate	Votes	%	±%
INC	Gendalbhai Damor	68026	53.32	
BJP	Mansinh Bhamat	42372	33.21	
Majority		25654	20.11	
Turnout		127590	70.32	
INC hold		Swing		

== See also ==
- List of constituencies of Gujarat Legislative Assembly
- Gujarat Legislative Assembly
