= Vasad–Kathana line =

Railway line in Gujarat, India

Overview
- Status: Operational
- Owner: Indian Railways
- Locale: Gujarat
- Termini: Vasad; Kathana
- Stations: 6

Service
- Operator(s): Western Railway

Technical
- Track length: 43 km (27 mi)
- Number of tracks: 1
- Track gauge: 5 ft 6 in (1,676 mm) broad gauge
- Electrification: Yes

The Vasad–Kathana line belongs to Vadodara division of Western Railway zone in Gujarat State.

== History ==
Vasad–Kathana branch line was opened in 1953. The length of Vasad–Kathana branch line was 43 km.
