= Ajitsinh Chauhan =

Indian politician

Ajitsinh Parvatsinh Chauhan is an Indian politician. He is a Former Member of the Gujarat Legislative Assembly from the Balasinor Assembly constituency since 2017 to 2022. He is associated with the Indian National Congress.
