= Ranoli =

Coordinates: 22°24′10″N 72°47′36″E

- Census town
- Interactive map of Ranoli
- Country: India
- State: Gujarat
- District: Anand

Population (2001)
  - Total: 11,057

Languages
  - Official: Gujarati, Hindi
- Time zone: UTC+5:30 (IST)
- Vehicle registration: GJ

Ranoli is a census town in Anand district in the Indian state of Gujarat.

== Demographics ==
As of 2001 India census, Ranoli had a population of 11,057. Males constitute 54% of the population and females 46%. Ranoli has an average literacy rate of 74%, higher than the national average of 59.5%: male literacy is 1%, and female literacy is 65%. In Ranoli, 12% of the population is under 6 years of age.
