= Bajva =

- Location in Gujarat, India Bajva (India)
- Coordinates: 22.3183°N 73.112747°E
- Country: India
- State: Gujarat
- District: Vadodara

Population (2018)
  - Total: 1,999

Languages
  - Official: Gujarati, Hindi
- Time zone: UTC+5:30 (IST)
- Vehicle registration: GJ
- Website: gujaratindia.com

Bajva is a census town in Vadodara district in the state of Gujarat, India.

== Demographics ==
As of 2001 India census, Bajva had a population of 9118. Males constitute 53% of the population and females 47%. Bajva has an average literacy rate of 68%, higher than the national average of 59.5%; with 58% of the males and 42% of females literate. 12% of the population is under 6 years of age.
