= Balasinor State =

Princely state of India

Coordinates: 22.95°N 73.33°E

Balasinor State બાલાસિનોર રિયાસત
- Protectorate of the East India Company (1811–1857); Princely State of the British Raj (1857–1947); State of the Dominion of India (1947–1948)
- 1758–1949
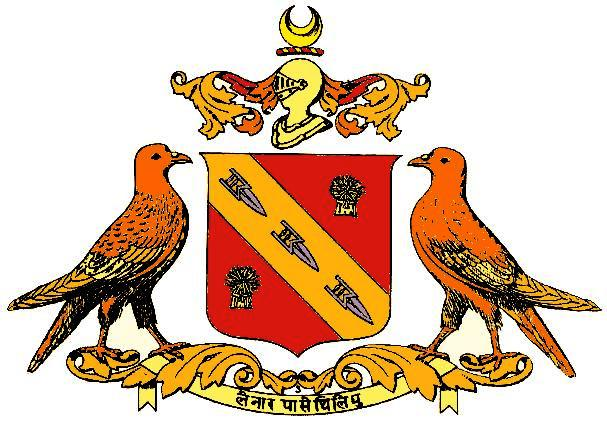
- Flag Coat of arms

- Balasinor State (dark blue) within Rewa Kantha Agency, British India
- Capital: Balasinor
- Area
  - 1901: 490 km^{2} (190 sq mi)
- Population
  - 1901: 32,618
- Government
  - Motto: "Lenar pasae thi lidhu" (I took from the taker)
- Nawab
  - 1758 – ?: Sardar Muhammed khan Babi
  - 1945 – 1947: Muhammad Salabat Khan
- History
  - Established: 1758
  - Independence of India: 1949
Succeeded by
India
- Today part of: Gujarat

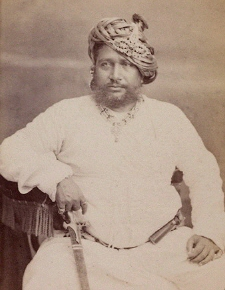
Nawab Mohammad Zorawar Khanji (1828–1882).

The State of Balasinor was a princely state in Balasinor during the era of British India and founded by Sardar Muhammed khan Babi and Murtuza Bhatia The last ruler of Balasinor signed the accession to join the Indian Union on 10 June 1948. Its rulers belonged to the family of Babi or Babai (Pashtun tribe) tribe. The state was founded by the Junagadh State Babi dynasty.

== History ==
Balasinor State was founded on 28 September 1758 by Gujarati Muslim ruler, Nawab, Sardar Muhammed khan Babi belonging to the family of last deputy Governor of Gujarat province in Mughal Empire. The rulers were titled Nawab Babi. It was a 9 gun salute state belonging to the Rewa Kantha Agency of the Bombay Presidency. The Last ruling Nawab Nawab was HH Nawab Muhammed Salabat Khanji II who died on 25 January 2018. The heir and son of Nawab Muhammed Salabat Khanji II Nawabzada Sultan Salauddinkhan Babi, born 1979 and educated at the Rajkumar College, Rajkot was crowned the titular Nawab of Balasinor on 4 March 2018 at the Raj Tilak and Gaadi Dastoor ceremony performed by both Islamic and Rajput traditions at their Garden Palace In Balasinor after the 40 days of mourning ended on 3 March 2018. It was well attended by royals from Gujarat and the people of Balasinor.

=== Rulers ===
- Sardar Muhammed khan Babi 28 September 1758 – 17..
- Jamiyat Khanji Muhammad Khanji 17.. – ...
- Salabat Khanji Jamiyat Khanji (b. ... d. 1820) – May 1820
- Abid Khanji May 1820 – 1822
- Jalal Khanji = Edal Khanji (b. ... d. 1831) 1822 – 2 December 1831
- Zorawar Khanji (b. 1828 d. 1882) 2 December 1831 – 30 November 1882
- Munawar Khanji Zorawar Khanji (b. 1846 d. 1899) 30 November 1882 – 24 March 1899
- Jamiyat Khanji Munawar Khanji (b. 1894 d. 1945) 24 March 1899 – 2 February 1945
- Muhammad Salabat Khan (b. 1944 d. 2018) 2 February 1945 – 25 January 2018
- Nawab Sultan Salauddinkhan Babi (b.1979)

== In pop culture ==
Princess Aaliya Sultana Babi, who in 2009 travelled to Ingatestone in the UK to find a husband. Her trip was recorded in BBC Three's Undercover Princesses.

The scion of this family, Salauddin Khan Babi participated in a similar show in the Netherlands in 2010 in which he was trying to find a wife. He lived and worked in Amsterdam. The show is currently on air on SBS6 in the Netherlands. It is called "Coming to Holland".

Nawabzada Salauddin was invited by TLC to participate in a US TV show called Secret Princes which was aired on 21 September 2012. It is a show based on the Undercover Princes. Salauddin lived and worked in Atlanta undercover for this show along with three other aristocrats. The royal family currently resides at The Garden Palace which they had converted into a heritage hotel.

== See also ==
- Pathans of Gujarat
- Political integration of India
- List of Sunni Muslim dynasties
