= Kathana, Gujarat =

Kathana
- Village
- Location in Gujarat, India Kathana (India)
- Coordinates: 22.292206°N 72.789415°E
- Country: India
- State: Gujarat
- District: Anand

Population (2011)
  - Total: 11,882

Languages
  - Official: Gujarati, Hindi
- Time zone: UTC+5:30 (IST)
- PIN: 388550
- Vehicle registration: GJ
- Website: gujaratindia.com

Kathana is a large village in Anand district in the Indian state of Gujarat.

== Demographics ==
As of 2011 India census, Kathana had a population of 11,882. Males constitute 52.68% of the population and females 47.32%. Kathana has an average literacy rate of 81.64%: male literacy is 92.75%, and female literacy is 69.34%. In Kathana, 13.88% of the population is under 6 years of age.

== Transport ==
=== Railway ===
Kathana railway station is located on the Western Railway Ahmedabad – Vadodara Segment. It is 43 km from Vasad, 62 km from Vadodara.
