= Balasinor =

Balasinor Vadasinor Vadsol
- City
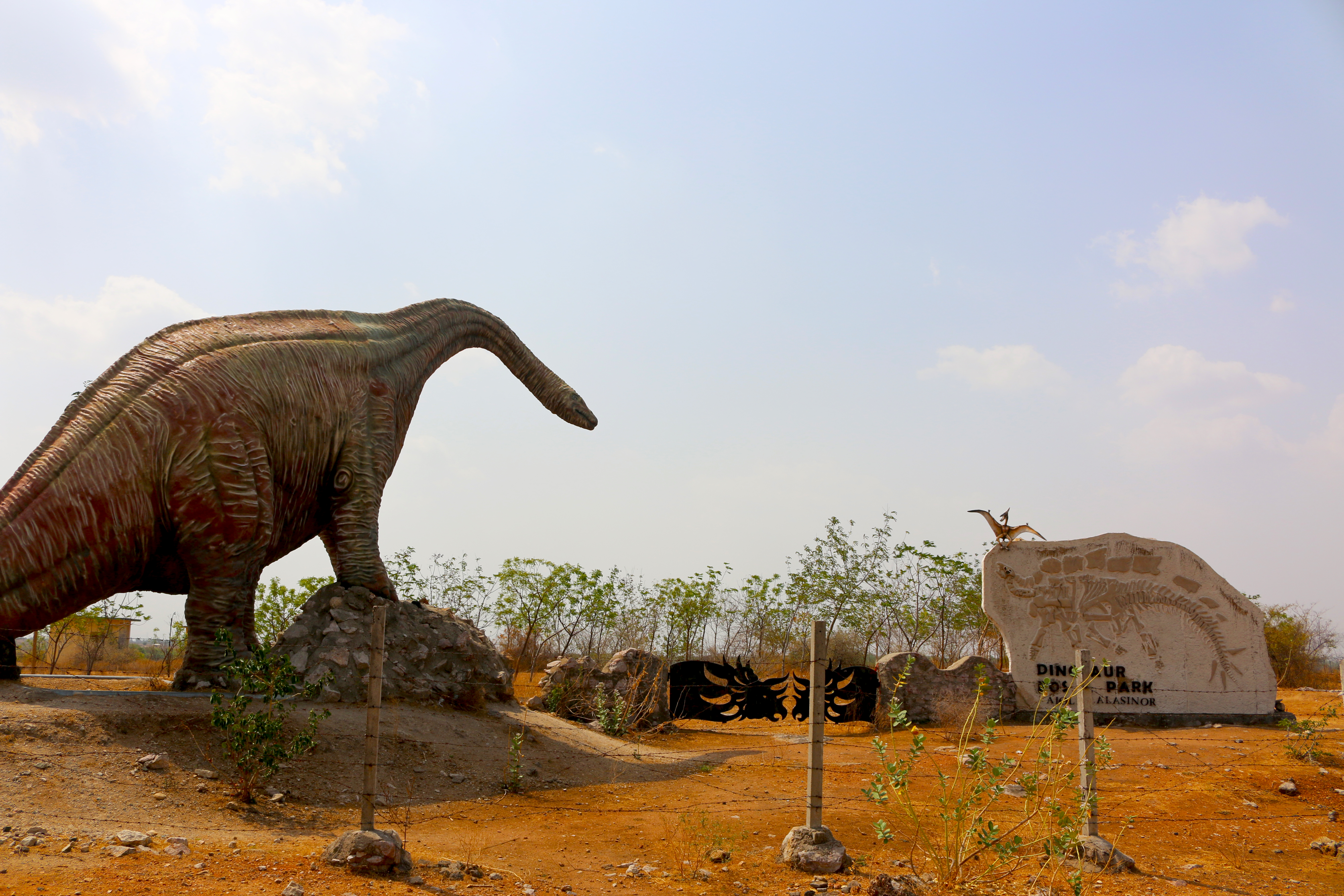
- Nickname: Land of Dinosaurs
- Location in Gujarat, India Balasinor (India) Balasinor (Asia)
- Coordinates: 22°57′22″N 73°20′08″E
- Country: India
- State: Gujarat
- District: Mahisagar
- Elevation: 72 m (236 ft)

Population (2011)
  - Total: 39,330

Language
  - Official: Gujarati
  - Additional official: Hindi
- Time zone: UTC+5:30 (IST)
- PIN: 388255
- Telephone code: 02690
- Vehicle registration: GJ 07 to GJ35

Balasinor, also known as Vadasinor, is a city located in the Mahisagar district of Gujarat, India. The city was formerly part of Balasinor State, a princely state ruled by the Babi dynasty, from September 1758 until its accession to India in June 1948.

== History ==
Balasinor State was founded in the 18th century. The rulers were titled Nawab Babi. Once a princely state under Presidencies and provinces of British India, it was ruled by the Babi dynasty, descendants of the Pathan rulers of Gujarat, who played a significant role in the region's politics. Balasinor is internationally famous for its Dinosaur Fossil Park in Raiyoli village, which houses one of the largest collections of dinosaur fossils in India, including eggs and bones from the Jurassic and Cretaceous periods. Often referred to as the "Jurassic Park of India, Indroda Dinosaur and Fossil Park" the site has fossils of species like the Rajasaurus narmadensis. The town's cultural fabric reflects a confluence of Islamic and Hindu traditions, evident in its historical mosques, palaces, and temples. Additionally, the Balasinor Royal Family, particularly Princess Aaliya Sultana Babi, has actively promoted the town's history and its fossil park, boosting its tourism potential and preserving its legacy.

== Geography ==
Balasinor is located at 22.95°N 73.33°E, on the National Highway Number 47 and the Gujarat State Highway Number 2.

== Demographics ==
As of 2011 Indian census, Balasinor had a total population of 39,330, of which 20,282 were males and 19,048 were females. The population within the age group of 0 to 6 years was 4,946. The total number of literates in Balasinor was 30,314, which constituted 77.1% of the population with male literacy of 81.3% and female literacy of 72.5%. The effective literacy rate of 7+ population of Balasinor was 88.2%, of which male literacy rate was 93.8% and female literacy rate was 82.2%. The Scheduled Castes and Scheduled Tribes population was 3,603 and 331 respectively. Balasinor had 7591 households in 2011.

As of the 2001 Indian census, Balasinor had a population of 33,704. It had a literacy rate of 70.5% and a ratio of 940 women for every 1000 men. 12.6% of the population was between the ages of 0 and 6.

According to Chambers's Concise Gazetteer of the World, from 1914, the population of Balasinor town was approximately 9,000 at the time.

== India's Jurassic Park ==
In 1981, palaeontologists stumbled upon dinosaur bones and fossils during a regular geological survey of this mineral-rich area. They found dinosaur egg hatcheries and fossils of at least 13 species of which the most important discovery was that of a carnivorous abelisaurid theropod named Rajasaurus narmadensis, a previously unknown predator that was 25 to 30 feet long and two-thirds the size of the Tyrannosaurus rex. It lived in the Late Cretaceous period.

The news of the find was welcomed in the neighbouring villages. Many residents brought the fossilised eggs home and worshipped them. Since then excavations have turned up a veritable trove of dinosaur remains—eggs, bones, a skeleton which is now kept in a Calcutta (Kolkata) museum—bringing hordes of scientists and tourists to Balasinor.

Researchers, after piecing together the evidence in Raiyoli, believe that Gujarat is home to one of the largest clutches of dinosaur hatcheries in the world. At least 13 species of dinosaurs lived there, for more than 100 million years until their extinction 65 million years ago. The soft soil made hatching and protecting eggs easier for the animals. Many researchers call them the best-preserved eggs in the world after the ones found in Aix-en-Provence in France.

These fossilised dinosaur remains have triggered what tourism officials of the Gujarat state call "Dinosaur Tourism". Princess Aaliya also called the Dinosaur Princess conducts guided tours of the fossil park.

Another notable discovery in the village of Dholi Dungri, bordering Balasinor taluka, was that of Sanajeh indicus, a primitive madtsoiid snake that likely preyed on sauropod dinosaur hatchlings and embryos.
