= Kathana railway station =

Railway station in Gujarat, India

General information
- Location: Kathana, Anand district India
- Coordinates: 22°14′13″N 72°45′09″E
- Elevation: 26 metres (85 ft)
- System: Indian Railway Station
- Owner: Ministry of Railways, Indian Railways
- Operator: Western Railway
- Line: Vasad–Kathana line
- Platforms: 1
- Tracks: 1

Construction
- Structure type: Standard (On Ground)
- Parking: No

Other information
- Status: Functioning
- Station code: KTNA
- Zone(s): Western Railway
- Division(s): Vadodara
Location
- Location within India Location within Gujarat

Kathana railway station is a railway station on the Western Railway network in the state of Gujarat, India. Passenger trains start from Kathana railway station. Kathana railway station is connected by rail to Vasad Junction and Vadodara Junction.

== Major Trains ==
Following trains start from Kathana railway station:

- 59101/02 Kathana - Vadodara Passenger

== See also ==
- Anand district
