= Kadana Dam =

- Location within India
- Interactive map of Kadana Dam
- Country: India
- Location: Mahisagar district
- Coordinates: 23°18′26.12″N 73°49′38.12″E
- Purpose: Power generation, irrigation, water storage
- Status: Operational
- Construction began: 1979
- Opening date: 1989; 37 years ago
- Construction cost: ₹20 billion (equivalent to ₹230 billion or US$2.4 billion in 2026)
- Owner: Government of Gujarat

Dam and spillways
- Type of dam: Masonry dam
- Impounds: Mahi River
- Height: 66 m (217 ft)
- Length: 575 m (1,886 ft)

Reservoir
- Active capacity: 1.203 km^{3} (4.25×10^{10} cu ft)
- Catchment area: 25,520 km^{2} (9,850 sq mi)

Kadana power plant
- Commission date: Stage I: 1990; Stage II: 1998
- Turbines: Stage I: 2 x 60 MW reversible Francis-type; Stage II: 2 x 60 MW Francis-type
- Installed capacity: 240 MW

National Geological Monuments of India
- Official name: Eddy Current Markings, Kadana Village
- Designated: 1976
- Designated by: Geological Survey of India

Kadana Dam is an earthen and masonry dam on the Mahi River in Mahisagar district of the Indian state of Gujarat. The construction of the dam began in 1979 and was completed in 1989.

== Power station ==
The dam has a pumped-storage hydroelectric power station, with an installed capacity of 240 (MW). The first two generators were commissioned in 1990 by the famous Chief Engineer; Shri Girdharbhai Ghelabhai Mistry, and two more were added in 1998. The first two generators are equipped with reversible kaplan turbines that allow the power station to generate power during the peak hours and pump the water back into the reservoir during low usage hours.

| Stage | Unit | Capacity (MW) | Date |
|---|---|---|---|
| Stage I | 1 | 60 | 1990 March |
| Stage I | 2 | 60 | 1990 September |
| Stage II | 3 | 60 | 1998 January |
| Stage II | 4 | 60 | 1998 May |

== Eddy Current Markings ==
The Eddy Current Markings in Kadana were notified as a National Geological Monument in 1976. These markings represent a rare geological feature associated with the geology and evolution of the Aravalli region. The marking appear as radiating circular patterns on sandstone–quartzite rocks belonging to the Upper Aravalli Lunavada Group of Precambrian–Proterozoic age. During the orogeny of the Aravallis, soft and fragmented sedimentary rocks were transformed into metamorphic rocks under intense deformation. The resulting shearing stress produced features such as cross-stratification, horizontal stratification, planar cross-bedding, flute marks, and groove marks. Pebbles or gravel fragments trapped during this deformation, produced radiating circular markings through shearing, torsion and compression.

== See also ==
- Mahi Bajaj Sagar Dam
