= Vadodara–Ahmedabad Intercity Express =

Train in India

Vadodara-Ahmedabad Intercity Express
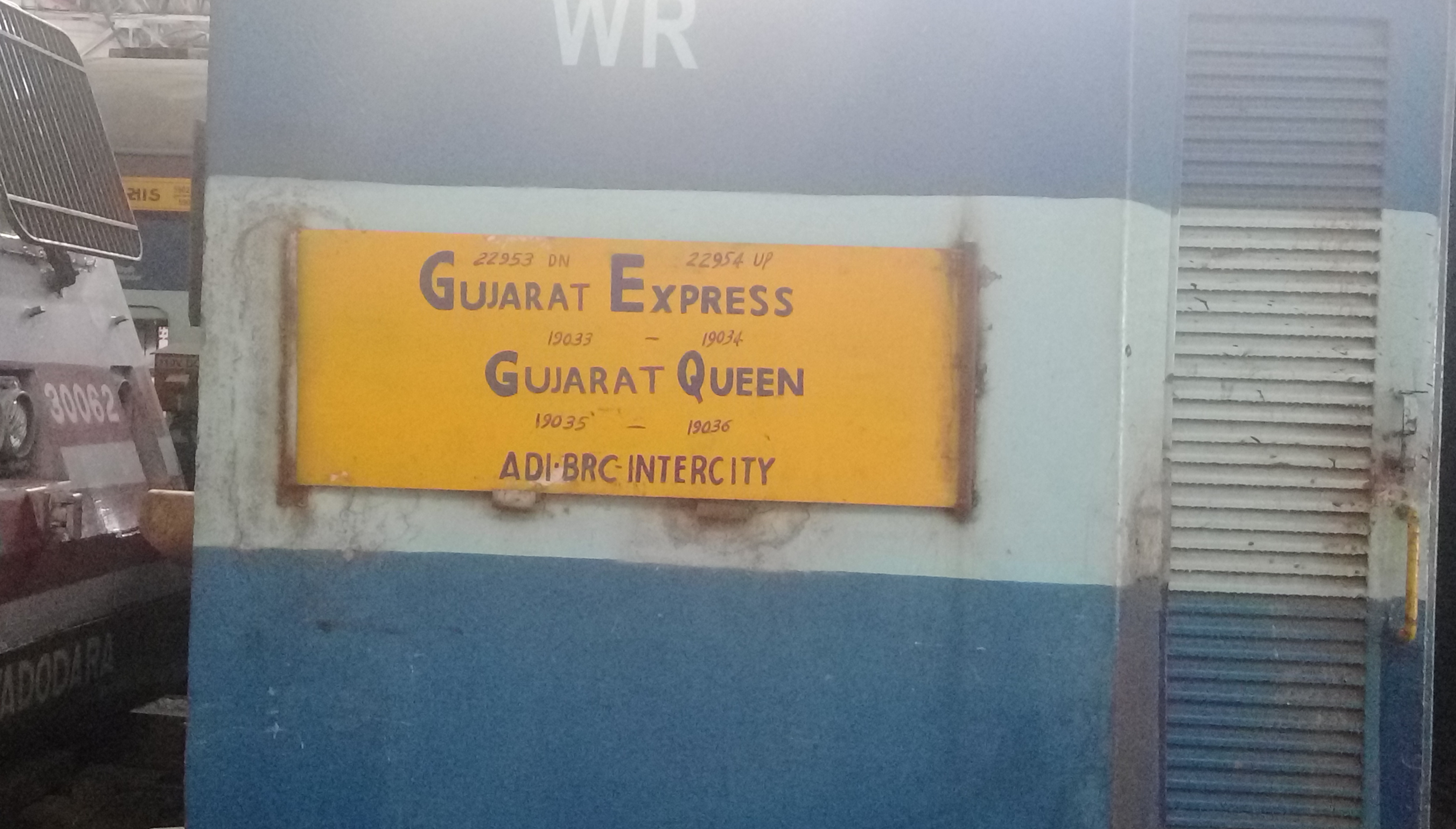

Overview
- Service type: Express
- Locale: Gujarat
- Current operator: Western Railway

Route
- Termini: Vadodara (BRC); Ahmedabad (ADI)
- Stops: 8
- Distance travelled: 100 km (62 mi)
- Average journey time: 2 hours 40 minutes
- Service frequency: Daily
- Train number: 19035 / 19036

On-board services
- Classes: AC Chair Car & General Unreserved
- Seating arrangements: Yes
- Sleeping arrangements: No
- Auto-rack arrangements: Overhead racks
- Catering facilities: On-board catering, E-catering
- Observation facilities: Rake sharing with * 22953/22954 Gujarat SF Express, * 19033/19034 Gujarat Queen
- Baggage facilities: No
- Other facilities: Below the seats

Technical
- Rolling stock: ICF coach
- Track gauge: 1,676 mm (5 ft 6 in)
- Operating speed: 110 km/h (68 mph) maximum, 40 km/h (25 mph) average including halts.

The 19035 / 19036 Vadodara-Ahmedabad Intercity Express is an express train belonging to Indian Railways that run between Vadodara Junction and Ahmedabad Junction in India. It is currently being operated with 19035/19036 train numbers on daily basis,

It operates as train number 19035 from Vadodara Junction to Vatva and as train number 19036 from Maninagar to Vadodara Junction due to redevelopment work at Ahmedabad Junction serving the state of Gujarat.

== Service ==
The train covers the distance of 100.1 km (62.2 mi) in 2 hours approximately at a speed of (40.5 km/h (25.2 mph)).

== Routeing ==
The 19035/36 Vadodara Ahmedabad Intercity Express runs from Vadodara Junction via Bajva, Anand Junction, Nadiad Junction to Maninagar.

== Gallery ==
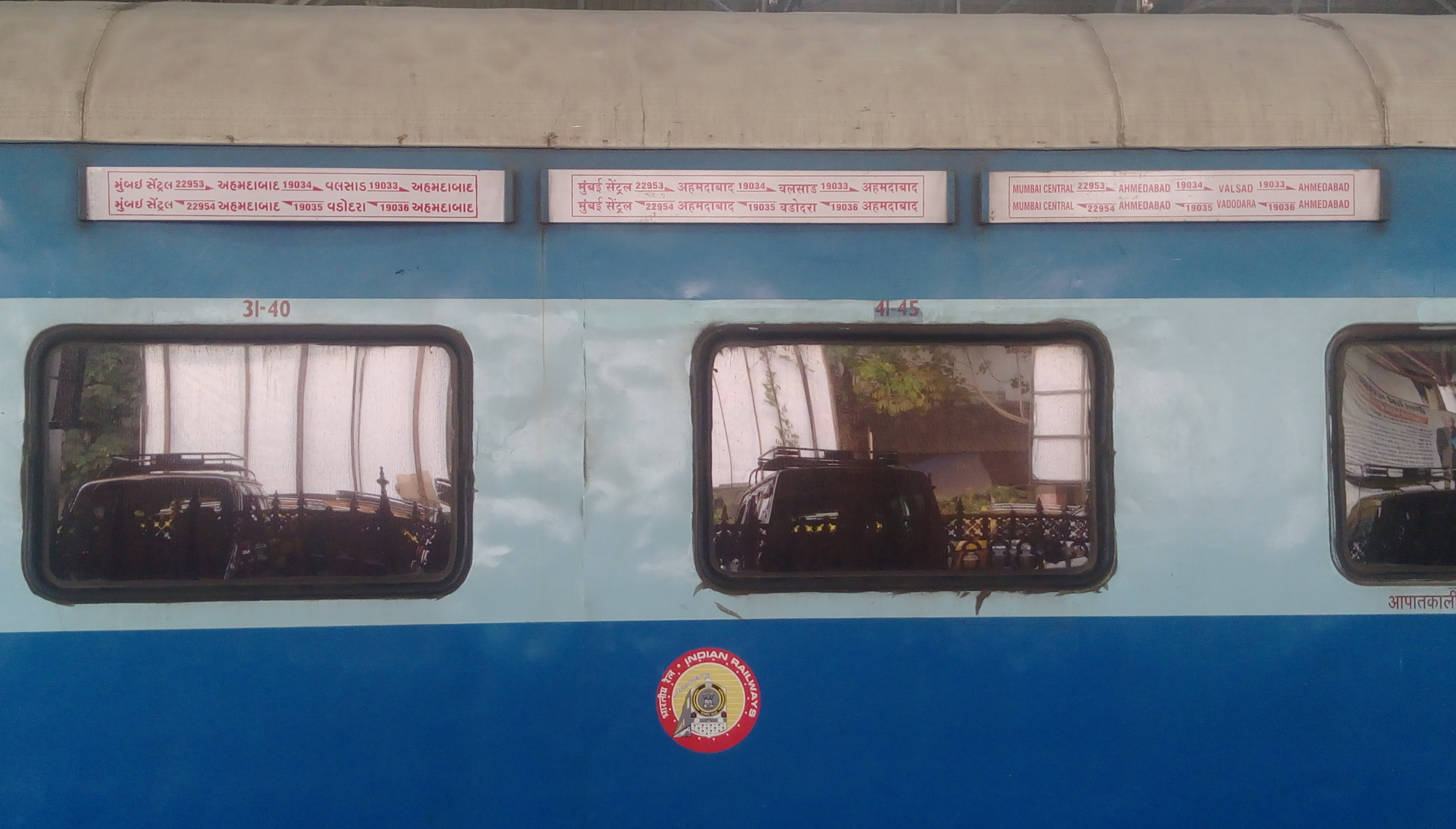
Vadodara Ahmedabad Intercity Express - AC Chair Car coach

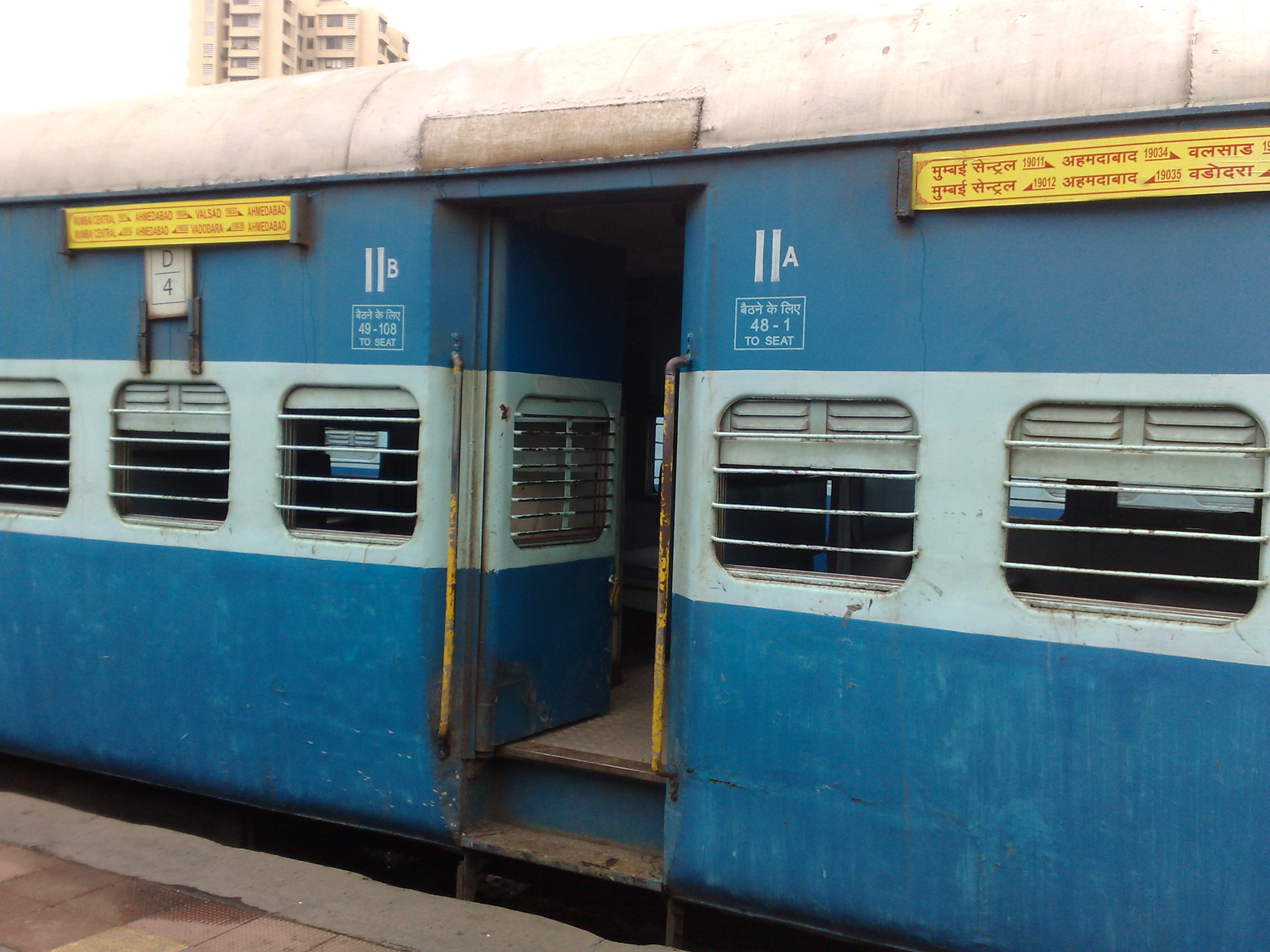
Vadodara Ahmedabad Intercity Express - 2nd Class seating coach

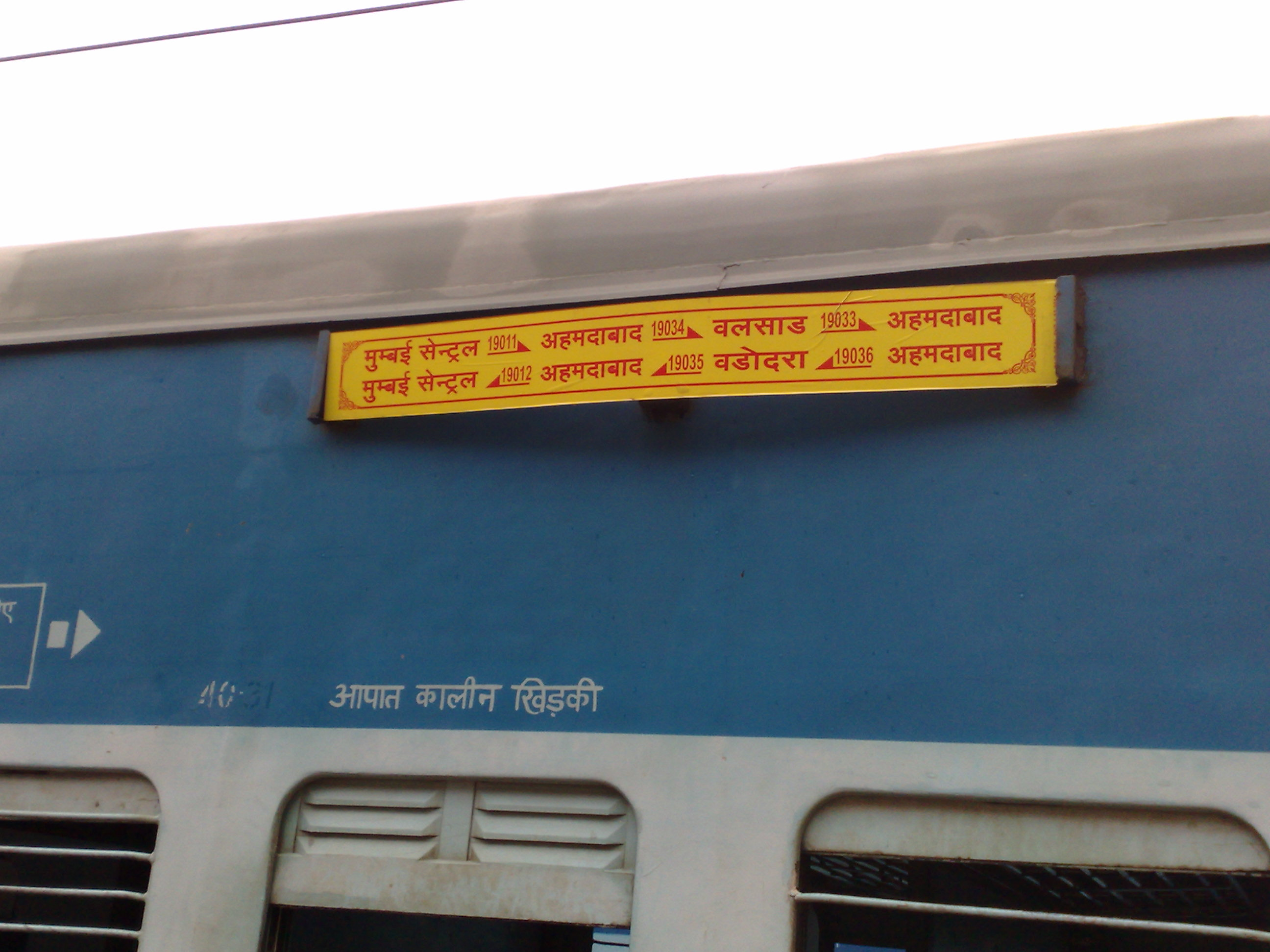
Vadodara Ahmedabad Intercity Express - Coach board

== Coaches ==
The train consists of 21 coaches:

- 3 AC Chair Car
- 16 General Unreserved
- 2 Seating cum Luggage Rake

As with most train services in India, Coach Composition may be amended at the discretion of Indian Railways depending on demand.

Loco	1	2	3	4	5	6	7	8	9	10	11	12	13	14	15	16	17	18	19	20	21
	SLR	GEN	GEN	GEN	GEN	GEN	GEN	GEN	GEN	GEN	GEN	GEN	GEN	GEN	GEN	C3	C2	C1	GEN	GEN	SLR

== Traction ==
It is hauled by a Vadodara Loco Shed based WAP-5 / WAP-7 electric locomotive on its entire journey.
