= Sant State =

Former Hindu Kingdom

Coordinates: 23.18947°N 73.8928°E

- Princely state of British India
- 1255–1950
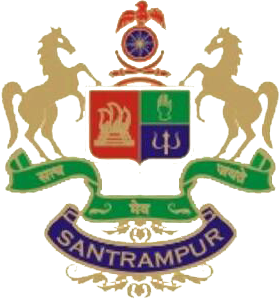
- Coat of arms
- Capital: Santrampur
- Area
  - 1901: 1,367 km^{2} (528 sq mi)
- History
  - Established: 1255
  - Accession to the Union of India: 1950
Succeeded by
India
- Today part of: India

The Kingdom of Santrampur or later Sant State was a kingdom and later a princely state in subsidiary alliance with British India. It was ruled by Mahipavat branch of the Paramara dynasty.

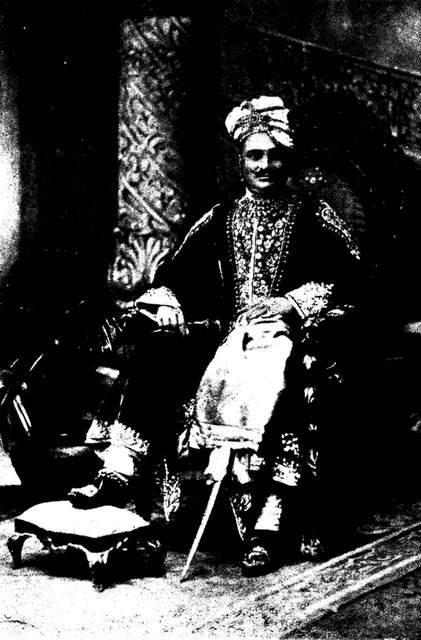
H.H. Maharana Shri Joraver Sinhji, The Raja of Sant State c. 1922

The capital of the state was Santrampur. It covered an area of approximately 1,367 km^{2} and was bounded on the north by the dominions of Dungarpur and Banswara in Rajputana. On the east was the sub division of Jhalod in the Panch Mahals. On the south it touched the small state of Sanjeli while on the west it was bounded by the State of Lunavada.

The State enjoyed a hereditary salute of 9 gun and 11 gun local salute. The ruler of Sant State signed the accession to the Indian Union after Indian independence.

== History ==
In 1753, The Maharawal of Banswara State, killed the three sons of Rana Ratansinhjii and tried to capture the throne of Sant State; the fourth son who was an infant named Badansinghji was hidden by Kolis of Malwa and grew up in a Koli family. The Maharawal annexed the Sant State in Banswara State and established his army in Sant. After several years, when Badansinghji reached maturity, the Kolis of Malwa attacked the army of Banswara. The Kolis of Malwa defeated the army of Maharawal and threw it out of Sant state. After that, Kolis of Malwa established Rana Badansinhji at the throne of Sant State.

== Rulers ==
The rulers of Sant belong to the Parmar clan of Rajputs. They are descended from Vikramaditya and Bhoja.

== See also ==
- Bombay Presidency
- List of Indian princely states (alphabetical)
