= Mahi River =

Coordinates: 22°16′N 72°58′E

Mahi River (मही नदी, મહી નદી)
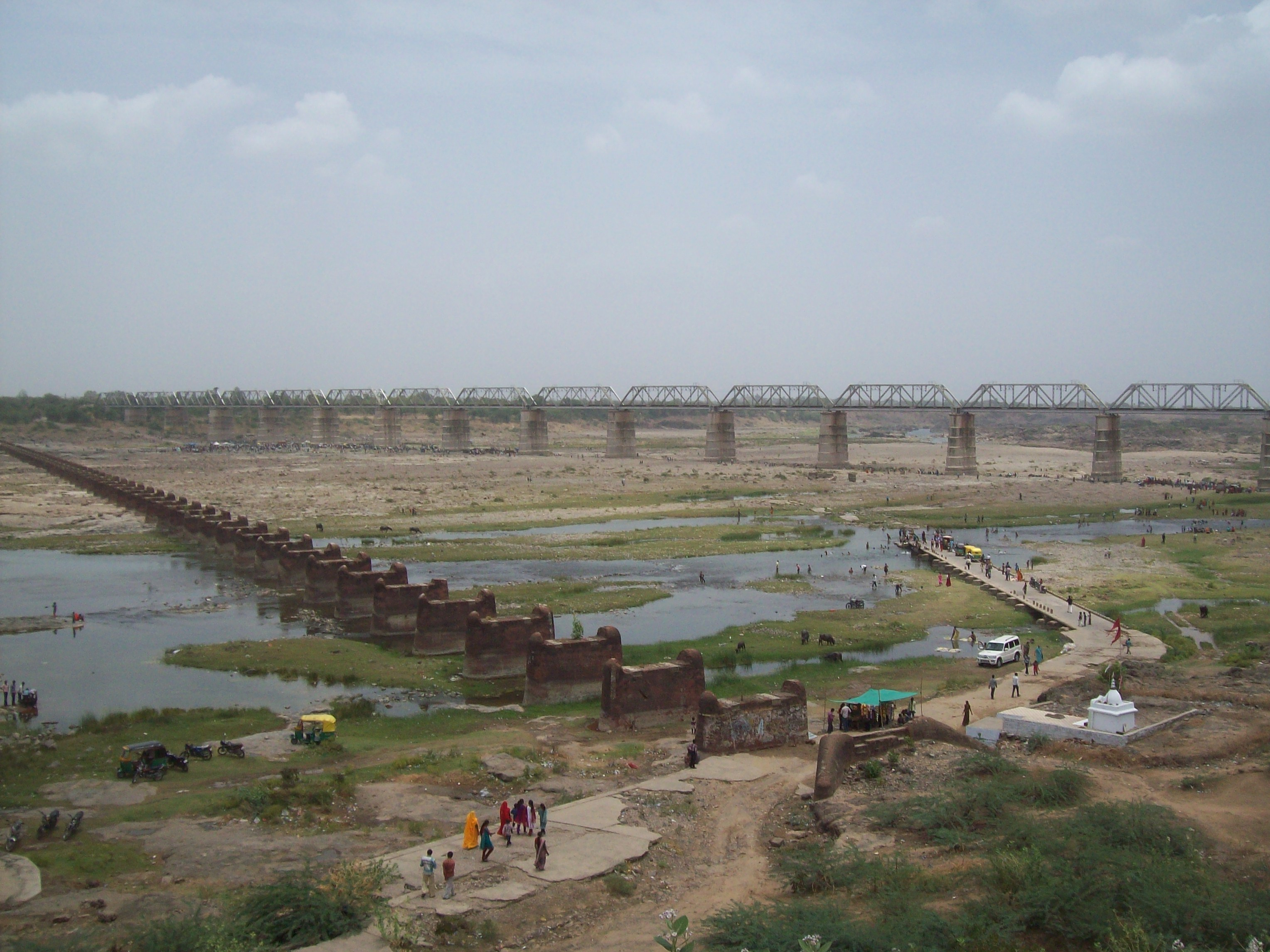
- Mahi River at Sevaliya near Vadodara

Location
- Country: India
- State: Madhya Pradesh, Rajasthan, Gujarat

Physical characteristics
- Source
  - location: • Madhya Pradesh, Vindhyas • Rajasthan, Vagad Region
- Mouth: Gulf of Khambhat (Arabian Sea)
  - location: Near Kathana railway station, Kathana, Anand District, Gujarat
- Length: 580 km (360 mi) approx.
- Discharge
  - location: Sevalia
  - average: 383 m^{3}/s (13,500 cu ft/s)
  - minimum: 0 m^{3}/s (0 cu ft/s)
  - maximum: 10,887 m^{3}/s (384,500 cu ft/s)

The Mahi River near Gujarat among other Indian rivers

The Mahi (મહી નદી, मही नदी) is a river in western India. It rises in Madhya Pradesh and, after flowing through the Vagad region of Rajasthan, enters Gujarat and flows into the Arabian Sea. It is one of the relatively few west-flowing rivers in India, alongside the endorheic Luni River, the Sabarmati River, the Tapi River and the Narmada River. Most peninsular rivers in India flow eastward into the Bay of Bengal or northward into the Ganges River.

It has given its name to the Mahi Kantha agency of Bombay, and also to the mehwasis, marauding highlanders often mentioned in Arabian chronicles.

The Mahi River originates near Minda village, which is situated in Dhar district of Madhya Pradesh.

The Mahi River rises in the western Vindhya Range, just south of Sardarpur, and flows northward through Madhya Pradesh state. Turning northwest, it enters Rajasthan state and then turns southwest to flow through Gujarat state through the north of Vadodara city outskirts and enters the sea by a wide estuary before Khambhat after about a 360-mile (580-km) course. The silt brought down by the Mahi has contributed to the shallowing of the Gulf of Khambhat and the abandonment of its once-prosperous ports. The riverbed lies considerably lower than the land level and is of little use for irrigation.

The river is worshipped by many people and has many temples and places of worship along its shore. It is popularly described as Mahisagar due to the vastness of the river. The newly formed Mahisagar district in Gujarat derives its name from this pious river. This river crosses the Tropic of Cancer twice.

The ancient Greeks called it Mais (Ancient Greek: Μαϊς).

== Dams ==
=== Banswara Dam ===
Mahi Bajaj Sagar Dam is a dam across the Mahi River. It is situated 16 kilometres from Banswara town in Banswara district Rajasthan, India. The dam was constructed between 1972 and 1983 for the purposes of hydroelectric power generation and water supply. It is the second-largest dam in Rajasthan. It is named after Shri Jamnala Bajaj. It hosts many crocodiles and turtles. There are many islands within the catchment area of the dam, so Banswara also called popularly called as "City of Hundred Islands". The dam is easily accessible by road. The dam has an installed capacity of 140 MW.

The Mahi River flowing into the Gulf of Khambhat is on the verge of extinction due to pollution and salinity. Fisherfolk and non-governmental organisations (NGOs) of Vadodara, Gujarat, blame the construction of bunds on the Mahi by the Vadodara Municipal Corporation for the situation. "The bunds constructed to collect water have stopped the surface movement of the river," say the NGO's. Consequently, the river is facing an intrusion of saline water from sea as there is no surface flow to push the seawater back during a low tide. "The groundwater in many areas might become saline due to this. in the past year 2016 around 600-800 turtles have died because of the excess salinity in the water. The Mahi river is in a very bad state now."

=== Kadana Dam ===
It was built in 1979 in the villages of Kadana, Tal: kadana Dist: Mahisagar District, Gujarat. It was constructed to provide irrigation, hydropower and flood protection.

=== Wanakbori dam (Weir) ===
The Wanakbori dam (weir) is established near Wanakbori village. The Wanakbori thermal power station uses the water of the river Mahi. There are eight units for the production of electricity.
