= Mahisagar district =

- District of Gujarat
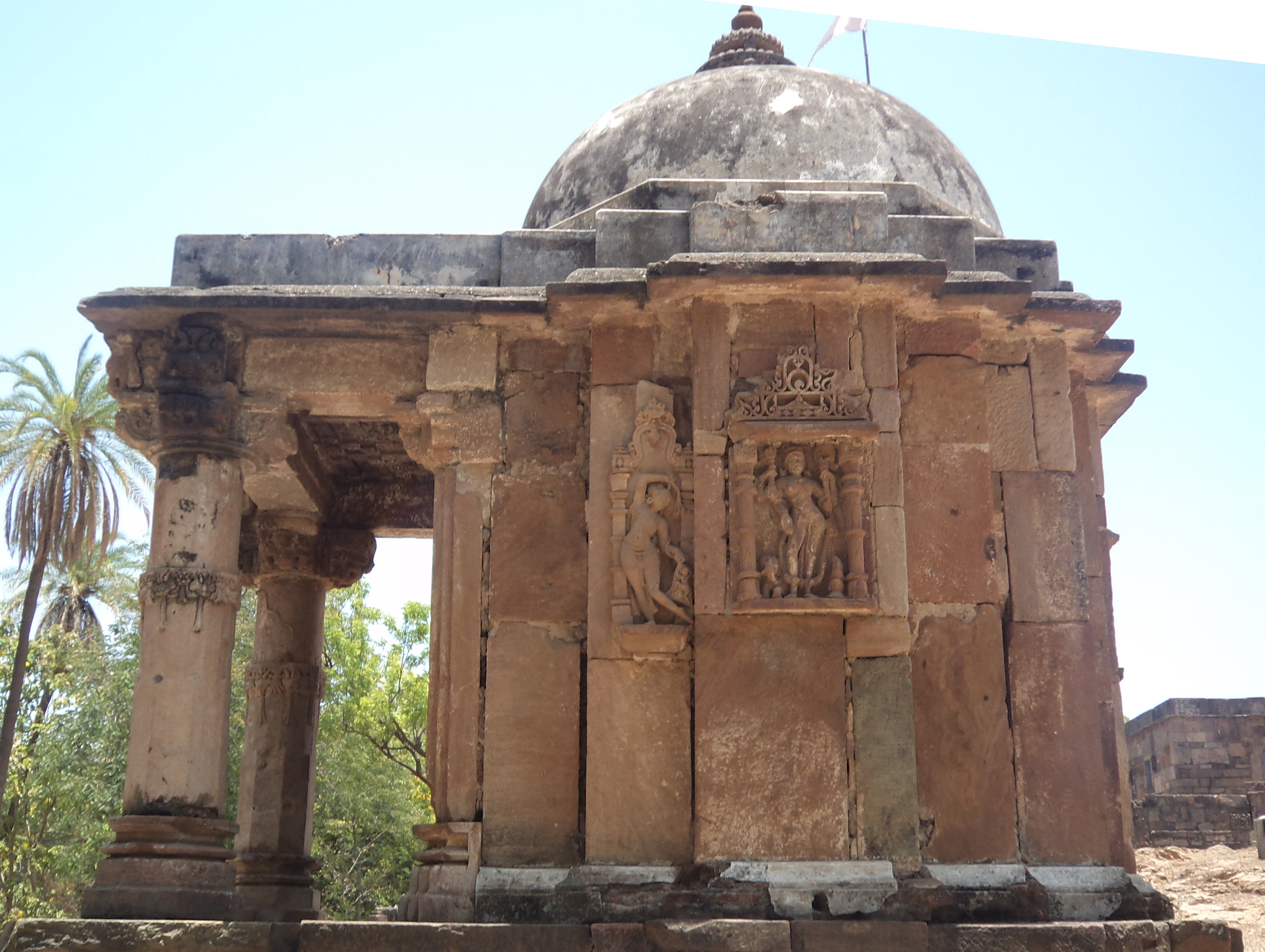
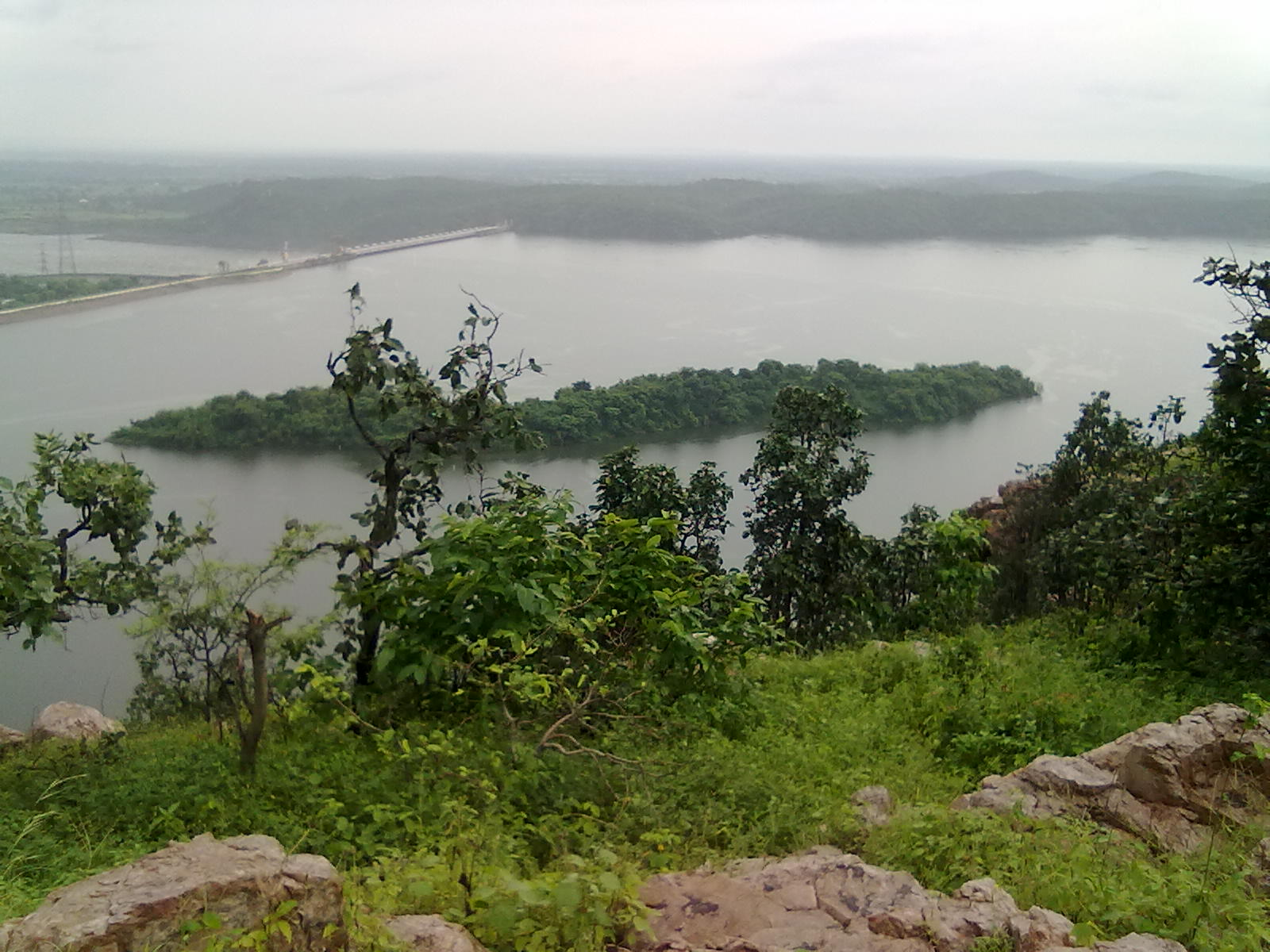
- Temple with a Dome, Kaleshwari; Bottom: Kadana Dam

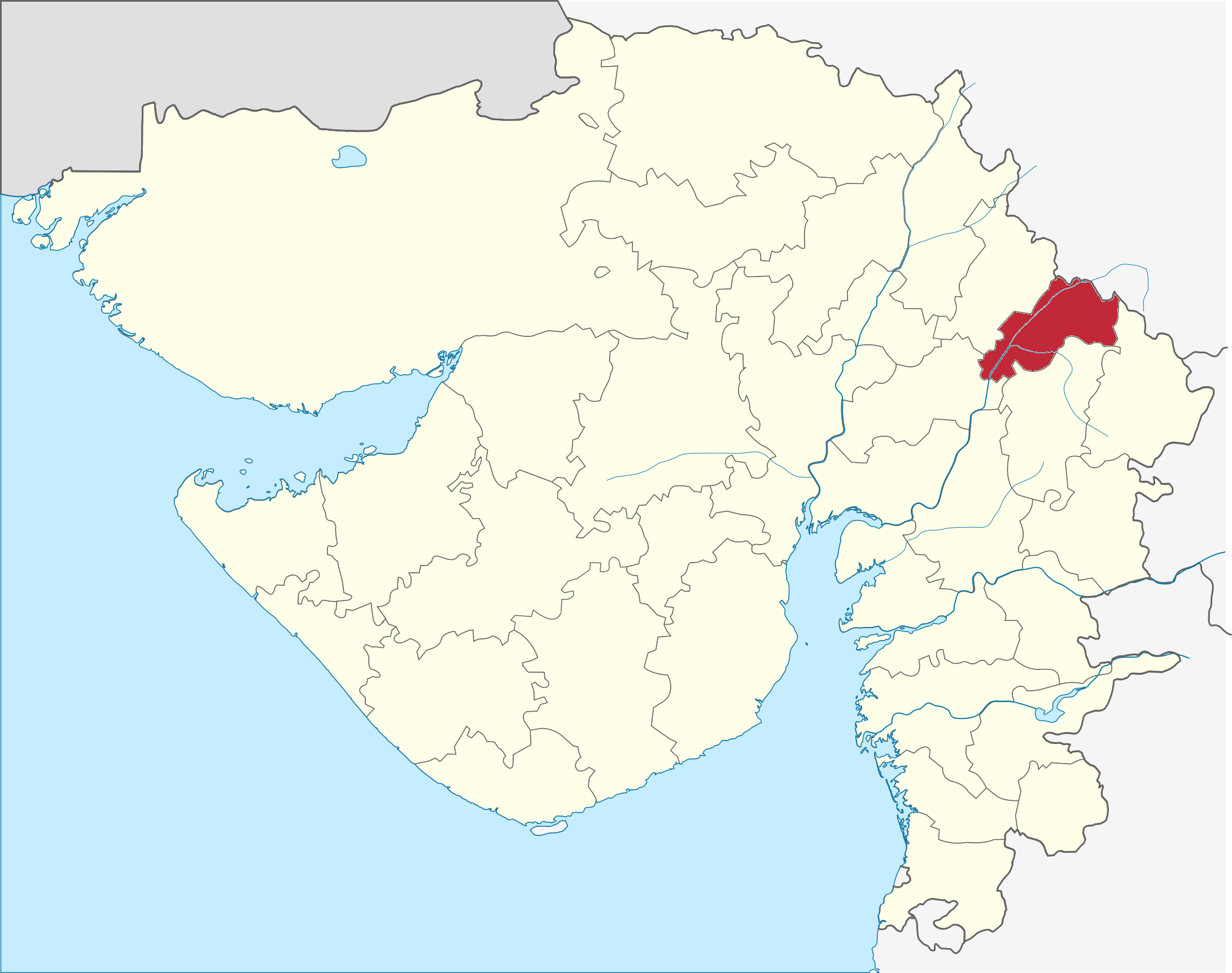
- Location in Gujarat
- Interactive map of Mahisagar district
- Coordinates: 23°06′N 73°36′E
- Country: India
- State: Gujarat
- Headquarters: Lunawada
- Established: 15 August 2013
- Named for: Mahi River

Government
  - Type: District Panchayat

Area
  - Total: 2,260.64 km^{2} (872.84 sq mi)

Population (2011)
  - Total: 994,624
  - Density: 439.975/km^{2} (1,139.53/sq mi)

Languages
  - Official: Gujarati, Hindi, English
- Time zone: UTC+5:30 (IST)
- PIN: 389230
- Telephone code: +912674
- Vehicle registration: GJ-35
- Website: mahisagar.nic.in

Mahisagar district is a district in the state of Gujarat in India that came into being on 26 January 2013, becoming the 28th district of the state. The district has been carved out of the Panchmahal district and the Kheda district. District Name Mahisagar given from "Mahi River". Lunawada is the district headquarters of Mahisagar. It started its operation in full-fledged from 15 August 2013.

== Demographics ==
At the time of the 2011 census, Mahisagar district had a population of 9,94,624, of which 105,987 (10.66%) lived in urban areas. Mahisagar had a sex ratio of 947 females per 1000 males. Scheduled Castes and Scheduled Tribes make up 50,862 (5.11%) and 350,217 (35.21%) of the population respectively.

Religions in Mahisagar district (2011)
Religion	Percent
Hinduism	93.85%
Islam	5.89%
Other or not stated	0.26%

Hindus are in majority with 933,421, while Muslims are 58,546.

Gujarati is the predominant language, spoken by 98.95% of the population.

== Politics ==
District	No.	Constituency	Name	Party	Remarks
Mahisagar	121	Balasinor	Mansinh Chauhan		
Mahisagar	122	Lunawada	Gulabsinh Chauhan	Indian National Congress	
Mahisagar	123	Santrampur (ST)	Kuber Dindor	Bharatiya Janata Party	MoS

== Geographic Profile ==
SR. NO	TALUKA	AREA (HECTARE)	NO. VILLAGE	DISTA. FROM DIST. HEAD QUARTER	LAND UNDER CULTIVA-TION (HECTARE)	FOREST
1	Balasinor	30159	47	47	26186.00	2,559.00
2	Kadana	40255	136	36	25449.00	9,570.00
3	Khanpur	27833	86	30	17710.00	8,071.00
4	Lunawada	51645	243	0	70658.00	9,146.00
5	Santrampur	54716	153	32	30624.00	11,060.00
6	Virpur	21456	52	30	14483.00	1,071.00
	Total	2,26,064	717		1,85,110.00	13,497.20
