= Lunavada State =

British Raj princely state in India

Coordinates: 23.1333°N 73.6167°E

- Princely State of British India
- 1434–1948
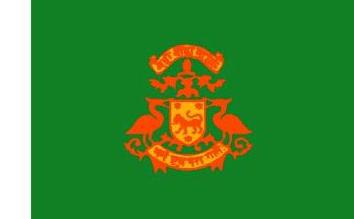
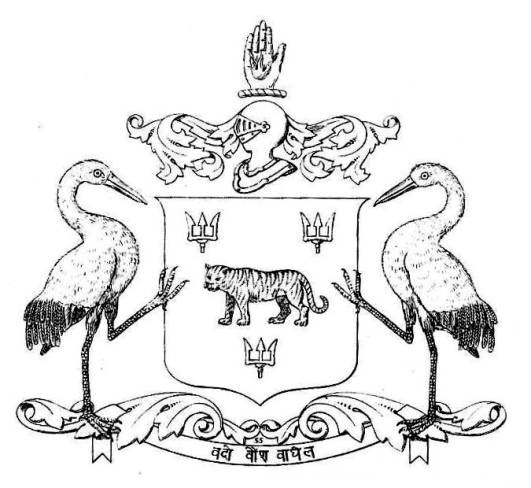
- Flag Coat of arms

- Lunavada State (violet) within Rewa Kantha Agency, British India
- Capital: Lunavada
- Area
  - 1901: 1,005 km^{2} (388 sq mi)
- Population
  - 1901: 63,967
- History
  - Established: 1434
  - Accession to the Union of India: 1948
Succeeded by
India

Lunavada State, also known as Lunawada State, was a princely state in India during the time of the British Raj. Its last ruler acceded to the Union of India on 10 June 1948.

Lunavada State had an area of 1,005 km² and fell under the Rewa Kantha Agency of the Bombay Presidency, later integrated into the Baroda and Gujarat States Agency. Its capital was located in Lunavada town in present-day Gujarat state, India.

== History ==
According to tradition the predecessor state was established in 1225 by descendants of Sidhraj, Raja of Anhilwara Patan, as the state of Virpur. In 1434, Rana Bhimsinghji moved the capital to Lunavada on the other side of the Mahi River. Before the town was established, the area was controlled by the princely state of Santrampur, ruled by Puwar Rajputs.

In 1826 Lunavada State became a British protectorate and was a second class state in the Rewa Kantha Agency. The capital was Lunavada town, said to have been founded in 1434. The 1901 census records that the population had a decrease of 28% in the previous decade, due to famine.

Col. HH Maharaja Sri Virbhadrasinhji Ranjitsinjhi 1929/1986, born 8 June 1910 in Lunawada, invested with full ruling powers on 2 October 1930, Member of the Chamber of Princes, married Maharajkumari Manher Kunwari [HH Maharani Kusum Kunwari of Lunawada], daughter of Capt. HH Maharana Raj Saheb Shri Sir Amarsinhji Banesinhji (Gangubha) of Wankaner, and had issue. He died in 1986.

=== Rulers ===
The rulers had the title 'Rana' and were accorded a status of 9-gun salute by the British authorities.

==== Ranas ====
- 1674 - 1711 Bir Singh (d. 1711)
- 1711 - 1735 Nar Singh (d. 1735)
- 1735 - 1757 Wakhat Singh (d. 1757)
- 1757 - 1782 Dip Singh (d. 1782)
- 1782 - 1786 Durjan Singh (d. 1786)
- 1786 Jagat Singh
- 1786 - 1818 Partab Singh
- 1818 - 1849 Fateh Singh (d. 1849)
- 1849 - 1851 Dalpat Singh (d. 1851)
- 1851 - 1852 interregnum
- 1852 - Jun 1867 Dalil Singh (d. 1867)
- 31 Oct 1867 – 27 Apr 1929 Wakhat Singh Dalil Singh (b. 1860 - d. 1929) (from 25 May 1889, Sir Wakhat Singh Dalil Singh)
- 27 Apr 1929 – 15 Aug 1947 Virbhadra Singh Ranjit Singh (b. 1910 - d. 1986)

== See also ==
- List of Rajput dynasties
- Political integration of India
