= Udai Singh II of Dungarpur =

Maharawal of Dungarpur from 1844 to 1898

Maharawal Sir Udai Singh II
- Maharawal of Dungarpur

Maharawal of Dungarpur
- Reign: 1844 –1898
- Coronation: 28 September 1847
- Investiture: 1857
- Predecessor: Jaswant Singh II
- Successor: Bijai Singh
- Regent: Dalpat Singh (1844 – 1852); Safdar Hussain (1852 –1857)
- Born: 22 May 1839; Sabli, Dungarpur, Rajputana, British Raj
- Died: 13 February 1898; Dungarpur, Rajputana, British Raj
- Spouse: HH Maharaniji Sa Devadiji (Chauhanji) Umaid Kanwarji of Sirohi State; HH Maharaniji Sa Chauhanji Shiv Kanwarji of Motagaon in Banswara State
- Issue: Yuvraj Khuman Singh; Baiji Lal Shringar Kanwarji m.to HH Maharawal Sir Bairi Sal of Jaisalmer State
- House: Dungarpur
- Dynasty: Guhilot
- Father: Dalpat Singh (adoptive); Rajvi Jaswant Singh of Sabli in Dungarpur (biological)

HH Rai-Raian Mahi-Mahendra Shri Ravi Kul Bhushan Maharawal Sir Udai Singh II was the Ahar Guhilot ruler of Dungarpur State from the year 1844 to 1898.

== Birth ==
He was born on 22 May 1839 to Maharaj Jaswant Singh of Sabli.

== Succession ==
After the death of Maharawat Savant Singh of Pratapgarh, his grandson Dalpat Singh, who had been adopted into the royal family of Dungarpur and served as regent there following the deposition of Jaswant Singh II from 1825 to 1844, returned to Pratapgarh and ascended the throne. This raised the question of whether it would be in the best interests of both Dungarpur and Pratapgarh to unite under a single ruler. However, it was deemed unsuitable by both the Government of India at the time and the nobles of Dungarpur. Seeing all this, the deposed Jaswant Singh tried to adopt Mohkam Singh, but the nobles of the state intervened, prevented him from doing so, and compelled him to go to Mathura. Eventually, Dalpat Singh was granted permission to adopt a successor to the throne of Dungarpur, and Udai Singh was selected.

It is said that when the selection committee, which was to choose the successor to the throne, came to Sabli, they distributed sweets among its Thakur's four sons. Three of them put out their open hands to accept them, but the fourth one, Udai, refused to take them unless they were given to him in a dish. Next, the committee distributed some money among them. All of them pocketed it except for Udai, who distributed a portion of it among some poor boys, gave some to Brahmins, and from the remaining amount, bought himself a pistol, dagger, and clothes. This impressed the members of the selection committee, and they immediately chose him as the next Maharawal.

Dalpat Singh was unwilling to leave the throne of Dungarpur, so a force of 400, commanded by Abhai Singh and Arjun Singh, went to Pratapgarh to settle the matter by force. This all took Dalpat by surprise; therefore, he thought it best to resolve the conflict with diplomacy. He took Udai in his lap and proclaimed him as his adopted son and successor to the throne of Dungarpur. Upon this, the party returned to Dungarpur and installed Udai Singh on the throne.

== Minority ==
=== First regent: 1844 – 1852 ===
Udai was only seven years old when he was crowned Maharawal in 1844. As he was a minor, his adoptive father, Dalpat Singh, was appointed regent. During his regency, he oversaw affairs in Dungarpur from Pratapgarh, which caused things to worsen and disorder to take over. This continued for eight years until, in 1852, the regency was taken from him.

=== Second regent: 1852 – 1857 ===
When the regency was taken from Dalpat Singh, the Government of India at the time appointed Munshi Safdar Hussain as the regent. He continued the administration of the state until Udai came of age in 1857. He proved to be a capable administrator, improved state revenue, and kept both the nobles of the state and the Bhils in check. During his regency, Abhai Singh and Arjun Singh became unmanageable, wanted to do everything their way, and had no respect for the Maharawal as they thought they had brought him to the throne. To bring them to reason, he had Abhai Singh's estate confiscated. Seeing this, Arjun Singh came to reason.

== Reign ==
The long minority ended in 1857 when he was granted full administrative powers. Shortly after, the Indian Rebellion of 1857 started. During the uprising, he assisted the British Government and Capt. Brooke in suppressing it, both personally and by providing troops, and offered shelter to European refugees. He stayed with his army in Kherwara for six months and stopped a mutiny among the troops in that cantonment. For his services, in 1862, he was given a sanad that granted him the right of adoption. He was also gifted two cannons, which he did not accept as a free gift but instead paid for them. His early rule was generally marked by constant disputes between him and the nobles of his state, who had both civil and criminal powers within their estates. As the powers his nobles had were the cause of his troubles, he stripped them of all civil and criminal powers and became the absolute ruler of his state, as all powers were now vested in him. During the Rajputana famine of 1869, he handled it well by providing generous and careful relief efforts to relieve his suffering subjects. The measures he took were described as humane and judicious. He established regular courts, founded a hospital, and opened schools. He built Udai Bilas Palace on the shores of Gaib Sagar lake at a cost of over a lakh of rupees.

== Personal life ==
He was married in 1855 to the daughter of the Maharao of Sirohi and had issue, a son, Khuman Singh.

== Death ==
He died in February 1898 and was succeeded by his grandson, Vijay Singh, as Maharawal of Dungarpur.
