= Udai Bilas Palace =

Palace in Dungarpur, India

Coordinates: 23.8376°N 73.7228°E

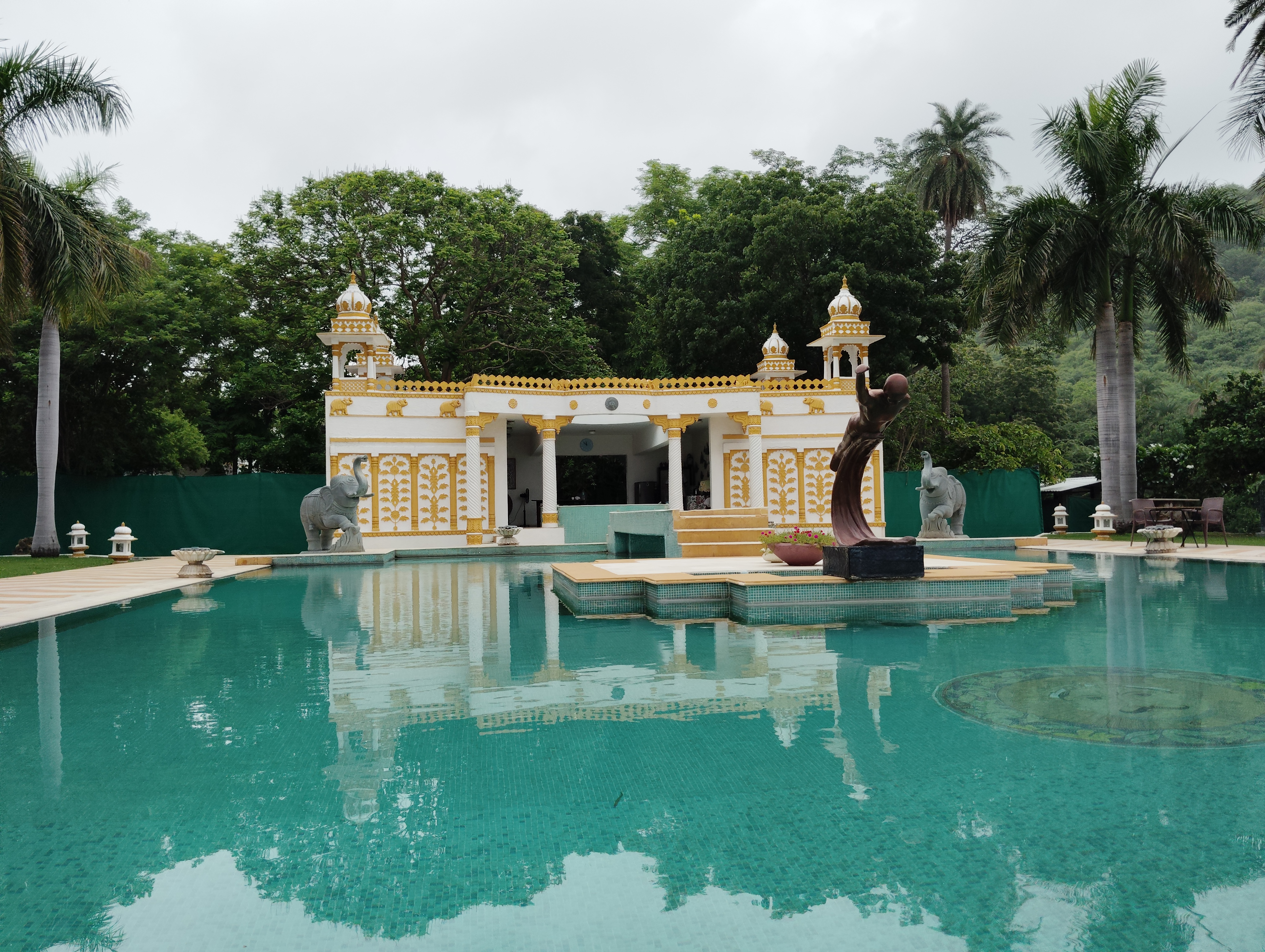

General information
- Architectural style: Rajput architecture
- Town or city: Dungarpur
- Country: India
- Owner: Harshvardhan Singh

Website
- https://udaibilaspalace.com

Udai Bilas Palace in Dungarpur, Rajasthan is the principal residence of the former royal family of Dungarpur and operates as a heritage hotel. A part of the palace is a museum.

== History ==
It was constructed in the mid-19th century by Maharawal Udai Singh II, after whom it is named. It was built at a cost of over a lakh of rupees. It was later expanded by his descendants. Three new wings were added between 1940 and 1944. It was originally a weekend retreat for the royal family from the 13th-century Juna Mahal. Previously, the family resided at Juna Mahal; however, they relocated here in the mid-20th century.

During the princely era, a force numbering between 59 and 101 over the years was employed to mount guard at the Udai Bilas and the old palaces. It also provided escorts to the Maharawal and Maharani.

== Architecture ==
It is built in the classic Rajput architectural style. The structure features intricate designs on its balconies, arches, and windows. It is located next to Gaib Sagar Lake. One of its wings, built using the local bluish-grey stone known as pareva, overlooks the lake. The palace is divided into three sections: Raniwas, Udai Bilas, and Ek Thambiya Mahal.

== Interior ==
Its interior features a fusion of Indian and European styles. Its rooms have British floral wallpapers and art deco furniture. The rooms feature decorative mirrorwork and stained glass. African room at the palace houses one of the best collections of hunting trophies in the world.

== Structures within the complex ==
=== Ek Thambiya Mahal ===
Ek Thambiya Mahal (meaning: single-pillared palace), also known as Krishna Prakash, was built by Maharawal Shiv Singh between 1730 and 1785 in memory of Gyan Kanwar as Shivjaneshwar Shivalay. It features intricately sculpted pillars and panels, ornate balconies, balustrades, bracketed windows, arches, and a frieze of marble carvings.

=== Shiva Rajeshwar temple ===
Maharawal Shiv Singh constructed a temple dedicated to Shiva Rajeshwar at the southeastern edge of Gaib Sagar Lake. Now located within the Udai Bilas precincts, this temple once hosted an annual month-long fair.

=== Dungarpur Mews ===
The palace also houses a museum featuring classic and vintage cars, known as Dungarpur Mews. It also has a car bar.

=== Maharani Manhar Kumari Museum ===
The palace also houses a museum named after Manhar Kumari, the daughter of Madan Singh, Maharaja of Kishangarh, and his wife Ankaran Bai, who was the daughter of Fateh Singh, Maharana of Udaipur. Manhar Kumari was married to Laxman Singh, the Maharawal of Dungarpur. It was opened to the public on 31 May 2015 by Mahipal Singh.

== Gallery ==
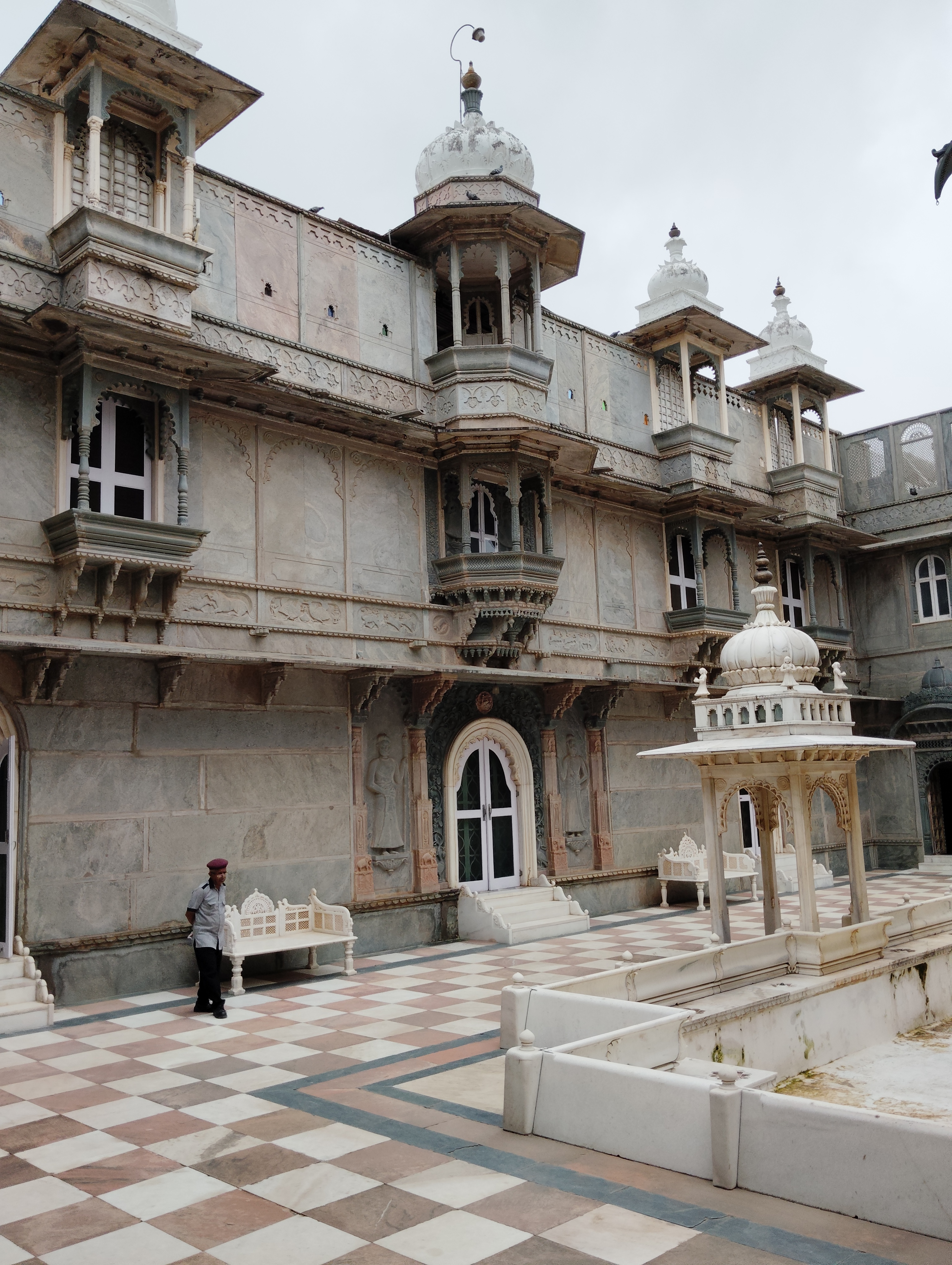
Courtyard where the Ek Thambiya Mahal is located.

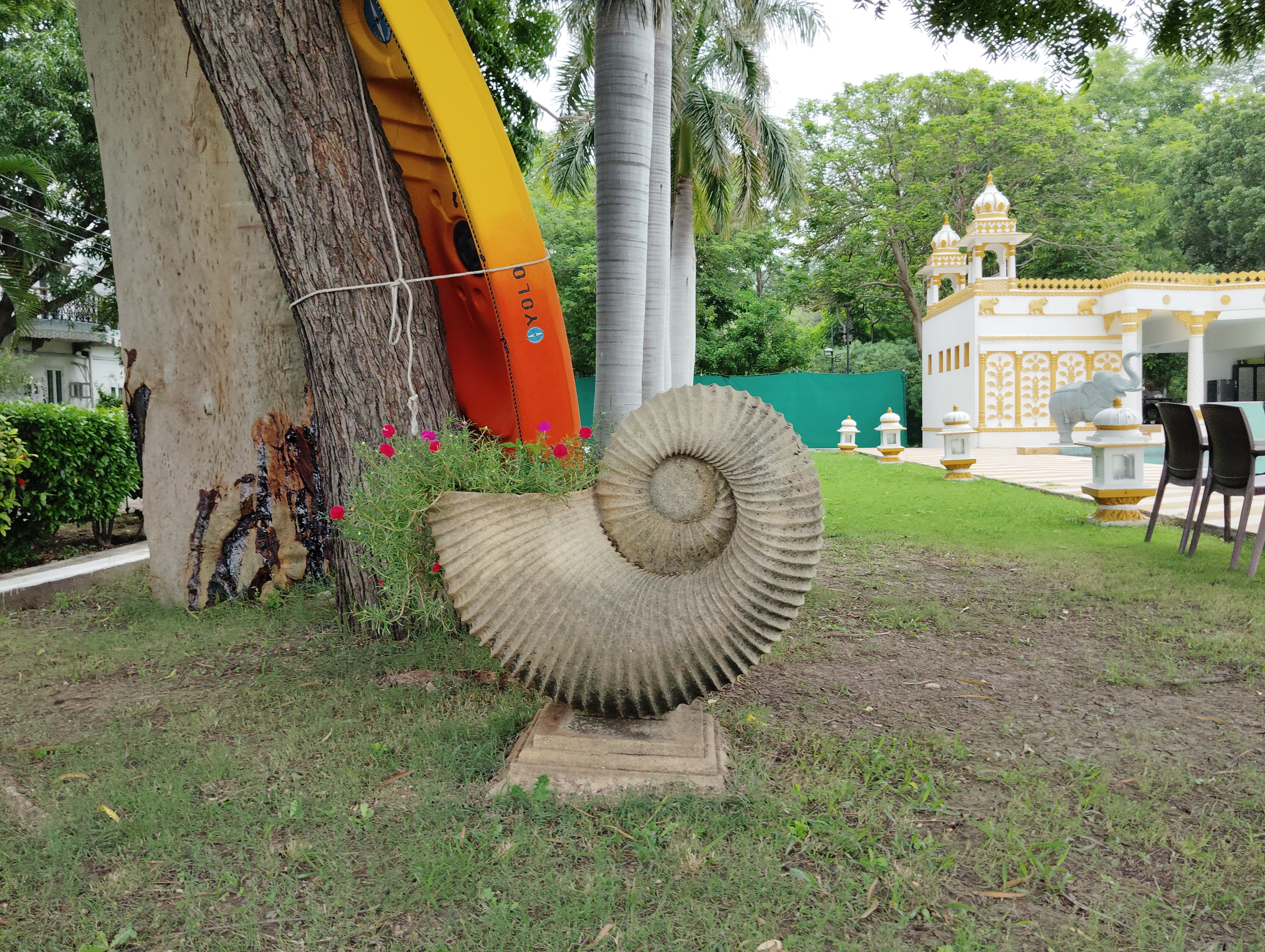

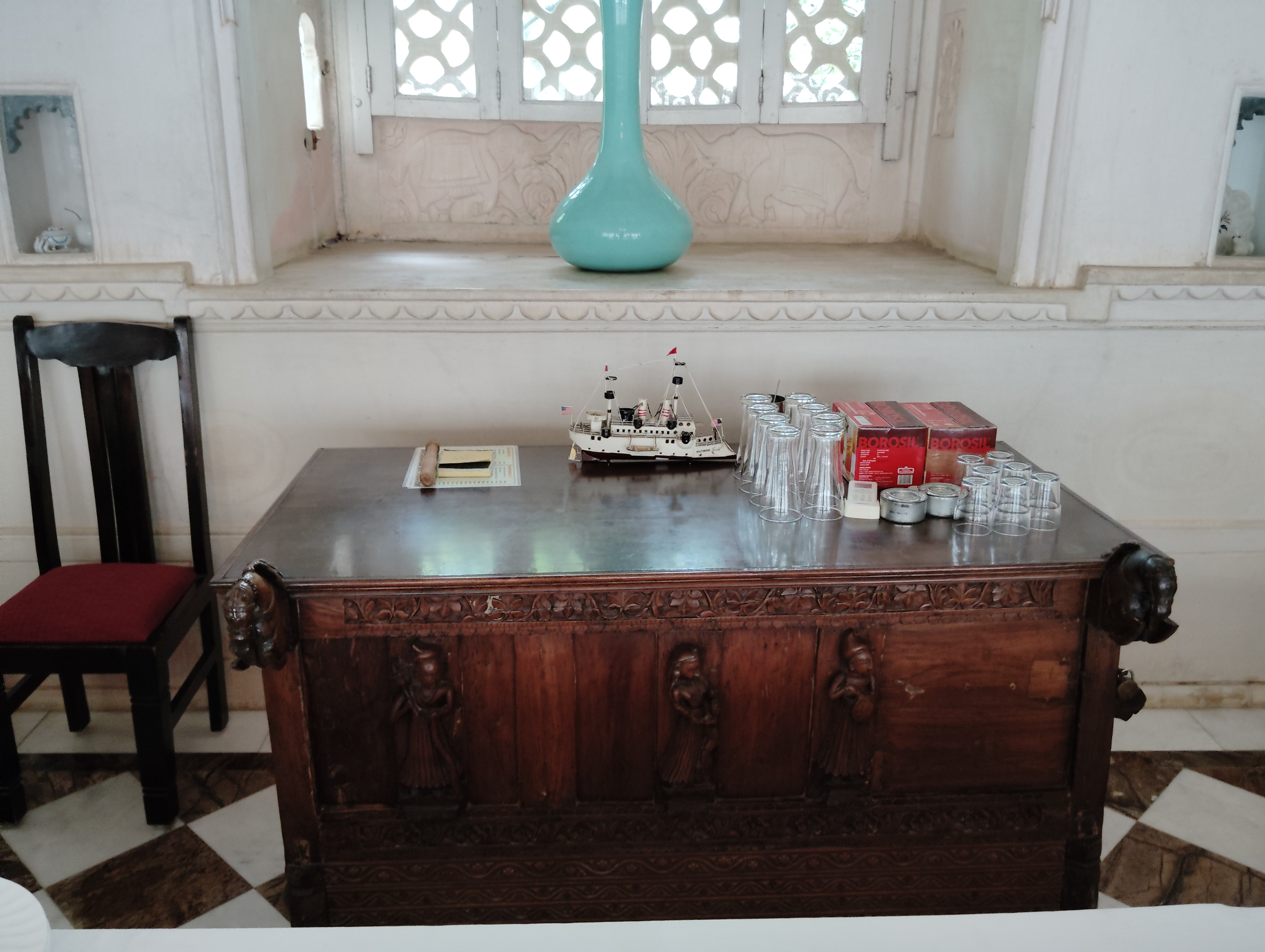

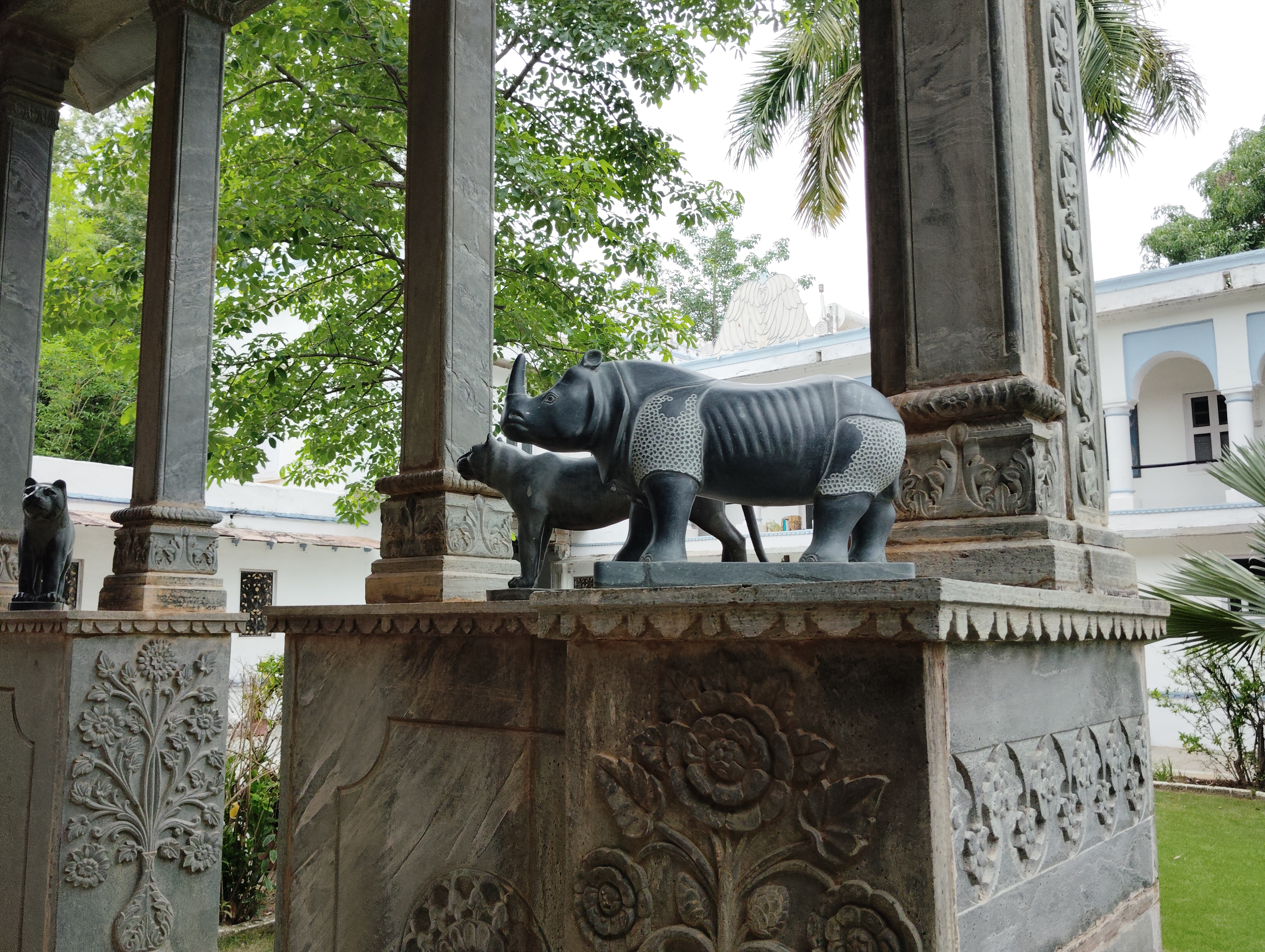

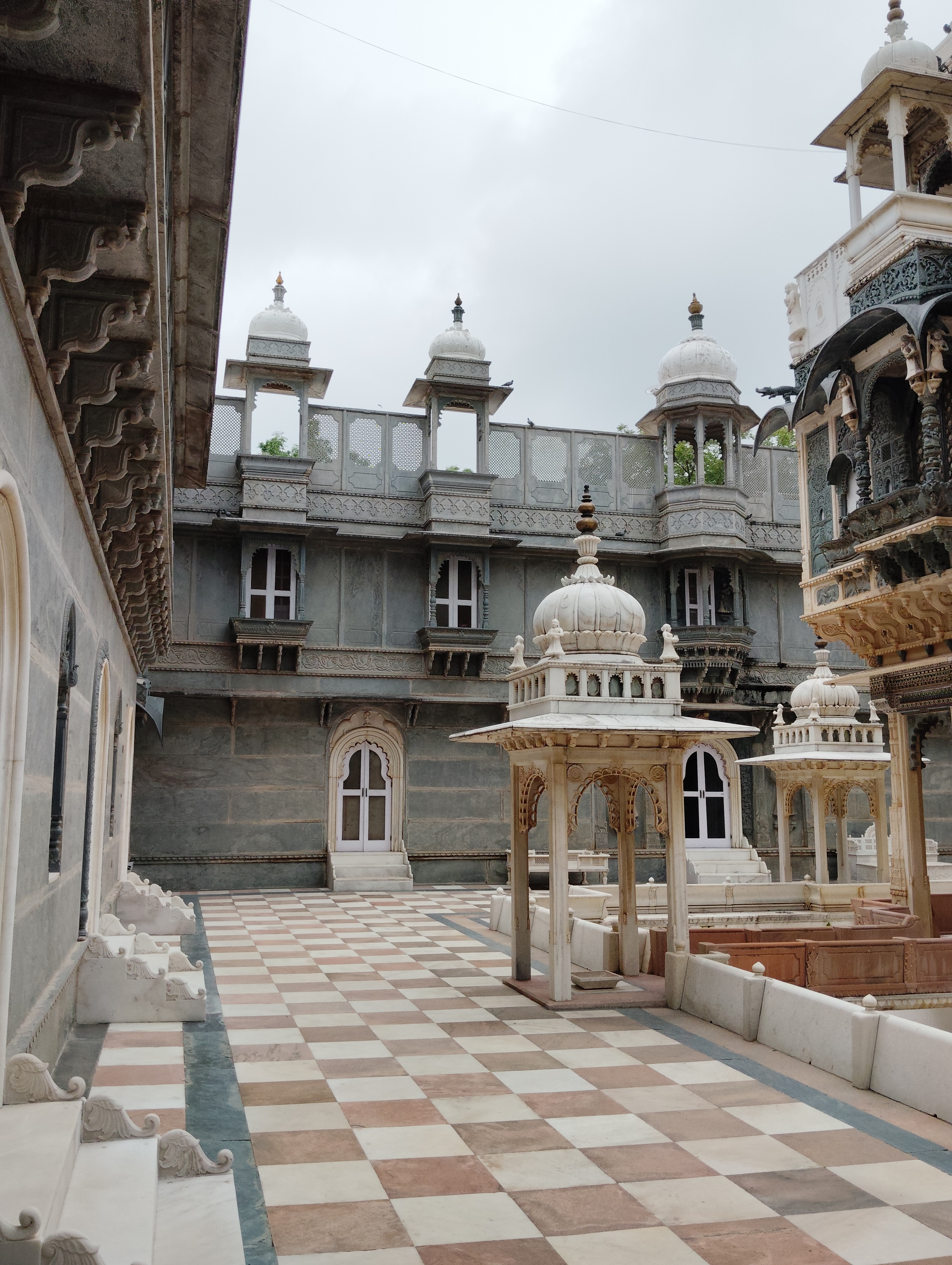
Courtyard where the Ek Thambiya Mahal is located.

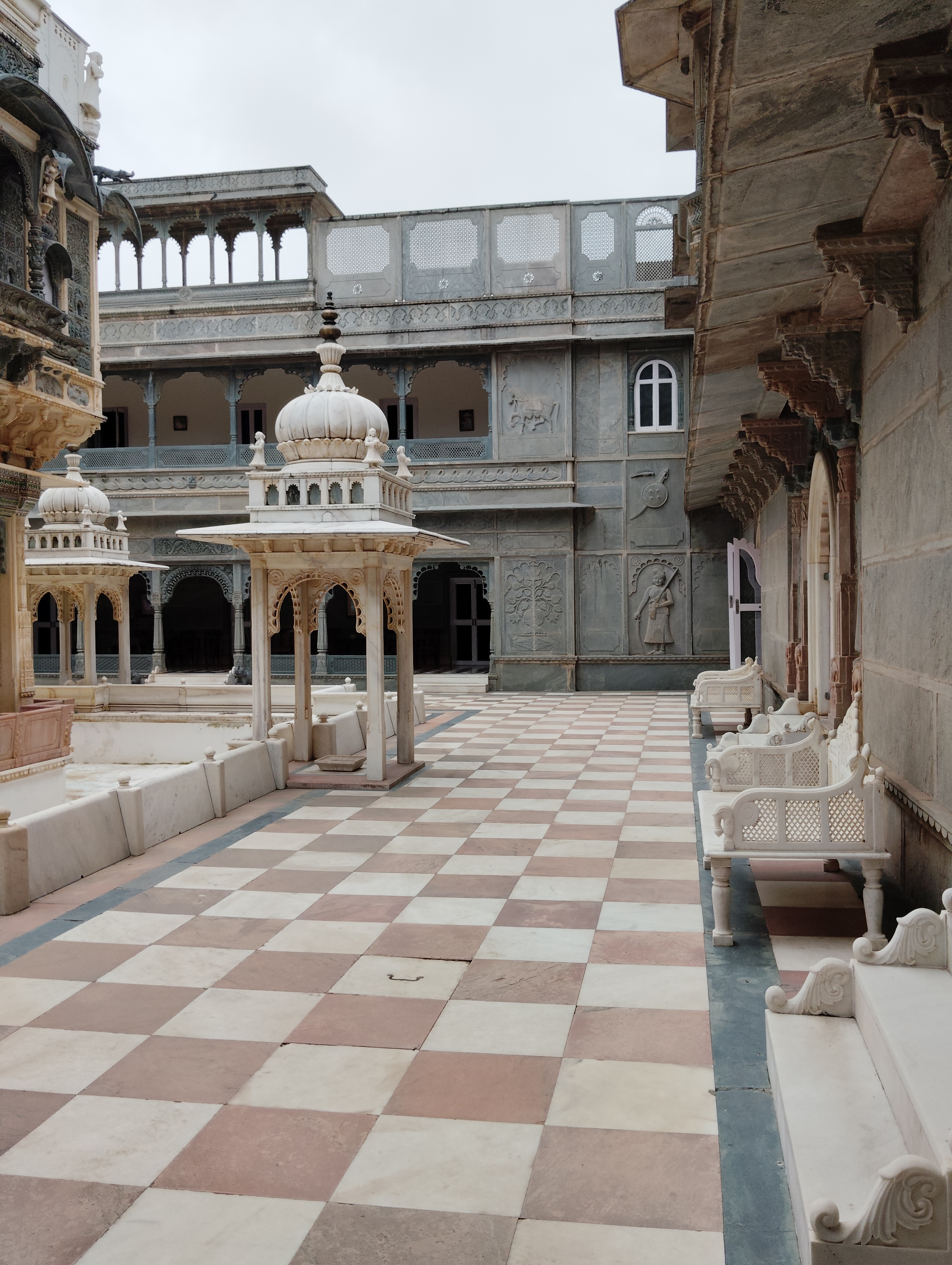
Courtyard where the Ek Thambiya Mahal is located.

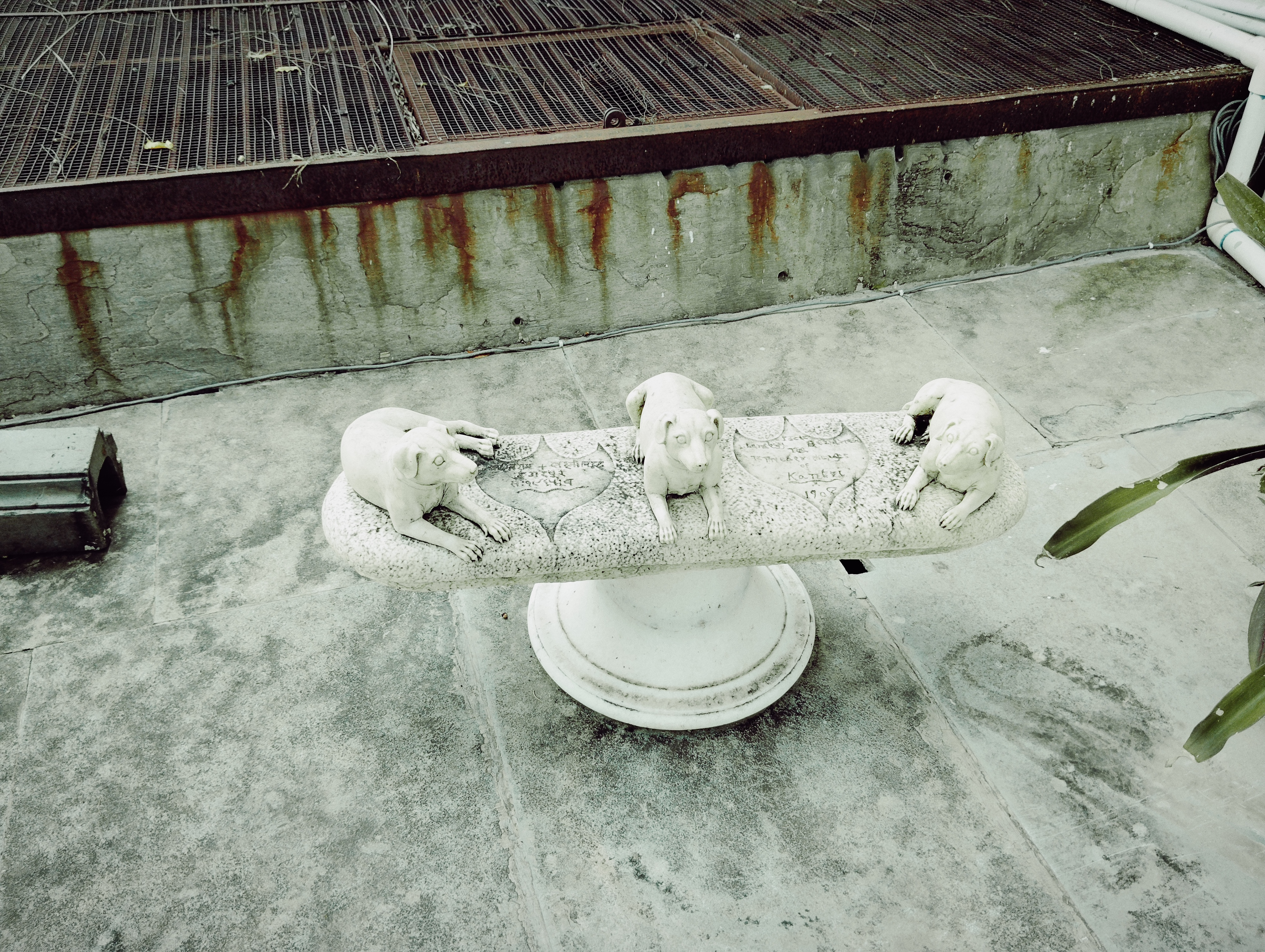

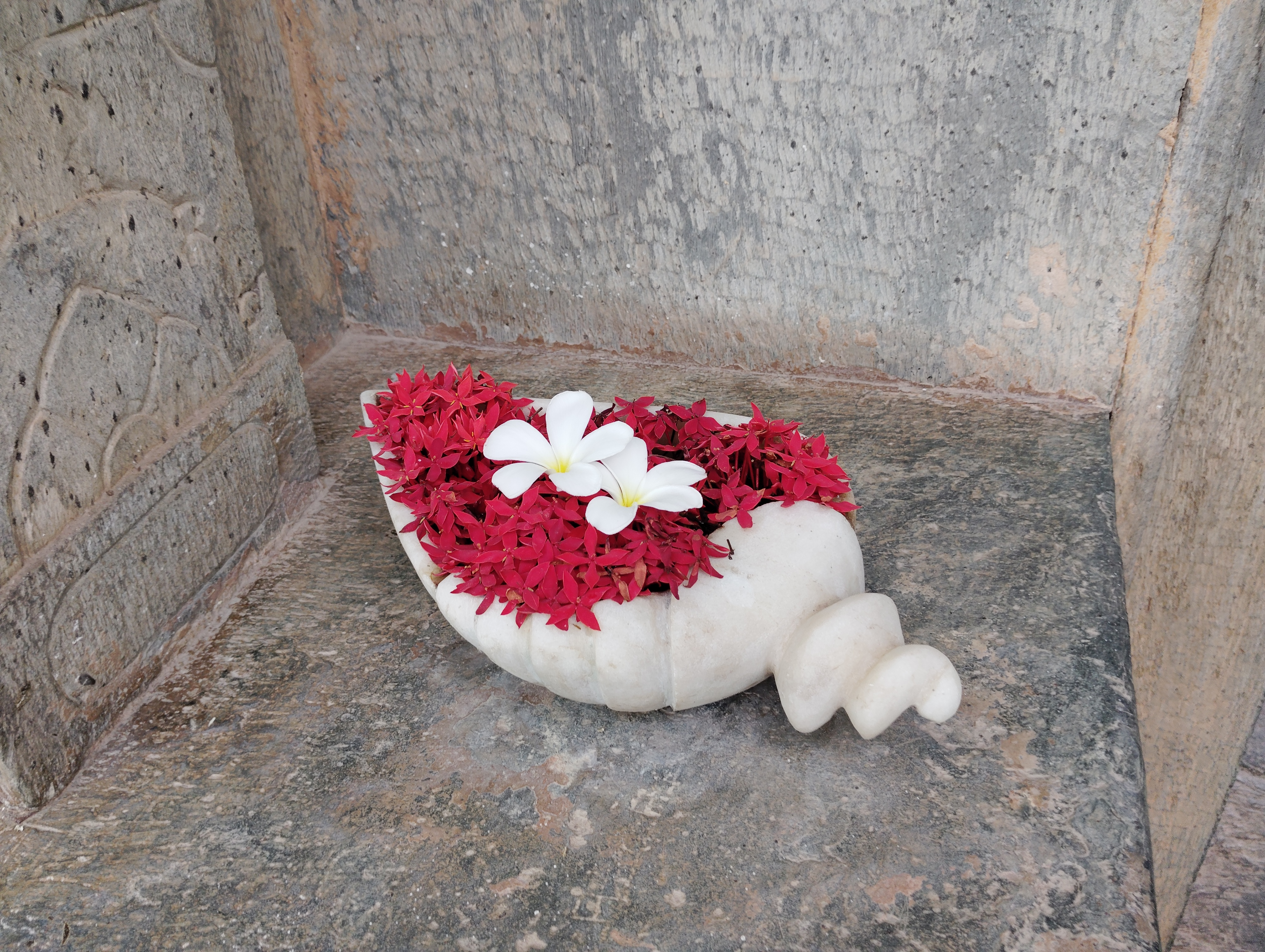

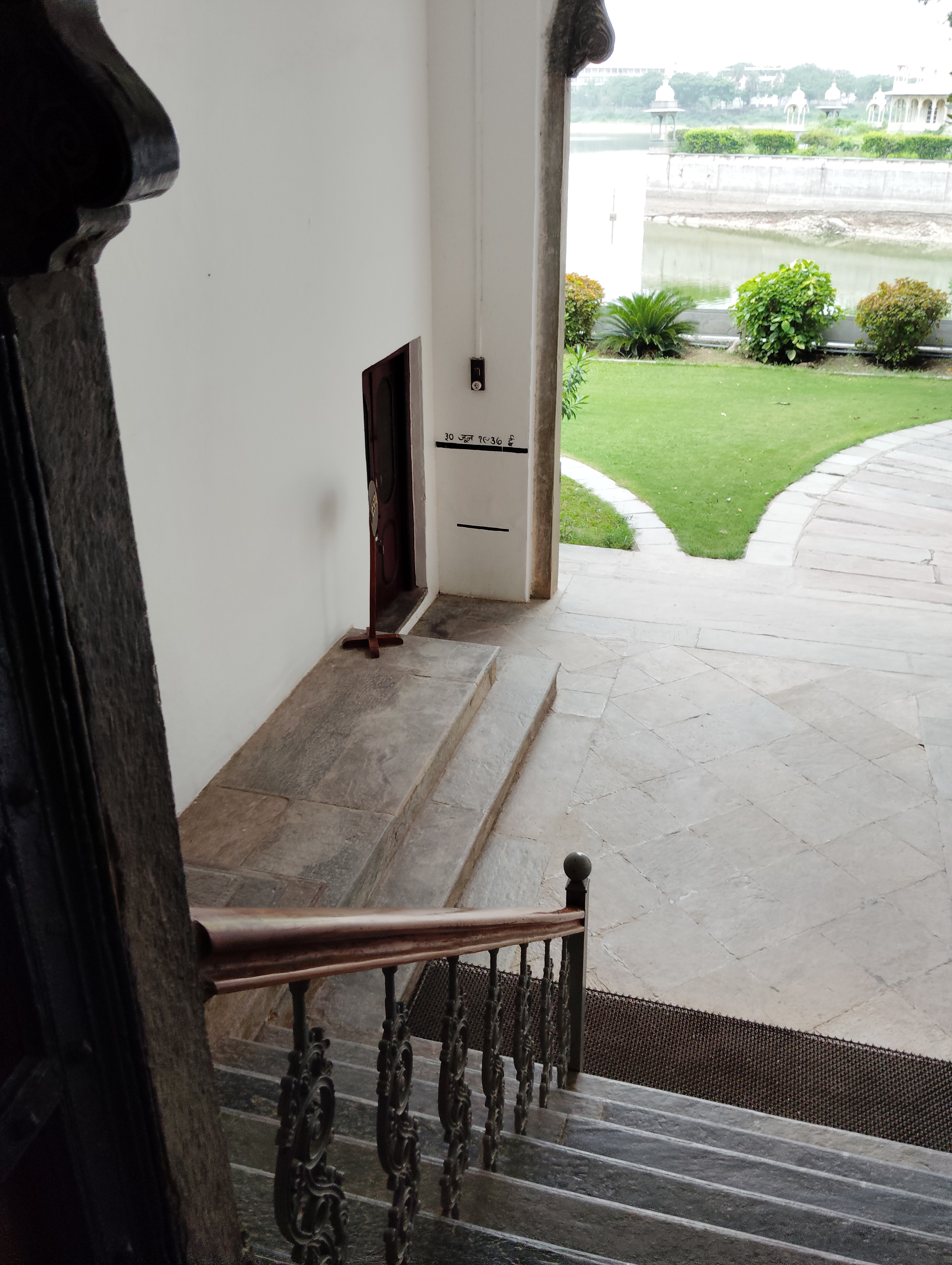

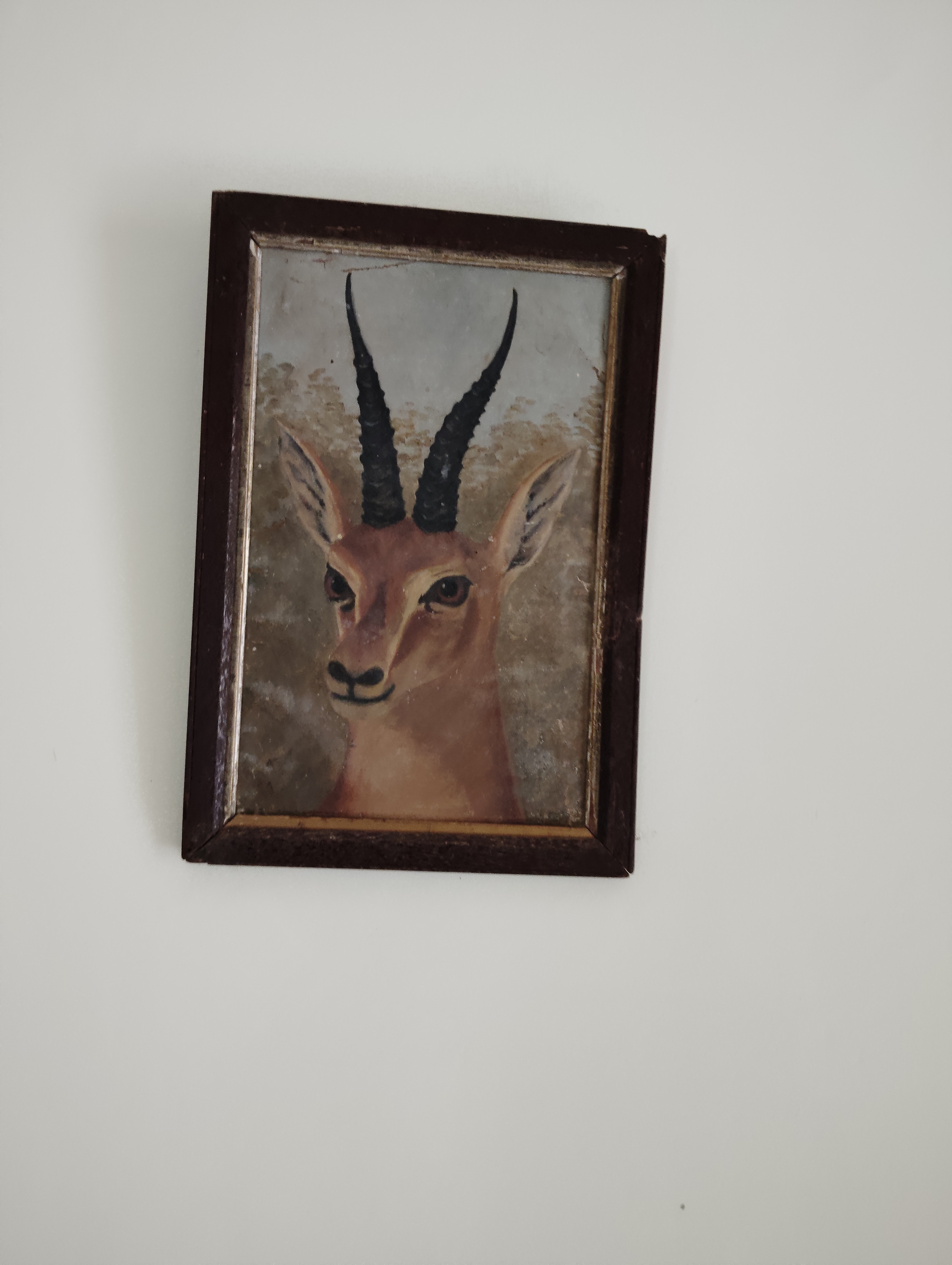

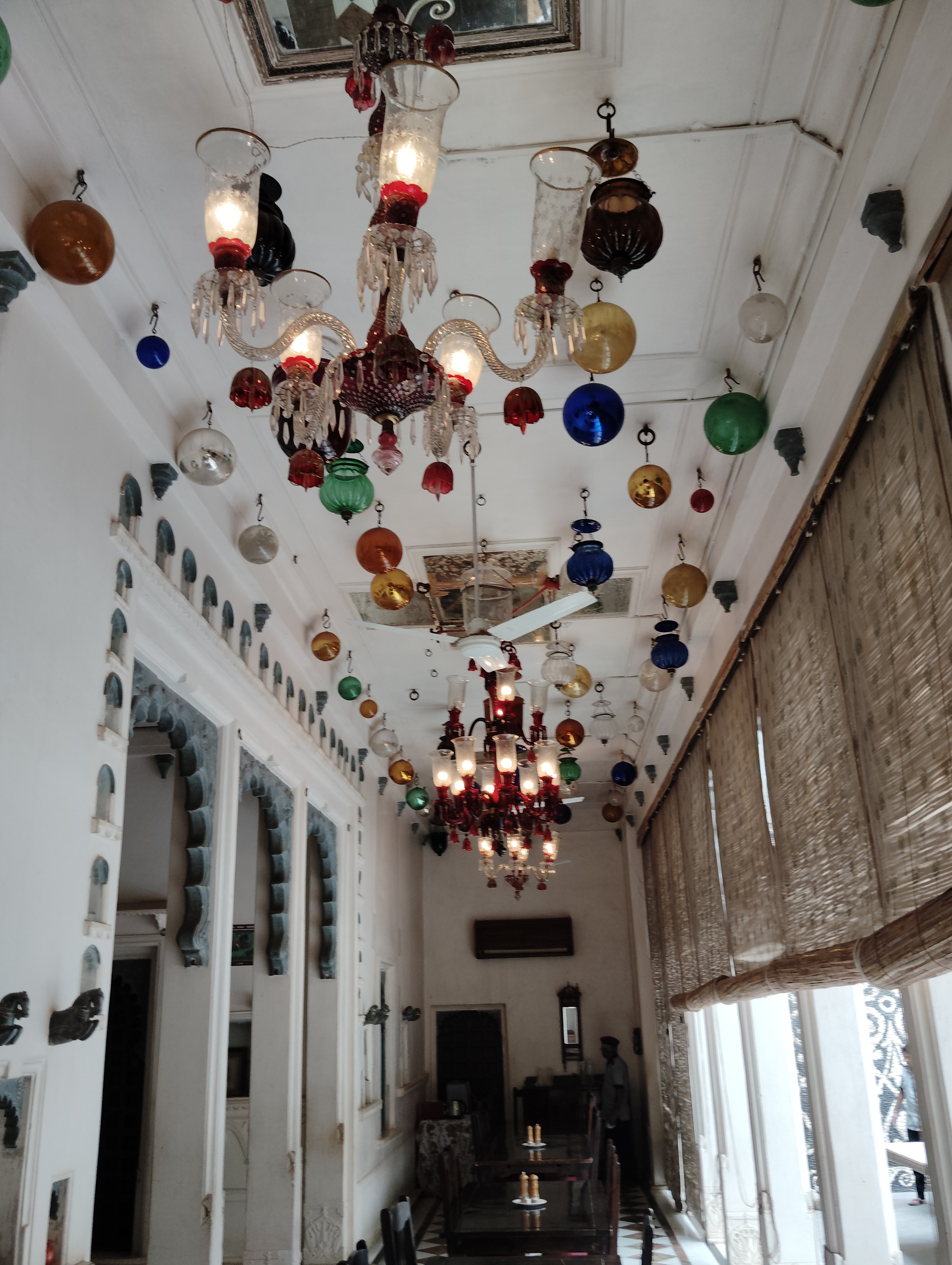

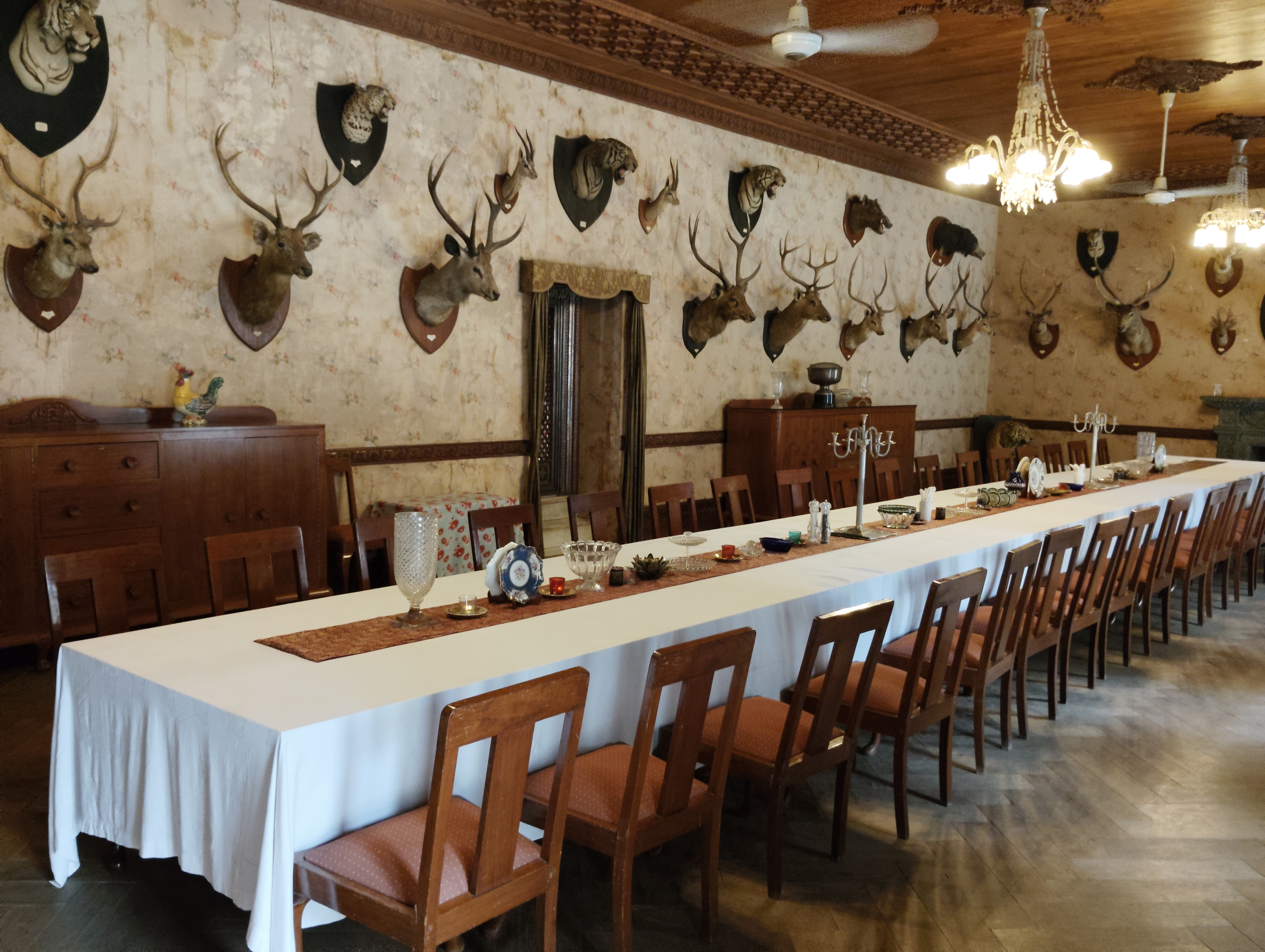
Dining room with hunting trophies lining the walls

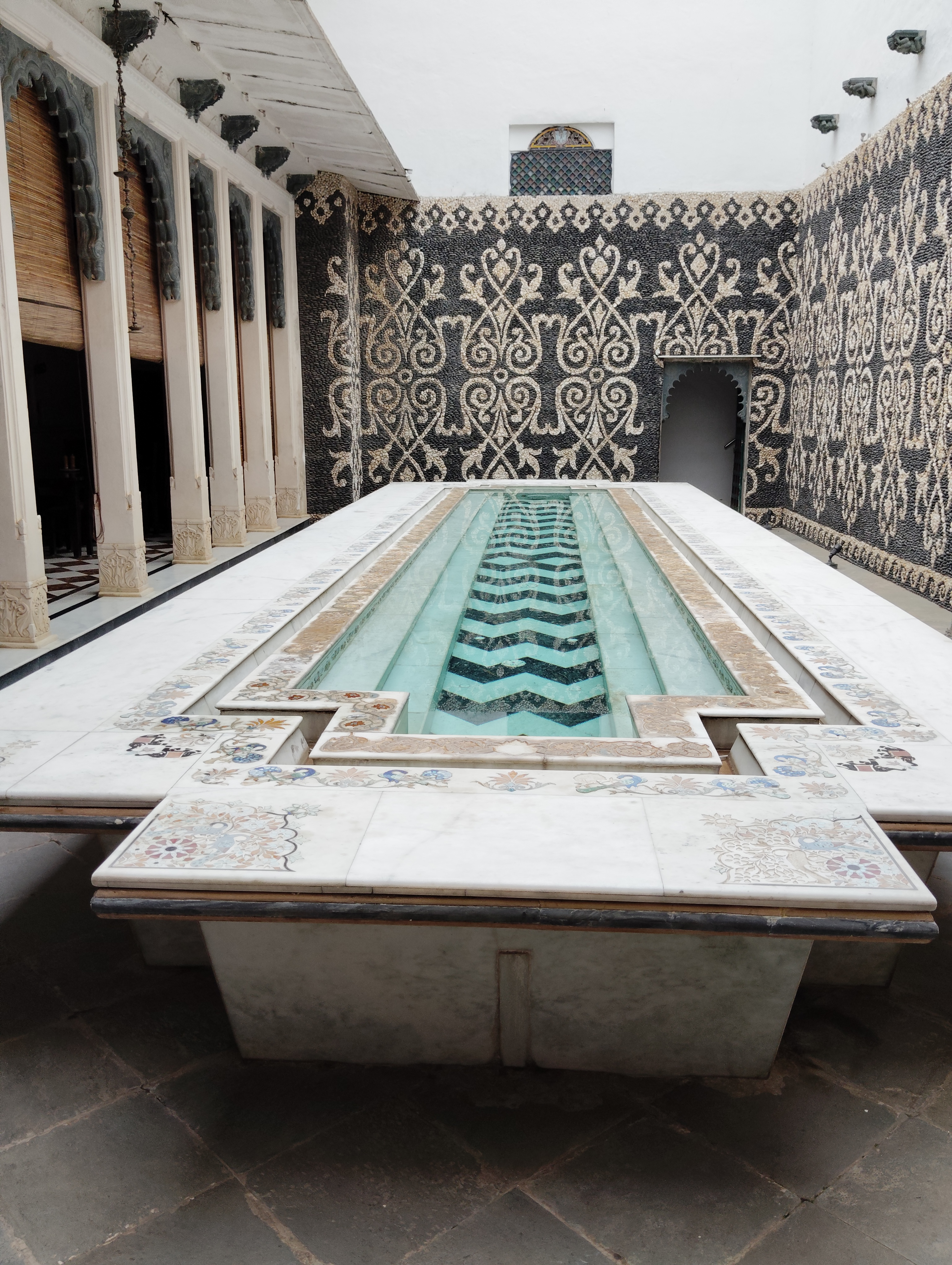
Marble inlay table with water pool down the center

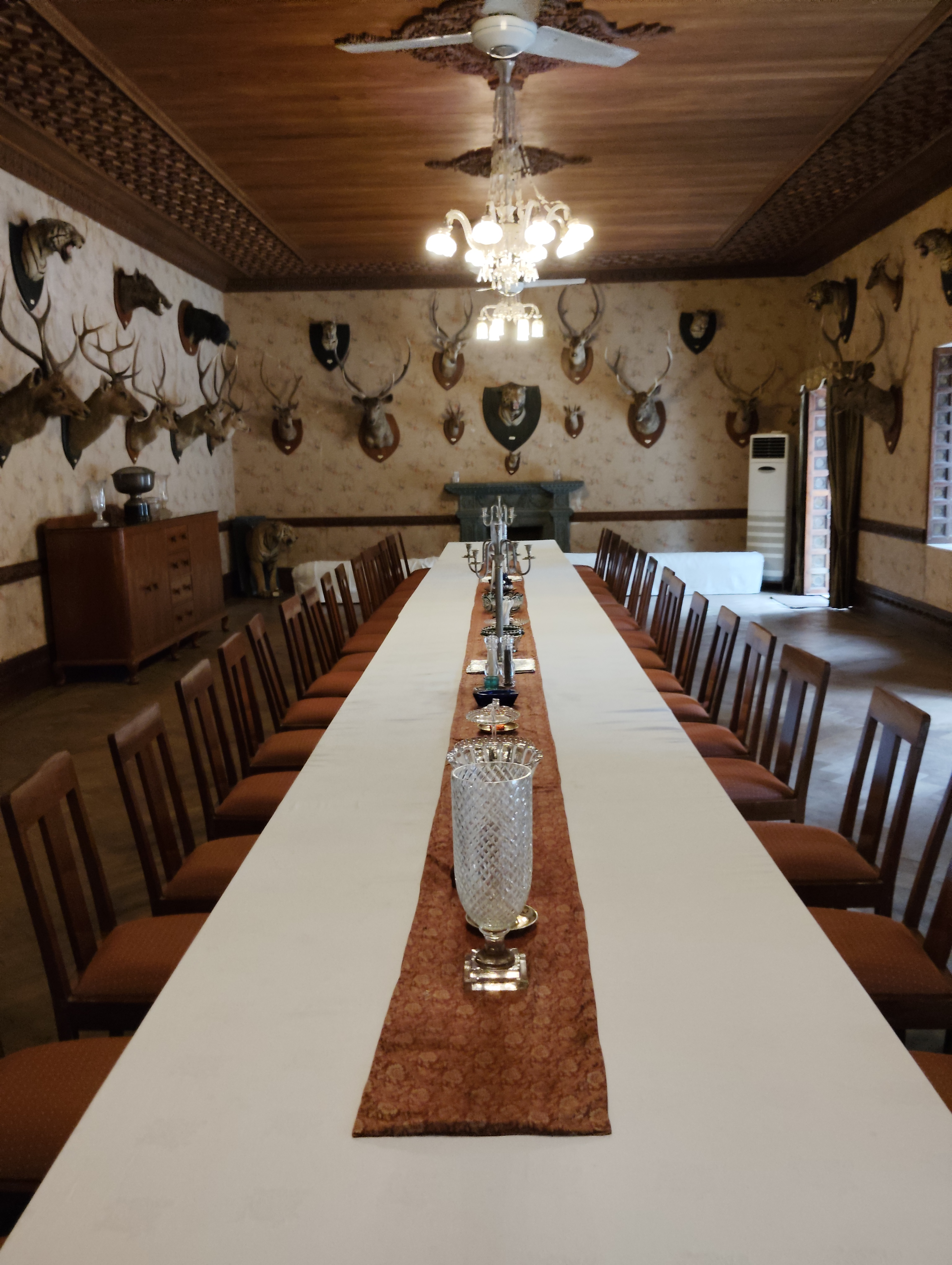
Dining room with hunting trophies lining the walls

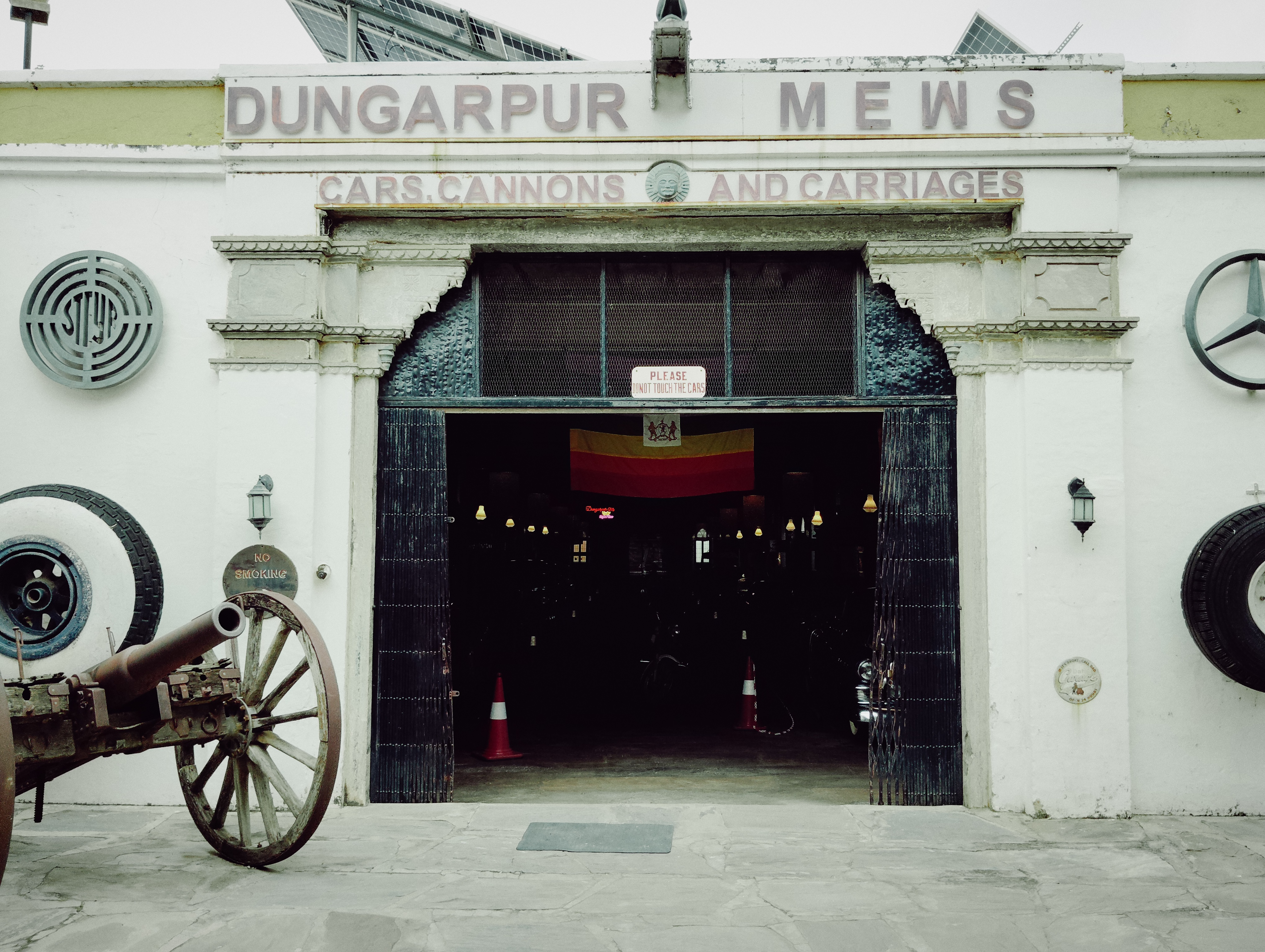
Dungarpur Mews in Udai Bilas Palace

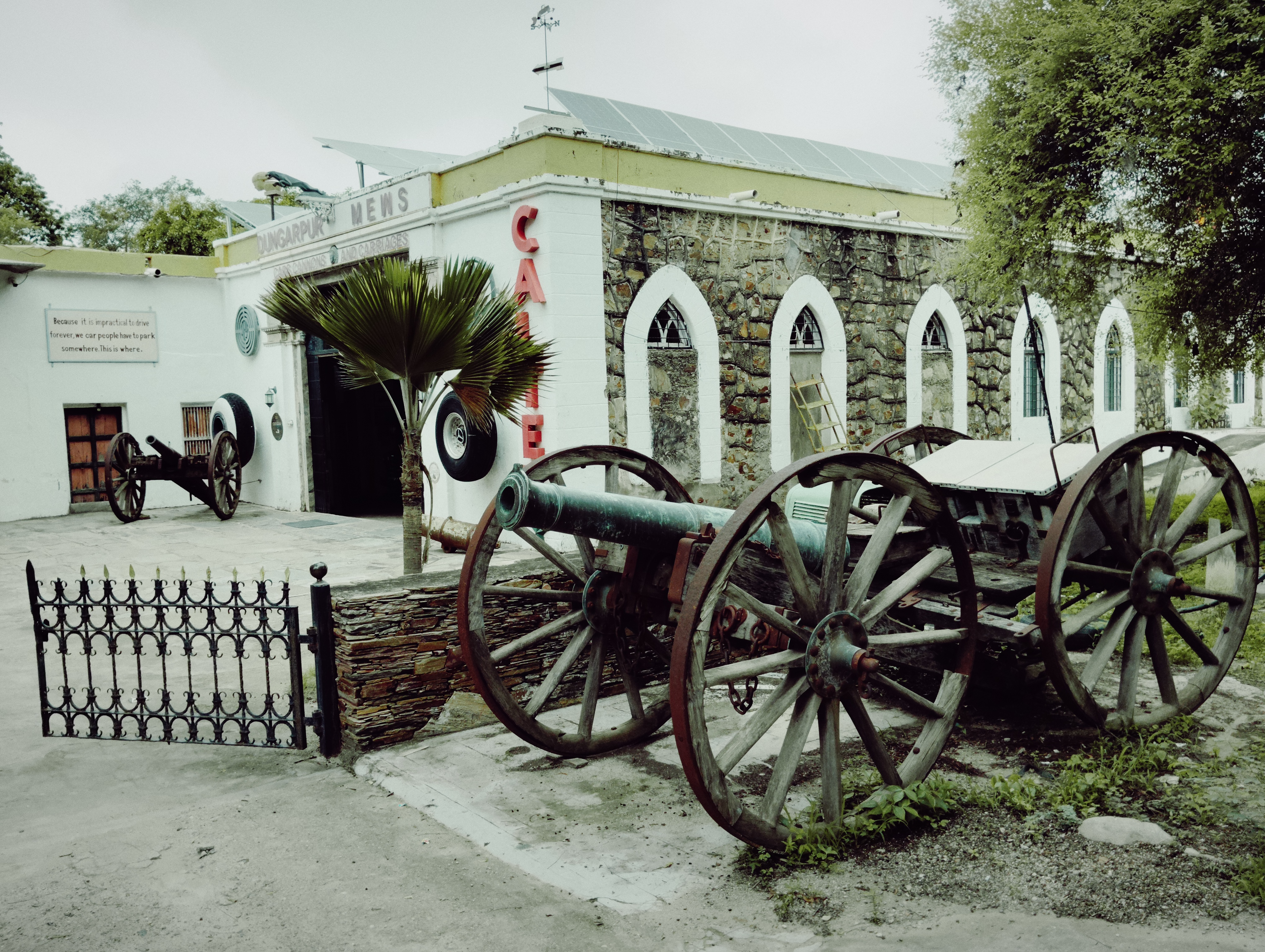
Dungarpur Mews in Udai Bilas Palace

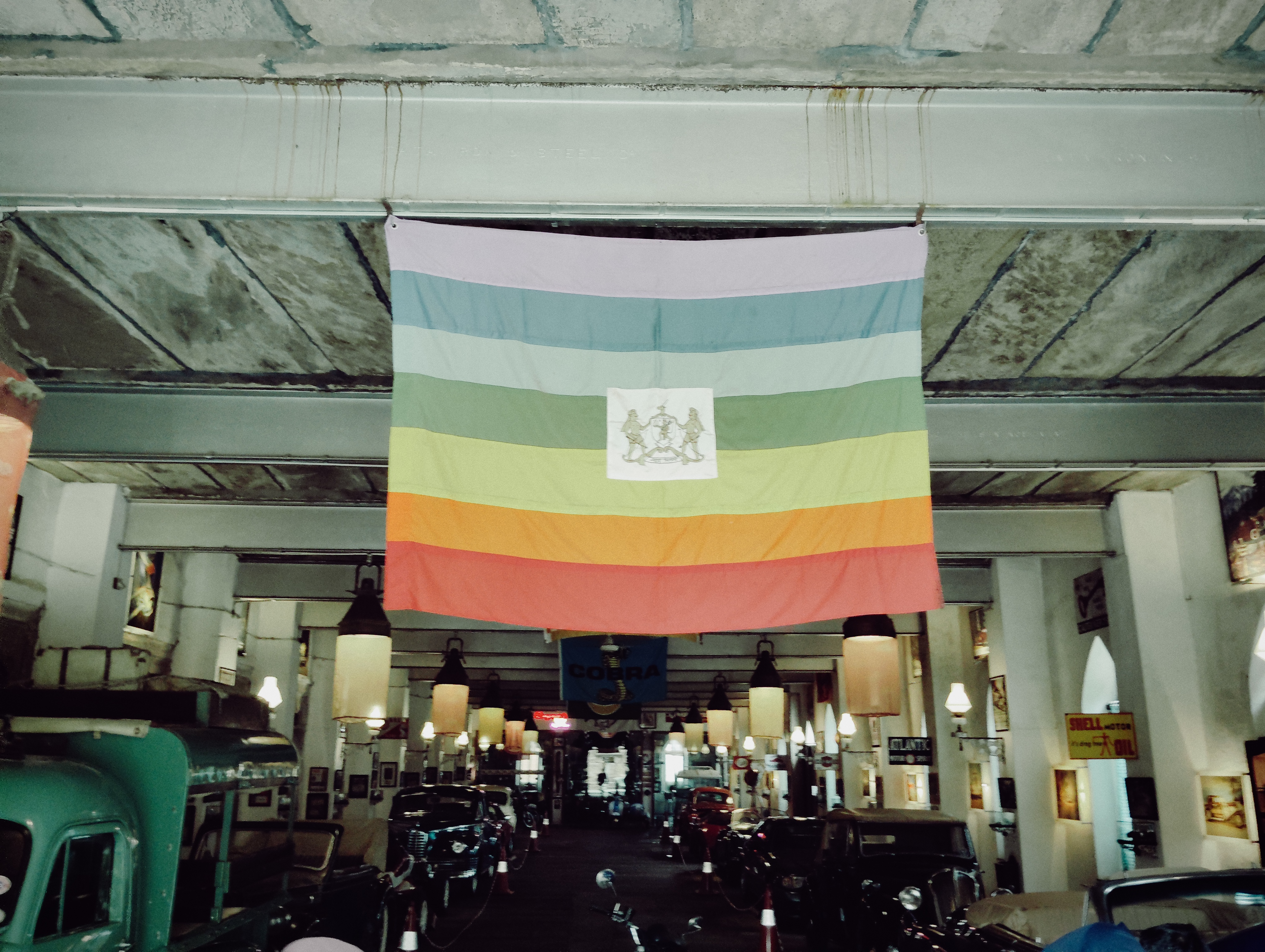
Dungarpur Mews in Udai Bilas Palace

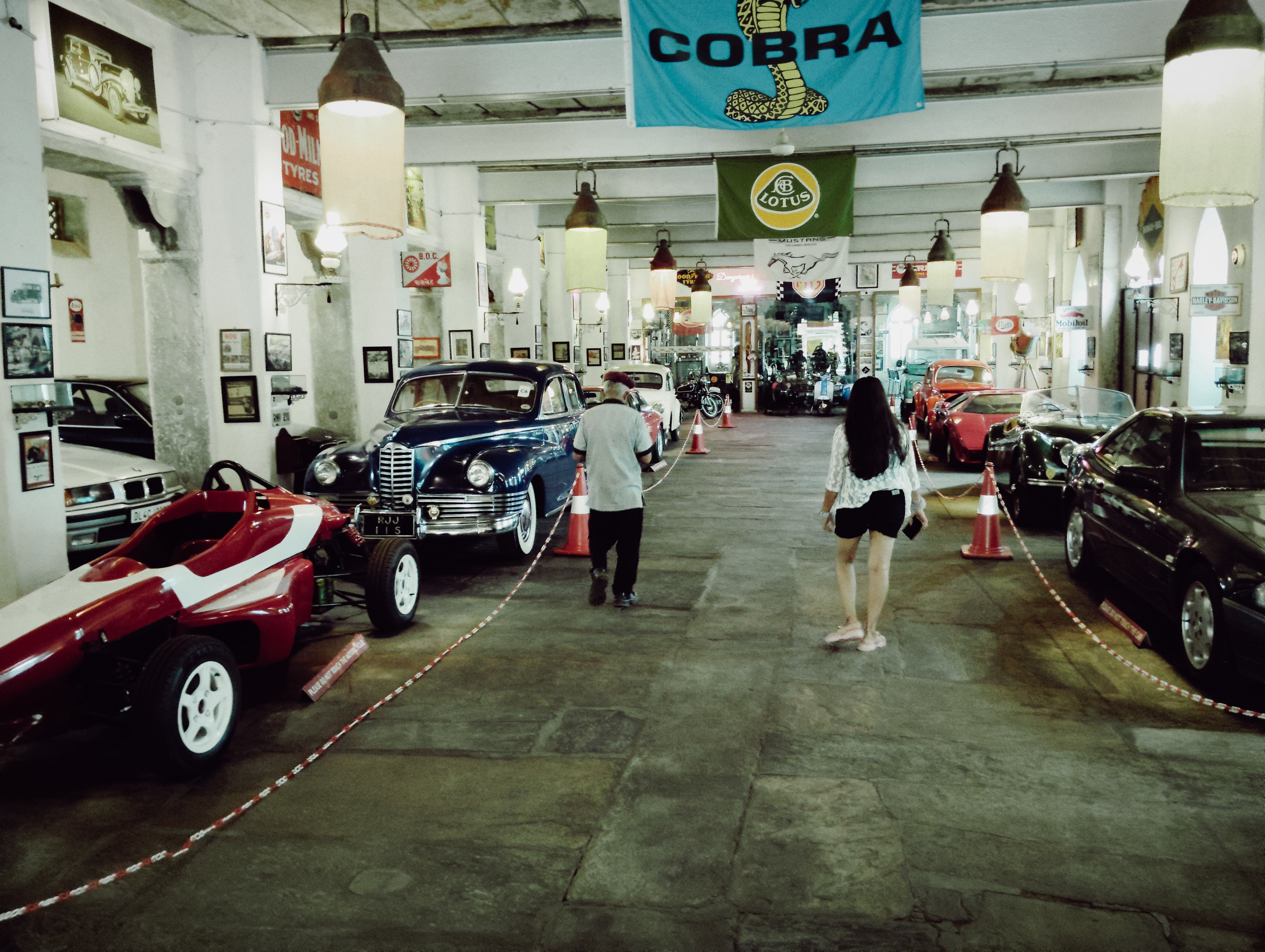
Dungarpur Mews in Udai Bilas Palace

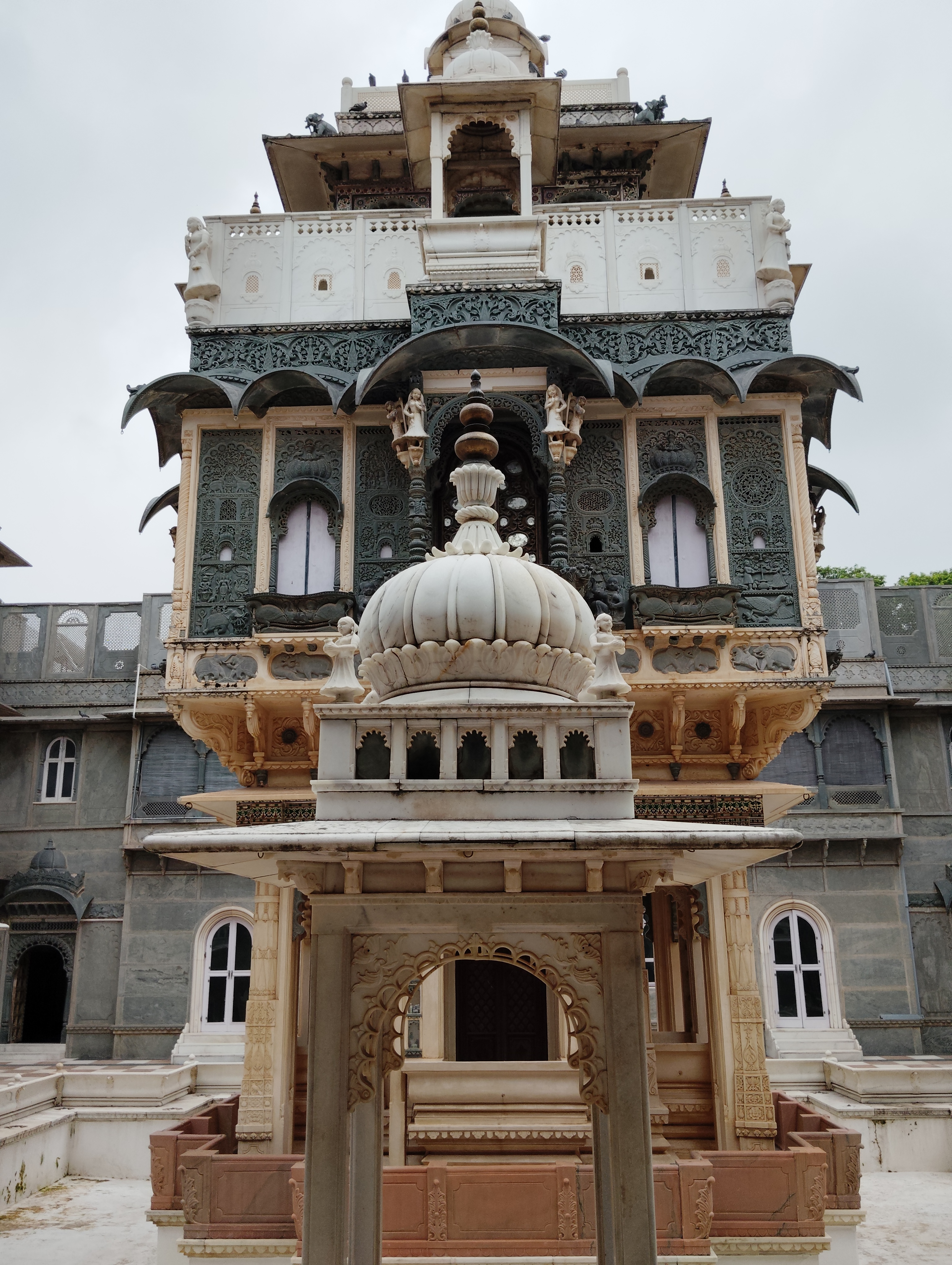
Ek Thambiya Mahal

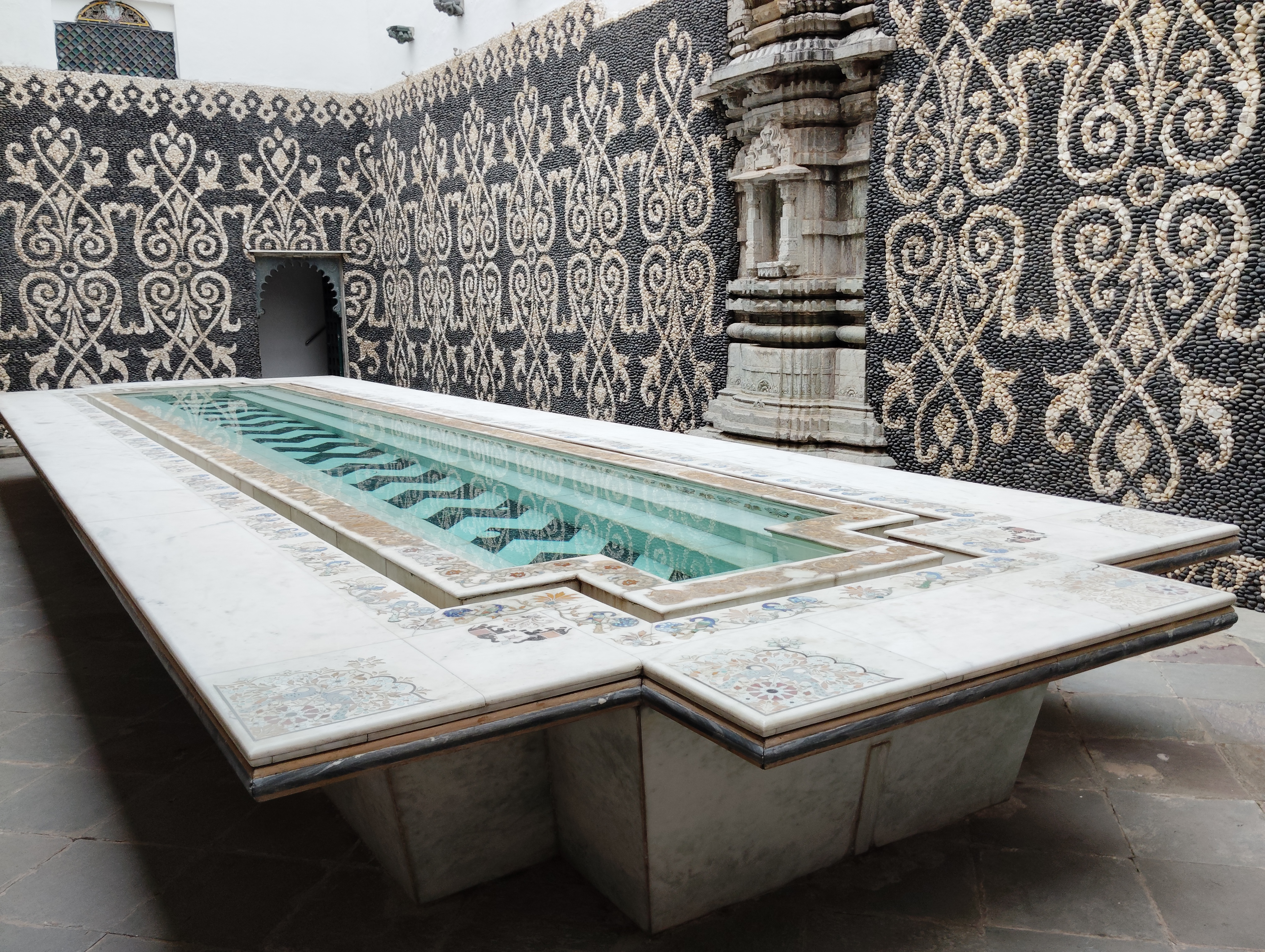
Courtyard where the Ek Thambiya Mahal is located.

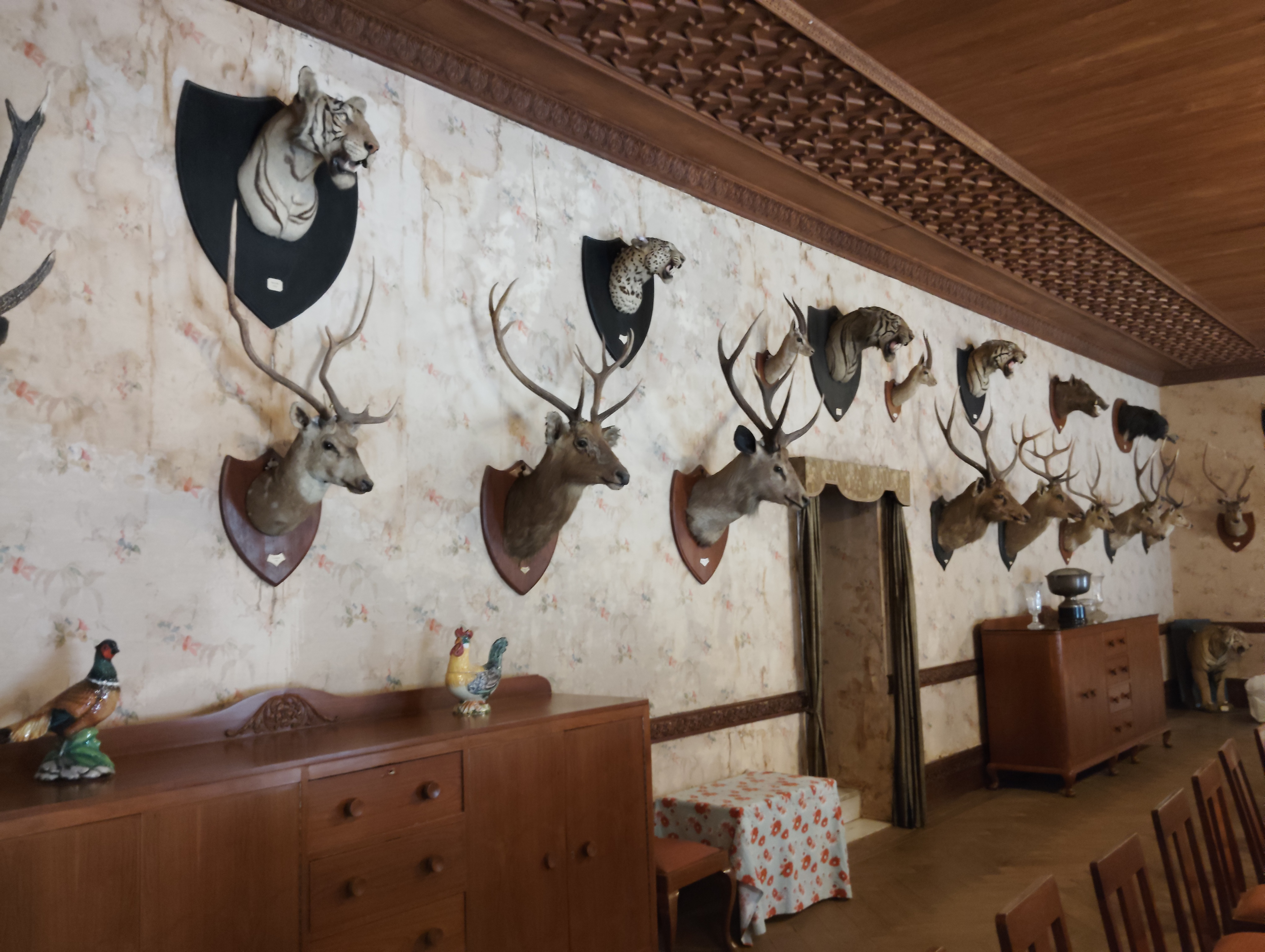
Hunting trophies lining the walls

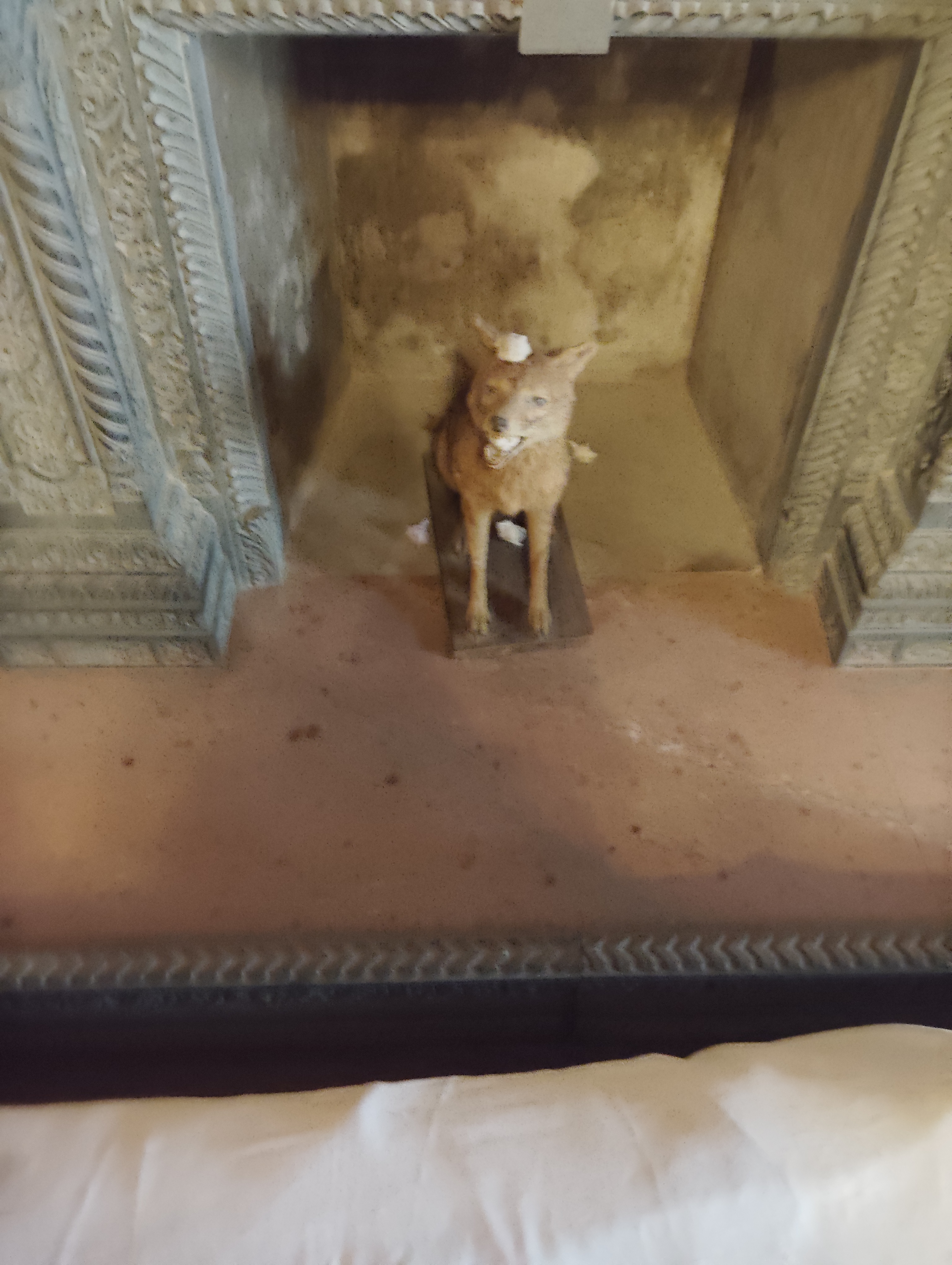
Hunting trophy at Udai Bilas
