= Dalpat Singh of Pratapgarh =

Regent of Dungarpur from 1825 to 1852 and Maharawat of Pratapgarh from 1844 to 1864

Dalpat Singh
- Maharawat

Maharawat of Pratapgarh
- Reign: 1844 – 1864
- Coronation: 5 January 1844
- Predecessor: Sawant Singh
- Successor: Udai Singh

Regent of Dungarpur
- Reign: 1825 – 1852
- Born: 26 November 1808
- Died: 30 March 1864 (aged 55)
- Spouse: Chauhanji Daulat Kanwarji of Namli in Ratlam; Rathoreji (Ramawat) Moti Kanwarji of Kushalgarh; Rathoreji (Ramawat) Kesar Kanwarji of Kushalgarh; Solankiniji Kalyan Kanwarji of Keranya in Bansda
- Issue: Udai Singh II (adoptive); Udai Singh (biological)
- House: Dungarpur (by adoption); Pratapgarh (by birth)
- Dynasty: Sisodia
- Father: Jaswant Singh II (adoptive); Dip Singh (biological)
- Mother: Rathoreji (Kishan-Singhot) d.of Rajvi Bhupal Singh of Fatehgarh in Kishangarh

Maharawat Dalpat Singh was regent of Dungarpur from 1825 to 1852 and the Sisodia Rajput ruler of Pratapgarh from the year 1844 until his death in 1864.

== Birth ==
Dalpat Singh was born as the second son of Dip Singh.

== Adoption ==
He was adopted into the royal family of Dungarpur by Jaswant Singh II.

== Regency ==
As Jaswant Singh II, his adoptive father, was an incapable and incompetent ruler, he was deposed in 1825. Dalpat was then appointed regent of Dungarpur by the Government of India despite the resentment and objections of the local nobles. His relations with the local nobles grew strained, as they viewed him as an outsider imposed upon them, particularly since an heir to the throne could have been adopted from an extended branch of the royal family of Dungarpur. By 1831, the tensions had escalated to the point that Dalpat had to seek aid from the Government to counter a planned insurrection. When he ascended the throne as Maharawat of Pratapgarh in 1844, following his biological grandfather Sawant Singh's death, this further worsened the already tense situation. The nobles of Dungarpur found it not only improper but also against Hindu law, according to which the adopted child severs all legal ties with the biological family and retains no rights to inherit from them. It also raised a series of questions, such as whether Pratapgarh and Dungarpur would be amalgamated into one, whether that would be beneficial for both states, or whether the doctrine of lapse would be applied, causing one of the states to escheat to the Government of India. Nobles of Dungarpur were against this amalgamation, and the Government of India decided that Dalpat Singh could not hold both states. Seeing what was happening in Dungarpur, its former Maharawal, Jaswant Singh II, attempted to adopt Mohkam Singh, son of Thakur Himmat Singh of Nandli, but the nobles of the state intervened and stopped him from doing so. Eventually, the Government of India permitted Dalpat Singh to adopt his successor to the throne of Dungarpur.

Nobles of Dungarpur selected seven-year-old Udai Singh, son of the Thakur of Sabli, as Dalpat's successor. Along with a force of 400 rajputs, they sent him to Pratapgarh, which took Dalpat by surprise. To avoid bloodshed, Dalpat took Udai in his lap and proclaimed him as his adopted son and successor to the throne of Dungarpur. Afterward, nobles brought Udai back to Dungarpur and installed him as Maharawal. During Udai's minority, Dalpat continued to be regent of Dungarpur from Pratapgarh, a position he held until 1852 when he was removed from the post.

== Reign ==
When his biological grandfather, Sawant Singh, died in 1844, leaving no one to succeed him as his son, Dip Singh, and his eldest grandson, Kesari Singh, had predeceased him, he was invited back to Pratapgarh to ascend the throne. During the Indian Rebellion of 1857, he sent his state forces to Neemuch to support the British troops.

== Death ==
He died in 1864 and was succeeded by his son Udai Singh as the Maharawat of Pratapgarh.
