= Sawant Singh =

Maharawat of Pratapgarh from 1775 to 1844

Maharawat Sawant Singh
- Maharawat
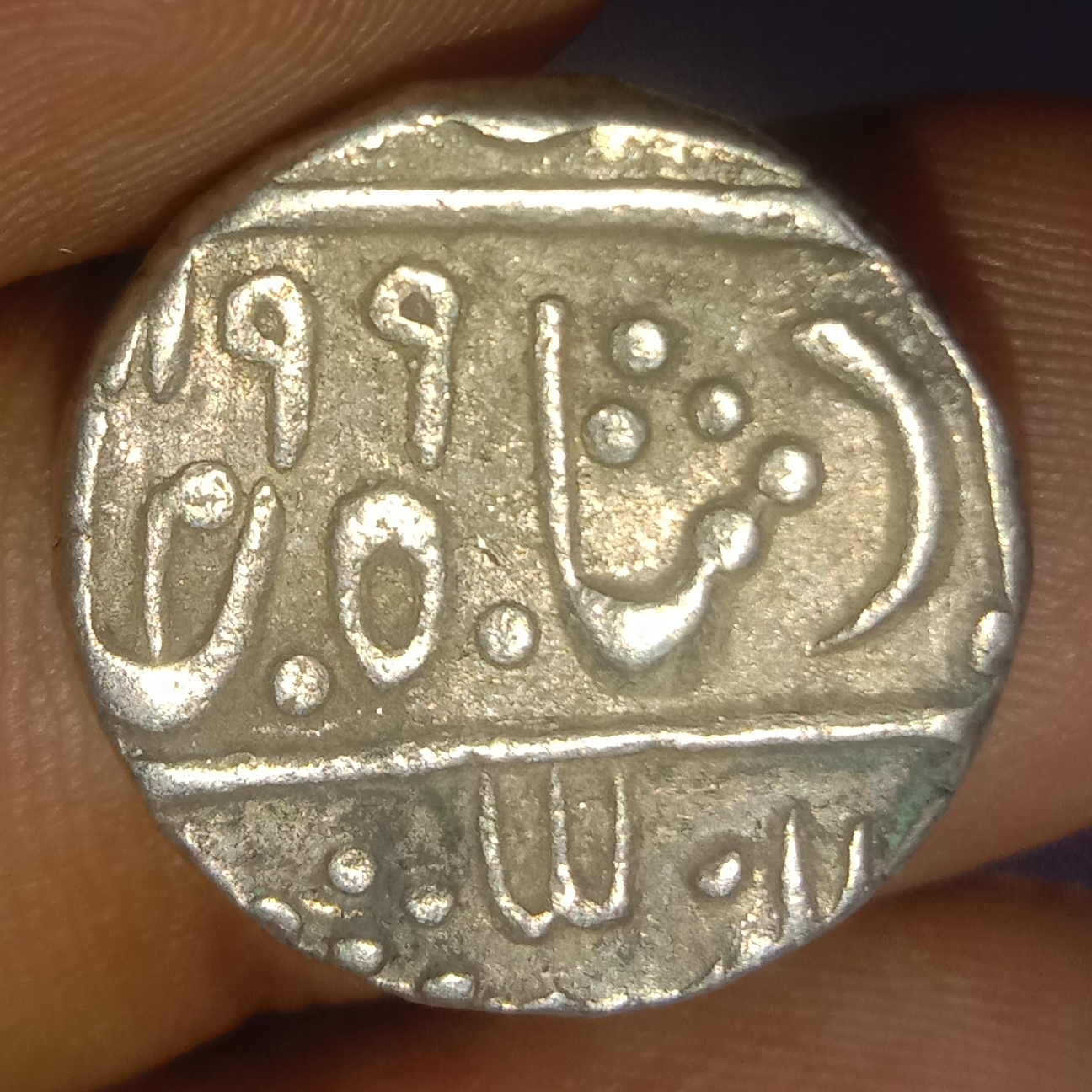

Maharawat of Pratapgarh
- Reign: 1775 –1844
- Predecessor: Maharawat Salam Singh
- Successor: Dalpat Singh
- Born: 5 October 1767
- Died: 5 January 1844 (aged 76)
- Spouse: Rathoreji (Kishan-Singhot) Swarup Kanwarji of Kishangarh; Rathoreji Mertaniji Daulat Kanwarji of Badnor in Mewar; Chauhanji Gulab Kanwarji of Namli in Ratlam; Chauhanji Daulat Kanwarji of Namli in Ratlam
- Issue: Yuvraj Dip Singh; Padam Singh; Sardar Singh; Ajab Kanwarji m.to Maharaja Gambhir Sinhji of Idar; Pran Kanwarji m.to Yuvraj Umed Sinhji Gambhir Sinhji of Idar; Chaman Kanwarji m.to Rana Fateh Sinhji Pratap Sinhji of Lunawada; Takht Kanwarji (marriage not known); Chandan Kanwarji (marriage not known); Ratan Kanwarji (marriage not known)
- House: Pratapgarh
- Dynasty: Sisodia
- Father: Maharawat Salam Singh
- Mother: Rathoreji (Ram-Singhot) Kundan Kanwarji d.of Raja Lal Singh of Amjhera in Malwa

Maharawat Sawant Singh was the Sisodia Rajput ruler of Pratapgarh Kingdom the first junior offshoot second being Shahpuraof the Mewar Kingdom from the year 1775 until his death in 1844.

== Reign ==
He succeeded his father, Salim Singh, to his rank, title, and position as Maharawat of Pratapgarh in 1775. He returned the estate of Dariawad to Mewar because he did not wish to be a vassal of the Maharana. During his reign, Pratapgarh was overrun by the Marathas, and to protect his state from their depredations, he agreed to pay a tribute of 70,000 Salim Shahi rupees to Holkar instead of the tribute previously paid to Mughals. However, their depredations continued, and in an attempt to free himself from the control of the Marathas, he made a treaty with the East India Company in 1804, which Charles Cornwallis dissolved shortly afterward. Later, in 1818, a treaty between him and the East India Company was concluded, under which Pratapgarh was placed under British protection. Shortly after the treaty, he handed over the administration of the state to his son and heir, Dip Singh. Dip Singh initially managed the administration efficiently, but disorders soon emerged as he was reportedly cruel and responsible for the deaths of many people. For which Dip was removed from the office and banished to Deolia. However, he returned to Pratapgarh after a few months and was put in the fort of Achhnera, where he died in 1826. Meanwhile, Sawant Singh had once again assumed control of the state's administration.

== Death ==
He died in 1844 and was succeeded by his grandson Dalpat Singh as Maharawat of Pratapgarh.
