= Jaswant Singh II of Dungarpur =

Maharawal of Dungarpur from 1808 to 1844

Jaswant Singh

Maharawal of Dungarpur
- Reign: 1808 – 1844
- Predecessor: Fateh Singh
- Successor: Udai Singh II
- Regent: Dalpat Singh
- Died: 1846
- Issue: Dalpat Singh (adoptive)
- House: Dungarpur
- Dynasty: Sisodia
- Father: Fateh Singh

Jaswant Singh II was the Maharawal of Dungarpur from 1808 to 1844.

== Biography ==
Jaswant Singh succeeded his father, Fateh Singh, as the Maharawal of Dungarpur after his death in 1808. Bhim Singh of Mewar had hired Sindhi mercenaries to control his disobedient nobles. However, when their wages were delayed, they revolted against him. In 1812, 30,000 mercenaries under the command of Khudadad Khan Sindhi besieged Dungarpur. The siege lasted for twenty days, but the betrayal of a local noble, Mahrup, created an easy path for the Sindhis. He opened the city gates for them at night. He opened the city gates for the Sindhis at night, allowing them to enter and seize control of the city. Jaswant Singh had to flee with his family, accompanied by Rikhab Das and Kishan Das, and seek refuge in the Bhil Pal of Sarana. He remained there while they enjoyed undisputed control until, in 1815, help finally came from Holkar, who defeated them at Galiakot. But he was taken prisoner by the Sindhis, who sent him under a strong escort to Salumbar. When Suraj Mal, the Rawat of Thana, heard this, he assassinated Khudadad Khan and released him, after which Jaswant granted Ramgarh and Datana as a jagir. In 1816, he returned to Dungarpur, and his authority was restored. For the next three years, Dungarpur suffered greatly—first from the Marathas, then from the Pindaris, and finally from its own soldiers, including Arabs, Makranis, and Sindhis. Under these circumstances, he concluded a treaty with the East India Company in 1818, and the state was guaranteed protection against external aggression. He adopted Dalpat Singh, the second son of Dip Singh and grandson of Maharawat Sawant Singh of Pratapgarh, as his son. He was deposed by the British Government in 1825 because he was an incompetent ruler and addicted to the lowest vices. His adopted son, Dalpat Singh, was then appointed regent of the state. When his biological grandfather died, Dalpat Singh succeeded him in Pratapgarh and continued to administer Dungarpur. However, this arrangement was disapproved by the nobles of Dungarpur and the Government of India. On this occasion, Jaswant Singh attempted to regain his authority and elevate Mohkam Singh, the son of Himmat Singh, Thakur of Nandli, to the throne, but local nobles intervened and prevented him from doing so. He was later banished to Mathura, where he was kept under surveillance and received an allowance of Rs. 12,000 a year. He died there in 1846.
