= Dalpat Singh =

Dalpat Singh may refer to:

- Dalpat Singh Paraste (1950-2016), an Indian politician
- Dalpat Singh Shekhawat (1892-1918), a British-Indian soldier
- Dalpat Singh of Pratapgarh, an Indian ruler
