= Raghunath Singh of Pratapgarh =

Maharawat of Pratapgarh from 1890 to 1929

Raghunath Singh
- Maharawat of Pratapgarh
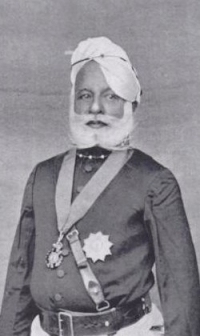

Maharawat of Pratapgarh
- Reign: 1890–1929
- Predecessor: Udai Singh
- Successor: Ram Singh
- Born: 29 December 1859
- Died: 12 January 1929 (aged 69)
- Issue: Man Singh; Govardhan Singh
- House: Pratapgarh
- Dynasty: Sisodia
- Father: Khushal Singh

Sir Raghunath Singh KCIE was the Maharawat of Pratapgarh from 1890 until his death in 1929.

== Early life and family ==
He was born in 1859 to Khushal Singh, Thakur of Arnod. He married three times. His first marriage was to the daughter of the Raja of Pisangan, with whom he had two children: a daughter who married Ganga Singh of Bikaner, and a son, Man Singh. His second marriage was to the daughter of the Maharaj of Semlia in Sailana. His third marriage was to the younger daughter of the Raja of Pisangan, with whom he had two children: a daughter who married the Maharaj Kumar of Sailana and died in 1911, and a son, Govardhan Singh.

== Reign ==
When Udai Singh, the Maharawat of Pratapgarh, died in 1890 without a legitimate successor, his widow adopted Raghunath Singh, his third cousin and closest surviving relative. This choice was confirmed by the Government of India, and he was granted full administrative powers on 10 January 1891. During the Indian famine of 1899–1900, he introduced an efficient system of relief and remitted the land revenue for the year, which amounted to over a lakh and a half. Due to the extravagance of his predecessor, Udai Singh, and the depreciation of the local coinage, Pratapgarh was heavily in debt. To address this, he introduced British currency as the sole legal tender in Pratapgarh in 1904. He reorganized the police, conducted a land revenue settlement based on modern principles, set up a municipality in Pratapgarh, and established courts with graded jurisdiction. He introduced the telegraph and the telephone in Pratapgarh. He constructed a hospital building, established a customs department, and connected Pratapgarh to Mandsaur by a pacca road.

== Honours ==
He was invested with the insignia of Knight Commander of the Order of the Indian Empire by George V during the Delhi Durbar of 1911.
