= Udai Singh of Pratapgarh =

Regent of Dungarpur from 1825 to 1852 and Maharawat of Pratapgarh from 1844 to 1864

Udai Singh
- Maharawat

Maharawat of Pratapgarh
- Reign: 1864 – 1890
- Coronation: 1864
- Investiture: 1865
- Predecessor: Dalpat Singh
- Successor: Raghunath Singh
- Born: 1848
- Died: 1890 (aged 41–42)
- Spouse: Swarup Kunverba
- House: Pratapgarh
- Dynasty: Sisodia
- Father: Raghunath Singh

Udai Singh was Maharawat of Pratapgarh from 1864 until his death in 1890.

== Reign ==
When his father, Dalpat Singh, died in 1864, he succeeded him as Maharawat of Pratapgarh. He was invested with full administrative powers in 1865. He greatly improved the law and order situation in his state and established regular courts. He made many changes in Pratapgarh town and permanently established the capital of the state there. During the Rajputana famine of 1869, he opened poorhouses and fair-price shops, initiated relief works to aid his suffering subjects, and granted land revenue remissions.

== Death ==
He died on 15 February 1890. As he died without a legitimate successor, his widow, Swarup Kunverba, adopted Raghunath Singh, his third cousin and closest surviving relative, who succeeded him as the Maharawat of Pratapgarh.
