= Ram Singh of Pratapgarh =

Maharawat of Pratapgarh from 1929 to 1949

Ram Singh II
- Maharawat

Maharawat of Pratapgarh
- Reign: 18 January 1929 – 9 January 1949
- Predecessor: Raghunath Singh
- Successor: Ambika Pratap Singh
- Born: 12 April 1908
- Died: 9 January 1949 (aged 40)
- House: Pratapgarh
- Dynasty: Sisodia
- Father: Man Singh

Sir Ram Singh II KCSI was the Maharawat of Pratapgarh from 1929 until his death in 1949.

== Early life and education ==
He was born on 12 April 1908 to Man Singh. He was educated at the Mayo College, Ajmer. There he passed his diploma examination in 1927. From a young age, he developed an interest in animals, making their study a hobby that eventually earned him a Fellowship of the Zoological Society.

== Reign ==
He succeeded as Maharawat of Pratapgarh upon the death of his grandfather, Raghunath Singh, on 18 January 1929.

== Personal life ==
=== Marriages ===
Ram Singh was married three times. He first married in 1924 to the eldest daughter of Rao Raja Madho Singh of Sikar, who died in 1931. He married a second time to the second daughter of Maharaja Sir Keshav Prasad Singh of Dumraon. His third marriage was to the third daughter of Maharana Raj Sahib of Dhrangadhra.
