= Pratapgarh State =

Princely state of India

Coordinates: 24.03°N 74.78°E

- Princely State of British India
- 1425–1949
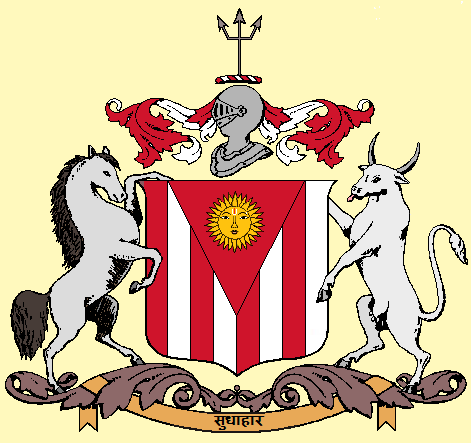
- Flag Coat of arms

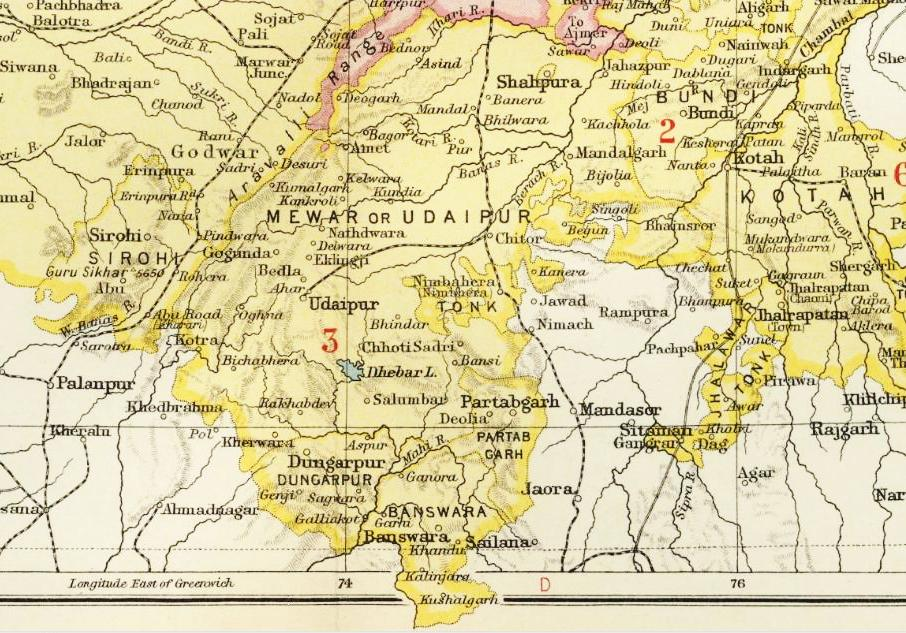
- Pratapgarh State (Partabgarh) in the Imperial Gazetteer of India
- Capital: Pratapgarh
- Area
  - 1901: 2,303 km^{2} (889 sq mi)
- Population
  - 1901: 52,025
- History
  - Established: 1425
  - Accession to the Union of India: 1949
| Succeeded by |
| India |
- Today part of: Rajasthan, India

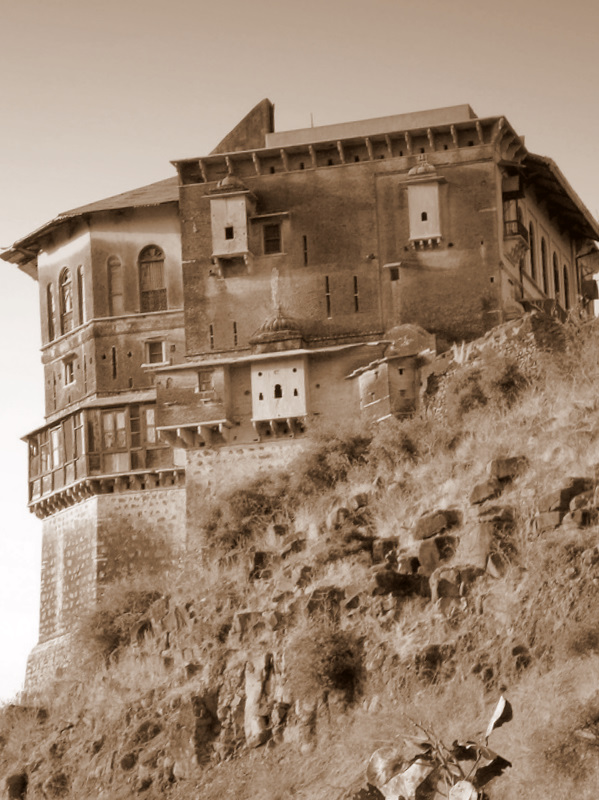
View of the Old Palace, Pratapgarh.

Pratapgarh State, also known as Partabgarh, was one of the princely states of India during the period of the British Raj. The state was founded in 1425 as Kanthal state and was later renamed after its capital located in Pratapgarh, Rajasthan.

Pratapgarh was a 15 gun salute princely state; its last ruler signed the accession to the Indian Union on 7 April 1949.

== History ==
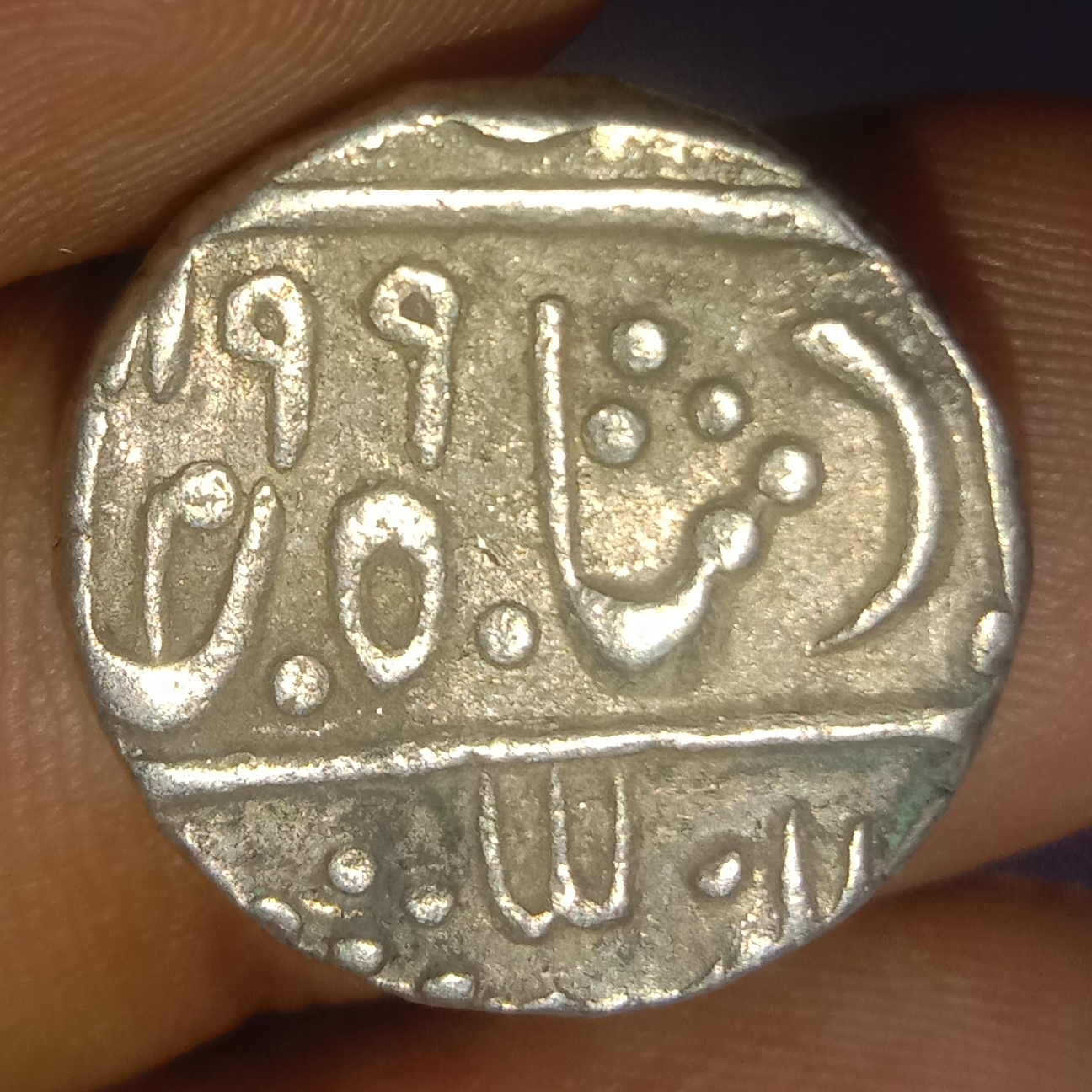
Silver one Rupee coin of the princely state of Pratapgarh, issued in the name of ruler Sawant Singh, Julus year (RY) 29, AH 1199.

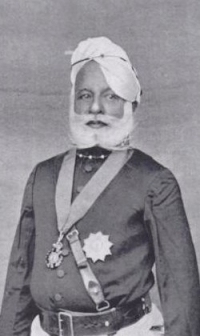
Photo of the ruler Raghunath Singh of Pratapgarh (r. 1890–1929)

Maharana Kumbha ruled Chittorgarh in the 14th century. Due to a dispute with his younger brother Kshemkarn he expelled him from his territory. Kshemkarn's family was refugee for some time and lived in the Aravalli Range in the southern area of Rajasthan. In 1425 Kanthal state was founded. In 1514 Rajkumar Surajmal became the ruler of Devgarh, and this raj later came to be known as Pratapgarh raj. As the environment of Devgarh was not found to be suitable by the royal family, one of the descendants of Raja Surajmal, Rajkumar Pratap Singh started to build a new town near Devgarh in 1698 and named it Pratapgarh. Pratapgarh first entered into relations with the British with a treaty in 1804, which Lord Cornwallis subsequently cancelled. A new treaty was signed in 1818, entering Pratapgarh into a subsidiary alliance.

=== Rulers ===
They had the right to a 15 gun salute.

==== Maharawat ====
- 1775–1844: Sawant Singh
- 1844–1864: Dalpat Singh
- 1864 – 15 February 1890: Udai Singh
- 1890 – 18 January 1929: Raghunath Singh (b. 1857 – d. 1929)
- 1929 – 15 August 1947: Ram Singh (b. 1908 – d. 1949)

== See also ==
- List of Rajput dynasties and states
- Mewar Residency
- Rajputana Agency
