= Namli =

- Town
- Location in Madhya Pradesh, India Namli (India)
- Coordinates: 23.43°N 75.05°E
- Country: India
- State: Madhya Pradesh
- District: Ratlam

Area
  - Total: 15 km^{2} (5.8 sq mi)
- Elevation: 490 m (1,610 ft)

Population (2021)
  - Total: 25,250
  - Density: 1,700/km^{2} (4,400/sq mi)

Languages
  - Official: Hindi
- Time zone: UTC+5:30 (IST)
- ISO 3166 code: IN-MP
- Vehicle registration: MP 43

Namli is a town in Ratlam district in the Indian state of Madhya Pradesh.

== Geography ==
Namli is located at 23.43°N 75.05°E. It has an average elevation of 490 metres (1,607 feet). It is 14 km north from Ratlam. Namli has one biggest kocha lake and hence most of the time, water supply for humans and farming is made available through. Namli has two biodiversity park water wells.

== Demographics ==
As of 2021 India census, Namli had a population of 25,250. Males constitute 51% of the population and females 49%. Namli has an average literacy rate of 65%, higher than the national average of 59.5%: male literacy is 77%, and female literacy is 53%. In Namli, 15% of the population is under 6 years of age.
