= Gaib Sagar Lake =

Artificial lake in Rajasthan, India

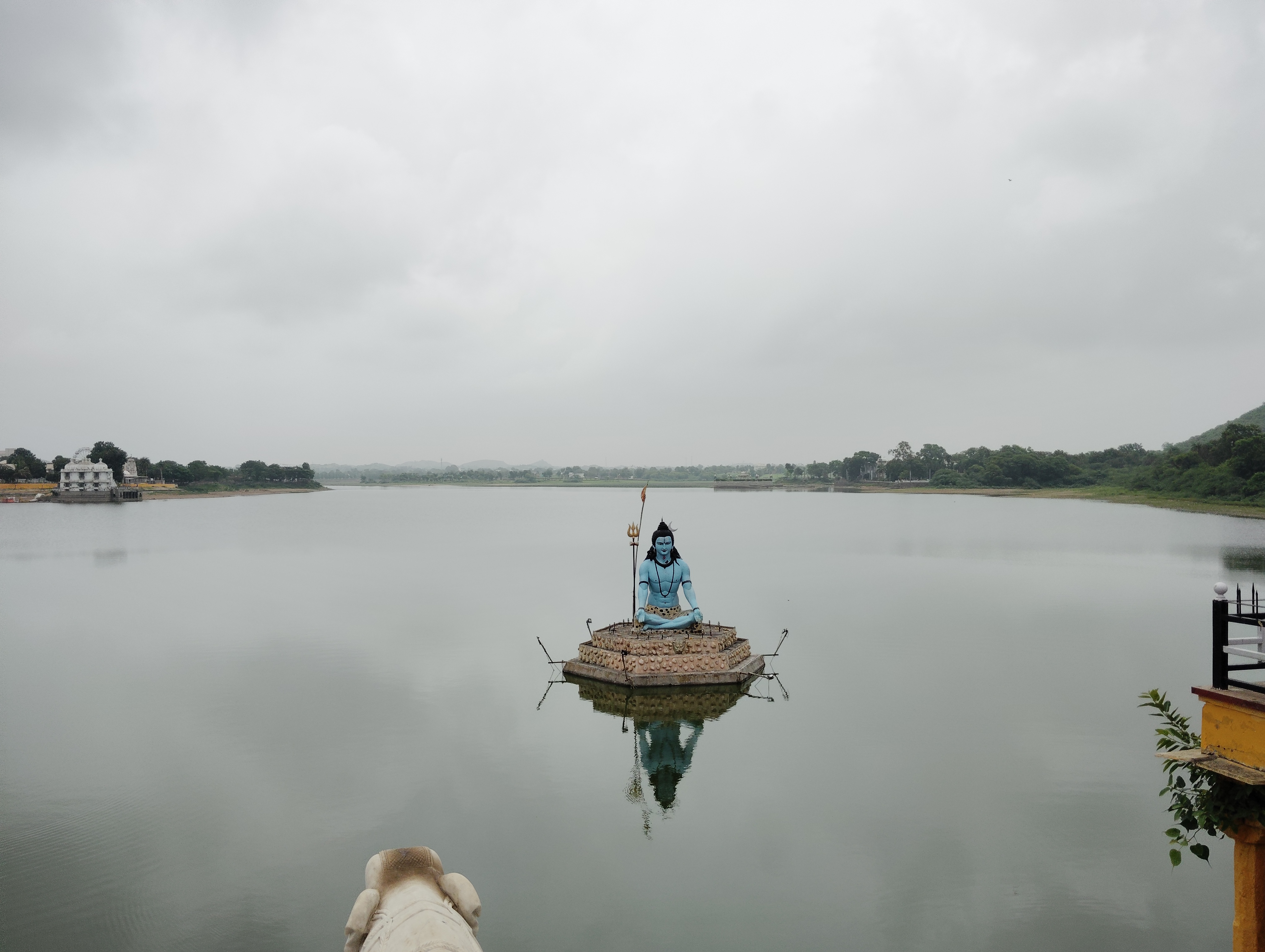
- Gaib Sagar Lake

- Location within Rajasthan
- Location: Dungarpur, Rajasthan, India
- Coordinates: 23.839°N 73.719°E
- Type: Lake
- Settlements: Dungarpur

Gaib Sagar Lake, also known as Gap Sagar Lake, is an artificial lake in present-day Dungarpur, Rajasthan, India. It was built by Maharawal Gopinath (Gaipa Rawal) of Dungarpur State in 1428.

== History ==
Maharawal Gopinath also built Badal Mahal at the centre of the Lake. Maharawal Punja Raj (1609–1657) built Sri Govardhannath temple on the main pal of this Lake. Vijay Rajarajeshwar Temple was started by Maharawal Vijay Singh (1898–1918) but it was established by Maharawal Lakshman Singh in 1932.

== See also ==
- Adinath Temple, Dungarpur
