= Dungarpur State =

Historical state

Coordinates: 23.83°N 73.72°E

- Independent (1177– 1527); Under the Mughal Empire (1527– 1713); Independent (1713–1818); Protectorate of the East India Company (1818–1857); Princely state of the British Raj (1857–1947)
- Flag

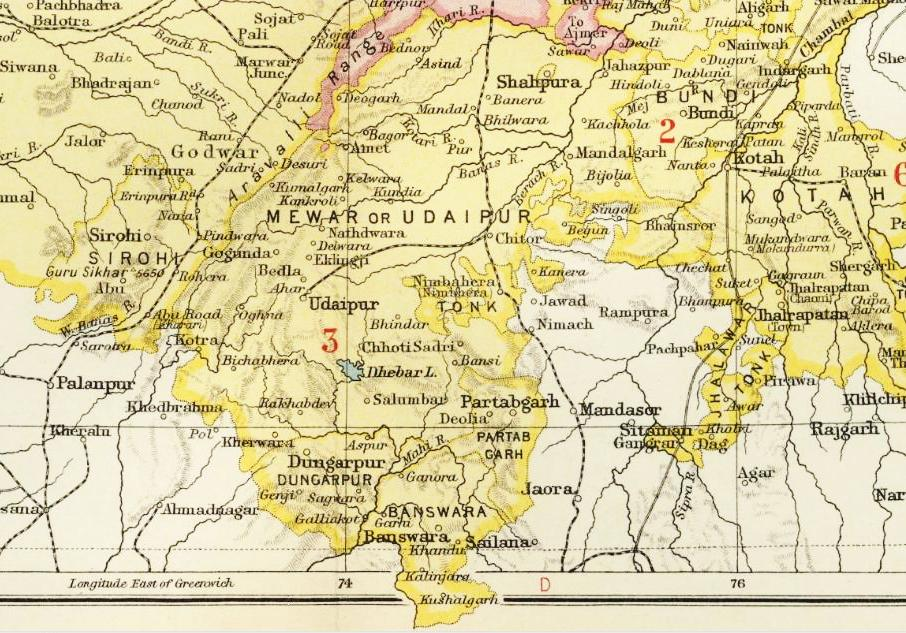
- Dungarpur State in The Imperial Gazetteer of India
- Capital: Dungarpur
- Area
  - 1901: 3,781 km^{2} (1,460 sq mi)
- Population
  - 1901: 100,103
- Government
- Maharawal
  - 1177–1192: Samant Singh (First)
  - 1918–1949: Laxman Singh (Last)
Succeeded by
Rajasthan
- Today part of: Rajasthan, India
- Dungarpur (Princely State)

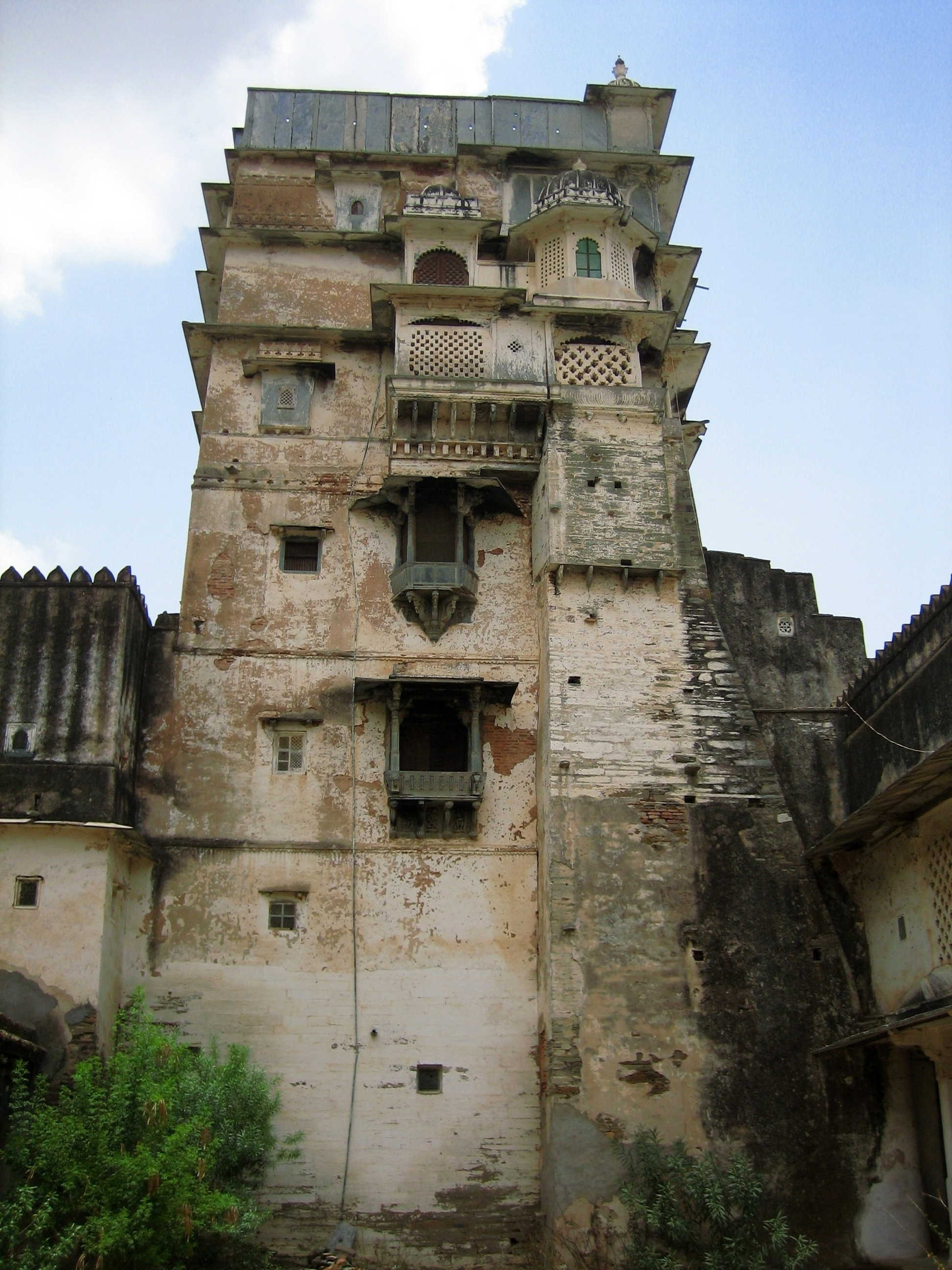
View of the Juna Mahal Palace of Dungarpur

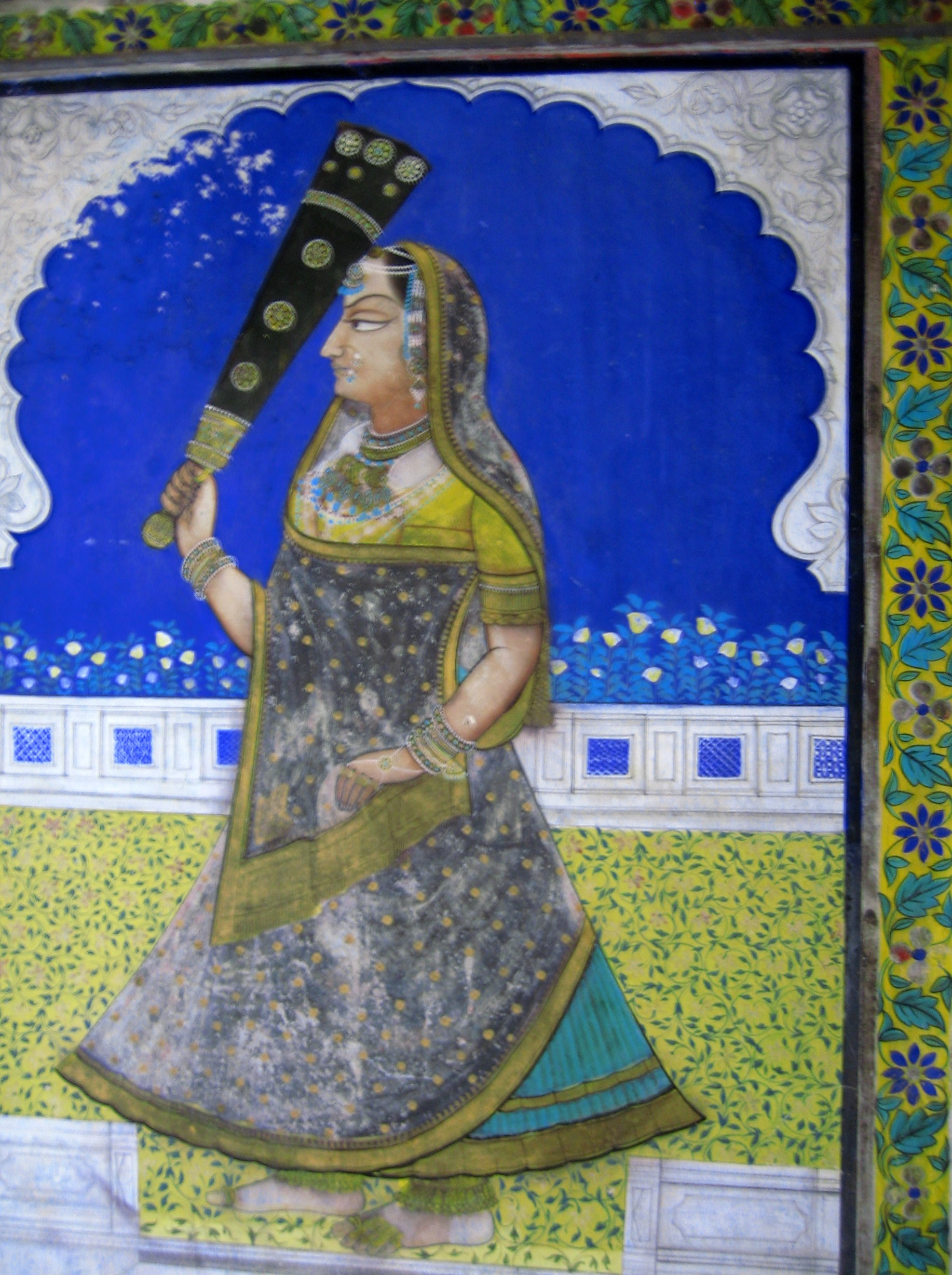
Painting on a wall of the Juna Mahal Palace

Dungarpur State was a kingdom and later princely state during the British Raj. Its capital was the city of Dungarpur in the southernmost area of present-day Rajasthan State in India. In 1901 the total population of Dungarpur State was 100,103, while that of the town was 6,094.

Dungarpur is the seat of elder branch of Sisodiyas of Udaipur, while the younger branch is the seat of the Maharana of Mewar.

== History ==
Dungarpur State was founded in 1177 by Samant Singh, the eldest son of the ruler of Mewar, Karan Singh. They are descendants of Bappa Rawal, eighth ruler of the Guhilot Dynasty and founder of the Mewar Dynasty (r. 734-753). The chiefs of the state, who bear the title of Maharawal, are descended from Mahup, eldest son of Karan Singh, chief of Mewar in the 12th century, and claim the honours of the elder line of Mewar. Mahup, disinherited by his father, took refuge with his mother's family, the Chauhans of Bagar, and made himself master of that country at the expense of the Bhil chiefs, while his younger brother Rahup founded a separate Sisodia dynasty.

Originally, the maharawals had their capital at Baroda. A Sanskrit inscription dated to April 1287 identifies the ruler Vīrasiṃhadeva as the mahārājakula (the Sanskrit form of "maharawal") of Vaṭapadraka (the Sanskrit name for Baroda). This inscription, the earliest known of Vīrasiṃhadeva, records him granting land "for the spiritual welfare of" his predecessor Devapāladeva (who is also known as Dedā or Dedu). The last dated inscription of Vīrasiṃhadeva is from 1302. Baroda remained the capital until the time of his grandson Ḍuṅgarasiṃha, who founded the city of Dungarpur, which was named after him.

The town of Dungarpur, the capital of the state, is traditionally held to have been founded in 1282 CE by Rawal Vir Singh, who named it after Dungaria, an independent Bhil chieftain whom he had caused to be assassinated. After the death of Rawal Udai Singh of Vagad at the Battle of Khanwa in 1527, where he fought alongside Rana Sanga against Babur, his territories were divided into the states of Dungarpur and Banswara. Udai's elder son Prithviraj succeeded his father as the rawal of Dungarpur and his younger son Jagmal became the first ruler of Banswara. Rawal Askaran accepted Mughal Suzerainty and became a vassal of Mughal Empire It remained successively under Mughal until 1713. the Marathas indirectly controlled the region in 1736. The British Raj controlled the state by treaty in 1818, where it remained a 15-gun salute state. The revenue of the state was Rs.2,00,000 in 1901.

== List of Rulers ==
=== Rawals ===
The rulers belonged to the Guhila Dynasty of the Ahara Guhilot clan.

- Before 1287: Devapāladeva, aka Dedā or Dedu
- Before April 1287 – after 1302: Maharawal Vir Singh (attested in contemporary inscriptions as mahārājakula Vīrasiṃha-deva, the Sanskrit form of his name)
- After 1302: Maharawal Dungar Singh (grandson of Vir Singh and namesake of Dungarpur)
- 1404: Rawal Pratap Singh
- 1440 – 1455: Maharawal Gopinath (Gaipa Rawal). He constructed Gaib Sagar Lake and Badal Mahal in Dungarpur
- 1455 – 1480: Maharawal Somdas
- 1481 – 1504: Maharawal Gangadas
- 1504 – 1527: Maharawal Udai Singh
- 1527 – 1549: Maharawal Prithviraj
- 1549 – 1587: Maharawal Askaran
- 1587 – 1604: Maharawal Sahasmal
- 1604– 1609: Maharawal Karan Singh II
- 1609 – 1658: Maharawal Punja
- 1658 – 1659: Maharawal Girdhardas
- 1659 – 1691: Maharawal Jaswant Singh I
- 1691 – 1700: Maharawal Khuman Singh
- 1700 – 1728: Maharawal Ram Singh
- 1728 – 1783: Maharawal Shiv Singh
- 1783 – 1789: Maharawal Bairisal
- 1789 – 1808: Maharawal Fateh Singh
- 1808 – 1846: Maharawal Jaswant Singh II
- 1846 – 1898: HH Maharawal Sir Udai Singh II (b. 1838 – d. 1898)
- 13 Feb 1898 – 15 Nov 1918: HH Maharawal Sir Bijai Singh (b. 1887 – d. 1918)
- 15 Nov 1918 – 15 Aug 1947: HH Maharawal Sir Lakshman Singh (b. 1908 – d. 1989)

The last princely ruler of Dungarpur was HH Rai-i-Rayan Maharawal Shri Lakshman Singh Bahadur (1918–1989), who was awarded KCSI (1935) and GCIE (1947), and after independence became a Member of the Rajya Sabha twice, in 1952 and 1958, and later a member of Rajasthan Legislative Assembly (MLA) in 1962 and 1989.

=== Titular Maharawals ===
- HH Maharawal Mahipal Singh
- HH Maharawal Harshvardhan Singh

== See also ==
- List of Rajput dynasties and states
- Mewar Residency
- Dungarpur district
