= Sabli =

Coordinates: 23.8668°N 73.5726°E

Sabli is a village situated in the Dungarpur district of Rajasthan, India, with a population of about 12,000 and noted for a 'Shiva' temple situated in it. It is 17 kilometres (11 mi) from the city Dungarpur.

== Culture ==
Shivling Situated at Temple of Sabli

Sabli is a Thikana Of Mr. Jaipal singh Sabli Dungarpur.

According to Indian Mythology, Shiva is praised by a Statue/Sculpture called 'Shivling'. In 'Sabli', there is a Shiva temple which is believed to have previously been a farm where a 'Shivling' was found in the ground during harvesting by the farmer. People come here and pray for their bright fortune on every Monday (The Day Of Lord Shiva according to Indian Mythology). It is believed that the 'Shivling' rises a bit upwards, every year. People here also believe that the wishes they ask in the temple for, by the true heart, are fulfilled by the Shiva.
