= Mewar =

Region in the Indian state of Rajasthan

Mewar मेवाड़
- Historical region (Kingdom of Mewar)
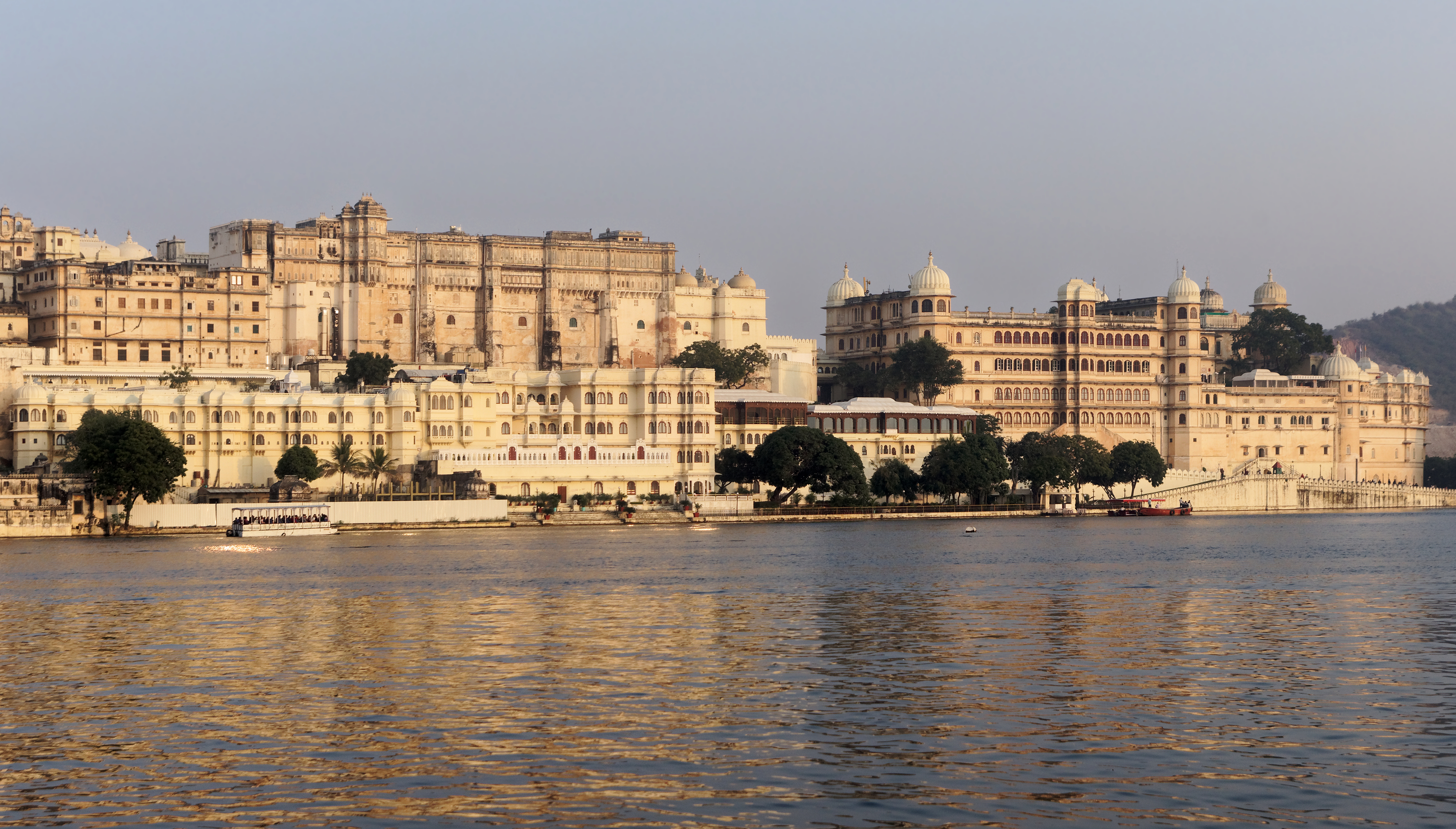
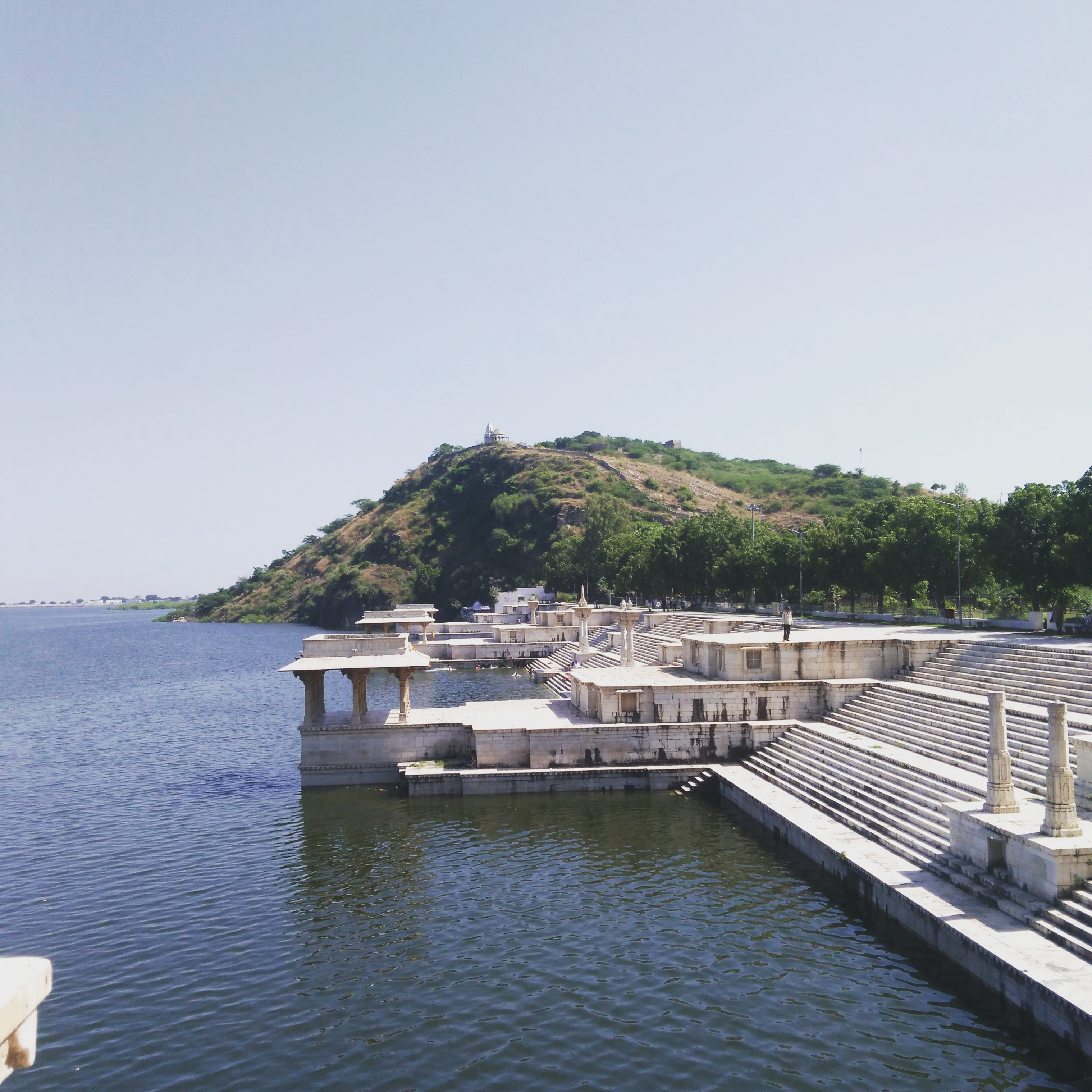
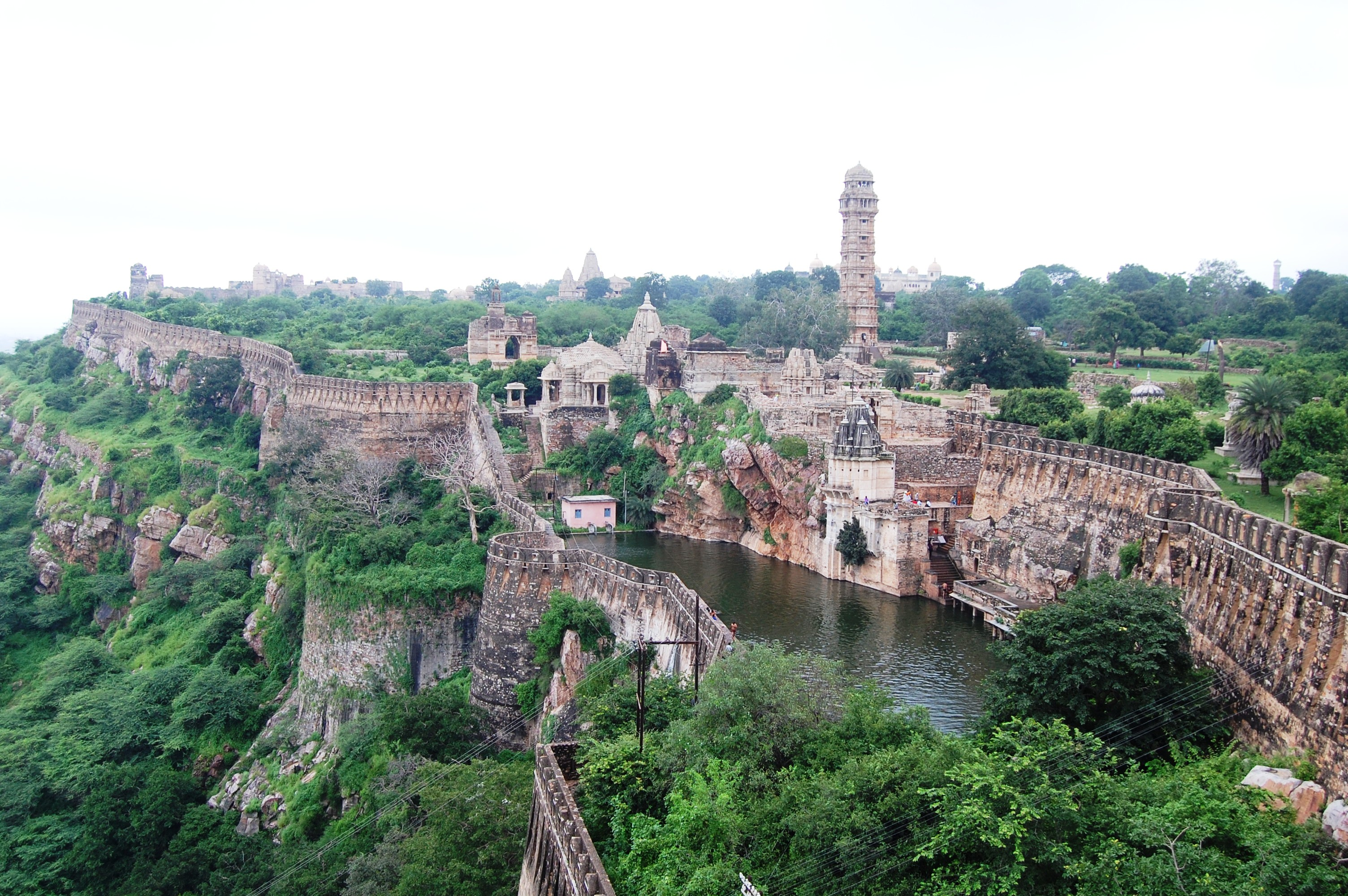
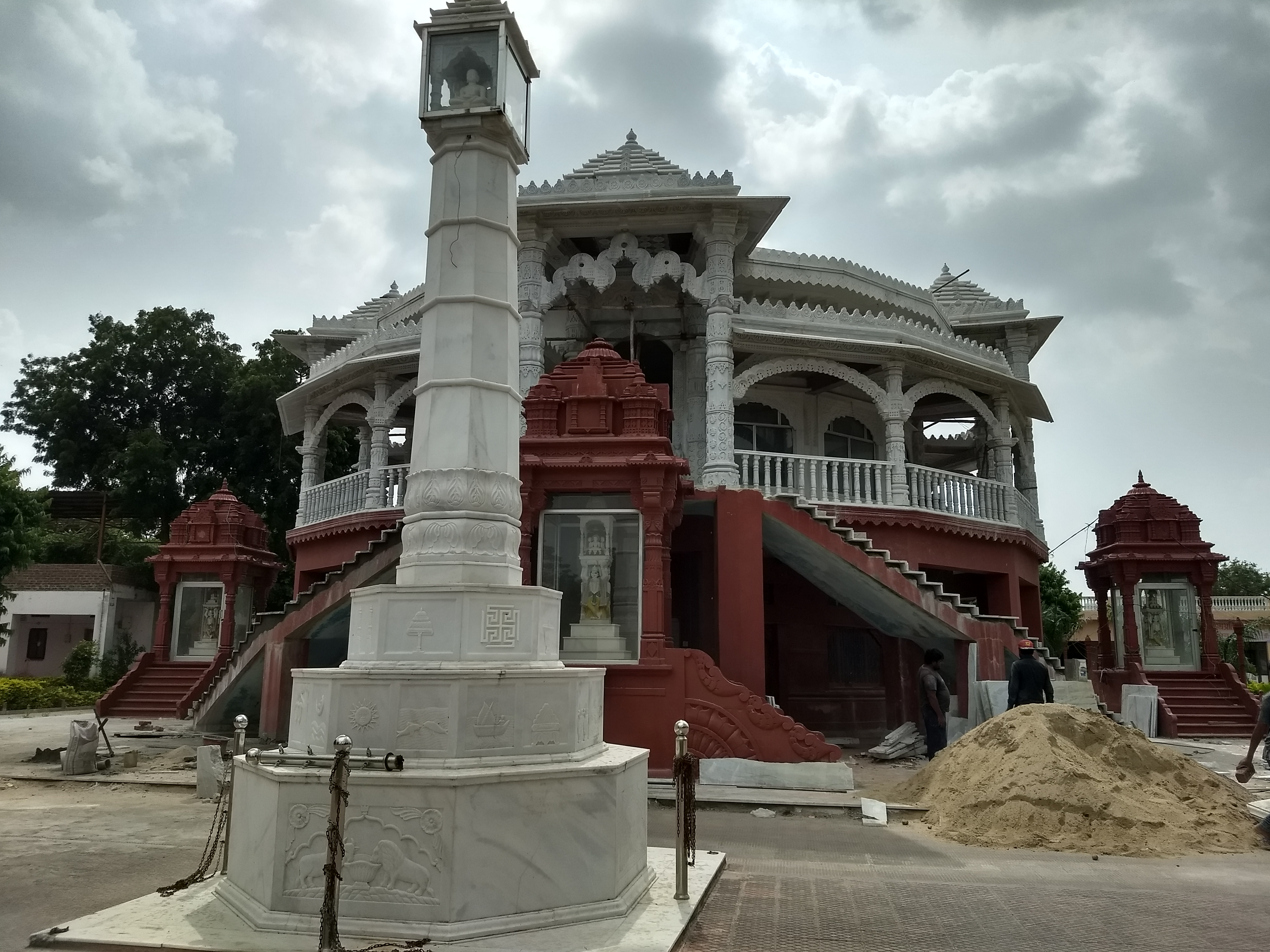
- City Palace, Udaipur Rajsamand Lake, Rajsamand Chittor Fort, Chittorgarh Bijolia Parshvanath temple, Bhilwara

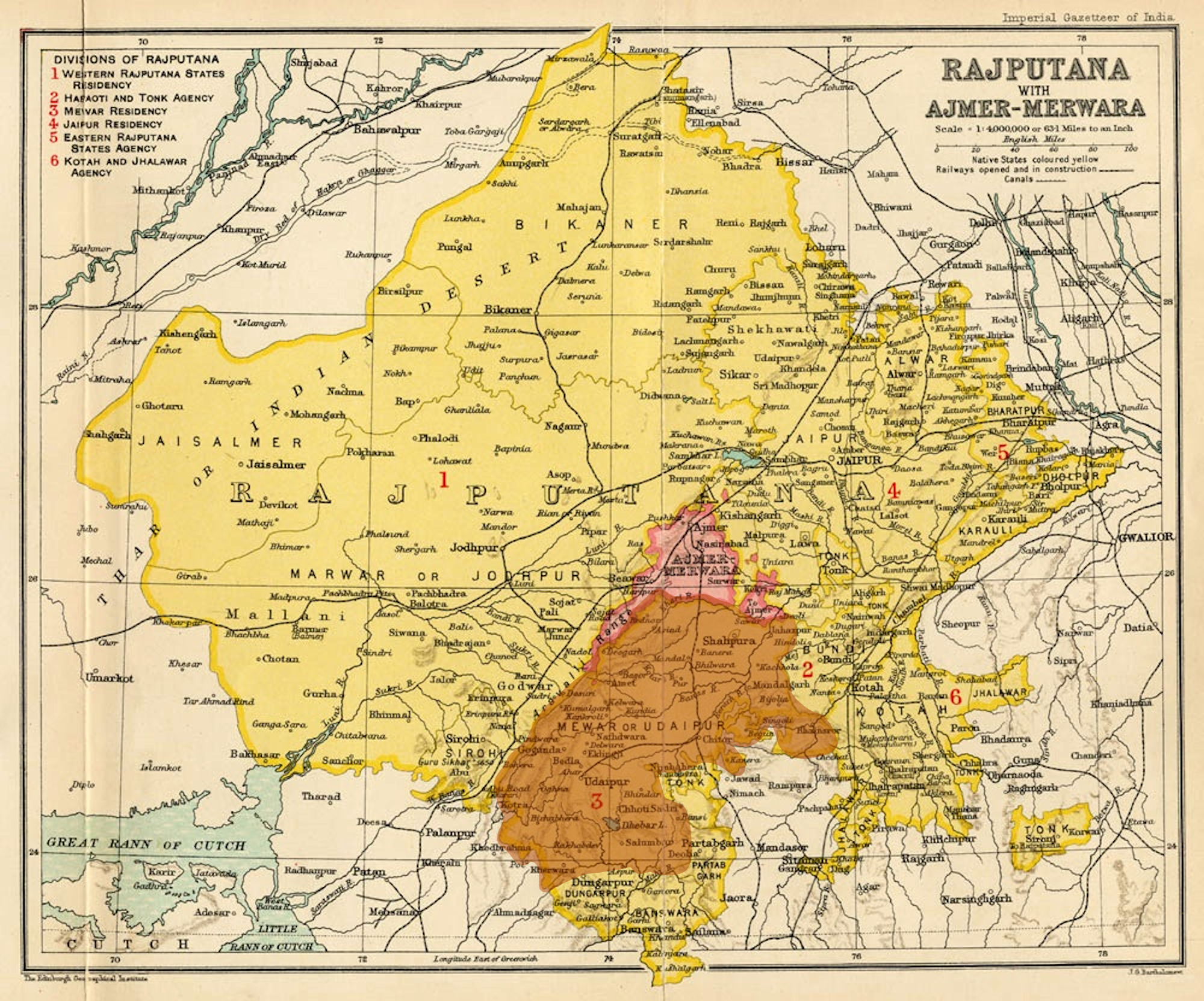
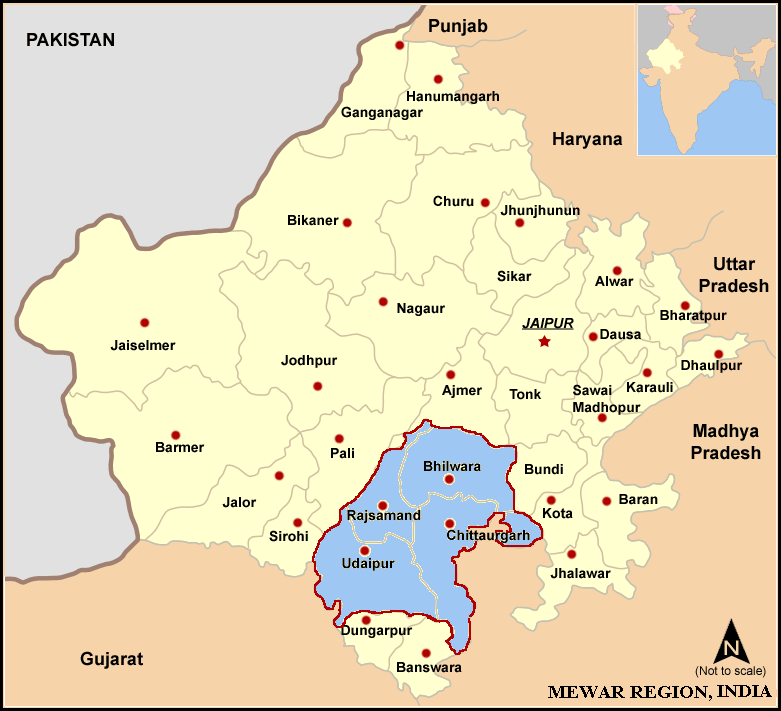
- Top: Kingdom of Mewar within Rajputana c.1907-1909 Bottom: Mewar region in Rajasthan, India
- Country: India
- State: Rajasthan
- Districts: Udaipur, Rajsamand, Bhilwara, Chittorgarh and Pratapgarh

Area
  - Total: 33,517 km^{2} (12,941 sq mi)

Population (2011)
  - Total: 9,045,726
  - Density: 269.88/km^{2} (699.00/sq mi)
- Demonym: Mewaris
- Largest city: Udaipur
- Regional Language or dialect: Mewari (Rajasthani)

Mewar, also spelled as Mewad, is a historical region located in the south-eastern part of the Indian state of Rajasthan. It includes the present-day districts of Udaipur, Rajsamand, Bhilwara, Chittorgarh and Pratapgarh in Rajasthan. The language of this region is known as Mewari, one of the dialects of the Rajasthani language spoken as a lingua franca by the different ethnic groups assembled altogether in one identity called the Mewaris.

== Background ==
For centuries, the region was ruled by Rajputs as Kingdom of Mewar. During the period of British East India Company, it became a princely state as Udaipur. It emerged as an administrative unit during the period governance in India and remained until the end of the British Raj era.

The Mewar region lies between the Aravali Range to the northwest, Ajmer to the north, Gujarat and the Vagad region of Rajasthan to the south, the Malwa region of Madhya Pradesh state to the south and the Hadoti region of Rajasthan to the east.

== Etymology ==
The word "Mewar" is vernacular form of "Medapata" (IAST: Medapāṭa), the ancient name of the region. The earliest epigraph that mentions the word "Medapata" is a 996–997 CE (1053 VS) inscription discovered at Hathundi (Bijapur). The word "pata" or "pataka" refers to an administrative unit. According to the historian G. C. Raychaudhuri, Medapata was named after the Meda tribe, which has been mentioned in Varāhamihira's Brihat-Samhita. The 1460 Kumbhalgarh inscription associates the Medas with Vardhana-giri (modern Badnor in Mewar region). Historian Sashi Bhusan Chaudhuri associates the ancient Medas with the modern Mer people.

The 1285 CE (1342 VS) Mount Abu (Achaleshwar) inscription of the Guhila king Samarasimha provides the following etymology while describing the military conquests of his ancestor Bappa Rawal (Bappaka): and the [MEWAR] name was given by 'lord' [SHIVA] to the [Bappaka] then this dynesty got new name that is known as [ MEWAR] till now . "This country which was, in battle, totally submerged in the dripping fat ('medas' in Sanskrit) of wicked people by Bappaka bears the name of Śrī Medapāṭa." Historian Anil Chandra Banerjee dismisses this as a "poetic fancy", but acknowledges the 'terrible' battles fought between the Rajputs and the Arabs.

== Geography ==
The northern and eastern portions of Mewar are made up of an elevated plateau while the western and southern portions were rocky and hilly with dense forests. The watershed divide between drainage of the Bay of Bengal and drainage of the Gulf of Khambhat runs almost through the centre of Mewar. The northern and eastern part of Mewar is a gently sloping plain, drained by the Bedach and Banas River and its tributaries, which empty northwest into the Chambal River, a tributary of the Yamuna River. The southern and western part of the region is hilly, and marks the divide between the Banas and its tributaries and the headwaters of the Sabarmati and Mahi rivers and their tributaries, which drain south into the Gulf of Khambhat through Gujarat state. The Aravalli Range, which forms the northwestern boundary of the region, is composed mostly of sedimentary rocks, like marble and Kota Stone, which has traditionally been an important construction material.

The region is part of the Khathiar-Gir dry deciduous forests' ecoregion. Protected areas include the Jaisamand Wildlife Sanctuary, the Kumbhalgarh Wildlife Sanctuary, the Bassi Wildlife Sanctuary, the Gandhi Sagar Sanctuary and the Sita Mata Wildlife Sanctuary.

Mewar has a tropical climate. Rainfall averages 660 mm/year, and is generally higher in the southwest and lower in the northeast of the region. Over 90% of the rain typically falls in the period of June to September every year, during the southwest monsoon.

According to the 2011 Census of India this region has a population of 9,045,726 people.

== Settlements ==
=== Urban areas ===
- Bari Sadri
- Bhindar
- Dhariawad
- Gogunda
- Kanor

=== Villages ===
- Baansi

== See also ==
- Marwar
- Shekhawati
- Bagar
- Dhundhar
- Hadoti
- Vagad
- Ajmer-Merwara
