= Mahesh Raj Soni =

Indian craftsman

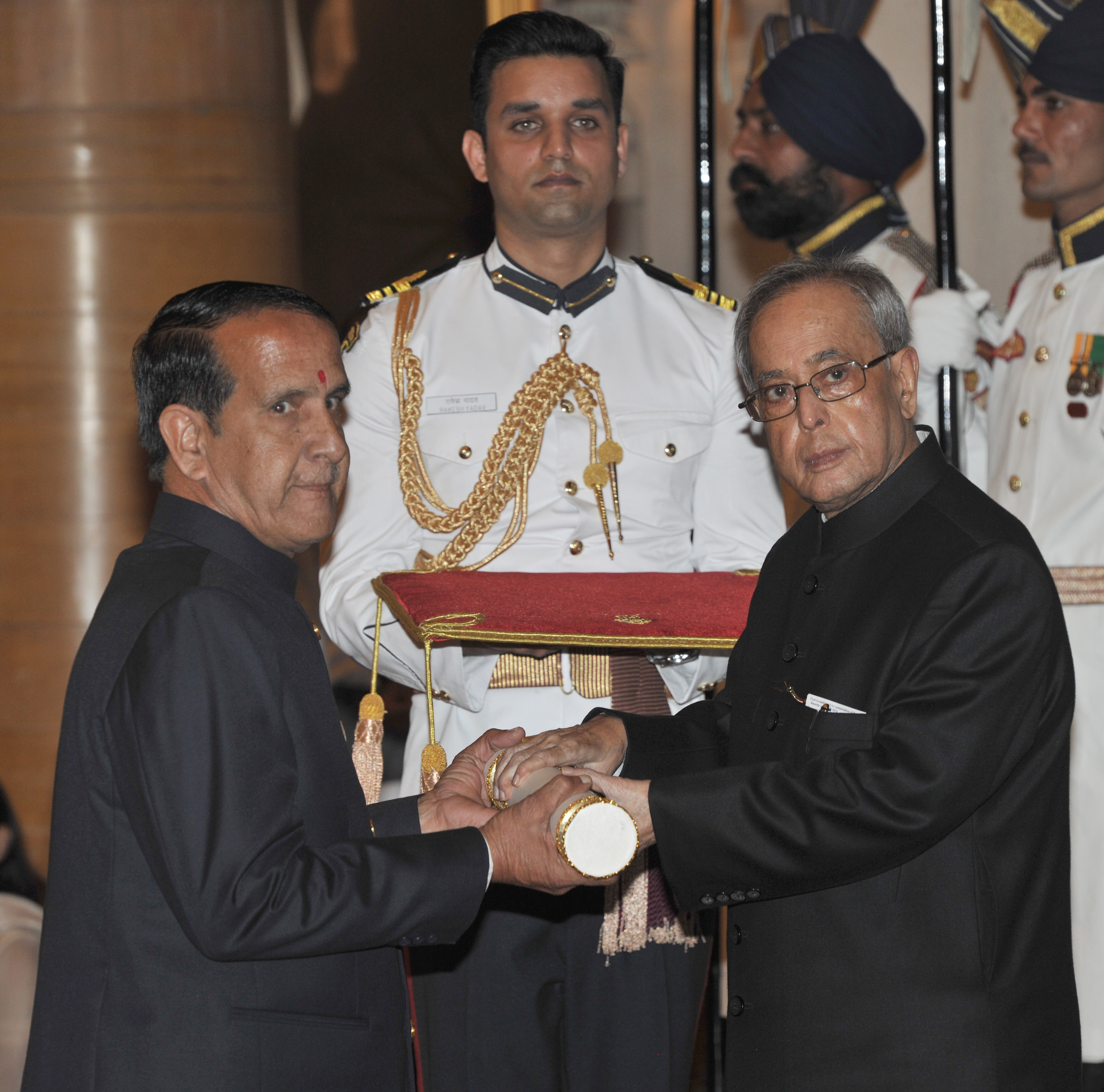
- President Pranab Mukherjee presenting the Padma Shri Award to Rajsoni (left) in 2015
- Born: Pratapgarh, Rajasthan, India
- Died: 25 February 2019
- Occupation: Craftsman
- Known for: Thewa art
- Awards: Padma Shri

Mahesh Raj Soni is an Indian craftsman specialising in the traditional art of Thewa, a Rajasthani jewellery making tradition using glass and gold leaves and is one of the surviving exponents of the art form which has roots in Pratapgarh, Rajasthan. He is a member of Rajasthan Thewa Kala Sansthan and has featured in the Limca Book of World Records in its 2011 edition. Soni, who is a cancer survivor, was honoured by the Government of India in 2015 with Padma Shri, the fourth highest Indian civilian award.

== See also ==
- Thewa
