= Jakham Dam =

Dam in Rajasthan, northern India

- Interactive map of Jakham Dam
- Location: Pratapgarh District, Rajasthan, India
- Coordinates: 24.169939°N 74.590983°E
- Purpose: Irrigation
- Status: Operational
- Construction began: 1969–70
- Opening date: 1986 (completion), March 2000 (irrigation project)
- Owner: Government of Rajasthan

Dam and spillways
- Length: 253 m (830 ft)

Reservoir
- Total capacity: 5,015 million cubic feet (142.0×10^{6} m^{3})
- Active capacity: 4,671 million cubic feet (132.3×10^{6} m^{3})

Jakham Dam is a dam located in Pratapgarh District in Rajasthan in India. It is located in Anooppura village of Pratapgarh Tehsil, 32 km from Dhariawad and 35 km from Pratapgarh town. The dam is a main irrigation project of the area.

This dam is built on the Jakham river, which originates from a small village Jakhamia in Chhoti Sadrisub division. The Jakham dam's foundation was laid on 14 May 1968 by then chief minister Mohan Lal Sukhadia, however the actual construction-work of the dam started in 1969–70. The dam itself was completed in 1986, but took another twelve years for the completion of this irrigation project in March 2000.

Initially the catchment of the Jakham Dam was 5,015 MCft for irrigating 52,354 hectares of land. Out of its total water retention capacity of 5,015 MCft, the usable water capacity is 4,671 MC ft. The cost of this project is 106.03 crore. The length of this Dam is 253 meters, out of which spill way is in 90 m in length. The area around the dam is hilly and rugged. 13 km away from the main dam, Nangaliya pickup ware has been constructed with Left main canal (39.90 km) and right main canal(34.12 km). Irrigation facility is being provided in 118 villages in Dhariyawad sub-division.
