= Dhariawad Assembly constituency =

Legislative Assembly constituency in Rajasthan State, India

Coordinates: 24.1°N 74.44°E

Dhariawad
- Constituency No. 157 for the Rajasthan Legislative Assembly

Constituency details
- Country: India
- Region: North India
- State: Rajasthan
- District: Pratapgarh
- Lok Sabha constituency: Udaipur
- Established: 2008
- Total electors: 274,756
- Reservation: ST

Member of Legislative Assembly
- 16th Rajasthan Legislative Assembly
- Incumbent Thavar Chand Meena
- Party: BAP
- Alliance: INDIA
- Elected year: 2023

Dhariawad Assembly constituency is one of the 200 Legislative Assembly constituencies of Rajasthan state in India.

It is part of Pratapgarh district and is reserved for candidates belonging to the Scheduled Tribes.

== Members of the Legislative Assembly ==
Year	Member	Party
2018	Gautam Lal Meena	Bharatiya Janata Party
2021 (Note: bypoll)	Nagraj Meena	Indian National Congress
2023	Thavar Chand Meena	Bharat Adivasi Party

== Election results ==
=== 2023 ===
2023 Rajasthan Legislative Assembly election:Dhariawad
Party	Candidate	Votes	%	±%
BAP	Thavar Chand Meena	83,655	37.67	
BJP	Kanhiya Lal Meena	76,964	34.66	▲14.99
INC	Nagraj	46,449	20.92	▼16.46
Independent	Vishesh Kumar Meena	3,377	1.52	
AAP	Kaluram	2,465	1.11	
BSP	Kanhaiyalal S/O Amritlal	2,394	1.08	▼1.22
NOTA	None of the above	3,294	1.48	▼1.49
Majority		6,691	3.01	▼9.26
Turnout		222,081	80.83	▲2.55
BAP gain from BJP		Swing		

=== 2021 ===
Bye-election, 2021: Dhariawad
Party	Candidate	Votes	%	±%
INC	Nagraj Meena	69,819	39.16	▲1.78
IND	Thavar Chand Meena	51,094	28.66	New
BJP	Khet Singh	46,487	26.08	▼23.57
IND	Kailash	3,174	1.78	New
BTP	Ganesh Lal Meena	2,290	1.28	New
NOTA	None of the Above	3,230	1.81	▼1.16
Majority		18,725	10.50	▼2.15
Turnout		1,78,303	69.21	▼9.11
INC gain from BJP		Swing		

=== 2018 ===
2018 Rajasthan Legislative Assembly election: Dhariawad
Party	Candidate	Votes	%	±%
BJP	Gotam Lal	96,457	49.65	
INC	Nagraj Meena	72,615	37.38	
CPI	Bhagwan Lal	5,280	2.72	
BSP	Kesulal	4,465	2.3	
BTP	Bheru Lal	4,406	2.27	
Unknown	Gautama Lal Meena	2,124	1.09	
Bharatiya Yuva Shakti	Shankar Lal	2,117	1.09	
NOTA	None of the above	5,769	2.97	
Majority		23,842	12.27	
Turnout		194,277	78.28	
BJP hold		Swing		

=== 2013 ===
2013 Rajasthan Legislative Assembly election: Dhariawad
Party	Candidate	Votes	%	±%
BJP	Gotam Lal	65,954	38.48	
INC	Nagraj Meena	58,780	34.30	
IND	Narayan Bhai	17,336	10.12	
NPEP	Keshu Lal	11,781	6.87	
NOTA	None of the Above	5,769	2.97	
Majority		7,174	4.35	
Turnout		1,71,484	79.45	
BJP gain from INC		Swing		

== See also ==
- List of constituencies of the Rajasthan Legislative Assembly
- Pratapgarh district
