= Thavar Chand Meena =

Indian politician

Member of Rajasthan Legislative Assembly
- Incumbent
- Assumed office 3 December 2023
- Preceded by: Nagraj Meena
- Constituency: Dhariawad

Personal details
- Born: 20 July 1995 (age 30) Bhandla, Pratapgarh, Rajasthan
- Party: Bharat Adivasi Party

Thavar Chand Meena (born 20 July 1995) is an Indian politician who is the 16th Member of the Rajasthan Legislative Assembly. He represents Dhariawad. He is a member of the Bharat Adivasi Party.
