= Kariyawad =

Village in Rajasthan, India

Kariyawad is a village near Pratapgarh, Rajasthan in Pratapgarh district (Rajasthan) of Rajasthan state of India.
