= Peepal Khoont =

Peepal Khoont Pipalkhunt
- Tehsil Headquarter & District Subdivision
- Interactive map of Peepal Khoont
- Coordinates: 23.80°N 74.56°E
- Country: India
- State: Rajasthan
- District: Pratapgarh

Population (2011)
  - Total: 118,439

Languages
  - Official: Hindi
- Time zone: UTC+5:30 (IST)
- PIN: 312624 (New), 327023 (Old)
- Telephone code: 02961
- Vehicle registration: RJ-03/RJ-35
- Sex ratio: 957 ♂/♀

Peepal Khoont mainly known as Pipalkhunt is a village, Tehsil headquarter and Panchayat Samiti of the Pratapgarh district of Rajasthan state. It is a sub-division among the 5 sub-divisions of the Pratapgarh district. The main market is called Sadar Bajar. It is situated on National Highway 113. Pipalkhunt is a town located on the Banswara - Jaipur Expressway surrounded by the hills, plants and trees. The town is situated on the bank of the Mahi River.

== History ==
Pipalkhunt had been a sub tehsil of Ghatol tehsil of Banswara district before it was declared as a sub division of Pratapgarh, when the district came into existence. Pratapgarh district is the 33rd district of Rajasthan, created on 26 January 2008. It is a part of Udaipur Division. The distance from Pipalkhunt to Pratapgarh is 38 km (24 mi), and from Banswara is 46 km (29 mi).At first Kesrimal Dhirawat named person come & setup in village.

== Population ==
Inhabited by about 80% of tribal population of Meena community, Pipalkhunt has 31 Gram Panchayats, 3 Inspector revenue circles, 20 patwar circles and 207 inhabited villages.

As per 2011 census, the population of this sub division was around 5890 out of which the male population was around 2980 and females were around 2914. Scheduled caste population was around 3,424 and scheduled tribe population was around 66,355.

== Literacy and education ==
It has 52.44% male literacy, and 22.74% female literacy as per 2001 census.

== Geography ==
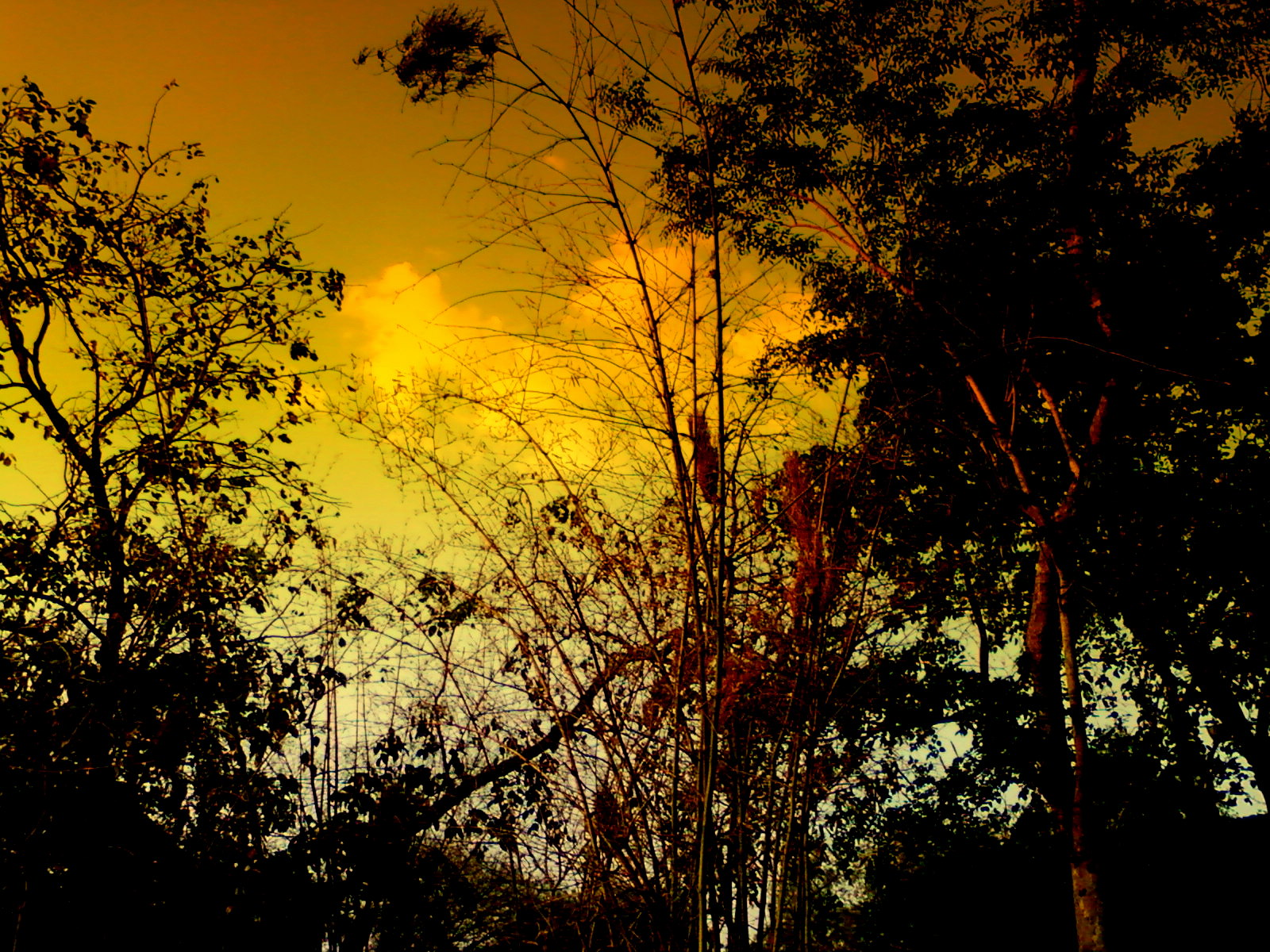
Peepal Khoont Forest

Part of this tehsil has dense forest wealth. Bori, Chhari, Dungawali, Jetaliya, Kelamata, Nayan, Kesharpura, Ghantali and Tamatiya are relatively bigger villages.

The town has a Govt. Hospital, Homeopathy Hospital, Panchayat Samiti, Police station, Tehsil Headquarter, Magistrate Office, Lower Justice Court and Many Administrative hubs for nearby villages.

Pipalkhunt is the center of many political affairs as the previous and current MLAs (Member of Vidhan Sabha) are from the nearby locations of Pipalkhunt.

== Main attractions ==
1. Amba Mata Mandir,
2. Pawti Hanuman Mandir
3. Mahi Mata Mandir
4. Sheetla Mata Mandir
5. Digamber Jain Mandir
6. Mahi River
7. Shiv Mandir
8. Kali Kalyan Dham
9. Gautameshwar Mahadev
10. Mahi Bajaj Sagar Dam
11. Rama Peer Ki Dargah
12. Jakham Dam
13. Mail Talab
14. Kela Mela

== Transport Connectivity ==
=== By Air ===
Nearest Airport is Maharana Pratap Airport or Udaipur Airport which is the domestic airport at Udaipur, Rajasthan, India. It is situated 22 km (14 mi) east of Udaipur city which is about 165 km (103 mi). far from Pipalkhunt. It has a temporary helipad in operation.

=== By Train ===
The nearest Railway stations to the Peepal Khoont are Mandsaur (69 km), Nimbahera (115 km), Dungarpur (119 km), Ratlam (100 km) and Udaipur (165 km).

Pratapgarh is the only district without rail-connectivity in Rajasthan state. However, as a result of untiring efforts by ex-district collector Hemant Shesh, the Government of Rajasthan agreed to pursue vigorously with Ministry of Railways, Government of India to connect Pratapgarh with broad-gauge from Mandsaur (32 km), for which appropriate financial contribution to GOI may also be made by the state, if required. It is therefore, presumed that a new railway track ultimately shall be laid from Mandsaur to Pratapgarh, as publicly assured and announced by Shri Ashok Gahlot, the chief minister of Rajasthan on 18 May 2011 at Pratapgarh. Shri Dinesh Trivedi, Minister of Railways, introducing the Railway Budget 2012–2013 on 14 March 2012 has declared to undertake a survey of laying railway track between Mandsaur and Pratapgarh. This new line includes in the GOI list of 111 New Line Surveys to be taken up during 2012–13.

The Railway Ministry has approved railway line to be established to connect the Dungarpur and Ratlam station. The total distance between Ratlam to Dungarpur is around 187.6 km (116.6 mi), Banswara is situated in the center of these two stations. Recently railway line work in progress and final location for rail track marked by agency.

=== By Road ===
Peepal Khoont is well connected with major cities in Rajasthan, Gujarat & Madhya Pradesh by road. Daily bus services connects Pipalkhunt with Delhi (714 km), Jaipur (458 km), Bhilwara (207 km), Mumbai (683 km), Chittorgarh (148 km), Ajmer (345 km), Alwar (604 km), Jodhpur (422 km), Bikaner (596 km), Pilani (661 km), Hanumangarh (774 km), Shriganganagar (840 km), Pali, Jalore (360 km), Jhalawar (291 km), Kota, Ahmedabad (295 km), Vadodara (274 km), Surat (420 km), Bhavnagar (467 km), Vapi (524 km), Ratlam (127 km), Neemuch (108 km), Dungarpur (119 km), Rajsamand (275 km), Bhopal (445 km), Indore (271 km), Mandsaur (69 km), Dahod (149 km), Godhra (197 km) and many other cities in Rajasthan. Private bus operators are also providing regular connectivity to Peepal Khoont from nearby places.

== Public Representatives ==
Lok Sabha

Banswara Dungarpur Lok Sabha constituency is one of the 25 Lok Sabha (parliamentary) constituencies in Rajasthan state in India.

Sh. Rajkumar Rout of BAP is the newly elected member of Lok Sabha from Banswara Dungarpur (Lok Sabha constituency)]] in the 2024 elections.

Vidha Sabha

In 2024 assembly elections in Rajasthan, Sh. Nanalal Ninama of INC won the Ghatol (St) assembly constituency.
