= Jagdish Lal Raj Soni =

Jagdish Lal Raj Soni is a well known craftsperson from Pratapgarh in Rajasthan state in India. He was awarded Shilp Guru Award in 2002 for Thewa art.

He undertook a course in Design from London University in 1968.

In 1970 he got a Merit Certificate for his work. In 1977 he received the National Award. He also received the Rajasthan Samman Award. He received Kala Mani Puraskar and Umed Bhawan Jubilee Award in Jodhpur, as well as the award from INTACH, Delhi.

Jagdish Lal has demonstrated his art in Asia Handicrafts Fair in Japan, Ritteberg Museum in Zurich and Ethnographic Museum in Geneva.
