= Girish Rajsoni =

Girish Rajsoni was the 2015 winner of the Shilp Guru award for thewa and gold filigree on glass. He is from Pratapgarh, Rajasthan, India.

The Government of India has issued a postal stamp featuring an awe-inspiring piece of thewa on a plate, made by Girish Rajsoni in 2002.

== Achievements ==
- UNESCO Seal of Excellence in 2005
- National Award in 1999 by Govt of India
- State Award in 1993–94 by Govt of Rajasthan
