= Beni Ram Soni =

Beni Ram Soni was the 2002 winner of the Shilp Guru award for thewa and gold filigree on glass. He is from Pratapgarh, Rajasthan, India.
