= Nagraj Meena =

Indian politician

Member of Rajasthan Legislative Assembly
- In office 2021–2023
- Preceded by: Gotam Lal
- Succeeded by: Thavar Chand
- Constituency: Dhariawad

Personal details
- Born: Dhariawad
- Spouse: Bhulaki Meena

Nagraj Meena is a former member of the Rajasthan Legislative Assembly from Dhariawad constituency.
