= Jakham River =

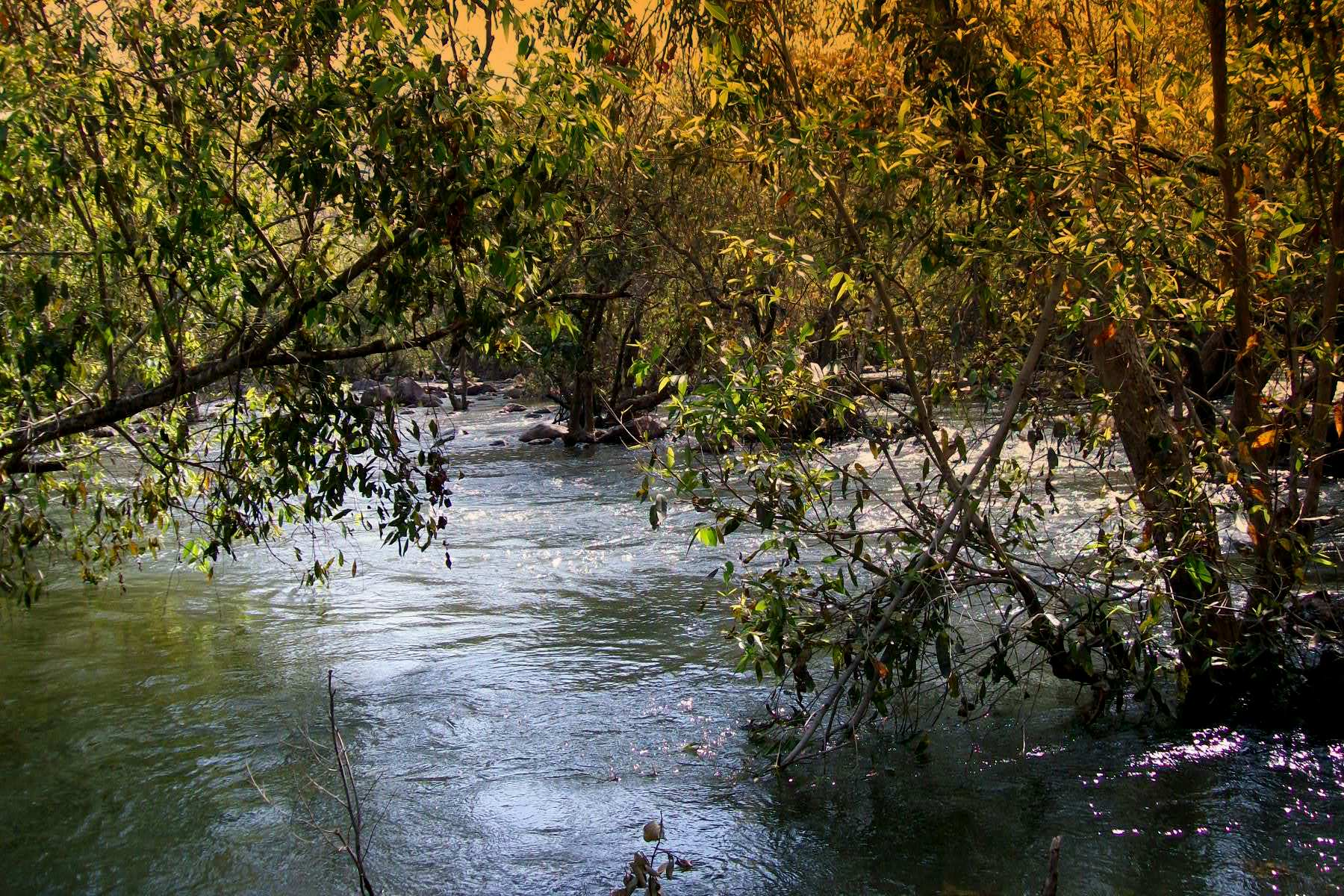
- Jakham River in Sitamata sanctuary in Pratapgarh

Location
- Country: India

Physical characteristics
- Source
  - location: Pratapgarh district, Rajasthan
  - coordinates: 23°54′29.16″N 74°13′14.16″E

Jākham River (also known as Jakam River, Jākam River) is a stream located in Pratapgarh district Rajasthan, India. It has an elevation of approximately 112 meters above sea level. It is a tributary of the Som River, flowing into the latter on the border between Udaipur and Dungarpur districts.
