= Thewa =

Jewelry art

Thewa is a special art of jewelry making which involves fusing of intricately worked-out sheet gold on molten glass. It evolved in Pratapgarh district, Rajasthan India. Its origin dates back to the rajput era.

== Process ==
The glass is treated by a special process to have glittering effects, which in turn highlights the intricate gold work. The whole Thewa piece is hand crafted over a period of one month by skilled artisans. Thewa, an art that pulsates with life, caught seemingly in movement, in motifs used on jewellery, which shows the culture, heritage and tales of romance and valour of Rajasthan with nature and happiness depicting the art of the fine craftsmanship. The process of making thewa work is detailed; time consuming and intricate, taking up to a month to complete each piece. It starts with broken pieces of terracotta, finely ground, mixed with chemicals and oil to produce a thick paste. The paste spread on a wooden base has a 23carat gold sheet of 40gauge thickness set onto the mixture and the free hand design etched on it. Black paint spread over the gold sheet that highlights the design so it becomes clearly visible for further detailed work with fine tools. The craftsman removes the excess gold creating a design often based on the Hindu mythology or Mughal court scenes, historical events or with flora and fauna motifs.

== Origin ==
Nathu ji Soni invented the process in 1767; the secrets of the craft that passed directly from father to son over the generations remains it in the family only, who call themselves 'Raj-Sonis’. Many of the members from this family have been awarded by UNESCO, National & State Government. Some of the finest examples of this unique form of decorative art are in local museum collections in India as well as abroad including the Metropolitan Museum of Art and the Victoria & Albert.

Other Origin: THEWA is a word from the local Rajasthani language which means “SETTING”. A 23ct gold piece is first beaten into a very thin sheet. Intricate designs are inscribed onto these gold sheets using very fine chisel. This gold sheet, called as “Thewa Ki Patti” is fixed to a lac-resin compound spread on a board by slightly warming the lac and then pressing the gold sheet onto it. An open work pattern is pierced thru these gold sheets placed on the lac-resin covered board by knocking off the portions which ultimately creates the intricate design. The gold sheet is gently peeled off by heating it.

The Pratapgarh district makes many different kinds of artisan items, including Thewa. Besides traditional items such as handicraft items, glass photo frames, trays, glass art ware, glass jewelry boxes, lamp shades, flower vases, crystal wine glasses, flasks, glass pots, antique crystal chandeliers, glass coasters, glass lamp shades and glass paintings, Pratapgarh makes Thewa with coloured glass bases that are embossed with golden miniature artwork. Floral patterns are etched on gold foil and superimposed on glass moulds and the glassware is cast in such moulds.

Ramprasad Rajsoni was the first awardee in the thewa-kala for his master-craftmanship in 1966. Like many others of the local craftsmen, Jagdish Lal Raj Soni, Beni Ram Soni, Girish Rajsoni and craftspersons from Pratapgarh in Rajasthan state in India were also awarded the Shilp Guru Award for Thewa art.

Recently one craftsman Mahesh Raj Soni of the traditional artisan family has won another national award and Padma Shree 2015 for his excellent Thewa handicraft and with this his family has been featured in the LIMCA yearbook 2011 as "Eight national awards in one family". Hitesh RajSoni (2004), Girish Rajsoni have been awarded by "UNESCO Seal of Excellence Award". They are among the youngest personalities in Rajsoni Family who got this Award. One such Young Artist Raghav rajsoni is the only one by whom Thewa kala got honoured in Taraz Kazaksthan as the first International award .
