= Sita Mata Wildlife Sanctuary =

Wildlife sanctuary in India

- IUCN category IV (habitat/species management area)
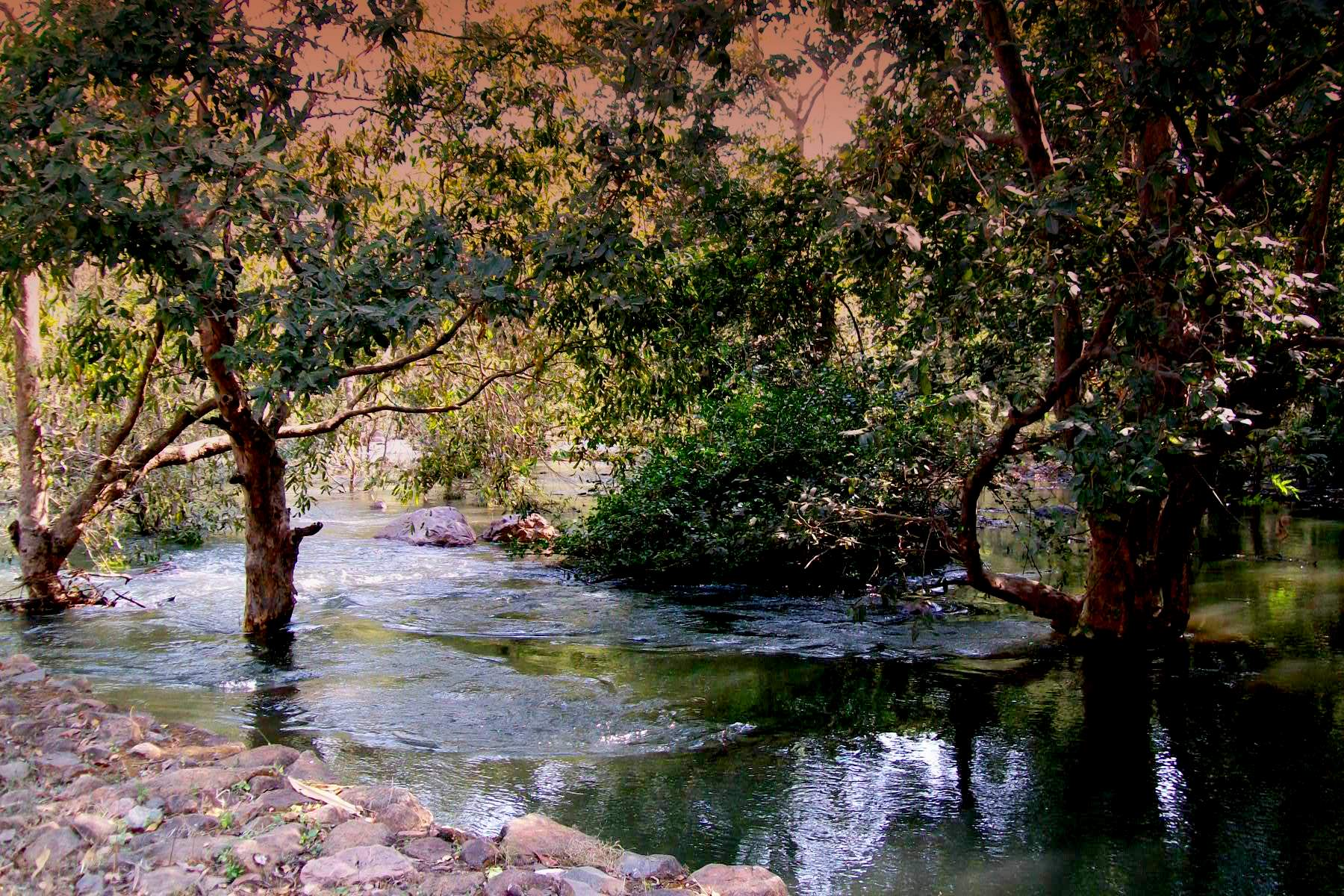
- A view of Sita Mata sanctuary

- Location within Rajasthan Location within India
- Interactive map of Sita Mata Wildlife Sanctuary
- Nearest city: Pratapgarh
- Coordinates: 24°13′26″N 74°30′26″E
- Area: 422.95 sq km
- Established: 1 November 1979

The Sita Mata Wildlife Sanctuary is a wildlife sanctuary situated in Pratapgarh and Chittaurgarh districts of Rajasthan Rajasthan, India, declared as a protected forest area by the Government of Rajasthan Notification No. F 11 (9) Revenue/8/79, dated 2/11/1979. It is a dense forest, with an area of 422.95 square kilometers, which is about 40% of the total land area of the district. The land is undulating because of the confluence of three different formations — Malwa Plateau, the Vindhyachal Hills and Aravali mountain ranges.

== Flora ==
It is the only forest region where more than half of the trees are high building value teak. These include salar, tendu (Diospyros melonoxy Roxb.), bad, peepal, babool, neem, arinja (Acacia leucophaea), siras, churail, kachnar, gulmohar, amaltas, bakayan, ashoka tree, mahua, semal, goondi, khejadi (Prosopis spicigera), kumta (Acacia rupestris), amla, bamboo, sindoor, chironjee, rudraksha and bel trees. A survey has been taken to document ethnobotanical information on plants used by the natives to construct their huts and hamlets. At least 31 different species are used to construct of various types of huts and hamlets in the sanctuary. Of the 108 varieties of high value medicinal herbs found here, 17 are endangered.

== Fauna ==
=== Birds ===
A large number of residential and migratory birds are found in this region, nearly 130 varieties. Little grebe, little cormorant, Indian darter (snake bird), gray heron, pond heron, cattle egret, little egret, painted stork, white-necked stork, spoonbill, lesser whistling thrush, ruddy shelduck, pintail, cotton teal, Indian spot-billed duck, nukta, parah kite, shikra, white-eyed buzzard, king vulture, white-backed vulture, tawny eagle, white scavenger vulture, eastrel, black partridge, rain quail, jungle bush quail, Indian peafowl, sarus crane, white-breasted waterhen, moorhen, purple moorhen, common coot, pheasant-tailed jacana, red-wattled lapwing, red shank, wood sandpiper, common sandpiper, little stint, black-winged stilt, stone-curlew, Indian courser, river tern, common sandgrouse, green pigeon, blue rock pigeon, red collared dove, Indian ring dove, spotted dove, little brown dove, Alexandrine parakeet, rose-ringed parakeet, blossom-headed parakeet, common hawk-cuckoo, pied crested cuckoo, koel, crow pheasant, spotted owlet, collared scops owl, Franklis nightjar, house swift, palm swift, pied kingfisher, common kingfisher, white breasted kingfisher, Asian green bee-eater, blue tailed eater, blue-cheeked bee-eater, Indian roller, European roller, hoopoe, gray hornbill, coppersmith, golden backed woodpecker, yellow fronted pied woodpecker, Indian pitta, red winged bush lark, ashy crowned finchlark, rufous tailed finchlark, crested lark, dusky crag martin, wire-tailed swallow, red-rumped swallow, gray shrike, bay-backed shrike, rufous backed shrike, golden oriole, black drongo (king crow), white-bellied drongo, brahminy myna, rody paster, common myna, bank myna, Indian tree pie, house crow, jungle crow, black-headed cuckooshrike, scarlet minivet, common iora, red-vented bulbul, common babbler, yellow-eyed babbler, large grey babbler, gray headed flycatcher, red-breasted flycatcher, white browed fantail flycatcher, paradise flycatcher, Franklin's ween warbler, tailorbird, lesser whitethroat, Indian robin, crested bunting, magpie robin, brown rock chat, collared bush chat, pied bush chat, large cuckooshrike, wood shrike, grey tit, yellow-cheeked tit, yellow headed wagtail, grey wagtail, white wagtail, purple sunbird, white-eye, house sparrow, weaver bird, red avadavat, white-throated munia, scaly-breasted munia, are a few varieties that are common to this forest region.

Two new bird species, white-throated ground thrush and black-necked monarch were discovered in the sanctuary.

=== Mammals ===
The flying squirrel (Petaurista philippensis) can be seen gliding from one tree to another around sunset in the Arampura forest, 17 km away from Dhariawad . Its feeding activities are nocturnal and therefore it hides during the day time in its hollow in a Mahua tree. The best time to watch flying squirrels is between February and March, when most of the Mahua trees shed their leaves and it is easier to spot the squirrel gliding between branches of leafless trees.

There are a variety of deer at the sanctuary, including the Chousingha (four-horned antelope) and spotted deer. Caracal, wild boar, pangolin, Indian leopard, striped hyena, golden jackal, Bengal fox, jungle cat, porcupine, sloth bear, and nilgai are also present.

=== Asiatic Lion Reintroduction Project ===
The Asiatic lion, which used to occur in Rajasthan, is now confined to Gujarat. Sita Mata Sanctuary had been considered as a place to relocate some lions, but the availability of prey was deemed to be negligible. Also, the area was prone to human disturbance.

== See also ==
- Arid Forest Research Institute (AFRI)
- Khathiar-Gir dry deciduous forests
