= Chhoti Sadri =

- Town
- Location in Rajasthan, India Chhoti Sadri (India)
- Coordinates: 24.38°N 74.70°E
- Country: India
- State: Rajasthan
- District: Pratapgarh
- Elevation: 485 m (1,591 ft)

Population (2011)
  - Total: 18,360

Languages
  - Official: Hindi
- Time zone: UTC+5:30 (IST)
- Telephone code: +91-1473

Chhoti Sadri is a town and a municipality in Pratapgarh district in the state of Rajasthan, India.

Chhoti sadri town is situated near Rajasthan and Madhya Pradesh border and well connected with Pratapgarh and Chittaurgarh by national highway 113. Nearest railway station is Nimach which is connected by state highway.

== Geography ==
Chhoti Sadri is located at 24.38°N 74.70°E. It has an average elevation of 485 m (1,591 ft).

== Demographics ==
As of 2011 India census, Chhoti Sadri had total population of 18,360, of which 9,326 are male and 9,034 female.
