= Arnod =

Coordinates: 23°53′08″N 74°48′55″E

A small, and ancient town in Pratapgarh district of Rajasthan state in India Arnod, (also written as Arnaud), a tehsil headquarters, is located in its south between 23.88' E and 74.81' N. The total land area of Arnod is 6,4577 hectares with 9491 hectares of reserve forest land. It has been an independent sub-tehsil headquarters since British days. The major population consists of tribal Meena community.

Arnod is about 18 km. situated on Pratapgarh-Piploda road (SH 81-B). Its revenue borders link with those of Neemach and Mandsaur districts of Madhya Pradesh.

== Origin of name ==
Its present name has been derived from two of its ancient names- Arunodaya and Aranyarodan. Legend has it that Arnod had very thick forests, so much so that no human being was inhabited in this region. Lord Krishna, in Dvapara Yuga got a portion of this huge forest trimmed for Pandawas for their brief, but eventful stay during secret-exile, thus this name. It was also called land of "Arunodaya"- a region, where the morning sun first of all disseminates its golden rays.

== History ==
The Sisodia clan Rajputs of Arnod were the direct descendants of 'Maharaj' Lal Singh, the younger son of Maharawat Salim Singh of Pratapgarh (1756–1774), who were allotted this Jagir of Arnod. (1774–1840). Lal Singh was born in 1767 AD, who built a small fortress in village Lalgarh. Arjun Singh, the son of Lal Singh, was enthroned on this Jagir in 1829. After his death, two successors took over- Kushal Singh, and then his son Raghunath Singh. Raghunath Singh, in 1860, was adopted by Udai Singh ( 1864–1890) . When Govardhan Singh, the younger son was born to Raghunath Singh, he declared him 'Maharaj of Arnod' on 4 September 1901. Maharaj Govardhan Singh was Last Emperor of Arnod Jagir declared by Government of Rajasthan State. His grandson Maharaj Lt Col Jairaj reside in Govardhan Niwas, Arnod. Due to its importance and strategic location, Arnod has been called Bada-Pargana. Three kilometers from Arnod is village Veerawali. It is recorded in the history that when the Sultan of Malwa attacked Arnod thikana, the young and brave soldiers from this village were in the frontline of battle.

== Geography ==
The land of Arnod is black fertile soil, created by volcano magma, where Maize, Soya bean, Wheat, Gram, Masoor and opium are chief crops.

== Administration ==
Arnod is a sub division of Pratapgarh district, where offices of SDO, Tehsildar, ACJM, BDO, CDPO etc. are in existence. It has 30 Patwar Mandals.

== Places of interest ==
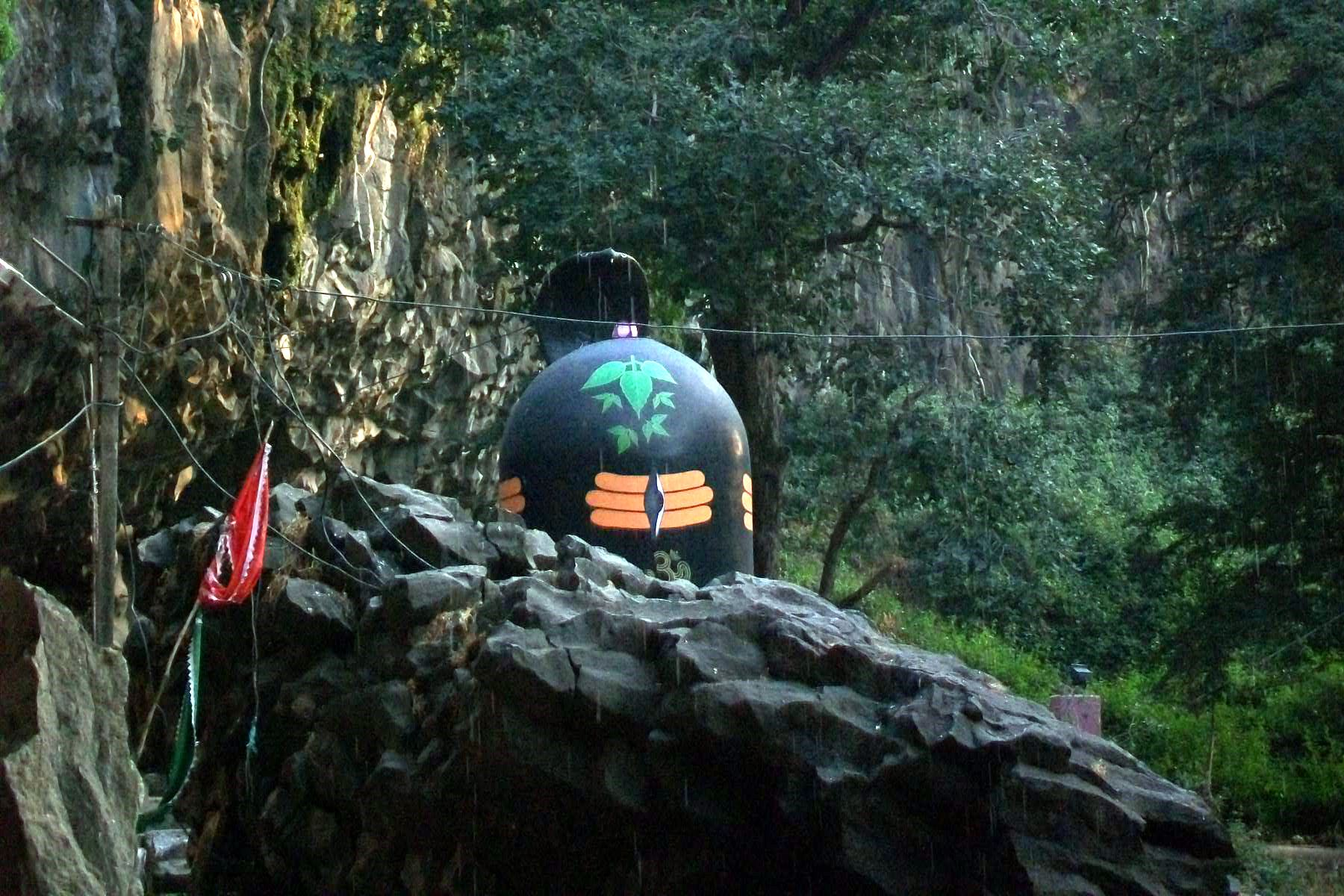
Gautameshwara

Arnod is a land of temples. Hanuman Temple, Mataji's temple, Goreshwar-Mahadev, and Ramkund temples are major centres of Hindu faith. Out of the most celebrated ones is "Gautameshwara" tribal pilgrimage, (2.5 km from Arnod) where an annual fair is held on Vaishakh Poornima attracting pilgrims from far and wide. With the assistance of Tourism department, the present district administration is going to develop this spot as an ideal tourism destination.
