= Dhariawad =

Dhariawad daria-abad Dhariyawad
- Town
- Location in Rajasthan, India Dhariawad (India)
- Coordinates: 24.1°N 74.45°E
- Country: India
- State: Rajasthan
- District: Pratapgarh district
- Tehsil: Dhariawad Tehsil

Population (2011)
  - Total: 11,368

Languages
  - Official: Hindi
- Time zone: UTC+5:30 (IST)
- Postal code: 313605
- ISO 3166 code: RJ-IN
- Vehicle registration: RJ-
- Dhariawad was an integral part of Udaipur district until Pratapgarh was declared as District in early 1st decade of 21st century.

Dhariawad is a census town in Pratapgarh district in the state of Rajasthan, India. It is the administrative headquarters for Dhariawad Tehsil.

== Demographics ==
As of the 2001 Indian census, the town of Dhariawad had a population of 14,646, by the 2011 census it had grown to 11,368. In 2001 males constituted 51% of the population and females 49%, by 2011 that had changed to 50.6% males, and 49.4% females. Dhariawad had an average literacy rate of 68%, with male literacy at 76% and female literacy at 59% in 2001; however, by 2011 the average literacy rate had risen to 83.12%, with male literacy at 90.71% and female literacy at 75.48%. In Dhariawad in 2001, 15% of the population was under six years of age, but by 2011 this had dropped to 12.44%. The sex ratio for children in Dhariawd in 2011 was 0.875 females per 1 male, a likely indicator of female infanticide.

Jains contribute 21.48% population in this town as of 2011, which is rare in India.

== Geography ==
Dhariawad is the river city of Pratapgarh District. It has more than five rivers. The main river is the Jiggi, others include the Jakham, Karmoi (Sitamata), Sukali, and Bhervi. In ancient times Dhariawad was known as dariya (rivers) wad (in between).

== Places of interest ==
The city has a green forest, with wild animals in Sitamata sanctuary and the lush green hills. Jakham dam, the biggest dam of Rajasthan, is 32 km away from here. During the monsoon season, the beauty of this area is beyond description. There are many other famous temples and places of tourist interest. Many a times, this town has lost its road connections to the rest of world because of heavy rains. It has another important aspect from the Archaeological point of view. Mahoo area (2 km from town) is the center of ancient historical evidences including beautiful Hindu and Jain temples. The region is rich in mineral wealth as well. India's 60% soapstone is found in Rajasthan and Rajasthan's 80% soapstone mines are in Dhariawad region.

Transportation

Dhariawad has good connectivity by road. There are many RSRTC buses are available for nearly cities like Udaipur, Banswara, Chittorgarh, Pratapgarh, Dungarpur, Mandsaur, Ratlam, Neemuch, Indore, etc.

Dhariawad has no railway station. The nearest railway stations are Mandsaur (55 km), Mavli Jn.(89 km) and Udaipur (130 km). The nearest airport is Udaipur airport, Which is 125 km From Dhariawad.
