= Pratapgarh district, Rajasthan =

Pratapgarh district
- District of Rajasthan
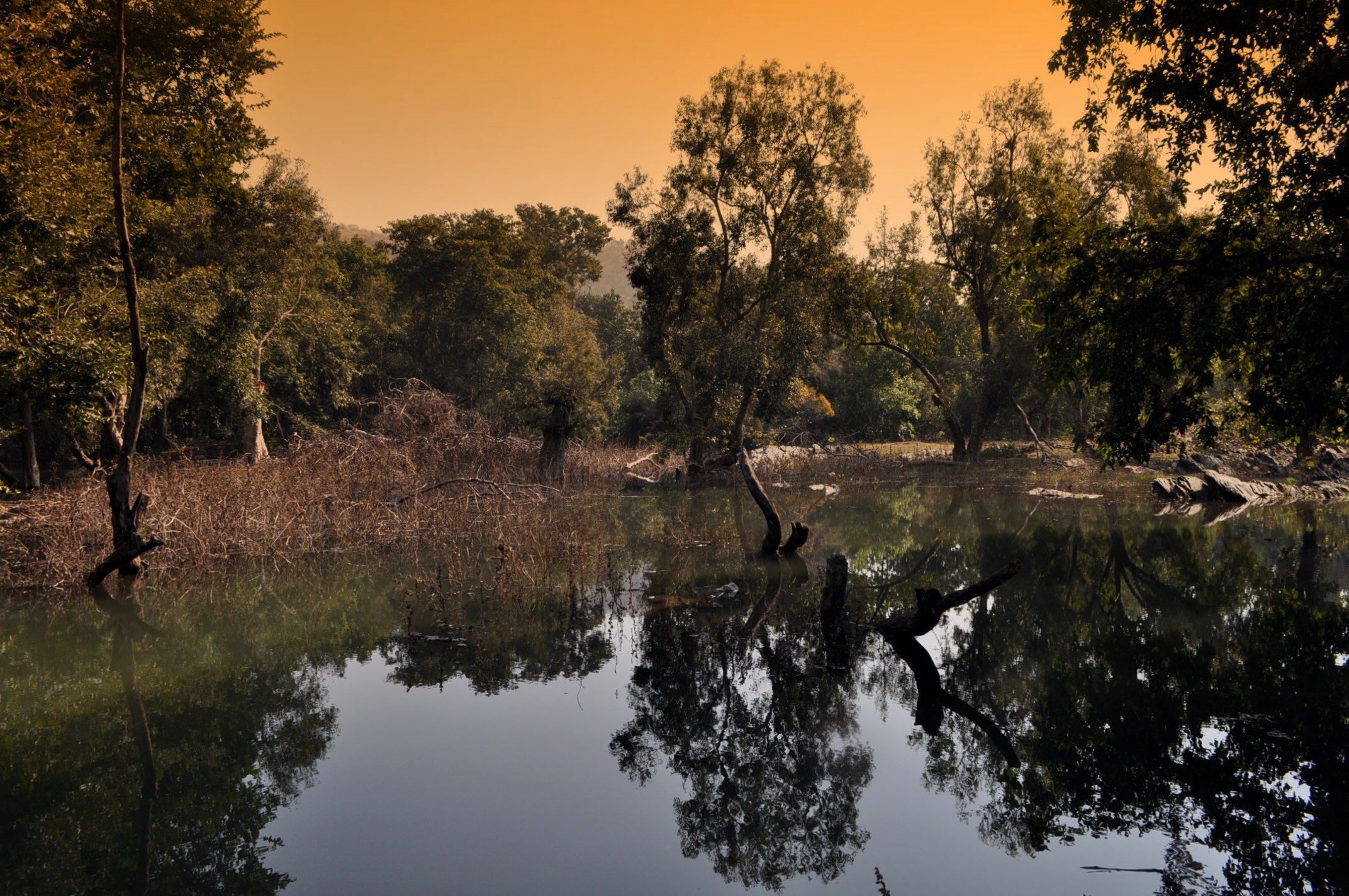
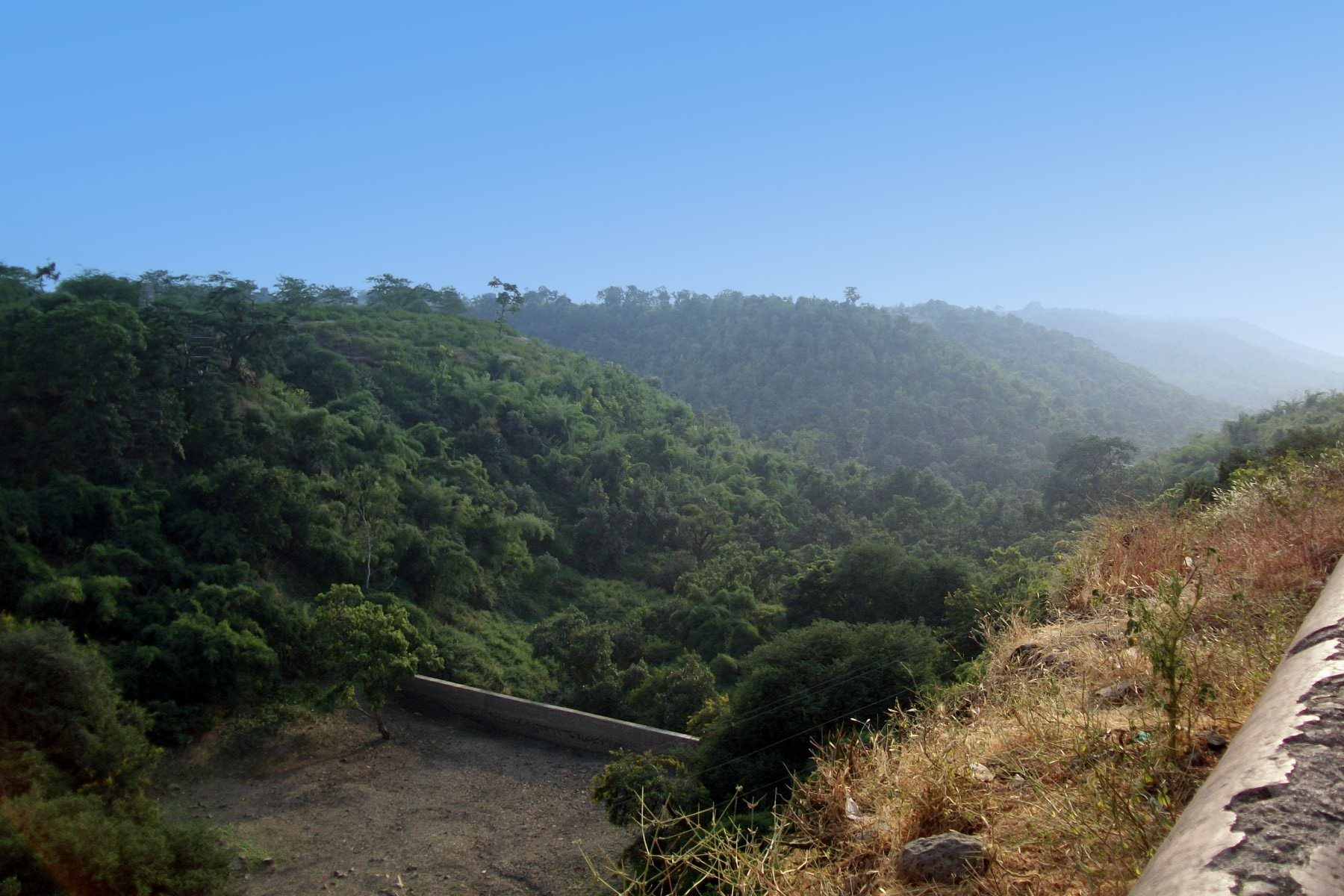
- Top: Jakham River in Sita Mata Wildlife Sanctuary; Bottom: Landscape near Arnod

- Location of Pratapgarh district in Rajasthan
- Coordinates (Pratapgarh, Rajasthan): 24°01′48″N 74°46′48″E
- Country: India
- State: Rajasthan
- Division: Banswara
- Headquarters: Pratapgarh

Government
  - District Collector & Magistrate: Dr. Anjali Rajoria, IAS
  - Superintendent of Police: Laxman Das, IPS

Area
  - Total: 4,117.36 km^{2} (1,589.72 sq mi)

Population (2011)
  - Total: 867,848
  - Density: 210.778/km^{2} (545.912/sq mi)
  - Urban: 71,728

Demographics
  - Literacy: 47.12 (in 2011)
- Time zone: UTC+05:30 (IST)
- Major highways: NH 113
- Website: Pratapgarh District

Pratapgarh district is the 33rd district of Rajasthan, created on 26 January 2008. It is a part of Udaipur Division and has been carved out from the erstwhile tehsils of Chittorgarh, Udaipur and Banswara districts. Pratapgarh town (Pin Code 312605, STD Code 01478) is the administrative headquarters of the district.

== History ==
The rulers of 'Partabgadh-Raj' were descendants of Sisodia clan of Mewar Rajputs.

Vasundhara Raje, the then Chief Minister of Rajasthan, announced Pratapgarh to be an independent district in 2008.

District Map of Pratapgarh, Rajasthan, India

Well known for pure gold and glass-inlay handmade unique jewellery called "Thewa", Pratapgarh, as the 33rd district of Rajasthan, came into existence on 26 January 2008, comprising five Tehsils/ sub-divisions, Pratapgarh, Chhotee Sadri, Dhariyawad, Arnod and Peepal Khoont.

The district is dotted with good number of ancient and historical sites, but in want of a detailed study either by the Archaeological Survey of India or by the Department of Archaeology and Museums, Government of Rajasthan, there are no 'protected monuments' as such. A few important still unexplored archaeological and historical sites include Avleshwara, Ghotaavarshika (Ghotarsi), Sidheriya, Gandharvpur (Gandher) Jaanagarh, Veerpur and many others. Sita Mata sanctuary houses pre-historic rock engravings.

Ghotarasi village is located around 10 km from the town, which has an Old Suryanarayan temple, Gotameswara is an ancient lord Shiva temple situated 18 km from Pratapgarh near Arnod town. It is believed that this temple has a secret tunnel made by Pandvas during their 'agyatwaas' period, which connects this place to Ujjain city.

=== Creation ===
People of Pratapgarh were demanding to make it an independent district separate from Chittorgarh district, of which it was a part. The Government of Rajasthan declared on 6 July 2006 its intention to create Pratapgarh as a separate district. The process of officially declaring Pratapgarh as a new district took some time. Chief Minister Vasundhara Raje declared Praratapgarh as 33rd district of Rajasthan on 8 March 2007 in legislative assembly's budget session. Pratapgarh, Arnod and Chhoti Sadri tehsils from Chittorgarh district, Peepal Khoont from Banswada district and Dhariyawad from Udaipur district were unified together to form this new district.

Princely flag of the state of 'Partabgarh'

== Geography ==
Location

Pratapgarh is located at 24.03° N 74.78° E with an average elevation of 580 meters (1610 feet above mean sea level). It is said to be the second highest place (?) in Rajasthan after Mount Abu. Situated on the junction of the Aravali mountain ranges and the Malwa Plateau its unique location prominently carries the geological characteristics of these both.

Area

The geographical area of Pratapgarh is 4,11,736 hectares, out of which forest area is 1,20,976 hectares (2009-'10).

Climate, Soil, Topography and Minerals

The average annual rainfall is 856 mm. The soil is mainly highly fertile Black Cotton Soil made of magma of volcanos. The major rivers of the district are Jakham, Mahi, and Siwana or shiv. Other seasonal rivers are Som, Era, and Karmoi. Out of five, four sub divisions except Chhoti Sadri, are notified forest blocks, where no major industry or mining activity is allowed under law. However, in non-forest regions of Chhoti Sadri (and part of Pratapgarh and Dhariyawad), small scale mining activities are in operation extracting mainly red ochre, calcite, dolomite, quartz, feldspar and soapstone. Marble, Building-stone and Limestone are also available in small quantities.

== Divisions ==
Pratapgarh district comprises 5 sub-divisions, Arnod, Chhoti Sadri, Dhariawad, Peepal Khoont and Pratapgarh.

The number of revenue villages in Arnod Tehsil is 178, in Choti Saari Tehsil the number is 141, Dariyawad Tehsil is 249 whereas Peepal khoont Tehsil has 23 and in Pratapgarh Tehsil there are 330 revenue villages.

The major villages of Pratapgarh district include Dhamottar, Kulmipura, Sidhhpura, Rathanjana, Dhaula Pani, Devgarh, Salamgarh, Parsola, Ghantali, Arnod, Gandher, Asawsata, Kulthana, Avleshwar, Rajora, Kuni, Hathuniya, Pratappura, Mokhampura, Barotha, Basera, Basad, Varmandal, Bajranggarh, Suhagpura, Rampuriya, Chiklad, Gyaspur, Barawarda, Bardia, Thada, Panmodi, Jhansadi, Gautmeshwara, Dalot, Ghantali, Peepalkhoont, Rajpuriya, Bambori and Bagwas & Kherot, Badhi Shakthali.

== District administration ==
Collectorate, Pratapgarh

The district is overseen by a District Collector.

=== Police infrastructure ===
Pratapgarh has 13 police stations at Pratapgarh (city), Chhotee Sadri, Dhariyawad, Arnod, Peepalkhoont, Dhaula Pani, Dhamottar, Rathanjana, Salamgarh, Suhagpura, Devgarh, Hathuniya, Ghantali and 16 Police-chowkis are under them. One District Jail is located in Pratapgarh and a sub-jail in Chhoti Sadri, where under trial prisoners are housed.

=== Judiciary ===
A district and sessions' court was established in Pratapgarh in 1944, followed by one CJM court, one ACJM court the court of Additional Chief Judicial Magistrate, (in Chhoti Sadri) in 1980, Junior Judicial Magistrate's court in 1983, Additional Judicial Magistrate's court in 1989, Scheduled Castes-Scheduled Tribes Special Trial Court in 1992, Special court for Narcotics Cases in 1994, a District Consumers' Court, two ACJM courts (in Arnod and Dhariyawad) in 2008, a "Rural Court" in 2010. and recently one MACT court and one family court in 2017, Thirteen revenue courts- those of the Revenue Appeallate Authority (1), Collector & DM (1), Additional Collector & ADM (1), SDMs(5) Tehsidars (5) are also working in the district.

== Demographics ==
Historical population
Year	Pop.	±% p.a.
1901	93,238	—
1911	114,348	+2.06%
1921	122,648	+0.70%
1931	140,704	+1.38%
1941	166,527	+1.70%
1951	190,269	+1.34%
1961	243,761	+2.51%
1971	323,990	+2.89%
1981	441,507	+3.14%
1991	553,865	+2.29%
2001	706,807	+2.47%
2011	867,848	+2.07%

Religions in Pratapgarh district (2011)
Religion	Percent
Hinduism	95.33%
Islam	2.95%
Jainism	1.62%
Other or not stated	0.10%

The population of Pratapgarh in 1881 AD was 79,568; whereas it was 1,10,530 in 1951. According to the 2011 census Pratapgarh district (Rajasthan) has a population of 867,848, roughly equal to the nation of Qatar or the US state of Delaware. This gives it a ranking of 472nd in India (out of a total of 640). The district has a population density of 211 inhabitants per square kilometre (550/sq mi). Its population growth rate over the decade 2001-2011 was 22.84%. Pratapgarh has a sex ratio of 982 females for every 1000 males, and a literacy rate of 56.3%. 8.27% of the population lives in urban areas. Scheduled Castes and Scheduled Tribes make up 6.96% and 63.42% of the population respectively.

In 2011, Pratapgarh had population of 867,848 of which male and female were 437,744 and 430,104 respectively. In 2001 census, Pratapgarh had a population of 706,807 of which males were 359,021 and remaining 347,786 were females. Pratapgarh District population constituted 1.27 percent of total Rajasthan population. In 2001 census, this figure for Pratapgarh District was at 1.25 percent of Rajasthan population. There was change of 22.78 percent in the population compared to population as per 2001. In the previous census of India 2001, Pratapgarh District recorded increase of 27.09 percent to its population compared to 1991.

The initial provisional data released by census India 2011, shows that density of Pratapgarh district for 2011 is 195 people per km^{2}. In 2001, Pratapgarh district density was at 172 people per km^{2}. Pratapgarh district administers 4,449 square kilometers of areas.

With regards to Sex Ratio in Pratapgarh, it stood at 983 per 1000 male compared to 2001 census figure of 969. The average national sex ratio in India is 940 as per latest reports of Census 2011 Directorate. In 2011 census, child sex ratio is 933 girls per 1000 boys compared to figure of 953 girls per 1000 boys of 2001 census data.

There were total 150,518 children under age of 0–6 against 142,692 of 2001 census. Of total 150,518 male and female were 77,856 and 72,662 respectively. Child Sex Ratio as per census 2011 was 933 compared to 953 of census 2001. In 2011, Children under 0-6 formed 17.34 percent of Pratapgarh District compared to 20.19 percent of 2001. There was net change of -2.85 percent in this compared to previous census of India.

=== Languages ===
Languages in Pratapgarh district (2011)
1. Mewari (26.1%)
2. Rajasthani (17.2%)
3. Wagdi (Bhili) (26.9%)
4. Malvi (20.7%)
5. Hindi (7.98%)
6. Others (1.06%)

At the time of the 2011 census, 26.10% of the population spoke Mewari, 17.25% Rajasthani, 26.90% Wagdi, 20.71% Malvi and 7.98% Hindi as their first language.

== Economy ==
Major crops of this region are wheat, barley, maize, groundnuts, soya beans, gram, mustard, and some pulses.

Opium is also a major crop of Pratapgarh. There are 6,781 license holder-farmers in the district cultivating opium. The production of opium in 2011 in Pratapgarh district was 15,85,373.410 kg precisely as per statistics of District Opium Officer, Pratapgarh, Narcotics Bureau, Government of India.

=== Irrigation ===
The major Irrigation project of the district is the Jakham Dam, located in Anooppura village of Pratapgarh Tehsil, 32 km from Dhariawad and 35 km from district headquarters. This dam was built on the Jakham river, which originates from a small village Jakhamia in chhoti sadree subdivision. The Jakham dam's foundation was laid on 14 May 1968 by chief minister Mohan Lal Sukhadia, however, the actual construction-work of the dam started in 1969–70. The dam itself was completed in 1986, but took another twelve years for the completion of this irrigation project in March 2000. Initially the catchment of the Jakham Dam was 5,015 MCft for irrigating 52,354 hectares of land. Out of its total water retention capacity of 5,015 MC ft, the usable water capacity is 4,671 MC ft. The cost of this project is 106.03 crore. The length of this Dam is 253 meters, out of which spillway is in 90 m in length. The area around the dam is hilly and rugged but interesting. 13 km from the main dam, Nangaliya pick up ware has been constructed with Left main canal (39.90 km) and right main canal(34.12 km). Irrigation facility is being provided in 118 villages in Dhariawad sub-division.

=== Agriculture ===
Pratapgarh is one of the greenest districts of Rajasthan. Major crops, as indicated above, are wheat, maize, soya bean and opium. Agriculture is practiced both in the valleys and on the tableland on the hilltops. Common lands account for 40% of the total geographical area, nearly 30% of the common lands fall in the forest land category. The area is a Schedule V area, predominantly inhabited by the tribal communities.

Average landholdings are small and canal irrigation facilities are limited only to Dahriyawad and Peepal Khoont tehsils, therefore agriculture is mostly rain-fed. Besides farming, the tribal communities depend upon the forests for their food, fodder and fuel (wood requirements). Many of the members of tribal communities do migrate to nearby towns in Gujarat and Madhya Pradesh to find a job as farm-labourers or construction workers.

The production of wheat in 2009–10 was 1,90,585 MT in the district, of Maize it was 1,28,984 MT followed by Soya bean as 1,69,133, Mustered as 8,296 MT. Small quantity of Rice-production (989 MT) was also recorded.

== Public representatives ==
In 2009 the number of members of the Lok Sabha (the Parliament of India) was three. Dr. Ms. Girija Vyas represented Pratapgarh in the 15th Lok Sabha. In 2014 general elections to the Lok Sabha, Chandra Prakash Joshi is the current MP of the Chittorgarh Constituency replacing Ms. Girija Vyas.

In the 13th Assembly Members of the Legislative Assembly were Nand Lal Meena (Bhartiya Janata Party) (Pratapgarh), Udailal Anjna (Chittaurgarh-Chhoti Sadree-Indian National Congress-) Nanalal Ninama (Banswada-Peepal Khoont-Indian National Congress), ), Nagraj Meena Dhariawad (ST)(Indian National Congress), Prakash Chaudhry (Badi Sadri-Pratapgarh-(Indian National Congress)). Out of these five MLAs directly elected from the district are from Dhariyawad and Pratapgarh constituencies.

In 2013 general elections to the Assembly were held electing the following MLAs-

Pratapgarh- Nandlal Meema, BJP Dhariawad- Gautam Lal Meena, BJP

The elected Zila Parishad (2010) headed by Badri Lal Patidar consists of 17 members, whereas the Pratapgarh Municipality (Chairman-Kamlesh Doshi) has 25 and Chhoti Sadri (Chairman-Shyam sundar Agarwal) has 20 elected members (2010).

There are 152 gram panchayats in Pratapgarh with 1630 elected members in all. Pratapgarh Block has 42 gram panchayats, with 21 members in Panchayat Samiti, 28 gram panchayats in Arnod Block with 15 members in Panchayat Samiti, 24 gram panchayats in Chhoti Sadri with 15 Panchayat Samiti members, 31 gram panchayats in Dhariyawad Block with 17 members in Panchayat Samiti; and 27 gram panchayats in Peepalkhoont Block with 15 members of the Panchayat Samiti.

New elections for class 'A' Krishi Upaj Mandi of Pratapgarh have taken place (August 2011).

== Transport ==
Pratapgarh is well connected with major cities in Rajasthan, Gujarat & Madhya Pradesh by road. Daily Bus Services connect Pratapgarh with Chittaurgarh (110 km), Banswara (80 km), Udaipur (165 km), Dungarpur (95 km), Rajsamand (200 km), Jodhpur (435 km), Jaipur (421 km) Neemach (62 km), Ratlam (85 km), Mandsaur (32 km) and Delhi (705 km) and many other cities in Rajasthan. Private Bus operators are also providing regular connectivity to Pratapgarh from nearby places.

The total length of roads in the district is 1879 km, with more than 7,500 registered light and heavy vehicles.

It is the only district without rail-connectivity in Rajasthan state. However, as a result of untiring efforts by ex-district collector Hemant Shesh, the Government of Rajasthan agreed to pursue vigorously with Ministry of Railways, Government of India to connect Pratapgarh with broad-gauge from Mandsaur (32 km), for which appropriate financial contribution to GOI may also be made by the state, if required. It is therefore, presumed that a new railway track ultimately shall be laid from Mandsaur to Pratapgarh, as publicly assured and announced by Shri Ashok Gahlot, the chief minister of Rajasthan on 18 May 2011 at Pratapgarh. Shri Dinesh Trivedi, Minister of Railways, introducing the Railway Budget 2012–2013 on 14 March 2012 has declared to undertake a survey of laying railway track between Mandsaur and Pratapgarh. This new line includes in the GOI list of 111 New Line Surveys to be taken up during 2012–13.

An airstrip was approved by the Government of Rajasthan in April 2011 and being constructed in Varmandal village (13 km from Pratapgarh). Temporary helipads are in operation at four places in Pratapgarh, Dhariyawad, Peepalkhoont and Chhoti Sadri.

== Flora and fauna ==
- Sita Mata Wildlife Sanctuary

Sita Mata Wildlife Sanctuary : Photo: Hemant Shesh

== Academic sources ==
- John Mc Meekin, Arms & Flags of the Indian Princely States, 1990.
- The court Fee and Revenue Stamps of the Princely States of India, Adolph Koeppel & Raymon D. Manners, New York 1983.
- 'Zila Pratapgarh Nirdeshika', Edited and Published by District Administration, Pratapgarh, 2008
