= Pratapgarh, Rajasthan =

Pratapgarh
- Town
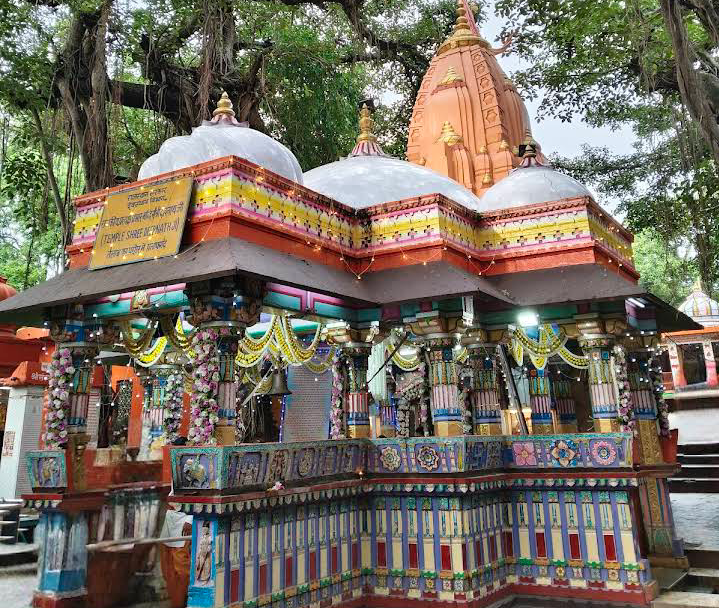
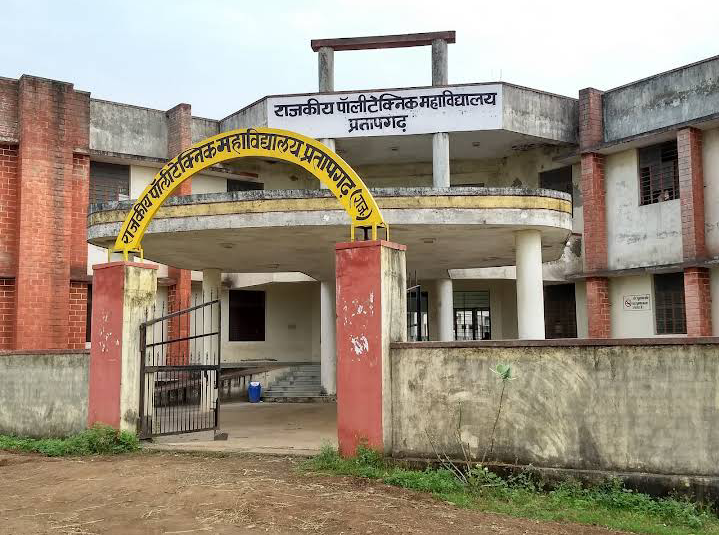

- Location in Rajasthan, India Pratapgarh (India)
- Coordinates: 24.03°N 74.78°E
- Country: India
- State: Rajasthan
- District: Pratapgarh

Government
  - Type: Municipality
  - Body: Pratapgarh Nagar Parishad
- Elevation: 491 m (1,611 ft)

Population (2011)
  - Total: 42,079

Languages
  - Official: Hindi
- Time zone: UTC+5:30 (IST)
- PIN: 312605
- Telephone code: 01478
- ISO 3166 code: RJ-IN
- Vehicle registration: RJ-35
- Website: Pratapgarh

Pratapgarh, is a town in Rajasthan, India. It is the district headquarters of Pratapgarh district of Rajasthan. Famous for its Thewa art, the city is surrounded by tribal villages. It is also famous for its edible Jeeravan and hing.

== History ==
Maharana Kumbha ruled Chittorgarh in the 14th century. Due to a dispute with his younger brother Kshemkarn he expelled him from his territory. Kshemkarn's family was a refugee for some time and lived in the Aravali near the south of Rajasthan. In 1514, his son Rajkumar Surajmal became the ruler of Devgarh, and this Raj later came to be known as Pratapgarh Raj. As the environment of Devgarh was not found to be suitable for the royal family, one of the descendants of Raja Surajmal, Rajkumar Pratapsingh built a new town near Devgarh in 1698 and named it Pratapgarh.

== Geography ==
Pratapgarh District is a district in Rajasthan state. it came into existence on 26 January 2008, as the 33rd district of Rajasthan. Pratapgarh is located at 24.03° N 74.78° E. It has an average elevation of 491 metres (1,610 ft). It is said to be the second highest place in Rajasthan after Mount Abu.

=== Topography ===
The inner part of the city has many narrow streets and some of them are so narrow that it is hard for two bikes to cross each other. In the last decade, the outer part of the city has developed rapidly. The topography of the area is undulating because of the confluence of three different geological formations; Malwa Plateau, Vindhyachal Hills and the Aravali range.

Nearby cities include Chhoti Sadri 47 km, Mandsaur 32 km and Arnod 17 km.

== Demographics ==
As of 2011 Indian Census, Pratapgarh had a total population of 42,079, of which 21,499 were males and 20,580 were females. Population in the age group of 0 to 6 years was 5,154. The total number of literates in Pratapgarh was 31,687, which constituted 75.3% of the population with male literacy of 80.5% and female literacy of 69.9%. The effective literacy rate of 7+ population of Pratapgarh was 85.8%, of which male literacy rate was 92.2% and female literacy rate was 79.2%. The Scheduled Castes and Scheduled Tribes population was 5,344 and 3,459 respectively. Pratapgarh had 8749 households as of 2011.

== Villages ==
- Kariyawad
